= Greatest Hits (Herb Alpert and the Tijuana Brass album) =

Album

Compilation album by Herb Alpert and the Tijuana Brass
- Released: 1970
- Genre: Jazz, Easy Listening
- Length: 42:28
- Label: A&M
- Producer: Herb Alpert, Jerry Moss

Herb Alpert and the Tijuana Brass chronology
The Brass Are Comin' (1969)	Greatest Hits (1970)	Summertime (1971)

Greatest Hits is a 1970 album by Herb Alpert & the Tijuana Brass. It was the group's first compilation album, with all selections coming from its first five albums. The album was released a few months after Alpert had disbanded the group. It rose to No. 43 on the U.S. charts, and to No. 8 in the U.K. The album was eventually certified gold in the spring of 1971.

== Background ==
Greatest Hits was released during Alpert's four-year sabbatical from performing, when he concentrated instead on producing records for other artists signed to his A&M label.

== Track listing ==
No.	Title	Writer(s)	Album	Length
1.	"Lonely Bull"	Sol Lake	The Lonely Bull	2:29
2.	"Spanish Flea"	Julius Wechter	Going Places	2:07
3.	"Getting Sentimental Over You"	George Bassman	Going Places	1:59
4.	"Love Potion #9"	Jerry Leiber, Mike Stoller	Whipped Cream & Other Delights	3:02
5.	"Never on Sunday"	Manos Hatzidakis, Bill Towne	The Lonely Bull	2:38
6.	"Mexican Shuffle"	Sol Lake	South of the Border	2:09
7.	"Taste of Honey"	Bobby Scott, Ric Marlow	Whipped Cream & Other Delights	2:43
8.	"Tijuana Taxi"	Ervan Coleman	Going Places	2:05
9.	"South of the Border"	Jimmy Kennedy, Michael Carr	South of the Border	2:06
10.	"America"	Leonard Bernstein, Stephen Sondheim	Volume 2	2:45
11.	"Whipped Cream"	Naomi Neville	Whipped Cream & Other Delights	2:33
12.	"Zorba the Greek"	Mikis Theodorakis	Going Places	4:25

== Charts ==
Chart (1970)	Peak position
US Billboard Top LPs	43
UK Top Albums	8
