= Classics Volume 1 =

Compilation album by Herb Alpert & the Tijuana Brass
- Released: 1986
- Genres: Jazz, Latin
- Label: A&M
- Producers: Herb Alpert, Jerry Moss

Herb Alpert & the Tijuana Brass chronology
Wild Romance (1985)	Classics Volume 1 (1986)	Classics Volume 20 (1987)

Classics Volume 1 is a compilation album by Herb Alpert & the Tijuana Brass. Although its actual release date was 1986, Classics Volume 1 was the first release of A&M Records' 25th Anniversary Series in 1987. The commemorative series was solely available on digital audio compact disc. Each volume contained the prominent works of a selected A&M artist. Volume 1 was the hits of Herb Alpert & the Tijuana Brass. Tracks ranged from their first single, "The Lonely Bull" in 1962, to "Jerusalem" in 1971. All tracks were originally produced by Herb Alpert and Jerry Moss.

Professional ratings
Review scores
Source	Rating
AllMusic	4.5/5 stars

== Track listing ==
1. "The Lonely Bull" (Sol Lake) – 2:15
2. "Acapulco 1922" (Herb Alpert) – 2:40
3. "A Taste of Honey" (Bobby Scott, Ric Marlow) – 2:44
4. "Green Peppers" (Sol Lake) – 1:31
5. "The Work Song" (Nat Adderley, Oscar Brown, Jr.) – 2:07
6. "I'm Getting Sentimental Over You" (George Bassman) – 2:11
7. "Whipped Cream" (Naomi Neville) – 2:33
8. "Lollipops and Roses" (Tony Velona) – 2:28
9. "What Now My Love" (Gilbert Bécaud, Carl Sigman) – 2:16
10. "Memories of Madrid" (Sol Lake) – 2:38
11. "This Guy's in Love With You" (Burt Bacharach, Hal David, arranged by Bacharach) – 3:58
12. "The Maltese Melody" (Bert Kaempfert, Herbert Rehbein) – 2:15
13. "So What's New?" (John Pisano) – 2:09
14. "Spanish Flea" (Julius Wechter) – 2:07
15. "Tijuana Taxi" (Ervan Coleman) – 2:06
16. "More And More Amor" (Sol Lake) – 2:43
17. "Jerusalem" (Herb Alpert) – 2:33
18. "Zorba The Greek" (Mikis Theodorakis) – 4:25
19. "Tangerine" (Johnny Mercer, Victor Schertzinger) – 2:45
20. "The Mexican Shuffle" (Sol Lake) – 2:12
21. "Marching Thru Madrid" (Sol Lake) – 2:31
22. "Mame" (Jerry Herman) – 2:07
23. "A Banda" (Chico Buarque de Hollanda) – 2:11
24. "Casino Royale" (Hal David, Burt Bacharach) – 2:36
25. "Love Potion # 9" (Jerry Leiber, Mike Stoller) – 2:57
