= Herb Alpert's Ninth =

1967 studio album by Herb Alpert and the Tijuana Brass

Studio album by Herb Alpert and the Tijuana Brass
- Released: December 8, 1967
- Recorded: Gold Star (Hollywood, California)
- Genre: Jazz pop, easy listening
- Length: 28:19
- Label: A&M
- Producer: Herb Alpert, Jerry Moss

Herb Alpert and the Tijuana Brass chronology
| Sounds Like... (1967) | Herb Alpert's Ninth (1967) | The Beat of the Brass (1968) |

Professional ratings
Review scores
| Source | Rating |
|---|---|
| Allmusic | link |

Herb Alpert's Ninth is the ninth album by Herb Alpert and the Tijuana Brass, released in 1967. It reached No. 4 on the Billboard 200 chart and spent 18 weeks in the Top 40. Its cover, in addition to containing some still photos from Brass concerts, includes a pop-culture joke: it shows Ludwig van Beethoven appearing to wear a sweatshirt bearing Alpert's face at a time when sweatshirts bearing Beethoven's face were popularized by Howard Gossage. The title was also a play on Beethoven's Ninth Symphony, though no part of Beethoven's work actually appears in the album tracks. However, the album contains a medley of music from the opera Carmen, centering on "Habanera" and also including portions of some of the group's earlier hits: "Spanish Flea", "A Taste of Honey", "Whipped Cream", "What Now My Love", "Zorba the Greek" and "Tijuana Taxi".

== Overview ==
The album otherwise features the usual collection of lively pop hit covers, along with a song called "A Banda" that is in the style of some of the group's earlier hits. The band's leisurely rendition of "The Trolley Song" was in deliberate contrast to that of the well-known energetic version originally sung by Judy Garland in the film Meet Me in St. Louis. Other old songs include the Cole Porter standard "My Heart Belongs to Daddy", originally sung by Mary Martin, and "The Love Nest", best known as the radio and TV theme of the George Burns and Gracie Allen programs. Juxtaposed with those old songs is a rendition of the Beatles' "With a Little Help From My Friends", its instrumentation emphasizing the monotonal aspects of Ringo Starr's vocals.

The album also features an unusual original entry in the form of a mournful, minor-key melody called "Bud", which was written "In memory of our dear friend Ervan (Bud) Coleman" (who had died from surgery complications on May 26, 1967 at age 45, before the album was completed) and was also credited as being authored by Coleman and his wife Eleanor. Coleman was the composer of several Brass tunes (notably "Tijuana Taxi") and also played guitar, mandolin and banjo on several of the group's tracks. He was also a key member of Julius Wechter's Baja Marimba Band (their tribute to him, "For Bud", appears on their 1968 album Do You Know the Way To San Jose?). In addition to the usual brass, the song features Spanish guitar.

Collaborating with Alpert in the production was his usual cadre of musicians, the Tijuana Brass, who are also featured on the album cover: Nick Ceroli (drums), Bob Edmondson (trombone), Tonni Kalash (trumpet), Lou Pagani (piano), John Pisano (guitar) and Pat Senatore (bass).

== Track listing ==
=== Side 1 ===
1. "A Banda" (Chico Buarque de Hollanda) – 2:10
2. "My Heart Belongs to Daddy" (Cole Porter) – 2:00
3. "The Trolley Song" (Hugh Martin, Ralph Blane) – 2:39
4. "The Happening" (Brian Holland, Lamont Dozier, Edward Holland, Jr., Frank DeVol) – 2:26
5. "'Bud'" (Ervan "Bud" Coleman, Eleanor Coleman) – 3:38
6. "Love So Fine" (Tony Asher, Roger Nichols) – 2:14

=== Side 2 ===
1. "The Love Nest" (Otto Harbach, Louis Hirsch) – 1:59
2. "With a Little Help from My Friends" (John Lennon, Paul McCartney) – 2:38
3. "Flea Bag" (Julius Wechter) – 2:04
4. "Cowboys and Indians" (Sol Lake) – 2:52
5. "Carmen" (Georges Bizet, arranged by Alpert & Peter Matz) – 3:39

== Charts ==
| Chart (1967) | Peak position |
|---|---|
| US Billboard Top LPs | 4 |
