= S.R.O. (album) =

Studio album by Herb Alpert & the Tijuana Brass
- Released: November 1966
- Recorded: 1966
- Studios: Gold Star (Hollywood, California); Sunset Sound (Hollywood, California)
- Genres: Easy listening, jazz pop
- Label: A&M
- Producers: Herb Alpert, Jerry Moss

Herb Alpert & the Tijuana Brass chronology
What Now My Love (1966)	S.R.O. (1966)	Sounds Like... (1967)

S.R.O., is an album by Herb Alpert & the Tijuana Brass, released in 1966. The title stands for "Standing Room Only," which is a term used to describe a sold-out performance where all the available seats are taken and only standing room remains. The album features the hit singles "Work Song" and "Mame," as well as other popular tracks such as "Flamingo" and "Our Day Will Come." It was the seventh album released by the group and reached No. 2 on the Billboard 200 chart.

== Background ==
The album includes work by Burt Bacharach and Hal David, as well as the band's cover of "Mame" (from the hit musical of the same name), which was the first of the group's recordings to include solo vocals by Alpert; he and the group sing the chorus in the middle of the otherwise-instrumental rendition. Released as a single, "Mame" reached No. 19 on the Billboard Hot 100 chart in November 1966. "The Work Song", which features the "ping" sound effect of a hammer or pickaxe hitting rocks or other solid objects, reached No. 18 in July, and "Flamingo" peaked at No. 28 in September. The album reached No. 2 on the Billboard 200 chart.

S.R.O., an acronym for standing-room only, is a reference to the group's frequently sold-out concerts.

"Bean Bag" became famous in the UK as the theme song of the popular long-running game show It's a Knockout, and as a prize cue for the game show The Guinness Game.

The Dixieland-inspired "Wall Street Rag" was not the Scott Joplin song of the same name, but was composed by Alpert associate and Baja Marimba Band member Bud Coleman.

"For Carlos" was covered by jazz guitarist Wes Montgomery as "Wind Song".

== Critical reception ==
Professional ratings
Review scores
Source	Rating
Allmusic	3/5 stars

In his retrospective review for Allmusic, music critic Richard S. Ginell wrote "The arrangements are very tightly knit and don't allow much room for spontaneity, but they still sound fresh and uninhibited, and Alpert often allows the flavor of jazz to come through more clearly... Though S.R.O. only went to number two on the LP charts, Alpert's creativity and popularity were still peaking."

== Track listing ==
=== Side 1 ===
1. "Our Day Will Come" (Mort Garson, Bob Hilliard) – 2:21
2. "Mexican Road Race" (Sol Lake) – 2:30
3. "I Will Wait for You" (Michel Legrand, Jacques Demy, Norman Gimbel) – 3:15
4. "Bean Bag" (John Pisano, Julius Wechter, Herb Alpert) – 1:58
5. "The Wall Street Rag" (Ervan Coleman) – 2:25
6. "Work Song" (Nat Adderley, Oscar Brown, Jr.) – 2:10

=== Side 2 ===
1. "Mame" (Jerry Herman) – 2:08
2. "Blue Sunday" (Julius Wechter) – 2:49
3. "Don't Go Breaking My Heart" (Burt Bacharach, Hal David) – 2:38
4. "For Carlos" (John Pisano, Nick Ceroli, Herb Alpert) – 2:46
5. "Freight Train Joe" (John Pisano) – 2:37
6. "Flamingo" (Ted Grouya, Edmond Anderson) – 2:25

== Personnel ==
Along with Alpert, the musicians pictured on the album cover (excepting Julius Wechter) are:

- Nick Ceroli – drums
- Bob Edmondson – trombone
- Tonni Kalash – trumpet
- Lou Pagani – piano
- John Pisano – guitar
- Pat Senatore – bass
- Julius Wechter – marimba, vibes

== Charts ==
Chart (1966)	Peak position
US Billboard Top LPs	2
