= Whipped Cream & Other Delights =

Studio album by Herb Alpert's Tijuana Brass
- Released: April 1965
- Studios: Gold Star (Hollywood, California)
- Genres: Easy listening; jazz pop
- Length: 28:22
- Label: A&M
- Producers: Herb Alpert, Jerry Moss

Herb Alpert's Tijuana Brass chronology
South of the Border (1964)	Whipped Cream & Other Delights (1965)	!!Going Places!! (1965)

Singles from Whipped Cream
- 1. "Whipped Cream" Released: February 1965; 2. "A Taste of Honey" Released: August 1965

Professional ratings
Review scores
Source	Rating
Allmusic	5/5 stars
Record Mirror	3/5 stars

Whipped Cream & Other Delights is the fourth album by Herb Alpert & the Tijuana Brass, released on A&M Records in 1965. It is arguably the band's most popular release. The cover art has become a piece of pop culture art with a place in the Smithsonian.

== Overview ==
This album saw the band nearly abandoning its Mexican-themed music, featuring mostly instrumental arrangements of popular songs, and also generating some major pop hits for the first time since "The Lonely Bull". One "tradition" of the early Brass was to include a number rendered in "strip-tease" fashion, and this album's entry for that style was "Love Potion No. 9".

== Album cover ==
The album cover features American model and artist, Dolores Erickson seemingly covered in whipped cream. It became a classic pop culture icon and is one of the most recognizable and parodied album covers of all time.

== Track listing ==
Side 1

1. "A Taste of Honey" (Bobby Scott, Ric Marlow) – 2:43
2. "Green Peppers" (Sol Lake) – 1:31
3. "Tangerine" (Johnny Mercer, Victor Schertzinger) – 2:46
4. "Bittersweet Samba" (Sol Lake) – 1:46
5. "Lemon Tree" (Will Holt) – 2:23
6. "Whipped Cream" (Naomi Neville) – 2:33

Side 2

7. "Love Potion No. 9" (Jerry Leiber and Mike Stoller) – 3:02
8. "El Garbanzo" (Sol Lake) – 2:13
9. "Ladyfingers" (Toots Thielemans) – 2:43
10. "Butterball" (Mike Henderson) – 2:12
11. "Peanuts" (Luis Guerrero) – 2:09
12. "Lollipops and Roses" (Tony Velona) – 2:27

=== 2005 CD reissue bonus tracks ===
1. "Rosemary" (Unused Studio Track) (Herb Alpert)
2. "Blueberry Park" (Unused Studio Track) (Herb Alpert)

== Popularity ==
The album spent eight weeks at Number 1 on the Billboard album charts beginning November 27, 1965. In all, the album spent 141 weeks in the Top 40, and 61 weeks in the Top Ten. In total it spent 185 weeks on the chart.

The spring and summer of 1966 was the high-water mark of the band's album sales. For the week ending May 21, 1966, Whipped Cream & Other Delights, at No. 8, was one of five Tijuana Brass albums listed in the top 20 of Billboard magazine’s chart of Top LPs. The others were What Now My Love (2), Going Places (4), South of the Border (17), and The Lonely Bull (20).

Three weeks later, for the week ending June 11, 1966, Whipped Cream & Other Delights came in at No. 5, and was one of three Tijuana Brass albums to make the top 5 of the Top LPs chart, along with Going Places (4) and What Now My Love (1). The feat was repeated the following week, with What Now holding at 1, Whipped Cream at 3, and Going Places at 5. Only The Beatles had previously achieved this (May 2, 1964) by having all of the Billboard top 5 singles, and only Prince (May 14, 2016) and Taylor Swift (December 9, 2023) have since repeated it.

== Influence ==
Whipped Cream & Other Delights sold over 6 million copies in the United States and the album cover alone is considered a classic pop culture icon. Created by A&M art director Peter Whorf, it featured model Dolores Erickson wearing chiffon and shaving cream. The picture was taken at a time when Erickson was three months pregnant. The album cover was so popular with Alpert fans that, during concerts, when about to play the song "Whipped Cream," Alpert would jokingly tell the audience, "Sorry, we can't play the album cover for you!"

The art was parodied by several groups including once A&M band Soul Asylum, who made fun of the liner notes along with the back cover on their 1989 EP Clam Dip & Other Delights.

Singles taken from the album included "A Taste of Honey," "Whipped Cream" and "Lollipops and Roses". The latter two of these were eventually featured on the ABC TV series The Dating Game: "Whipped Cream" as the intro to the bachelorette, and "Lollipops and Roses" when the bachelor(ette) learned about the person chosen for the date. "Spanish Flea", a song taken from the Tijuana Brass's next album, Going Places, was used as the theme for the bachelor.

Until this album, Alpert had used Los Angeles area studio musicians to back him on his records. On this album, eventual members of the Tijuana Brass (John Pisano, guitar and Bob Edmondson, trombone) were featured as well as elite session musicians from the Wrecking Crew: Hal Blaine (drums), Carol Kaye (electric bass), Chuck Berghofer (double bass), and Russell Bridges (who would later become famous in his own right as Leon Russell). With the success of Whipped Cream & Other Delights came huge demands for concert appearances. It was at this time that Alpert formed the public version of the Tijuana Brass, which included Pisano, Edmondson, Nick Ceroli (drums), Pat Senatore (bass), Tonni Kalash (trumpet), Lou Pagani (piano), and Julius Wechter on marimba and vibes (studio only).

A remix of the album was released in 2006 on the Shout Factory label with model Bree Condon "clothed" on the cover in a similar fashion to the original.

"Ladyfingers" was featured in the fifth episode, "The Past", of the post-apocalyptic television series Fallout.

== Personnel ==
- Guitar – John Pisano
- Bass – Carol Kaye
- Piano – Lou Pagani, Leon Russell
- Drums – Hal Blaine, Nick Ceroli
- Double bass – Chuck Berghofer, Pat Senatore
- Trombone – Bob Edmondson
- Trumpet – Herb Alpert, Tonni Kalash

== Charts ==
Chart (1965–1966)	Peak position
US Billboard Top LPs	1
