= What Now My Love =

What Now My Love may refer to:

- "What Now My Love" (song), a popular song, recorded by many artists
- What Now My Love (album), an album by Herb Alpert and the Tijuana Brass 1966, that includes a version of the song
