= What Now My Love (album) =

Studio album by Herb Alpert & the Tijuana Brass
- Released: May 9, 1966
- Studio: Gold Star (Hollywood, California)
- Genre: Easy listening, jazz pop
- Label: A&M
- Producer: Herb Alpert, Jerry Moss

Herb Alpert & the Tijuana Brass chronology
!!Going Places!! (1965)	What Now My Love (1966)	S.R.O. (1966)

What Now My Love is the sixth album by Herb Alpert & the Tijuana Brass, released in 1966. It remained at number 1 on the Billboard Album chart for nine weeks, the second longest of any album released by the group. The cover photo, an outtake from the photo shoot for Alpert's 1964 South of the Border album, features model Sandra Moss at the Patio del Moro apartment complex in West Hollywood.

== Popularity and critical reception ==
Professional ratings
Review scores
Source	Rating
Allmusic	3.5/5 stars
Record Mirror	4/5 stars

In his retrospective review for Allmusic, music critic Richard S. Ginell wrote, "With this album, Herb Alpert and the Tijuana Brass settle into their hitmaking groove, the once strikingly eclectic elements of Dixieland, pop, rock, and mariachi becoming more smoothly integrated within Alpert's infectious 'Ameriachi' blend."

The spring and summer of 1966 was the high-water mark of the band's album sales. For the week ending May 21, 1966, What Now My Love, at No. 2, was one of five Tijuana Brass albums listed in the top twenty of Billboard magazine’s Top LPs chart. The others were Going Places (4), Whipped Cream & Other Delights (8), South of the Border (17), and The Lonely Bull (20).

Three weeks later, for the week ending June 11, 1966, What Now My Love held No. 1, and was one of three Tijuana Brass albums to make the top five of the Top LPs chart. The feat was repeated the following week, with What Now holding at 1, Whipped Cream at 3, and Going Places at 5.

== Track listing ==
=== Side 1 ===
1. "What Now My Love" (Gilbert Bécaud, Carl Sigman) - 2:18
2. "Freckles" (Ervan Coleman) - 2:12
3. "Memories of Madrid" (Sol Lake) - 2:23
4. "It Was a Very Good Year" (Ervin Drake) - 3:37
5. "So What's New?" (John Pisano) - 2:07
6. "Plucky" (Herb Alpert, Pisano) - 2:21

=== Side 2 ===
1. "Magic Trumpet" (Bert Kaempfert) - 2:18
2. "Cantina Blue" (Sol Lake) - 2:34
3. "Brasilia" (Julius Wechter) - 2:30
4. "If I Were a Rich Man" (Sheldon Harnick, Jerry Bock) - 2:33
5. "Five Minutes More" (Jule Styne, Sammy Cahn) - 1:53
6. "The Shadow of Your Smile" (Johnny Mandel, Paul Francis Webster) - 3:28

== Chart positions ==
Year	Chart	Peak Position
1966	US Top LP's (Billboard)	1
1966	AUS KMT Top Albums	1
