= The Lonely Bull =

The Lonely Bull may refer to:

- The Lonely Bull (song), a 1962 song by Herb Alpert & the Tijuana Brass
- The Lonely Bull (album), a 1962 album by Herb Alpert & the Tijuana Brass
- The Lonely Bull, 1962 album by the Arena Brass, (No. 130 US)
