= Whipped Cream (song) =

Single by Herb Alpert & the Tijuana Brass

from the album Whipped Cream & Other Delights
- B-side: "Last Mananitas"
- Released: February 1965
- Recorded: 1964
- Genre: Pop
- Length: 2:33
- Label: A&M Records
- Songwriter(s): Allen Toussaint
- Producer(s): Herb Alpert, Jerry Moss

Herb Alpert & the Tijuana Brass singles chronology
"The Mexican Shuffle" (1964)	"Whipped Cream" (1965)	"A Taste of Honey" (1965)

"Whipped Cream" is an instrumental most famously recorded by Herb Alpert & the Tijuana Brass. It is the title track of their 1965 LP, Whipped Cream & Other Delights, and was released as the lead single from the album. The song was written by Allen Toussaint under the pen name of Naomi Neville (after his mother), and originally recorded by The Stokes.

Alpert's recording of "Whipped Cream" became a hit on the U.S. Billboard Hot 100 (#68) and Adult Contemporary chart (#13). It was also a minor hit in Australia. It later was used as part of the music for the ABC television show The Dating Game.

== Personnel ==
According to the AFM contract, the following people played on the track.

- Herb Alpert
- Frank DeVito
- Carol Kaye
- Ervan Coleman
- Bob Edmondson
- Richard Leith
- Pete Jolly
- William Green
- David Alpert
- Virgil Evans
- Don Ralke

== Chart history ==
Chart (1965)	Peak position
Australia (Kent Music Report)	99
U.S. Billboard Hot 100	68
U.S. Billboard Adult Contemporary	13
U.S. Cash Box Top 100	85
