= Going Places (Herb Alpert and the Tijuana Brass album) =

1965 studio album by Herb Alpert and the Tijuana Brass

Studio album by Herb Alpert and the Tijuana Brass
- Released: September 13, 1965
- Genres: Jazz pop, easy listening, mariachi
- Length: 29:27
- Label: A&M
- Producers: Herb Alpert, Jerry Moss

Herb Alpert and the Tijuana Brass chronology
Whipped Cream & Other Delights (1965)	Going Places (1965)	What Now My Love (1966)

Going Places (stylized as !!GOING PLACES!!) is the fifth album by Herb Alpert and the Tijuana Brass. It was originally released by A&M Records in 1965 and has appeared in many formats.

== Background ==
The group's title reverted to its original name for this album; its second, third and fourth albums had been released as Herb Alpert's Tijuana Brass. While the first four Tijuana Brass albums were recorded by Alpert backed by studio musicians, demands for live appearances led to Alpert assembling a touring band. The songs on Going Places are a mixture of sessions featuring Alpert's touring band and those with session musicians, according to the liner notes in the Shout!Factory CD release.

The single version of "Tijuana Taxi" features more of the bicycle-horn sound effects than does the album version. "Tijuana Taxi" and "Spanish Flea" were included as part of the "Carmen" medley on the Herb Alpert's Ninth album. The B-side of the "Taxi" single, "Zorba the Greek", was edited for length and was augmented by live-concert sound effects.

"A Walk in the Black Forest" was a cover of a better-known version of the song that same year by Horst Jankowski. Two years later, the song was featured as the theme of a short-lived game show, Reach for the Stars. The Piggly Wiggly supermarket chain also used it as a theme for its TV commercials. The song "Spanish Flea", composed by Alpert's friend and fellow mariachi band leader Julius Wechter, was one of several Brass tunes heard regularly on The Dating Game.

The album was released in many formats, such as vinyl, 8-track, cassette, open reel and eventually CD. It was reissued in 2005 by the Shout!Factory label as part of the Herb Alpert Signature Series.

== Popularity and critical reception ==
Professional ratings
Review scores
Source	Rating
Allmusic	3.5/5 stars

The spring and summer of 1966 was the high-water mark of the band's album sales. For the week ending May 21, 1966, Going Places was one of five Tijuana Brass albums listed in the top 20 of Billboard's Top LPs, at No. 4. The others were What Now My Love (2), Whipped Cream & Other Delights (8), South of the Border (17), and The Lonely Bull (20).

Three weeks later, for the week ending June 11, 1966, Going Places held at No. 4, and was one of three Tijuana Brass albums to make the top 5 of the Top LPs chart, along with What Now (1) and Whipped Cream (5). The feat was repeated the following week, with What Now holding at 1, Whipped Cream at 3, and Going Places at 5. Only the Beatles had previously achieved this (May 2, 1964), and only Prince (May 14, 2016) and Taylor Swift (December 9, 2023) have since repeated it.

AllMusic critic Rick Ginell rated the record 3.5 of a possible 5 stars, writing, "this album captures them at the peak of their exuberance.... No other TJB record has as much unbuttoned fun and humor as this one—and not surprisingly, it spent six weeks at number one in 1966."

== Track listing ==
LP
Side 1

1. "Tijuana Taxi" (Ervan Coleman) – 2:05
2. "I'm Getting Sentimental over You" (George Bassman) – 1:59
3. "More and More Amor" (Sol Lake) – 2:44
4. "Spanish Flea" (Julius Wechter) – 2:07
5. "Mae" (Riz Ortolani) – 2:27
6. "3rd Man Theme" (Anton Karas) – 2:28

Side 2

1. "Walk, Don't Run" (Johnny Smith) – 1:50
2. "Felicia" (John Pisano) – 2:45
3. "And the Angels Sing" (Johnny Mercer, Ziggy Elman) – 2:34
4. "Cinco De Mayo" (Chris Montez) – 2:15
5. "A Walk in the Black Forest" (Horst Jankowski) – 1:48
6. "Zorba the Greek" (Mikis Theodorakis) – 4:25

Reel-to-reel tape

The album was issued twice on open-reel tape, the first edition (AMB-112, distributed by Ampex on behalf of A&M Records) presents the tracks in the same order as the LP. Because of the running-time differences, Side A includes a significant blank space at the beginning of the program, which allowed for a shorter break at the side change. In 1968, A&M reissued the open-reel tape (OR-4112) with an altered track sequence to balance the running times of the two sides.

Reel-to-reel tape A&M reissue
- Side 1

1. "Tijuana Taxi" – 2:05
2. "Walk, Don't Run" – 1:50
3. "Spanish Flea" – 2:07
4. "More and More Amor" – 2:44
5. "A Walk in the Black Forest" – 1:48
6. "Zorba the Greek" – 4:25

- Side 2

1. "Mae" – 2:27
2. "Cinco De Mayo" – 2:15
3. "Felicia" – 2:45
4. "I'm Getting Sentimental Over You" – 1:59
5. "And the Angels Sing" – 2:34
6. "The Third Man Theme" – 2:28

== In popular culture ==
"Tijuana Taxi" was featured in the "On a Clear Day I Can't See My Sister" episode of Fox's animated series The Simpsons, the third episode ("Becoming Mr. Playboy") of the Amazon original series American Playboy: The Hugh Hefner Story and the "Tube Stakes" episode of the comedy series King of Queens (season 2, episode 5). The song was also used in KCET's Kids Club birthday promo on PBS Kids. It has also been used as the run-out music for Leyton Orient F.C. since the 1980s.

In series 2, episode 7 of the popular podcast My Dad Wrote a Porno, while visiting a brothel in Amsterdam's Red Light District, protagonist Belinda Blumenthal, who is accompanied by Russian entrepreneur Grigor Kilanski, is treated to a live performance of "A Walk In The Black Forest" by Parisian strip tease artiste Chantelle. Because of this, hosts of the podcast James Cooper, Alice Levine and Jamie Morton encouraged listeners to buy and stream "A Walk In The Black Forest" by Herb Alpert to get it into the charts. Because of this promotion, the song peaked at #1 on iTunes Jazz Charts in the UK, US and Norway, and overall reached #79 on the main iTunes Jazz Charts.

== Chart positions ==
Year	Chart	Peak Position
1966	Billboard Pop Albums (Billboard 200)	1
1967	Australian Kent Music Report Albums Chart	1
