= Dolores Erickson =

American artist and model

Dolores Erickson (born September 1935) is an American model and artist. She came to prominence by appearing as a model on a number of album covers, most notably Whipped Cream & Other Delights (1965) by Herb Alpert and the Tijuana Brass.

== Early life and modeling ==
Erickson, the oldest of eight children, was raised first in Port Angeles, Washington, before moving with her family to Seattle, Washington, where she graduated from Cleveland High School in 1954. She started her modeling career at 14 or 15 after winning a contest to model for the Seattle department store Frederick & Nelson. In 1954, she won the Miss Maritime beauty pageant and in 1955 won Miss Greenwood and competed to be Seafair Queen. She was also Miss Longshoreman.

With two fellow Seafair Princesses, future actresses Dorothy Provine and Dyan Cannon, Erickson visited San Francisco, where she found work for Macy's department store, earning $600 weekly at age 19. She left the University of Washington to pursue a modeling career, signing with the Ford Modeling Agency in New York City. Erickson did photo shoots for fashion layouts and for cosmetics companies such as Max Factor, and appeared on 13 or 18 album covers for artists such as the Kingston Trio (Sold Out), Cy Coleman (Piano Witchcraft), Nat King Cole (Wild Is Love), and The Sandpipers (Guantanamera).

The modeling led in early 1960 to Paramount Pictures signing her as a contract player. Her contract was later traded to Warner Bros. She was scheduled to appear in the film The Pleasure of His Company and did have roles in Love in a Goldfish Bowl and Jerry Lewis' The Ladies Man. She also appeared in episodes of the TV detective shows Surfside 6 and 77 Sunset Strip and the comedy-drama Father Knows Best.

== Whipped Cream & Other Delights ==
Art director Peter Whorf, at the time engaged to Erickson's best friend, used Erickson on many Capitol Records shoots. During this time, she became acquainted with trumpeter and A&M Records co-founder Herb Alpert, and watched part of the recording of The Lonely Bull album in Alpert's garage in 1962.

The photo shoot for the cover of the 1965 Herb Alpert and the Tijuana Brass album Whipped Cream & Other Delights — which remained in the Billboard top 10 for 61 weeks, and whose sexy cover became a cultural touchstone — began in mid-morning, went on through the afternoon, and paid Erickson approximately $1,500 plus expenses. The shoot took place in Whorf's studio, a converted garage. Erickson, 29 years old and three months pregnant, sat on a stool with a white Christmas blanket covering her from the waist down, and wore a bikini with the straps down. She then was covered with shaving cream, which (unlike whipped cream) would not melt under the hot photographic lights, with a dollop of whipped cream on her head. As the shoot progressed, the shaving cream began to slide down her breasts slightly.

Months later, Whorf sent her two outtakes. When she saw the more risqué pictures, she took them over to a girlfriend's house and hid them behind the friend's refrigerator, not wanting her conservative husband to find them. Initially, Alpert felt the cover image "was maybe pushing it a little too far ... I thought the censors would be down on it. But in 2006 it looks pretty darn tame."

== Later years ==
In the 1970s, Erickson returned to college, studying art in Portland, Oregon. She began painting, and owned the art gallery The Wild Deer, in Kelso, Washington, for a decade. As of the mid-2000s, she continued to paint what one newspaper called "Impressionist-style works in her duplex on Columbia Heights."

== Personal life ==
In the early 1960s Erickson was living in San Francisco. After signing a contract with Paramount Studios she moved to Los Angeles. Erickson later spent a year in Mexico modeling on contract for Lonka Becker before moving to New York, where she met and married businessman Bert Neirick, with whom she had a son, Brett. The couple divorced, and in the 1970s she married attorney Bob Huffhines Jr. They resided in Longview, Washington and were married for 42 years before divorcing.
