= South of the Border (Herb Alpert's Tijuana Brass album) =

Studio album by Herb Alpert's Tijuana Brass
- Released: October 1964
- Studios: Gold Star (Hollywood, California)
- Genres: Easy Listening, jazz pop
- Length: 27:07
- Labels: A&M; A&M LP 108 / A&M SP108
- Producers: Herb Alpert, Jerry Moss

Herb Alpert's Tijuana Brass chronology
Volume 2 (1963)	South of the Border (1964)	Whipped Cream & Other Delights (1965)

South of the Border is the third album by American band Herb Alpert & the Tijuana Brass, originally released in 1964. The name of the group, for this album, is "Herb Alpert's Tijuana Brass".

== Background ==
South of the Border was Alpert's third studio album, and fifth gold record. It continued the progression of the Tijuana Brass from its mostly-Mexican sound to a more easy-listening style, with a collection of cover versions of popular songs. Included were "I've Grown Accustomed to Her Face", originally featured in the Broadway musical My Fair Lady, and The Beatles' 1963 hit "All My Loving". It also featured an instrumental cover of its title song, "South of the Border", which was most famously done as a vocal by Frank Sinatra.

One number, a Sol Lake tune called "The Mexican Shuffle", was reworked for a TV ad for a brand of chewing gum, and styled "The Teaberry Shuffle". Bert Kaempfert, author of several songs covered by the Brass, returned the favor by issuing a cover of "The Mexican Shuffle". The track titled "El Presidente", was a reorchestration of Sol Lake's "Winds of Barcelona", which had appeared on Volume 2.

The cover features model Sandra Moss (Mrs. Jerry Moss at the time) at the Patio del Moro apartment complex in West Hollywood.

== Popularity and critical reception ==
Professional ratings
Review scores
Source	Rating
Allmusic	4/5 stars

South of the Border enjoyed sustained popularity. It appeared on the Billboard Top LPs chart for a total of 163 weeks. For the week ending May 21, 1966, South of the Border peaked at No. 17, and was one of five Tijuana Brass albums listed in the top 20 of Billboard Magazine’s chart of Top LPs. The others were What Now My Love (2), Going Places (4), Whipped Cream & Other Delights (8), and The Lonely Bull (20).

In a retrospective review for Allmusic, music critic Lindsay Planer praised the album's variety and described the ballads as "never seeming maudlin or unnecessarily over the top."

== Track listing ==
=== Side 1 ===
1. "South of the Border" (Jimmy Kennedy, Michael Carr) - 2:06
2. "The Girl from Ipanema" (Norman Gimbel, Antônio Carlos Jobim, Vinícius de Moraes) - 2:35
3. "Hello, Dolly!" (Jerry Herman) - 1:55
4. "I've Grown Accustomed to Her Face" (Alan Jay Lerner, Frederick Loewe) - 2:25
5. "Up Cherry Street" (Julius Wechter) - 2:13
6. "Mexican Shuffle" (Sol Lake) - 2:09

=== Side 2 ===
1. "El Presidente" (Sol Lake) - 2:28
2. "All My Loving" (John Lennon, Paul McCartney) - 1:53
3. "Angelito" (René Herrera, René Ornelas) - 2:20
4. "Salud, Amor y Dinero (Health, Love and Money)" (Sol Lake) - 2:05
5. "Número Cinco (Number Five)" (Ervan Coleman) - 2:19
6. "Adiós, Mi Corazón (Goodbye, My Heart)" (Sol Lake) - 2:39

== Charts ==
Chart (1965)	Peak position
US Billboard Top LPs	6
