= Shout! Studios =

American home video and music company

Shout! Factory, LLC
- Logo used since 2023
- Trade name: Shout! Studios
- Formerly: Retropolis Entertainment (2002–2003); Shout! Factory (as trade name; 2003–2023)
- Type: Subsidiary
- Industry: Entertainment
- Founded: April 19, 2002; 24 years ago
- Founders: Richard Foos; Bob Emmer; Garson Foos
- Headquarters: Los Angeles, California, U.S.
- Key people: Richard Foos (CEO); Bob Emmer (COO); Garson Foos (president)
- Products: Home video; Music
- Brands: Scream Factory; Shout! Select; Shout! Kids; Shout! Pictures; Shout! TV
- Parent: Radial Entertainment (2025–present)
- Divisions: Shout! TV; Westchester Films
- Subsidiaries: Mystery Science Theater 3000; Satellite of Love, LLC; Majordomo Records; Biograph Records; New Concorde; Gravitas Ventures
- Website: www.shoutstudios.com

Shout! Factory, LLC doing business as Shout! Studios (stylized as SHOUT! STUDIOS) is an American home video and music distributor founded in 2002 as Retropolis Entertainment. Its video releases, issued in DVD or Blu-ray format, include previously released feature films, vintage and contemporary television series, animation, live music, and comedy specials. Considered a boutique Blu-ray label, Shout! Studios, in addition to its mainline home video releases, also releases films under the sub-labels Scream Factory (for horror film releases), Shout! Select, and Shout! Kids.

Shout! Studios owns and operates Westchester Films, Timeless Media Group, Biograph Records, Majordomo Records, Gravitas Ventures, and Video Time Machine.

== History ==
Retropolis Entertainment was founded on April 19, 2002 by Bob Emmer, Garson Foos, and Richard Foos, three principals from Rhino Records, as the company was negotiating with the five majors for distribution. After selling Rhino to Warner Music Group in 1998, the three set out to launch a new retro pop culture label. The company's first product was Red, White & Rock, a 2002 joint release with PBS station WQED-TV that was produced with Warner Strategic Marketing. In August 2002, Retropolis acquired Biograph Records. Other early releases included blues and jazz CDs from the Biograph label, a Fats Domino CD and DVD, and several documentaries (Superstar: The Life And Times of Andy Warhol, What Happened To Kerouac?). Retropolis was renamed Shout! Factory in April 2003. At that time, Shout! had signed a press and distribution agreement with Sony Music Entertainment. In 2004, Shout! released Freaks and Geeks on DVD, the first television series released on DVD for the company. With 18 episodes, it became one of the most expensive DVDs to produce, costing over a million dollars in music licensing. That same year, they released William Shatner's album Has Been and SCTV box sets.

In 2004, Shout! released an expanded two-disc version of Jim Croce's first record, Facets. In 2004, Shout! purchased the rights to the adult animated series Home Movies and released each season set, and ultimately a complete series box. Other notable releases included a pair of The Electric Company multi-disc sets, the re-envisioned Herb Alpert's Whipped Cream & Other Delights Rewhipped, a series of Elvira's Movie Macabre DVDs and the first of what would be three cover CDs with Matthew Sweet and Susanna Hoffs, called Under The Covers Vol. 1; Sweet himself was also added as a featured solo artist. Shout! acquired the rights to several other television series, including Punky Brewster, The Weird Al Show, and America's Funniest Home Videos.

In 2005, Shout! Factory obtained the rights to Herb Alpert's catalog, launching the Herb Alpert Signature Series of CDs. These included The Lonely Bull, South of the Border, Lost Treasures, Whipped Cream & Other Delights and others. They also got the rights to talk show host Dick Cavett's library and began releasing theme sets focused on rock icons: Ray Charles (including all his visits to the show), John Lennon (The Beatles) and Yoko Ono, and others. They also jumped into children's animation with a deal with DIC Entertainment. Heathcliff And the Catillac Cats was the first release from that deal, followed by The Legend of Zelda, Super Mario Bros. Super Show, Inspector Gadget, Sabrina the Animated Series, and C.O.P.S. The Animated Series. On the sports side, they entered a licensing deal with Major League Baseball, releasing themed and World Series DVDs from 2005 to 2010 and then again from 2016 till present.

By 2007, vintage TV on DVD was a major focus, with season sets of Blossom, McHale's Navy and Ironside, an authorized collection of The Adventures of Ozzie and Harriet, and themed and actor-specific editions of Inside the Actors Studio hitting shelves. Meanwhile, they also began releasing Mickey Hart's catalogs.

In March 2008, Shout! bought the Hightone Records catalog and added musical artists Tom Russell, Joe Ely, and Rosie Flores to its brand. That same year, the company continued ramping up its place as a destination for the release of classic and cult television series by taking over the Mystery Science Theater 3000 DVD series, releasing a 20th anniversary set, and continuing to put out box sets of episodes never before released on DVD.

In 2009, Shout! reached another milestone when it struck a deal with toy/board game company Hasbro, releasing the original Transformers and G.I. Joe animated-series box sets. That same year, it released the first My Little Pony DVD, My Little Pony: Twinkle Wish Collection. Shout! continued to release several Hasbro properties, including the series My Little Pony: Friendship is Magic, until January 1, 2019, when it released its final DVD for that series, Hearts and Hooves.

=== 2010s ===
In 2010, Shout! signed a multi-year deal with Marvel Animation to begin releasing titles by Disney-owned Marvel. This included Super Hero Squad Show and Marvel Knights properties (Astonishing X-Men: Gifted, Black Panther, Iron Man: Extremis, and Spider-Woman). In October of that year, Shout! announced the release of The Larry Sanders Show: The Complete Series, which included all 89 episodes.

In 2011, Shout! Factory made another landmark move when they struck a deal with Viacom-owned Nickelodeon to release the live-action sitcom Hey Dude and the animated Nicktoons: Rocko's Modern Life, Aaahh!!! Real Monsters, Hey Arnold!, The Angry Beavers, CatDog, The Wild Thornberrys, The Adventures of Jimmy Neutron, Boy Genius, and Danny Phantom.

In May 2012, Shout! Factory signed an agreement with Saban Brands to distribute the Beetleborgs, Ninja Turtles: The Next Mutation, the original Power Rangers, and VR Troopers catalogs in North America. In the same month, the company acquired Oregon-based home entertainment company Timeless Media Group, adding more programs to its expanding catalog, such as The Red Skelton Show, Peter Gunn, The Gene Autry Show, The Virginian, Wagon Train, Laramie, as well as the Roy Rogers: King of the Cowboys movie collection.

In June 2012, Shout! Factory announced a horror label called Scream Factory, specializing in classic and cult horror films on Blu-ray and DVD, such as Halloween II, Halloween III: Season of the Witch, They Live, Lifeforce, Deadly Blessing, and others. That same month, Shout! and Frederator founder Fred Seibert acquired Video Time Machine, a decade and genre media-based iOS app, from Original Victories Inc.

In July 2013, Shout! Factory acquired the North American distribution rights to the ITC Entertainment library as part of a deal with UK-based ITV Studios Global Entertainment. The 30+ related tiles included Sophie's Choice, On Golden Pond, Brief Encounter, The Last Unicorn, The Boys From Brazil, and others.

In 2014, the success Shout! was having with complete-series box sets of such series as All in the Family, Route 66, and Barney Miller extended to such properties as The Bob Newhart Show, Hill Street Blues, and a Blu-Ray release of Pee-Wee's Playhouse and The Jeffersons. In 2014, Shout! announced their acquisition of the rights to WKRP in Cincinnati, with the intention of restoring all four seasons of the show "complete" (i.e., complete as legally possible) with their original musical scores. The 2014 release was a monumental event for fans of the show, since the original DVD release in 2007 had been mired in squabbles regarding music rights. In September 2014, Shout! acquired Westchester Films, an independent film company whose library includes the films of Alfred Hitchcock, John Ford, the Marx Brothers, and Orson Welles, as well as eight Godzilla films, among others. That same year, Shout! became the distributor of Super Sentai in North America. In 2015, Shout! released Kyōryū Sentai Zyuranger under the name Super Sentai Zyuranger: The Complete Series with English subtitles.

IFC Midnight partnered with Scream Factory in February 2015 for exclusive home distribution, starting with The Babadook. On February 5, 2015, Shout! Factory launched its flagship TV ad-supported streaming services online and via Roku. Available shows and movies included 16 Werner Herzog films, Roger Corman cult films, and TV shows including Father Knows Best and It's Garry Shandling's Show. In June, Cinedigm took a minority stake in the company, while extending their home entertainment platform distribution agreement. Cinedigm and Shout! would then relaunch the Factory's streaming service and cross market each others' streaming services.

In November 2015, Shout! announced it had acquired the rights to Mystery Science Theater 3000 from Best Brains Inc. and launched a "Bring Back MST3K" Kickstarter with the goal of producing up to 12 new feature-length episodes of the series, with series creator Joel Hodgson serving as executive producer. In January 2016, Concord Bicycle Music bought the HighTone catalog from the company. The same year, Shout! Factory released The Crush under subsidiary brand Scream Factory and Long Way North.

On January 10, 2017, Shout Factory acquired the worldwide television format and ancillary rights to Starcade with plans to reboot the series. On January 17, Shout! Factory announced their acquisition of the broadcast and home media distribution rights for the first three Digimon Adventure tri. films with plans for a dual-language release on DVD and Blu-ray. On May 18, Shout! Factory acquired the North American distribution rights to In This Corner of the World, with a U.S. theatrical release to take place on August 11, co-released by Funimation Films. In October, it was revealed that Shout! Factory would be the distributor for GKIDS' North American re-releases of Studio Ghibli films formerly owned by Disney in the U.S. Titles included My Neighbor Totoro, Ponyo, Princess Mononoke, Howl's Moving Castle, Kiki's Delivery Service, and Spirited Away. Afterwards, Shout! began distributing other GKIDS films, like Summer Wars and Wolf Children. In April 2025, it was announced that Shout! would release a steelbook Blu-ray of Studio Ghibli's Grave of the Fireflies, which had been out of print for years.

In November 2017, Shout! Factory announced the formation of Shout! Studios, a production and distribution arm that specializes in content development. The first films to be distributed under the new banner included Humor Me, The House of Tomorrow, and Izzy Gets the F Across Town, all slated for 2018 premieres, along with Basmati Blues and Big Fish & Begonia (partnering with Funimation Films again for theatrical distribution).

In March 2018, Shout! Factory teamed up with China-based Ace Film to acquired the New Horizons film library from its founder Roger Corman. Shout! will distribute this catalog in North America, Europe, Russia, and Australia. Shout! also expanded its North American distribution deal with ITV Studios Global Entertainment to cover over 135 films and TV series from ITV's library, with TV series includingThe Prisoner, Hammer House of Horror, several Gerry Anderson TV shows, and others. In August, Shout! struck a multi-year deal with Sesame Workshop to distribute the Sesame Street home video library in North America, taking over from Warner Bros. Home Entertainment.

=== 2020s–present ===
In March 2020, Shout! Factory acquired a mix of worldwide, domestic, and international broadcast and select streaming rights to more than 20 TV series and movies and 900 hours of programming. This included Stephen J. Cannell's catalog of 1970s to 1990s shows, such as 21 Jump Street, Hunter, Wiseguy, The Commish, The Greatest American Hero, and Riptide.

In July 2020, Shout! Factory announced a multi-year deal with Alliance Entertainment and Mill Creek Entertainment, which granted the exclusive SVOD and AVOD digital rights to the Ultra series, 1,100 episodes and 20 films previously acquired by Mill Creek. Shout! Factory will stream the catalog in North American countries (U.S. and Canada) through their services, Shout! TV and TokuSHOUTsu.

In February 2021, Shout! Factory made a deal with the animation studio Laika to release their films on home media in the United States. The deal included Laika's first four films, originally released by Focus Features, as well as new bonus material and packaging for each release.

In February 2022, Shout! Factory acquired the American distribution rights to the TV series ALF, including its animated prequel series and its spin-off ALF Tales from Alien Productions. That same month, Shout! entered into an exclusive all-rights distribution arrangement with Amcomri Entertainment's United Kingdom-based subsidiary company, 101 Films. Earlier that week, Shout! also acquired the library of Halcyon Studios, a division of Chicken Soup for the Soul Entertainment.

In August 2022, Shout! Factory signed a worldwide distribution deal with The Jim Henson Company to bring 13 of Henson's programs and specials to home entertainment and streaming platforms in all territories, including Farscape and The Storyteller. A similar worldwide distribution agreement with Henson went into effect on January 1, 2024 for streaming, video-on-demand, broadcast, digital download, packaged media and certain non-theatrical rights for the films Labyrinth and The Dark Crystal, as well as behind-the-scenes specials, Inside the Labyrinth and The World of the Dark Crystal.

In July 2023, Shout! Factory announced it had signed a North American distribution deal with Aardman Animations, covering four of Aardman's properties: Morph, Wallace and Gromit (except The Curse of the Were-Rabbit), Shaun the Sheep and Timmy Time. That same month, the company announced its rebranding to Shout! Studios to match with its film distribution division.

In May 2024, Shout! Studios took over the U.S. distribution rights to Tatsunoko Production's 1967 anime Speed Racer from Crunchyroll, which began with the digital release of the original television series of the same name and its Japanese-language version on June 1 of that year.

In October 2024, Shout! Studios announced a multi-title distribution deal with Nash Entertainment to bring its library of unscripted shows to streaming and other platforms worldwide.

In January 2025, Shout! acquired the rights to the Golden Princess movie library, including 156 Hong Kong cinema classics. Later that month, Shout! announced it would be bringing five seminal Jet Li martial arts classics to 4K resolution.

In April 2025, Shout! Studios acquired Gravitas Ventures from Anthem Sports & Entertainment, planning to use the company as a separate banner along with the main Shout! brand.

In July 2025, Shout! Studios' parent company Oaktree Capital Management acquired FilmRise, and merged them into a holding company named Radial Entertainment. The merger resulted in layoffs at Radial Entertainment in October, with reportedly 14% of staff across finance, marketing, operations, and e-commerce facing cuts. Also in July, Shout! appointed former Crunchyroll director Thomas Breckenridge to its newly created role of Director of Product Development and Marketing (Anime Content).

In October 2025, Shout! Studios' new parent company, Radial Entertainment, acquired U.S. distribution rights for Conan O’Brien’s 11-season TBS series. Later that month, Shout! announced it was ending its “Physical Forever Club” online store membership program. Initiated in late 2024, the free program offered 3% store credit for purchasing Blu-rays and DVDs at the ShoutFactory.com online store.

In November 2025, it was announced that Shout! Factory's 4K and Blu-ray releases, including its Scream Factory horror catalog, would be available through GRUV Entertainment's GRUV.com moving forward, after ShoutFactory.com discontinued its standalone site. Gruv.com is an online shop run by Universal Pictures.

In January 2026, it was announced that Shout! would be releasing a 4K Ultra HD limited-edition Steelbook of End of Watch (2012), a crime drama starring Jake Gyllenhaal and Michael Peña.

In early 2026, it was announced that GKIDS and Shout! Studios' Little Amélie or the Character of Rain (2025) had been nominated at the BAFTAs (British Academy of Film and Television Arts), Critics Choice Awards, Golden Globes, and Oscars in the best animated feature category. The film would debut on Blu-ray on March 10, 2026.

In March 2026, RiffTrax and Shout! Studios announced that almost $6 million had been raised through a Kickstarter campaign to create new episodes of Mystery Science Theater 3000 (MST3K) and that new episodes were in the works. Radial Entertainment, the entertainment company formed from the merger of Shout! Studios and FilmRise, obtained full ownership of the MST3K brand in January 2026.

In April 2026, Shout! Studios and GKIDS announced the release Satoshi Kon’s directorial debut Perfect Blue (1997) on 4K UHD Blu-Ray. It would be released on June 16 as an all-new limited edition 3-Disc SteelBook.

== Licensing deals ==
As of 2024, Shout! Factory has agreements with companies (American and foreign): Warner Bros. Discovery Home Entertainment, Paramount Home Entertainment, Universal Pictures Home Entertainment, MGM Home Entertainment, Sony Pictures Home Entertainment, WildBrain Limited, Corus Entertainment, Hasbro Entertainment, GKIDS, BBC Studios, Eleven Arts, Sesame Workshop, IFC Films, ITV Studios, Major League Baseball, Motion Picture Corporation of America, the estate of Stephen J. Cannell, The Jim Henson Company, Chicken Soup for the Soul (including Hallmark Entertainment and Sonar Entertainment libraries), Alien Productions, Library Rights Company (UK), Ltd., the Zelus Film Holding Company (including the Intermedia and Largo Entertainment libraries), Satellite of Love, StudioCanal, Joe Camp, Toei Animation, Toei Company, Laika, Aardman Animations and Tatsunoko Production.

Releases under these agreements have included the complete Joss Whedon/John Cassaday series of Astonishing X-Men, plus Thor & Loki: Blood Brothers and Iron Man: Extremis on DVD and Blu-ray; the original Transformers, G.I. Joe, Jem and My Little Pony cartoons, My Little Pony: Friendship Is Magic, Power Rangers, VR Troopers, Sesame Street, Super Sentai, Kamen Rider, some Nickelodeon series such as Rocko's Modern Life, Hey Arnold!, The Wild Thornberrys, CatDog, Danny Phantom, Hey Dude, The Angry Beavers, Aaahh!!! Real Monsters, The Adventures of Jimmy Neutron, Boy Genius (under license from Paramount Home Entertainment), some Joe Camp in Benji: Ultimate Collection (under license from Mulberry Square Productions), The Magic Snowflake (under license from Lionsgate Home Entertainment in 77-minute format), FernGully: The Last Rainforest (under license from 20th Century Studios) and Gravity Falls (under license from Walt Disney Studios Home Entertainment in one at a time).

In mid-2012, Shout! Factory announced a horror sub-label called Scream Factory, specializing in vintage and cult horror films. The company announced its first slate of releases in May 2017, which included Halloween II, Halloween III: Season of the Witch, They Live, Terror Train, The Island, and others being released to DVD and Blu-ray. Other notable Scream Factory releases have included The Howling, The Return of the Living Dead, and Evil Dead, which all came as 4K steelbook editions.

In July 2020, Shout! Factory announced a multi-year deal with Alliance Entertainment (formerly Mill Creek Entertainment), which granted the exclusive SVOD and AVOD digital rights to the Ultra series, 1,100 episodes and 20 films previously acquired by Mill Creek. Shout! Factory will stream the catalog in North American countries (U.S. and Canada) through their services, Shout! TV and TokuSHOUTsu.

== Related companies ==
In 2012, Shout! Factory acquired Oregon-based home entertainment company Timeless Media Group. This added several TV programs to its ever-expanding catalog, including The Red Skelton Show, Peter Gunn, The Gene Autry Show, The Virginian, Wagon Train, and Laramie, along with the Roy Rogers: King of the Cowboys movie collection, over 50 documentaries, and others.

Shout! Factory also acquired blues/roots label HighTone Records in 2008 and continued to oversee its back catalog until 2016 when Concord Bicycle Music bought the label.

== Units ==
- Majordomo Records – an indie record label and division of Shout! Factory
- Roger Corman's Cult Classics – sub-label started in 2010
- Timeless Media Group – sub-label acquired in 2012
- Scream Factory – sub-label started in 2012
- Shout! Select – sub-label started in 2016
- Shout! TV – streaming service for movies, TV series, and original programming
- Scream Factory TV – horror, science-fiction, and thriller movie streaming service started in 2022
- Shout! Cult – cult movie streaming service
- Shout! Studios – film and TV production and distribution arm started in November 2017
- Westchester Films – distributor of classic films from Orson Welles, Alfred Hitchcock, John Ford, the Marx Brothers, and others acquired in 2014
- ITV Studios – distributor of international TV series
