= Baja Marimba Band =

American musical group

The Baja Marimba Band was an American musical group led by marimba player Julius Wechter. Formed by producer Herb Alpert after his own Tijuana Brass, the Baja Marimba Band outlasted the Tijuana Brass by several years in part due to TV producer Chuck Barris, who included the group's music on his game shows in the 1970s.

== History ==
=== Origin ===
During his youth, Julius Wechter took up several percussion instruments including the vibes and marimba. In 1956 his group the Julius Wechter Quartet released a jazz album entitled Linear Sketches.

In 1958, Julius joined Martin Denny's band where he played marimba (replacing Arthur Lyman) as well as numerous other percussion instruments. Four years later he was paid $15 as a session man on Herb Alpert's debut album, The Lonely Bull. Wechter soon composed "Spanish Flea" for Alpert, which became a hit for him. Alpert encouraged Wechter to form his own group, The Baja Marimba Band, to help cash in on the faux-Mexican popularity of Alpert's own Tijuana Brass.

=== Formation ===
In 1962, the Baja Marimba Band was formed using session men to supplement Wechter. These musicians included, at one time or another, Roy Caton, Tony Terran, Pete Jolly, Lew McCreary, Nick Ceroli, Hal Blaine, Tommy Tedesco, Leon Russell, and Emil Richards.

The band hit the charts with its first single "Comin' in the Back Door" and recorded a dozen albums for A&M, as well as being Alpert's support act. The main lineup from 1965 to 1971 was Bernie Fleischer on reeds, Ervan "Bud" Coleman on guitar (replaced upon Coleman's death in 1967 by Charlie Chiarenza), Frank DeCaro on rhythm guitar, Dave Wells on trombone, Lee Katzman on trumpet, Curry Tjader on percussion, Mel Pollan on Fender bass, and Frank DeVito on drums. Most if not all of the band's musicians were seasoned jazz musicians who performed with such artists as Woody Herman, Stan Kenton, Don Ellis, Terry Gibbs, Buddy DeFranco, Charlie Parker, and Dizzy Gillespie.

The group would appear on stage dressed in sombreros and old clothes, with fake mustaches, smoking cigars, and drinking beer, all of which was regarded as humorously exaggerated Mexican stereotypes. The group appeared in goofy group photos on their album covers, stylishly created by Peter Whorf Graphics, and added a comedic allure.

Seen by many as a marketing gimmick, the group rode the wake created by Herb Alpert and the Tijuana Brass and Sérgio Mendes and Brasil '66 in the musically fertile mid-1960s. The albums were cross marketed successfully by A&M, with images of Baja Marimba Band albums appearing on the record sleeves of other A&M products. All three acts were the staple of A&M during this period. The content was considered "adult contemporary" or "easy listening" and consisted mainly of standards, originals and pop covers. Despite the humorous album covers, the music inside was a light and sophisticated mixture of bossa nova, jazz, and pop elements. The band performed in Maxwell House coffee commercials, during the peak of the group's popularity.

=== Decline and reunions ===
All three groups lost momentum by the end of the 1960s as the genre faded away. By the late 1960s, Alpert's Tijuana Brass had disbanded, but the Baja Marimba Band stayed together for one more album on A&M in 1971 called As Time Goes By. They had a brief reunion in 1973 with an album called The Baja Marimba Band's Back on Bell Records. During the 1970s, Julius and his wife, Cissy, collaborated on film scores and musicals.

One last reunion took place in the 1980s which lasted a couple of years and produced an album called Naturally in 1982. It featured Julius Wechter on marimba and three band alumni, Bernie Fleischer on reeds, guitarist Charlie Chiarenza and trombonist Dave Wells. New to the band were: Carmen Fanzone on horns, Jules Greenberg on 2nd marimba/percussion, Harvey Newmark on bass, and Kim Stallings on guitar. Original drummer Frank DeVito toured with the group during this time, but retired and was replaced for the recording by drummer Ed Roscetti. Still later, Julius Wechter formed a new group in the early 1990s called The Baja Marimbas with marimbaist Jules Greenberg, and they released one album, called New Deal.

After Wechter's death from lung cancer in 1999, the Baja Marimba Band disbanded.

== Select discography ==
=== Singles ===
Year	Single (A-side, B-side) Both sides from same album except where indicated	Chart positions		Album
Year	Single (A-side, B-side) Both sides from same album except where indicated	US	US AC	Album
1963	"Comin' In The Back Door" b/w "December's Child"	41	—	Baja Marimba Band
1964	"Moonglow/Picnic Theme" b/w "Acapulco 1922"	121	—	Baja Marimba Band
1964	"The Woody Woodpecker Song" b/w "Up Cherry Street" (from Baja Marimba Band)	—	—	Rides Again
1964	"Wincle Lamoyan Coan" b/w "Pedro's Porch"—Part 2 (from Baja Marimba Band)	—	—	Non-album tracks
1964	"Baja Ska" b/w "Samba De Orfeu" (from Baja Marimba Band)	—	—	Non-album tracks
1965	"Juarez" b/w "Guacamole"	—	—	Rides Again
1965	"Brasilia" b/w "Goin' Out The Side Door"	—	—	Rides Again
1965	"For Animals Only" b/w "Yellow Bird"	—	—	For Animals Only
1966	"How Much Is That Doggie In The Window" b/w "Puff (The Magic Dragon)"	—	—	For Animals Only
1966	"Yours" b/w "The Last Of The Red Hot Llamas" (from For Animals Only)	—	—	Watch Out!
1966	"The Portuguese Washerwoman" b/w "Telephone Song"	126	15	Watch Out!
1966	"Ghost Riders In The Sky" b/w "Sabor A Mi"	52	4	Watch Out!
1967	"The Cry Of The Wild Goose" b/w "Spanish Moss" (from Watch Out!)	113	21	Heads Up!
1967	"Georgy Girl" b/w "Cabeza Arriba!"	98	14	Heads Up!
1967	"Along Comes Mary" b/w "The Wall Street Rag" (Non-album track)	96	27	Fowl Play
1967	"Fowl Play" b/w "Sounds Of Silence"	—	8	Fowl Play
1968	"Sunday Mornin'" b/w "Fiddler On The Roof" (from Fowl Play)	—	—	Do You Know The Way To San Jose
1968	"Yes Sir, That's My Baby" b/w "Brasilia" (from Rides Again)	109	17	Do You Know The Way To San Jose
1968	"I Say A Little Prayer" b/w "Do You Know The Way To San Jose"	—	10	Do You Know The Way To San Jose
1968	"Flyin' High" b/w "Les Bicyclettes De Belsize"	125	15	Those Were The Days
1969	"Big Red" b/w "Peru '68"	—	—	Those Were The Days
1969	"I Don't Want To Walk Without You" b/w "I'll Marimba You"	121	21	Fresh Air
1969	"Fresh Air" b/w "Wave"	—	—	Fresh Air
1969	"Can You Dig It"—Part 1 b/w Part 2	—	40	Non-album tracks
1970	"Picasso Summer" b/w "Samba Nuevo" (from Fresh Air)	—	—	Non-album tracks
1971	"As Time Goes By" b/w "Spanish Flea"	—	—	As Time Goes By
1973	"Theme From 'Deep Throat'" b/w "Do You Want To Dance" (from Jules Wechter & The Baja Marimba Band's Back)	—	—	Non-album track
1973	"Anytime Of The Year" b/w "Taco Belle"	—	—	Jules Wechter & The Baja Marimba Band's Back

=== Studio albums ===
Year	Title	Peak chart positions		Label
Year	Title	US 200	US CB	Label
1964	Baja Marimba Band	88	92	A&M
1965	Baja Marimba Band Rides Again	127	86	A&M
1965	For Animals Only	102	55	A&M
1966	Watch Out!	54	31	A&M
1967	Heads Up!	77	40	A&M
1968	Fowl Play	168	77	A&M
1968	Do You Know The Way To San Jose	171	—	A&M
1968	Those Were The Days	117	—	A&M
1969	Fresh Air	176	—	A&M
1971	As Time Goes By	—	—	A&M
1973	The Baja Marimba Band's Back	—	—	Bell
1982	Naturally	—	—	Applause
1990	New Deal	—	—	Bay Cities

=== Compilations ===
- 1970: Greatest Hits (A&M) peaked at No. 180, during a six-week stay on the Billboard Top LPs.
- 1973: Foursider (A&M)
- 1974: A Treasury Of The Award-Winning Herb Alpert And The Tijuana Brass Plus Selections From The Baja Marimba Band (Longines Symphonette)
- 1998: Digitally Remastered Best (A&M Japan)
- 2001: The Best of The Baja Marimba Band (Collector's Choice Music)
- 2002: 36 All-Time Favorites (Timeless/Traditions Alive)
