= Volume 2 (Herb Alpert's Tijuana Brass album) =

Studio album by Herb Alpert's Tijuana Brass
- Released: December 1963
- Studio: Western (Hollywood, California)
- Genre: Easy listening, pop
- Label: A&M
- Producer: Herb Alpert, Jerry Moss

Herb Alpert's Tijuana Brass chronology
The Lonely Bull (1962)	Volume 2 (1963)	South of the Border (1964)

Volume 2 is the second album by Herb Alpert & the Tijuana Brass, known in this recording as "Herb Alpert's Tijuana Brass". It was released in 1963 on A&M Records, and sold poorly upon initial release.

== Background ==
After the Tijuana Brass became massively popular with hits from their later albums, Volume 2 was reissued in 1966 and eventually reached No. 17 on the Billboard album chart. A CD version of the album was issued by A&M Records in 1990 but is now out of print. Some LP copies of the album have a spoken introduction by Herb Alpert at the beginning of "The Great Manolete (La Virgen de la Macarena)".

It was made available digitally for download in February 2007 at the same time as the reissues of the 1969 albums Warm and The Brass Are Comin'. No CD reissue of Volume 2 was available for years, as Alpert reportedly felt that the album was of inferior technical quality. On September 9, 2016, Volume 2, along with 23 of Herb's other albums, was reissued on CD on the Herb Alpert Presents label.

As with The Lonely Bull, the album features some songs with a very Mexican flavor, but with more cover versions of pop hits than were included in that first album, "Spanish Harlem" having been a recent success for Ben E King. "Green Leaves of Summer" was the theme for the film portrayal of the famous Mexican–Texan battle in The Alamo. "Winds of Barcelona" would be reorchestrated as "El Presidente" on the Brass' next album, South of the Border. "Swinger From Seville" is a "strip-tease" tune, complete with audio of cries like "take-it-off" from a raucous audience. The song stands in contrast to the leadoff song, "La Virgen de la Macarena", the traditional title given to "Nuestra Señora de la Esperanza" (Our Lady of Hope) (or Mary, the mother of Jesus)... in Seville, Spain. The Brass' rendition of "A-me-ri-ca" begins with a bar of "Jingle Bells" as a prelude to a jazzy version of the West Side Story entry that gives no hint of that song's outspoken lyrics.

== Critical reception ==
Professional ratings
Review scores
Source	Rating
AllMusic	2/5 stars

In a retrospective review for AllMusic, music critic Richard S. Ginell wrote the album tried to duplicate the appeal of Alpert's first album. "Alpert is beginning to expand his reach beyond Baja, California without losing the ambience of 'The Lonely Bull,' sharpening his skills as a producer and exploring other moods and rhythms."

== Track listing ==
Side 1
No.	Title	Writer(s)	Length
1.	"The Great Manolete (La Virgen de la Macarena)"	Alpert	2:35
2.	"Spanish Harlem"	Jerry Leiber, Phil Spector	2:52
3.	"Swinger from Seville"	Alpert	2:30
4.	"Winds of Barcelona"	Sol Lake	2:20
5.	"Green Leaves of Summer"	Dimitri Tiomkin, Paul Francis Webster	2:30
6.	"More"	Riz Ortolani, Nino Oliviero	2:28

Side 2
No.	Title	Writer(s)	Length
1.	"America"	Leonard Bernstein, Stephen Sondheim	2:45
2.	"Surfin' Señorita"	Jerry Moss, Alpert	2:07
3.	"Marching Thru Madrid"	Sol Lake	2:30
4.	"Crea Mi Amor (Believe My Love)"	Sol Lake	2:27
5.	"Mexican Corn"	Bowman-Alpert	2:05
6.	"Milord"	Marguerite Monnot	2:17

== Charts ==
Chart (1966)	Peak position
US Billboard Top LP's	17
