= A Taste of Honey (song) =

Pop standard by Bobby Scott and Ric Marlow

- Cover of the 1965 single

Single by Herb Alpert's Tijuana Brass

from the album Whipped Cream & Other Delights
- B-side: "Third Man Theme"
- Released: August 1965
- Recorded: March 10, 1965
- Studio: A&M Studios, Hollywood, California
- Genre: Jazz; instrumental; pop; lounge
- Length: 2:43
- Label: A&M
- Songwriters: Bobby Scott, Ric Marlow
- Producers: Herb Alpert, Jerry Moss

Herb Alpert's Tijuana Brass singles chronology
"Mae" (1965)	"A Taste of Honey" (1965)	"Tijuana Taxi" (1965)

Official audio
- "A Taste of Honey" on YouTube

"A Taste of Honey" is a pop standard written by Bobby Scott and Ric Marlow. It was originally an instrumental track (or recurring theme) written for the 1960 Broadway version of the 1958 British play A Taste of Honey which was also made into the film of the same name in 1961. The original and a later recording by Herb Alpert in 1965 earned the song four Grammy Awards.

A vocal version of the song proved successful for Lenny Welch in mid-1962.

"A Taste of Honey" is in Dorian mode.

== Instrumental versions ==
The original recorded versions of the song "A Taste of Honey", "A Taste of Honey (refrain)" and "A Taste of Honey (closing theme)", appeared on Bobby Scott's 1960 album, also titled A Taste of Honey, on Atlantic 1355. The composition won Best Instrumental Theme at the Grammy Awards of 1963.

- Martin Denny, Eddie Cano and the Victor Feldman Quartet each scored minor hits in 1962 with their covers.
- Acker Bilk released a version in the UK in January 1963, reaching number 16 in the UK Singles Chart.
- Herb Alpert and the Tijuana Brass recorded the most popular instrumental version of the song with a cover on their 1965 album, Whipped Cream & Other Delights. This recording won four awards including Record of the Year at the Grammy Awards of 1966. The instrumental spent five weeks at number one on the easy listening chart, reached number seven on the Billboard Hot 100, and number 4 in Canada. This version is noted for the eight drum beats before the tempo increased, intended as an editing cue to be removed in the final version, but Alpert decided to keep it in.

== Vocal versions ==
The first vocal version of "A Taste of Honey" was recorded in 1961 by Billy Dee Williams from his album Let's Misbehave.

In addition to his original instrumental version, Bobby Scott produced and arranged a vocal version of "A Taste of Honey" for Esther Ofarim on her 1965 LP Is It Really Me?, and arranged and sang his own version on his 1970 LP Robert William Scott.

=== The Beatles ===
"A Taste of Honey"
- Cover of the 1964 Germany single

Song by the Beatles

from the album Please Please Me
- Released: March 22, 1963
- Recorded: February 11, 1963
- Studio: EMI, London
- Genre: Pop
- Length: 2:01
- Label: Parlophone
- Songwriter: Bobby Scott/Ric Marlow
- Producer: George Martin

The Beatles performed Lenny Welch's adaptation as part of their repertoire in 1962, slightly changing the lyrics in the chorus. Because the instrumental version by Acker Bilk was popular in the United Kingdom at the time, the song was chosen to be recorded for their 1963 debut album, Please Please Me. A version from that time was released in 1977 on the album Live! at the Star-Club in Hamburg, Germany; 1962.

In the US, this song first appeared on the Vee-Jay Records album Introducing... The Beatles. They also performed "A Taste of Honey" seven times for BBC radio shows, including Here We Go, Side by Side, and Easy Beat. In 1967, McCartney was inspired to compose “Your Mother Should Know” based on a line taken from the screenplay.

==== Personnel ====
- Paul McCartney – double-tracked lead vocals, bass
- John Lennon – acoustic guitar, backing vocals
- George Harrison – lead guitar, backing vocals
- Ringo Starr – brushed drums

Engineered by Norman Smith

=== Barbra Streisand ===
Barbra Streisand recorded the song for her debut record The Barbra Streisand Album, produced by Mike Berniker in 1963.

=== The Supremes & Four Tops ===
"A Taste of Honey"
- One of sleeve variants of the 1971 Dutch single

Song by The Supremes & Four Tops

from the album The Magnificent 7
- Released: 1971
- Genre: R&B, soul
- Length: 2:57
- Label: Tamla Motown
- Songwriter: Bobby Scott/Ric Marlow
- Producers: Clay McMurray, Duke Browner

==== Personnel ====
The Supremes

- Jean Terrell – lead vocals
- Mary Wilson – vocals
- Cindy Birdsong – vocals

The Four Tops

- Levi Stubbs – lead vocals
- Abdul "Duke" Fakir – vocals
- Lawrence Payton – vocals
- Renaldo "Obie" Benson – vocals

=== The Supremes & Four Tops version ===
Chart (1971)	Peak position
Netherlands (Dutch Top 40 Tipparade)	7

=== Other artists ===
- In 1962, producer Quincy Jones recorded "A Taste of Honey" for his album "Big Band Bossa Nova". This version was featured later on CD releases.
- In 1964 jazz singer Morgana King released a version which became her signature song.
- Paul Desmond's cover of the song served as track #4 on his 1964 album Glad to be Unhappy.
- Tony Bennett reached #94 in the US with a vocal version for his album The Many Moods of Tony in 1964. His version of "A Taste of Honey" was recorded on September 11, 1963, accompanied by the Ralph Sharon Trio, and arranged by Dick Hyman.
- Bobby Darin recorded a version of the song for his 1965 album Venice Blue.
- The Artwoods recorded a version for their 1966 EP Jazz in Jeans with Jon Lord on the Hammond organ and Derek Griffiths on the lead guitar.
- Allan Sherman recorded the tune with parody lyrics as "A Waste Of Money" on his 1966 album, Allan Sherman Live!!! (Hoping You Are The Same.)
- The Hassles, a band featuring a young Billy Joel, recorded a version for their self titled 1967 album.
- The Temptations recorded the song on their 1967 album, The Temptations in a Mellow Mood
- In 2017, The Shins recorded a version of the song for the soundtrack album Resistance Radio: The Man In The High Castle Album.

== See also ==
- List of number-one adult contemporary singles of 1965 (U.S.)
- List of songs covered by the Beatles
