= Spanish Flea =

Single by Herb Alpert & the Tijuana Brass

from the album Going Places
- A-side: "What Now My Love"
- Released: 1966
- Recorded: 1965
- Studio: Gold Star Studios, Hollywood
- Genre: Pop, Jazz
- Length: 2:07
- Label: A&M
- Songwriter: Julius Wechter
- Producers: Herb Alpert; Jerry Moss

Herb Alpert & the Tijuana Brass singles chronology
"Tijuana Taxi" (1965)	"What Now My Love" / "Spanish Flea" (1966)	"The Work Song" (1966)

Official audio
- "Spanish Flea" on YouTube

Audio sample
- Spanish Flea: file; help

"Spanish Flea" is a popular song written by Julius Wechter in the 1960s with lyrics by his wife Cissy Wechter. The original version was recorded by Herb Alpert and the Tijuana Brass in 1965. Cover versions of the song have been recorded by dozens of artists worldwide.

== Composition and recording ==
Julius Wechter was a percussionist in Herb Alpert and the Tijuana Brass, most notably on marimba. "Spanish Flea" was one of several songs he wrote for the group. It was released as an instrumental on the B-side to the single "What Now My Love" from their 1965 album Going Places. The album was a No. 1 hit in the U.S., and the single peaked at No. 27 on the Billboard Hot 100. "Spanish Flea" featured Alpert's trumpet over a Latin rhythm backing.

The original version was recorded on August 13, 1965 at Gold Star Studios in Hollywood, Los Angeles, California. Two other songs were recorded during that session, those being "And I Love Her" and "More And More Amor" In the United States, the song is closely associated with the long-running game show The Dating Game, for which it was played when the bachelor entered into the stage to ask questions to learn and choose which bachelorette had best suited the needs of that bachelor.

== Chart history ==
Chart (1966)	Peak position
Argentina	9
Australia (Kent Music Report)	28
Canada RPM Adult Contemporary	6
Canada RPM Top Singles	6
UK Singles (Official Charts)	3
U.S. Billboard Hot 100	27
U.S. Billboard Adult Contemporary	4
U.S. Cash Box Top 100	21

== Other recordings ==
Teresa Brewer, The Modernaires, Frankie Randall, and Soupy Sales were among the artists who quickly recorded vocal versions of "Spanish Flea" with Cissy Wechter's original lyrics.

The song was also recorded by Sergio Mendes & Brasil '66 on their 1966 debut album, Herb Alpert Presents Sergio Mendes & Brasil 66.

"Spanish Flea" was also covered by Trudy Pitts on her debut album Introducing the Fabulous Trudy Pitts (1967), by the Doodletown Pipers on The Doodletown Pipers Sing-along '67 (1967) and by Jean-Jacques Perrey and Gershon Kingsley on Kaleidoscopic Vibrations: Spotlight on the Moog, also recorded in 1967. Julius Wechter himself, with his Baja Marimba Band, recorded the song on the 1971 album As Time Goes By.

Marcel Stellman wrote a different set of lyrics for "Spanish Flea". Kathy Kirby used them in her 1966 recording of the song.

The Glenn Miller Orchestra included the song as the last track on their album Something New: The Glenn Miller Orchestra plays the Tijuana Brass (1966).

Mel Blanc parodied the song as "The Flea" on the Jack Benny variety show in December 1966, during a "Si-Sy-Sue" skit along with his group 'The Tijuana Strings'.

Allan Sherman also parodied the song on his album Togetherness (1967). Another parodic cover version, spoofing Alpert's version, appeared on the mock Alpert tribute album Sour Cream & Other Delights by the Frivolous Five.

== In popular culture ==
=== In film and television ===
"Spanish Flea" has been used in a variety of film and television soundtracks. It was one of two Alpert songs in a 1966 animated cartoon by John Hubley, A Herb Alpert and the Tijuana Brass Double Feature.

The song was used by Mazda in TV commercials during the 1970's to advertise their GLC model, "Its a great little car"

The tune has been featured in four episodes of The Simpsons: "The Otto Show" (with Homer singing the original lyrics), "Team Homer", "Natural Born Kissers", and "Sunday, Cruddy Sunday".

In the fingerprint scene in Rosewood's home in Beverly Hills Cop II, Eddie Murphy (playing Axel Foley) and Judge Reinhold (playing Billy Rosewood) improvised the idea of humming the tune. When Taggart (John Ashton) asks what the tune is, Rosewood replies, "The Dating Game!".

In the 1996 film Striptease, the song is played inside a laundromat while Erin Grant (Demi Moore) and her daughter Angela (Rumer Willis) take all the clothes out of the dryer machine.

In the 1997 film Perdita Durango, the two main characters happily groove to the song while abducting two teenagers.

Its melody is possibly referenced in the 1998 Kare Kano anime TV series soundtrack Act 1.0 song: 14 - "Miyazawa Ikka".

In an episode of The Smell of Reeves and Mortimer, Vic Reeves plays the song through a prosthetic arm.

In the Philippine Noontime show It's Showtime on ABS-CBN, this song was constantly played for taking a picture of a person's face with a frame called "Face Dance". Soon after the "Face Dance" game became a regular staple on the network's out-of town shows.

In American Pie 2, the band camp counselor plays the song on his trumpet, not knowing that the trumpet had just been inserted into Jason Biggs' character's anus.

In the 2000 film The Dish, it plays at 12:03 before showing a ball preparation at the town hall.

In the 2001 film ‘’Ocean’s Eleven’’, the song plays as ambient background music while Bernie Mac negotiates the purchase a van from a used car dealership.

The Nickelodeon TV series The Fairly OddParents uses the song in many episodes such as episode 4b season 1 “Apartnership”.

In an episode of Supernatural, the song is played when a pair of demons call Crowley (the King of Hell) from a hunter's trap.

In the 2013 film White House Down, the ringtone can be heard repetitively in the film on the character of Richard Jenkins' mobile cell phone.

The song has been heard on The Weather Channel's Local on the 8s time by time between 1999 and 2013.

In the 2019 film Joker, the song plays with the Indian-head test pattern when the broadcast of Live with Murray Franklin gets cut off after the Joker shoots Franklin. In the DVD credits, the song is credited to Ray Davies and His Button Down Brass.

In the 2023 HBO miniseries Love & Death in the episode "Encounters", it was performed by the character Pat on his trumpet at the dinner table.

=== In podcasts ===
"Spanish Flea" acts as the opening and closing music to the Fangraphs audio podcast. The song is also used as the closing music for the soccer podcast Low Limit Futbol, hosted by Joe Uccello and Roberto Rojas. It is used as background music for the ad-reads on the 'We Hate Movies' podcast. It is also used as the closing theme for Chris & Andi Porter's 'One Millionth Podcast', although it is sung by the siblings themselves - a different way every time. It also appears in the jingle that precedes the ‘Three by Three’ segment by John C. Dvorak during the “No Agenda” podcast.
