= Herb Alpert =

American musician (born 1935)

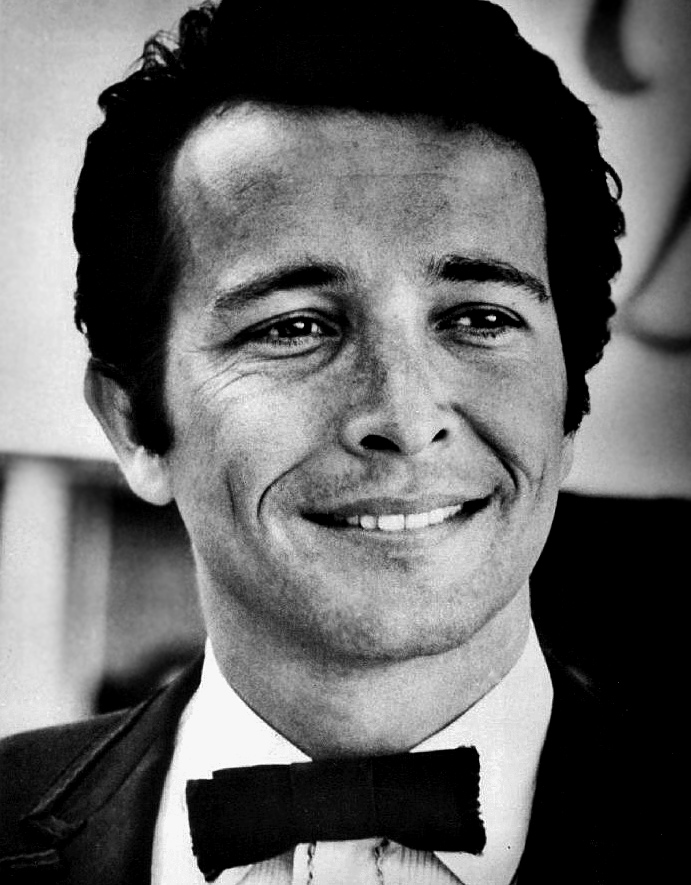
- Alpert in 1966

Background information
- Also known as: Dore Alpert, Tito Alpert
- Born: Herbert Alpert; March 31, 1935 (age 91); Los Angeles, California, U.S.
- Genres: Jazz; latin; funk; pop; R&B
- Occupations: Musician; songwriter; record producer; arranger; conductor; painter; sculptor; theatre producer
- Instruments: Trumpet; piano; vocals
- Years active: 1956–present
- Labels: A&M; Verve; Almo Sounds; Shout! Factory; Herb Alpert Presents
- Website: herbalpert.com

Herbert Alpert (born March 31, 1935) is an American musician who led the band Herb Alpert & the Tijuana Brass (sometimes called Herb Alpert and the TJB or Herb Alpert’s Tijuana Brass) in the 1960s. During the same decade, he co-founded A&M Records with Jerry Moss.

Alpert has recorded 28 albums that have appeared on the U.S. Billboard 200 chart, five of which reached No. 1; he has been awarded 14 platinum albums and 15 gold albums. Alpert is the only musician to have reached number one on the U.S. Billboard Hot 100 as both a vocalist ("This Guy's in Love with You", 1968) and an instrumentalist ("Rise", 1979). (Note: Barry White is often incorrectly listed as another artist with both a vocal and an instrumental Billboard number one, but he did not perform an instrument on "Love's Theme".)

Alpert has sold an estimated 72 million records worldwide. His awards have included a Tony Award and eight Grammy Awards, as well as the Grammy Lifetime Achievement Award. In 2006, he was inducted into the Rock and Roll Hall of Fame. Alpert was awarded the National Medal of Arts by Barack Obama in 2012.

== Early life and career ==
Herbert Alpert was born on March 31, 1935, and raised in Boyle Heights, an Eastside neighborhood of Los Angeles. He was the youngest of three children (a daughter and two sons) born to Tillie (née Goldberg) and Louis Leib (or Louis Bentsion-Leib) Alpert. His parents were Jewish immigrants to the U.S. from Radomyshl in present-day Ukraine and Romania.

Alpert was born into a family of musicians. His father, although a tailor by trade, was also a mandolin player. His mother taught violin at a young age, and his older brother, David, was a drummer. His sister Mimi, who was the oldest, played the piano. Alpert began to play trumpet at eight years old.

Alpert started attending Fairfax High School beginning in 10th grade. In 11th grade (1952), he was a member of their gymnastics team. One of his specialties was performing on the rings, but an appendectomy a week before a league meet sidelined him. In his senior year (1953), he began focusing on his trumpet.

While attending the University of Southern California in the 1950s, he was a member of the USC Trojan Marching Band for two years. Alpert served in the U.S. Army during the Korean War, and played in the 6th Army Band. In 1956, he appeared in an uncredited role as "Drummer on Mt. Sinai" in The Ten Commandments.

In 1957, Alpert teamed up with Lou Adler, another burgeoning lyricist, as a songwriter for Keen Records. A number of songs written or co-written by Alpert during the following two years became top-20 hits, including "Baby Talk" by Jan and Dean and "Wonderful World" by Sam Cooke. In 1960, he began his recording career as a vocalist at RCA Records under the name of Dore Alpert.

In 1962, Alpert and his new business partner Jerry Moss formed Carnival Records with "Tell It to the Birds" as its first release, distribution outside of Los Angeles being done by Dot Records. After Carnival released its second single "Love Is Back in Style" by Charlie Robinson, Alpert and Moss found prior use of the Carnival name, so renamed their label A&M Records.

== The Tijuana Brass years ==
All artists should be looking for their own voices. I went through a period of trying to sound like Harry James and Louis Armstrong and Miles [Davis]. And then when Clifford Brown came along, it was almost discouraging. The guy was so good! But I kept at it. I loved playing. And then when I heard Les Paul multitrack his guitar on recordings, I tried that with the trumpet. Boom—that sound came out. After I released 'The Lonely Bull', the record that started A&M in 1962, a lady in Germany wrote a letter to me. She said, 'Thank you, Mr. Alpert, for sending me on a vicarious trip to Tijuana.' I realized that music was visual for her, that it took her someplace. I said, 'That's the type of music I want to make. I want to make music that transports people.' — Herb Alpert in Off Beat Magazine, April 24, 2017

The song that jump-started Alpert's performing career was originally titled "Twinkle Star", written by Sol Lake (who was to write many Tijuana Brass songs over the next decade). Alpert was dissatisfied with his first efforts to record the song, then took a break to visit a bullfight in Tijuana, Mexico. As Alpert later recounted, "That's when it hit me! Something in the excitement of the crowd, the traditional mariachi music, the trumpet call heralding the start of the fight, the yelling, the snorting of the bulls, it all clicked." Alpert adapted the tune to the trumpet style, mixed in crowd cheers and other noises for ambience, and renamed the song "The Lonely Bull".

He personally funded the production of the record as a single, and it spread through radio DJs until it caught on and became a top-10 hit in the fall of 1962. He followed up quickly with his debut album, The Lonely Bull by "Herb Alpert & the Tijuana Brass". Originally, the Tijuana Brass was just Alpert overdubbing his own trumpet, slightly out of sync.

It was A&M's first album (with the original release number being 101), although it was recorded for Conway Records. The title cut reached number six on the Billboard pop chart. For this album and subsequent releases, Alpert recorded with the group of Los Angeles session musicians known as the Wrecking Crew, whom he holds in high regard.

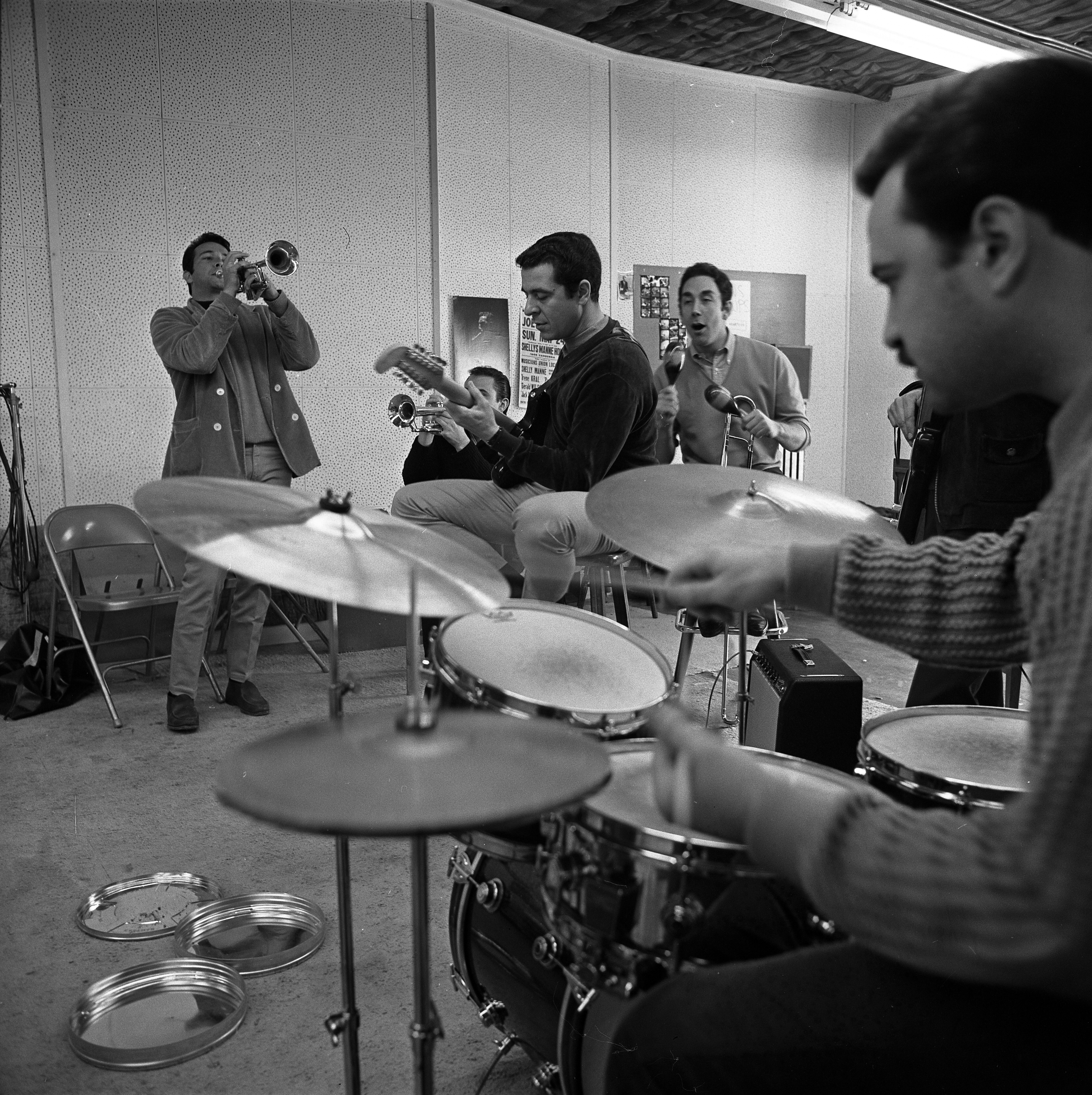
The Tijuana Brass in 1966; from left: Alpert, Tonni Kalash, John Pisano, Nick Ceroli and Pat Senatore

Alpert's 1965 album Whipped Cream & Other Delights proved so popular — it was the number-one album of 1966, outselling The Beatles, Frank Sinatra, and the Rolling Stones — that Alpert had to turn the Tijuana Brass into an actual touring ensemble rather than a studio band. Some of that popularity might be attributable to the album's notoriously racy cover, which featured model Dolores Erickson seemingly clothed only in whipped cream. In a chat with the audience during his concert in Milwaukee on 6 October 2025, Mr. Alpert confirmed "it was shaving cream, not whipped cream".

As writer Bruce Handy wrote in a Billboard article, though, two other Tijuana Brass albums, Going Places (1965) and What Now My Love (1966), "held the third and fifth spots on the 1966 year-end chart despite pleasant yet far more anodyne covers." Another measure of the band's popularity is that a number of Tijuana Brass songs were used as theme music for years by the ABC TV game show The Dating Game.

In 1966, a short animated film by John and Faith Hubley called "A Herb Alpert and the Tijuana Brass Double Feature" was released; it won the Academy Award for Best Animated Short Film in 1967. The film featured two songs by the band, "Tijuana Taxi" and "Spanish Flea". Also in 1967, the Tijuana Brass performed Burt Bacharach's title cut to the first movie version of Casino Royale.

Alpert's only number-one single during this period, and the first number-one hit for his A&M label, was a solo effort: "This Guy's in Love with You", written by Burt Bacharach and Hal David, featuring a rare vocal. Alpert sang it to his first wife in a 1968 CBS Television special titled Beat of the Brass. The sequence was filmed on the beach in Malibu. The song was not intended to be released, but after it was used in the television special, allegedly thousands of telephone calls to CBS asking about it convinced Alpert to release it as a single, two days after the show aired. Although Alpert's vocal skills and range were limited, the song's technical demands suited him.

After years of success, Alpert had a personal crisis in 1969, declaring "the trumpet is my enemy." He disbanded the Tijuana Brass, and stopped performing in public. Eventually, he sought out teacher Carmine Caruso, "who never played trumpet a day in his life, (but) he was a great trumpet teacher." "What I found," Alpert told The New York Times, "is that the thing in my hands is just a piece of plumbing. The real instrument is me, the emotions, not my lip, not my technique, but feelings I learned to stuff away—as a kid who came from a very unvocal household. Since then, I've been continually working it out, practicing religiously and now, playing better than ever." The results were noticeable; as Richard S. Ginell wrote in an AllMusic review of Alpert's comeback album, You Smile - The Song Begins, "His four-year sabbatical over, Herb Alpert returned to the studio creatively refreshed, his trumpet sounding more soulful and thoughtful, his ears attuned more than ever to jazz."

== Post-Brass musical career and "Rise" ==
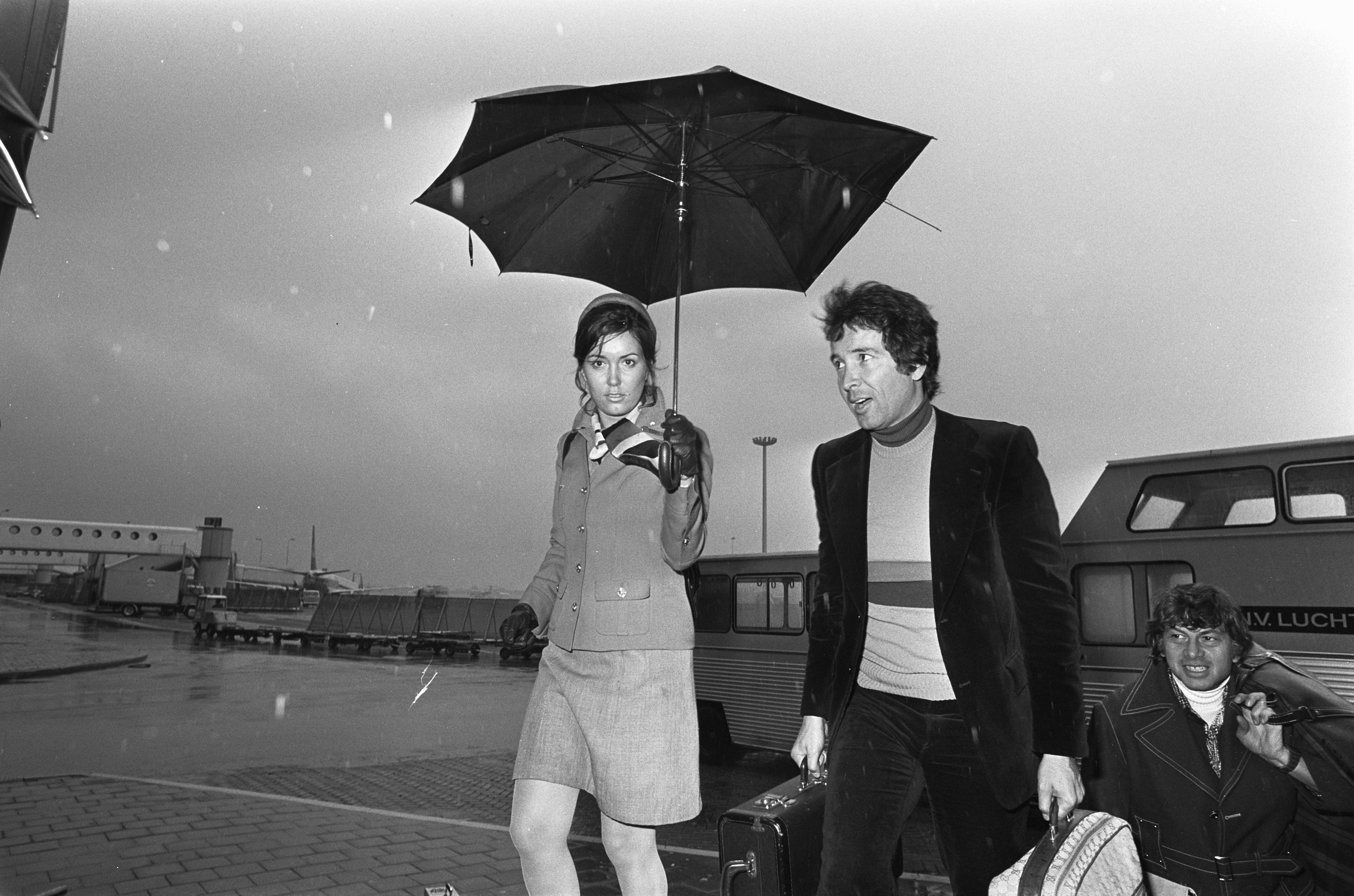
Herb Alpert at Schiphol Airport, 1974

In 1979, five years after his last chart hit with the Tijuana Brass, Alpert attempted a disco album of rearranged Tijuana Brass hits. "It just sounded awful to me," Alpert was quoted later. "I didn't want any part of it." Because the musicians were already booked, though, Alpert recorded other material, including the instrumental "Rise", with the initial version created by Alpert's nephew, Randy "Badazz" Alpert and his close friend, musician Andy Armer.

The song reached number one on the Billboard Hot 100 after it was used repeatedly on the soap opera General Hospital. The song also became a hit in the UK, but in a speeded-up version, due to British DJs not realizing that the American twelve-inch single was recorded at 33 rpm instead of 45 rpm. Its bass line was later in The Notorious B.I.G.’s “Hypnotize”, which itself reached number one on the Hot 100.

Over the next two decades, Alpert released an album nearly every year. He has released more than a dozen records since 2006.

In 2013, Alpert released Steppin' Out, which won a Grammy for Best Pop Instrumental Album. Since that time, he has released several other albums, most recently 50 (claimed to be his 50th studio album) and his third Christmas album, titled Christmas Time Is Here and has said he has plans for his next LP in mind.

== Tijuana Brass Revival ==
In late 2024, Alpert formed a new Tijuana Brass group, which went on tour in 2025, to celebrate the landmark Whipped Cream and Other Delights album. The tour is titled "Herb Alpert and the Tijuana Brass and Other Delights." According to Herb Alpert's website, the tour is scheduled to move to the United Kingdom for six concerts in 2027, with no end date being announced as yet. The band members (besides Alpert) are: Ray Brinker (drums), Kris Bergh (trumpet, percussion), Hussain Jiffry (bass), Bill Cantos (keyboards, marimba, percussion, vocals), Ryan Dragon (trombone, percussion), and Kerry Marx (guitar).

Lani Hall joined the group for the first year of the tour, performing a medley of songs she recorded with Sergio Mendes. According to posts by "Herb's Social Media Team" on his official Facebook page, the group has had 64 sold-out concerts as of September 15, 2026.

== A&M Records ==
On October 11, 1989, Philips subsidiary PolyGram announced its acquisition of A&M Records for $500 million. Alpert and co-owner/business partner Jerry Moss later received an extra $200 million payment for PolyGram's breach of the terms of the deal.

== Visual arts ==
Alpert has a second career as an abstract expressionist painter and sculptor, with group and solo exhibitions around the United States and Europe. The 2010 sculpture exhibition "Herb Alpert: Black Totems" in Beverly Hills brought media attention to his visual work. His 2013 exhibition in Santa Monica included both abstract paintings and large totem-like sculptures.

== Awards and honors ==
In May 2000, Alpert was awarded an honorary doctorate from Berklee College of Music.

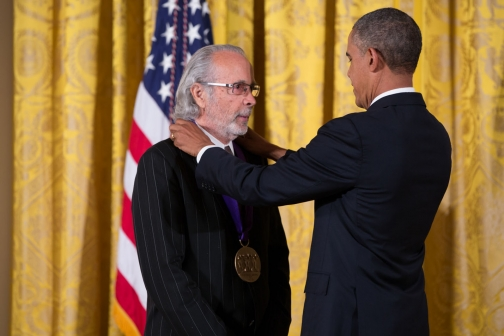
Alpert being awarded the National Medal of Arts by President Obama in 2013

In 1977, for his contribution to the recording industry, Alpert was awarded a star on the Hollywood Walk of Fame at 6929 Hollywood Boulevard.

At the 1997 Billboard Latin Music Awards Alpert received the El Premio Billboard award for his contributions to Latin music.

In March 2006, Alpert and Moss were inducted into the Rock and Roll Hall of Fame, as nonperformer lifetime achievers for their work at A&M.

Alpert was awarded the Society of Singers Lifetime Achievement Award by Society of Singers in 2009.

Alpert was awarded a 2012 National Medal of Arts award by Barack and Michelle Obama on July 2013, in the White House's East Room.

== Philanthropy ==
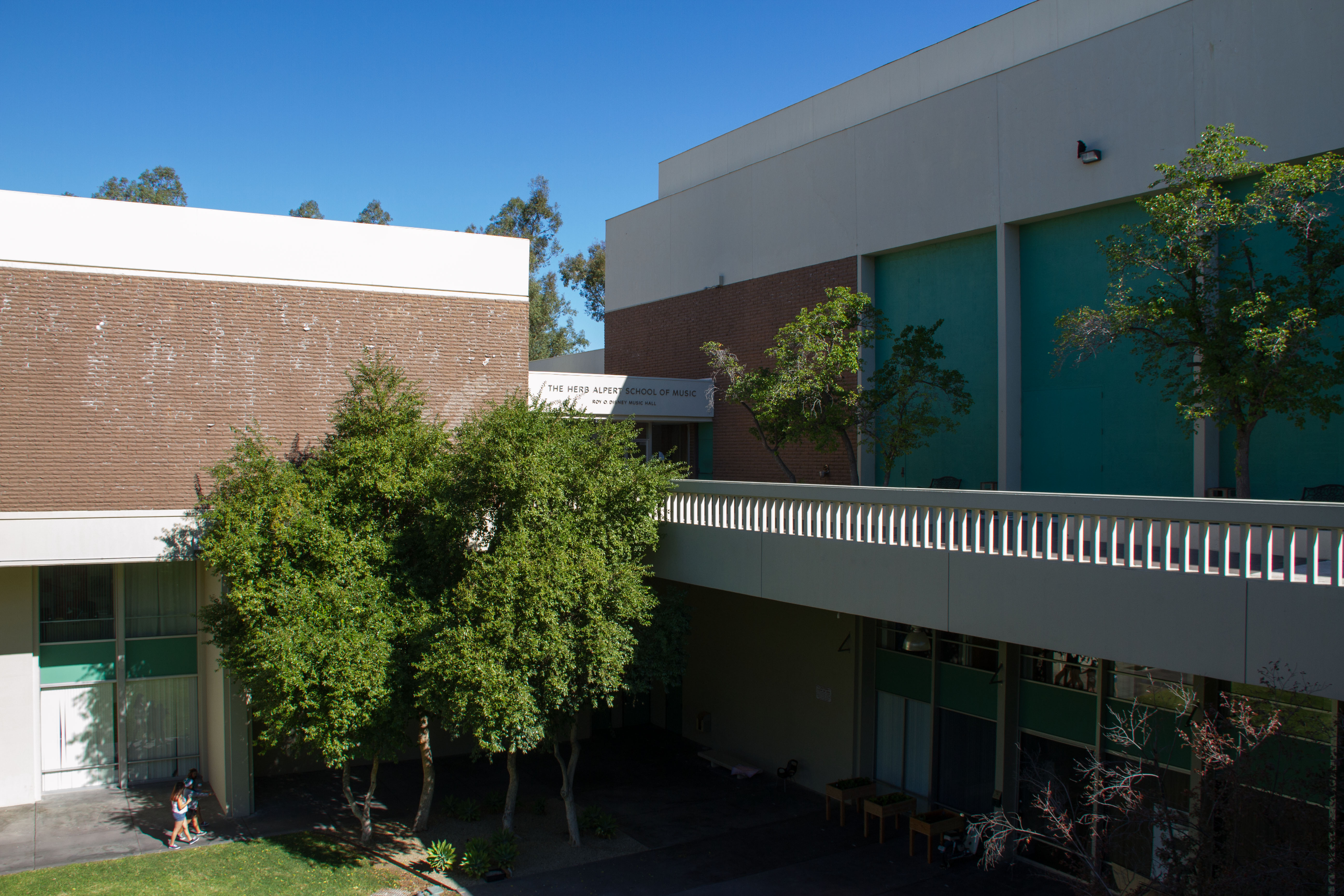
The Herb Alpert School of Music at CalArts

In the 1980s Alpert created the Herb Alpert Foundation and the Alpert Awards in the Arts with the California Institute of the Arts (CalArts).

The foundation supports youth and arts education, as well as environmental issues, and helps fund the PBS series Bill Moyers on Faith and Reason and later Moyers & Company.

Alpert and his wife donated $30 million to University of California, Los Angeles (UCLA) in 2007 to form and endow the UCLA Herb Alpert School of Music as part of the restructured UCLA School of the Arts and Architecture. He donated $24 million, including $15 million from April 2008, to CalArts for its music curricula, and provided funding for the culture-jamming activists the Yes Men.

In 2012, the foundation granted more than $5 million to the Harlem School of the Arts, which allowed the school to retire its debt, restore its endowment, and create a scholarship program for needy students. In 2013, the school's building was renamed the Herb Alpert Center. In 2016, Alpert's foundation also bestowed a $10.1 million donation to Los Angeles City College to provide music majors with a tuition-free education, the largest gift to an individual community college in the history of Southern California, and the second-largest gift in the history of the state. In 2020, Alpert bestowed an additional $9.7 million on the Harlem School of the Arts to upgrade its facility.

Alpert founded the Louis and Tillie Alpert Music Center in Jerusalem, which brings together both Arab and Jewish students.

== Business ventures ==
In the late 1980s, Alpert started H. Alpert and Co., a short-lived perfume company, which sold products in high-end department stores such as Nordstrom. The company launched with two scents, Listen and Listen for Men. Alpert compared perfume to music, with high and low notes.

In 2004, in partnership with his daughter Eden, Alpert opened Vibrato, a jazz club and restaurant located in the Bel Air neighborhood of Los Angeles.

As of 2025, Alpert's net worth is estimated at $850 million, largely due to his music career and the sale of A&M Records to Interscope Records.

== Documentaries ==
In September 2010, the TV documentary Legends: Herb Alpert – Tijuana Brass and Other Delights premiered on BBC4.

In 2020, Herb Alpert Is..., a documentary written and directed by John Scheinfeld, was released.

== Personal life ==
Alpert married Sharon Mae Lubin at the Presidio of San Francisco in 1956. They had two children, Dore (born 1960) and Eden (born 1966). The couple divorced in 1971. In 1974, Alpert married Lani Hall, once the lead singer of A&M group Brasil '66. Alpert and Hall have a daughter, actress Aria Alpert, born in 1976.

Hall and Alpert recorded a live album, Anything Goes, in 2009; a studio album, I Feel You, in 2011; and another studio album, Steppin' Out, in 2013. An AllMusic review concluded: "Ultimately, Steppin' Out represents not just the third album in a trilogy, but a loving creative partnership that, for Alpert and Hall, spans a lifetime." Hall has continued to make occasional appearances on Alpert's albums.

== Discography ==
=== Studio albums ===
List of studio albums, with selected peak chart positions and certifications
Title	Year	Peak chart positions					Certifications
Title	Year	US	US Jazz	GER	NOR	UK	Certifications
The Lonely Bull	1962	10	—	—	—	—	US: Gold
Volume 2	1963	17	—	—	—	—	US: Gold
South of the Border	1964	6	—	—	—	—	US: Gold
Whipped Cream & Other Delights	1965	1	—	—	10	21	US: Gold
Going Places	1965	1	—	28	5	4	US: Gold
What Now My Love	1966	1	—	11	20	18	US: Gold
S.R.O.	1966	2	—	3	17	5	US: Gold
Sounds Like...	1967	1	—	34	13	21	US: Gold
Herb Alpert's Ninth	1967	4	—	9	7	26	US: Gold
The Beat of the Brass	1968	1	—	23	8	4	US: Gold
Christmas Album	1968	—	—	—	—	—	US: Gold
Warm	1969	28	—	—	14	30	US: Gold
The Brass Are Comin'	1969	30	—	39	—	40	
Summertime	1971	111	—	—	—	—	
You Smile – The Song Begins	1974	66	—	—	—	—	
Coney Island	1975	88	—	—	—	—	
Just You and Me	1976	—	—	—	—	—	
Herb Alpert / Hugh Masekela	1978	65	—	—	—	—	
Rise	1979	6	—	—	21	37	US: Platinum; UK: Silver
Beyond	1980	28	—	—	—	—	
Magic Man	1981	61	—	—	—	—	
Fandango	1982	100	—	—	—	—	
Blow Your Own Horn	1983	120	—	—	—	—	
Bullish	1984	75	—	—	—	—	
Wild Romance	1985	151	—	—	—	—	
Keep Your Eye on Me	1987	18	—	55	—	79	US: Gold
Under a Spanish Moon	1988	—	—	—	—	—	
My Abstract Heart	1989	—	—	—	—	—	
North on South St.	1991	—	—	—	—	—	
Midnight Sun	1992	—	—	—	—	—	
Second Wind	1996	—	7	—	—	—	
Passion Dance	1997	—	8	—	—	—	
Colors	1999	—	43	—	—	—	
Whipped Cream & Other Delights ReWhipped	2006	—	2	—	—	—	
I Feel You (with Lani Hall)	2011	—	5	—	—	—	
Steppin' Out (with Lani Hall)	2013	—	11	—	—	—	
In the Mood	2014	172	3	—	—	—	
Come Fly with Me	2015	—	7	—	—	—	
Human Nature	2016	—	10	—	—	—	
Music Volume 1	2017	—	3	—	—	—	
The Christmas Wish	2017	—	2	—	—	—	
Music Volume 3: Herb Alpert Reimagines the Tijuana Brass	2018	—	6	—	—	—	
Over the Rainbow	2019	—	1	—	—	—	
Catch the Wind	2021	—	—	—	—	—	
Sunny Side of the Street	2022						
Wish Upon a Star	2023	—	—	—	—	—	
50	2024	—	17	—	—	—	

=== Compilations ===
List of compilations, with selected peak chart positions and certifications
Title	Year	Peak chart positions				Certifications
Title	Year	US	US Jazz	NOR	UK	Certifications
Greatest Hits	1970	43	—	—	8	US: Gold
Solid Brass	1972	135	—	—	—	—
Herb Alpert & Friends Box Set	1973	—	—	—	—	UK: Silver
40 Greatest	1977	—	—	—	45	—
Classics Volume 1	1986	—	—	—	—	—
Classics Volume 20	1986	---	-	-	-	-
The Very Best Of Herb Alpert	1991	—	—	—	34	—
Definitive Hits	2001	—	7	12	—	—
Herb Alpert Is...	2020	-	-	-	-	-

=== Singles ===
List of singles, with selected peak chart positions
Title	Year	Peak chart positions										Album
Title	Year	US	US AC	US R&B	AUS	BEL (Fl)	BEL (Wa)	GER	NL	NZ	UK	Album
"The Trial" (As Herb B. Lou and The Legal Eagles, with Lou Adler)	1958	—	—	—	—	—	—	—	—	—	—	Non-album singles
"Sweet Georgia Brown" b/w "Viper's Blues" (As Herbie Alpert and his Quartet)	1959	—	—	—	—	—	—	—	—	—	—	Non-album singles
"The Hully Gully" b/w "Kiss Me" (As Herbie Alpert)	1959	—	—	—	—	—	—	—	—	—	—	Non-album singles
"Finders Keepers" (As Herbie Alpert)	1960	—	—	—	—	—	—	—	—	—	—	Non-album singles
"Gonna Get a Girl" (As Dore Alpert)	1961	—	—	—	—	—	—	—	—	—	—	Non-album singles
"Little Lost Lover" (As Dore Alpert)	1962	—	—	—	—	—	—	—	—	—	—	Non-album singles
"Tell It to the Birds" b/w "Fallout Shelter" (As Dore Alpert)	1962	—	—	—	—	—	—	—	—	—	—	
"The Lonely Bull"	1962	6	—	—	1	—	—	—	—	—	—	The Lonely Bull
"Struttin' with Maria"	1963	—	—	—	—	—	—	—	—	—	—	The Lonely Bull
"Dina" (As Dore Alpert)	1963	—	—	—	—	—	—	—	—	—	—	Non-album single
"Marching Thru Madrid"	1963	96	—	—	42	—	—	—	—	—	—	Volume 2
"Mexican Corn"	1963	—	—	—	—	—	—	—	—	—	—	Volume 2
"America"	1963	—	—	—	25	—	—	—	—	—	—	Volume 2
"I'd Do It All Again" (As Dore Alpert)	1964	—	—	—	—	—	—	—	—	—	—	Non-album singles
"Mexican Drummer Man"	1964	77	19	—	—	—	—	—	—	—	—	Non-album singles
"The Mexican Shuffle"	1964	85	19	—	36	—	—	—	—	—	—	South of the Border
"El Presidente"	1964	—	—	—	—	—	—	—	—	—	—	South of the Border
"South of the Border"	1964	—	—	—	—	—	—	—	—	—	—	South of the Border
"Whipped Cream"	1965	68	13	—	99	—	—	—	—	—	—	Whipped Cream & Other Delights
"Peanuts"	1965	—	—	—	81	—	—	—	—	—	—	Whipped Cream & Other Delights
"A Taste of Honey"	1965	7	1	—	79	11	14	29	18	—	—	Whipped Cream & Other Delights
"Mae"	1965	—	26	—	—	—	—	—	—	—	—	Going Places
"3rd Man Theme"	1965	47	7	—	90	—	—	—	—	—	—	Going Places
"Zorba the Greek"	1965	11	2	—	32	—	—	—	—	—	—	Going Places
"Tijuana Taxi"	1965	38	9	—	32	—	—	—	—	—	37	Going Places
"Spanish Flea"	1966	27	4	—	28	19	—	26	—	—	3	Going Places
"What Now My Love"	1966	24	2	—	28	—	—	—	—	—	—	What Now My Love
"The Work Song"	1966	18	2	—	25	—	—	—	—	—	—	S.R.O.
"Flamingo"	1966	28	5	—	30	16	23	—	—	—	—	S.R.O.
"Mame"	1966	19	2	—	51	—	—	—	—	—	—	S.R.O.
"Wade in the Water"	1967	37	5	—	—	—	—	—	—	—	—	Sounds Like...
"Casino Royale"	1967	27	1	—	14	—	—	—	—	—	27	Sounds Like...
"The Happening"	1967	32	4	—	51	—	—	—	—	—	—	Herb Alpert's Ninth
"A Banda (Ah Bahn-da)"	1967	35	1	—	33	—	—	22	—	—	—	Herb Alpert's Ninth
"Carmen"	1968	51	3	—	40	—	—	—	—	—	—	Herb Alpert's Ninth
"Cabaret"	1968	72	13	—	99	—	—	—	—	—	—	The Beat of the Brass
"Slick"	1968	119	36	—	—	—	—	—	—	—	—	The Beat of the Brass
"This Guy's in Love with You"	1968	1	1	—	1	—	18	37	13	—	3	The Beat of the Brass
"My Favorite Things"	1968	45	7	—	—	—	—	—	—	—	—	Christmas Album
"To Wait for Love"	1968	51	2	—	44	—	—	—	—	—	—	Warm
"Zazueira"	1969	78	9	—	79	—	—	—	—	—	—	Warm
"Without Her"	1969	63	5	—	75	—	—	—	—	—	36	Warm
"Ob La Di Ob La Da"	1969	—	—	—	—	—	—	—	—	—	—	Warm
"Marjorine"	1969	—	—	—	—	—	—	—	—	—	—	Warm
"You Are My Life"	1969	—	34	—	—	—	—	—	—	—	—	The Brass Are Comin'
"The Maltese Melody"	1970	—	14	—	—	—	—	—	—	—	—	The Brass Are Comin'
"Jerusalem"	1970	74	6	—	—	—	—	43	—	—	42	Summertime
"Summertime"	1971	—	28	—	—	—	—	—	—	—	—	Summertime
"Darlin'"	1971	—	—	—	—	—	—	—	—	—	—	Summertime
"Without Her"	1972	—	—	—	—	—	—	—	—	—	—	Solid Brass
"Last Tango in Paris"	1973	77	22	—	—	—	—	—	—	—	—	You Smile – The Song Begins
"Fox Hunt"	1974	84	14	—	—	—	—	—	—	—	—	You Smile – The Song Begins
"Save the Sunlight"	1974	—	13	—	—	—	—	—	—	—	—	You Smile – The Song Begins
"I Belong"	1974	—	—	—	—	—	—	—	—	—	—	Coney Island
"Coney Island"	1975	—	19	—	—	—	—	—	—	—	—	Coney Island
"El Bimbo"	1975	—	28	—	—	—	—	—	—	—	—	Non-album singles
"Whistle Song"	1975	—	—	—	—	—	—	—	—	—	—	Non-album singles
"Promenade"	1976	—	—	—	—	—	—	—	—	—	—	Just You and Me
"African Summer"	1977	—	—	—	—	—	—	—	—	—	—	Herb Alpert / Hugh Masekela
"Skokiaan" (with Hugh Masekela)	1978	—	—	87	—	—	—	—	—	—	—	Herb Alpert / Hugh Masekela
"Lobo" (with Hugh Masekela)	1978	—	—	—	—	—	—	—	—	—	—	Herb Alpert / Hugh Masekela
"Rise"	1979	1	1	4	19	—	—	—	—	5	13	Rise
"Rotation"	1979	30	23	20	—	—	—	—	—	—	46	Rise
"Street Life"	1980	104	41	65	—	—	—	—	—	—	—	Rise
"Beyond"	1980	50	39	44	—	—	—	—	—	—	—	Beyond
"Kamali"	1980	—	—	64	—	—	—	—	—	—	—	Beyond
"The Continental"	1980	—	—	—	—	—	—	—	—	—	—	Beyond
"Come What May" (with Lani Hall)	1981	—	43	—	—	—	—	—	—	—	—	Non-album single
"Magic Man"	1981	79	22	37	—	—	—	—	—	—	—	Magic Man
"Manhattan Melody"	1981	—	—	74	—	—	—	—	—	—	—	Magic Man
"Route 101"	1982	37	4	—	—	—	—	—	—	—	—	Fandango
"Fandango"	1982	—	26	—	—	—	—	—	—	—	—	Fandango
"Love Me the Way I Am"	1983	—	—	—	—	—	—	—	—	—	—	Fandango
"Garden Party"	1983	81	14	77	—	—	—	—	—	—	—	Blow Your Own Horn
"Red Hot"	1983	77	—	—	—	—	—	—	—	—	—	Blow Your Own Horn
"Come What May" (with Lani Hall) (re-issue)	1984	—	32	—	—	—	—	—	—	—	—	Non-album single
"Bullish"	1984	90	22	52	—	—	—	—	—	—	—	Bullish
"Struttin' on Five"	1984	—	—	—	—	—	—	—	—	—	—	Bullish
"8 Ball"	1985	—	—	73	—	—	—	—	—	—	—	Wild Romance
"You Are the One" (with Brenda Russell)	1985	—	—	—	—	—	—	—	—	—	—	Wild Romance
"African Flame"	1985	—	—	—	—	—	—	—	—	—	—	Wild Romance
"Keep Your Eye on Me"	1987	46	—	3	—	18	—	—	19	—	19	Keep Your Eye on Me
"Diamonds" (with Janet Jackson and Lisa Keith)	1987	5	—	1	47	4	—	15	3	31	27	Keep Your Eye on Me
"Making Love in the Rain" (with Janet Jackson and Lisa Keith)	1987	35	21	7	—	—	—	—	94	—	87	Keep Your Eye on Me
"Our Song"	1987	—	—	—	—	—	—	—	—	—	—	Keep Your Eye on Me
"I Need You"	1988	—	—	—	—	—	—	—	—	—	—	Under a Spanish Moon
"3 O'Clock Jump"	1989	—	—	59	—	—	—	—	—	—	—	My Abstract Heart
"North on South St."	1991	—	—	40	—	—	—	—	—	—	—	North on South St.
"Until We Meet Again"	1997	—	—	—	—	—	—	—	—	—	—	Passion Dance

== See also ==
- 20th century brass instrumentalists
- Herb Alpert: Music for Your Eyes documentary (2003)
- List of artists who reached number one in the United States
- List of artists who reached number one on the U.S. Dance Club Songs chart
- List of trumpeters
