= The Lonely Bull (album) =

Studio album by Herb Alpert & the Tijuana Brass
- Released: December 1962
- Studio: Conway (Hollywood, California)
- Genre: Jazz pop, easy listening
- Length: 30:07
- Label: A&M
- Producer: Herb Alpert, Jerry Moss

Herb Alpert & the Tijuana Brass chronology
The Lonely Bull (1962)	Volume 2 (1963)

Singles from The Lonely Bull
- 1. "The Lonely Bull (El Solo Toro)" Released: August 1962

Professional ratings
Review scores
Source	Rating
AllMusic	4.5/5 stars

The Lonely Bull, released in 1962, is the debut album by Herb Alpert & the Tijuana Brass. It was produced to follow up on the success of the band's first single "The Lonely Bull (El Solo Toro)".

Most of the tracks on the album were geared toward the TJB's Mariachi sound. There were also a few cover versions of popular songs, a trend which would grow in their next two albums, Volume 2 and South of the Border.

"Limbo Rock" covered a novelty dance song that had been a calypso-style hit by Chubby Checker. "Struttin' With Maria" was later used as the theme for a TV game show called Personality, hosted by Larry Blyden. The tune "Acapulco 1922" uses the old song "Oh, You Beautiful Doll" (by Seymour Brown and Nat D. Ayer, 1911) as a starting point, with a mariachi spin.

== Popularity ==
Unlike the single of the same name, The Lonely Bull album did not sell well, at least not immediately. However, with the band's subsequent releases, the album enjoyed a long chart life. It premiered at number 132 on the Billboard Top LPs chart on November 27, 1965, and remained on the chart for 132 weeks, into June 1968. It reached No. 10 for two weeks in March and April 1966.

For the week ending May 21, 1966, four years after its release, The Lonely Bull was one of five Tijuana Brass albums listed in the top 20 of Billboard Magazine’s chart of Top LP’s. The others were What Now My Love (2), Going Places (4), Whipped Cream & Other Delights (8), and South of the Border (17).

== Track listing ==
Side 1
No.	Title	Writer(s)	Length
1.	"The Lonely Bull (El Solo Toro)"	Sol Lake	2:29
2.	"El Lobo" (The Wolf)"	Harry Green, Sol Lake	3:00
3.	"Tijuana Sauerkraut"	Herb Alpert, Jerry Moss	2:44
4.	"Desafinado"	Antônio Carlos Jobim, Newton Mendonca	3:42
5.	"Mexico"	Boudleaux Bryant	2:36
6.	"Never On Sunday"	Manos Hadjidakis, Billy Towne	2:38

Side 2
No.	Title	Writer(s)	Length
1.	"Struttin' With Maria"	Herb Alpert	2:10
2.	"Let It Be Me"	Gilbert Bécaud, Mann Curtis, Pierre Delanoë	2:55
3.	"Acapulco 1922"	Dave Alpert (as Eldon Allan)	2:38
4.	"Limbo Rock"	Billy Strange	2:05
5.	"Crawfish"	Sol Lake, Elsa Doran	2:20
6.	"A Quiet Tear (Lágrima Quieta)"	Herb Alpert	2:23

== Reception ==
The album was originally issued in both mono and stereo versions, though the stereo version essentially had the mono version on the right channel with a separate solo trumpet track on the left. Because of this, critics have noted that when listened on headphones, the stereo album sounds excessively "heavy" on one side. This led many later fans to prefer the mono version.

The original stereo version of the album has since been reissued on the Shout! Factory music label.

The mono version of the title track, "The Lonely Bull," can be found on the Herb Alpert compilation Definitive Hits.

== Charts ==
Chart (1962-68)	Peak position
US Billboard Top LPs	10
