= What Now My Love (song) =

1961 song

Song
- Published: 1961
- Songwriters: Pierre Delanoë (Original French); Carl Sigman (English)
- Composer: Gilbert Bécaud

"What Now My Love" is the English title of a popular song whose original French version, "Et maintenant" (English: "And Now") was written in 1961 by composer Gilbert Bécaud and lyricist Pierre Delanoë. The recurring rhythmic pattern in the background is the Boléro, an 18th-century traditional Spanish dance perhaps best known for Maurice Ravel's reworking in 1928. English lyrics and the title were written by Carl Sigman.

== History ==
Early English versions of the song were recorded by Jane Morgan, Shirley Bassey and Ben E. King. Shirley Bassey's Columbia Single peaked at #5 on the United Kingdom charts in 1962.

Gilbert Bécaud's original version of this song topped the French chart in 1961. Director Claude Lelouch used the song at the climax of his 1974 film Toute une vie, which led to it being released in America under the title And Now My Love.

US Top 40 covers include Sonny & Cher (#14 US, #13 UK) in 1966, Herb Alpert & the Tijuana Brass instrumentally in the same year, and Mitch Ryder the following year. Alpert's recording was nominated for the 1967 Grammy Award for Record of the Year. On January 14, 1973, Elvis Presley performed the song before a live audience of 1 billion people, as part of his satellite show, "Aloha from Hawaii", which was beamed to 43 countries via Intelsat. Judy Garland sang a memorable version of "What Now My Love" on Perry Como's Kraft Music Hall television show in 1966.

== A ==
- Adamo (in French: “Et maintenant”) (2014)
- Aimable: (instrumental: "Et maintenant") (recording date unknown)
- David Alexander (from One Love, One Man) (1996)
  (recording date unknown)
- Alpay (in Turkish: "Seninle Ölmek")
- Herb Alpert & the Tijuana Brass - from What Now My Love (instrumental) (1966)
- Ed Ames - from The Ed Ames Album (1964)
- Elga Andersen - from the EP C’est L’amour Chéri
  (in French: "Et maintenant") (1961)
- Philippe Andrey - from Bonjour Mozart (in French: "Et maintenant") (1962)
- Ray Anthony (instrumental)
- Richard Anthony - from Richard á Londres (in French: "Et maintenant") (1965)
- Eddy Arnold - from The Romantic World of Eddy Arnold (1968)
- Chet Atkins - from It's a Guitar World (instrumental) (1967)
- Isabelle Aubret (in French: "Et maintenant") (1962)
- Nora Aunor - from Handog ni Guy Live (1991)

== B ==
- Long John Baldry - from The Pye Anthology (1998)
- Shirley Bassey, from the album Let's Face the Music (1962); it spent four months on the UK Singles Chart, peaking at #5
- Gilbert Bécaud (in French: “Et maintenant”) (1961)
- Big:French (in French: “Et maintenant”), from the album Diving For Pearls (1986).
- Roy Black (in French: “Et maintenant”) (1969)
- Isabelle Boulay - from Au moment d'être à vous
  (in French: "Et maintenant") (2002)
- Charles Boyer - from Where Does Love Go (1965)
- Brando, an Italo disco project (1983)
- Dee Dee Bridgewater - from J'ai Deux Amours
  (in French: "Et maintenant") (2005)
- The Brothers Four - from Try to Remember (1965)
- Max Bygraves - from Singalongamaxbox Vol. 4 (1973)

== C ==
- Molly Camp - from Molly Camp Sings (1966)
- Lana Cantrell - from Act III (1968)
- Caravelli - from Douce France (instrumental) (1999)
- José Carreras - from Amigos Para Siempre (Friends for Life)
  (in French: "Et maintenant”) (1992)
- Judita Čeřovská (in Czech: "Co bude dál")
- Ann Christy (in French: "Et maintenant") (recording date unknown)
- Petula Clark - from The World's Greatest International Hits (1965)
- Les Classels - from Et Maintenant...Les Classels (in French: "Et maintenant") (1966)
- Richard Clayderman (instrumental)
- Freddy Cole - from The Dreamer in Me: Live at Dizzy Club's Coca-Cola (2008; released 2009)
- Ray Conniff & His Singers - from This is My Song & Other Great Hits (1967)
- Bob Conti & Federico Ramos with Alphonso Johnson, et al. - from Jazz Relaxante (2000)

== D ==
- Dalida (in Italian: "Che mai faro’”) (1962)
- Vic Damone - from Greatest Love Songs of the Century (1997)
- Bill Dana - B-Side of Without Love single, KAPP KJB-38, from the KAPP LP, "Bill Dana in Las Vegas".
- Vic Dana - B-Side of Crystal Chandelier single (1965)
- Anne-Marie David - from Live á Charleroi (in French: “Et maintenant”) (2004)
- John Davidson - from The Time of My Life (1966)
- Sammy Davis Jr. and Buddy Rich - from their album The Sounds of '66 (1966)
- Angelo Debarre (instrumental)
- Joey DeFrancesco - from Plays Sinatra His Way (instrumental) (1998; released 2004)
- Papa John DeFrancesco - from Desert Heat (instrumental) (2006)
- Sacha Distel - from The Night, the Music and You (1979)
- Alice Dona - from Merci Beaucoup Monsieur Bécaud
  (in French: "Et maintenant") (2002)
- Lou Donaldson - from Sentimental Journey (instrumental) (1995)
- Lee Dorsey - from The New Lee Dorsey (1966)
- Oliver Dragojevic - at a live show at the Paris Olympia
- Jean DuShon - from Feeling Good (1966)

== E ==
- Duane Eddy - from The Biggest Twang of Them All (1966)
- Candan Erçetin - from Chante Hier Pour Aujourd'hui
  (in French: “Et maintenant”) (2003)

== F ==
- Lara Fabian and Florent Pagny - from Florent Pagny's album 2
  (in French: "Et maintenant") (2001)
- Marianne Faithfull - from Come My Way (in French: "Et maintenant") (1965)
- Agnetha Fältskog - from My Colouring Book (2004)
- Ferrante & Teicher - from For Lovers of All Ages (1966)
- Eddie Fisher - from Eddie Fisher Today! (1965)
- Connie Francis (English; bilingual: English/French, French/Italian: "Che mai faro")
- Aretha Franklin & Frank Sinatra - from Frank Sinatra's album Duets (1993)
- Carolyn Franklin - from Baby Dynamite (1969)
- Élodie Frégé (in French: "Et maintenant") (recording date unknown)

== G ==
- Judy Garland - from Judy Garland and Liza Minnelli Live at the London Palladium (1965)
- John Gary - from A Heart Filled with Song (1966)
- Lucho Gatica (in French: "Et maintenant") (1962)
- Don Gibson - from The King of Country Soul (1968)
- Jackie Gleason - from Doublin’ in Brass (1968)
- Robert Goulet - from Summer Sounds (1965)
- Earl Grant - from Bali Ha'i (1966)
- Stéphane Grappelli (instrumental)
- Buddy Greco - B-Side of Make Up Your Mind (1963)

== H ==
- Johnny Hallyday - from Tour 66 : Stade de France 2009
  (in French: "Et maintenant") (2009)
- Vince Hill - from At the Club (1966)
- Engelbert Humperdinck - from The Last Waltz (1967)
- Marc Hervieux - (in French: "Et maintenant") (2013)

== I ==
- In-Grid - from La Vie En Rose: Chilling with In-Grid
  (in French: "Et maintenant") (2004)
- Tor Isedal (in Swedish: "Vad gör jag nu?")

== J ==
- Kulka János - from Akarid Vagy Nem (in French: “Et maintenant”) (2010)
- Jocelyne Jocya (in French: "Et maintenant") (recording date unknown)
- Jack Jones - from The Impossible Dream (1966)
- Johnny Mann Singers - from Daydream (1966)
- Jon & Robin - from The Soul of a Boy and Girl (1967)

== K ==
- Patricia Kaas - from Piano Bar (2002)
- Aliza Kashi - from the album A Internacional Aliza Kashi (1963)
- Lainie Kazan (1966)
- Barney Kessel (instrumental)
- Ben E. King (1964)
- Hildegard Knef - from Überall Blühen Rosen
  (in German: "Was wird aus mir") (1978)
- Marianne Kock (in Swedish: "Vad händer nu?")
- Andre Kostelanetz & His Orchestra - from Today's Golden Hits (instrumental) (1966)

== L ==
- Larry's Rebels - from A Study in Black / Madrigal (1967)
- Gloria Lasso - from Gloria Lasso (in French: "Et maintenant") (1965)
- James Last - from Games That Lovers Play (instrumental) (1967)
- Steve Lawrence - from The Steve Lawrence Show (1965)
- Amanda Lear - from My Happiness (2014)
- Brenda Lee - from Coming on Strong (1966)
- Michel Leeb (in French: "Et maintenant") (recording date unknown)
- Raymond Lefèvre (instrumental)
- Grégory Lemarchal, from the 2007 album La Voix d'un ange
  (in French: "Et maintenant")
- Lee Lessack - from Chanteur (2011)
- The Lettermen - from New Song for Young Love (1966)
- Ramsey Lewis Trio - from Dancing in the Street (instrumental) (1967)
- Liberace - from What Now My Love (1969)
- Helmut Lotti - from My Tribute to The King (2002)
- The Norman Luboff Choir with The Melachrino Strings - from Forever Frank (1996) (recording date unknown)
- Carin Lundin with Mathias Algotsson & Johan Setterlind - from What Now My Love? (2016)
- Pat Lundy - from Soul Ain't Nothin’ But the Blues (1968)
- Arthur Lyman (instrumental)

== M ==
- Dominique Magloire - from The Voice: la plus belle voix (season 1) (in French: "Et maintenant") (2012)
- Malmö Fire Brigade Big Band with Loa Falkman & Meta Roos - from Strangers in the Night (2001)
- Mantovani & His Orchestra - from The Mantovani Touch (instrumental) (1968)
- Diane Marino - from On the Street Where You Live (2004)
- Martha Reeves & The Vandellas - from Sugar ‘n’ Spice (1969)
- Grady Martin (instrumental)
- Al Martino - from I Love You Because (1963)
- Johnny Mathis - from So Nice (1966)
- Paul Mauriat & His Orchestra - from The Best of France (instrumental) (1967)
- Pino Mauro (in Italian: "Se tu lo vuoi")
- Marilyn Maye - from Step to the Rear (1967)
- Freddie McCoy - from Soul Yogi (instrumental) (1968)
- Barbara McNair - from The Real Barbara McNair (1969)
- Melvis & His Gentlemen - from Batman single (1966)
- Marilyn Michaels - from The Fantastic and Exciting Debut of Marilyn Michaels (1965)
- Midnight Band & Peter Getz - from Let There Be Love (2000)
- Ainars Mielavs (of Mielavs un Pārcēlāji) - from Impressions
  (in French: "Et maintenant") (2009)
- Milva (in Italian: "Che mai farò") (1961)
- Eddy Mitchell - from Seul (in French: "Et maintenant") (1966)
- Willie Mitchell - from It's What's Happenin’ (1966)
- Jane Morgan (first US chart version, Music Vendor #129, March–April 1962)
- Lee Morgan - from The Rajah (1966; Released 1985)
- Nana Mouskouri - from The Girl from Greece Sings (1962)

== N ==
- Jim Nabors - from Jim Nabors sings Love Me with All Your Heart (1966)
- Willie Nelson - from Make Way for Willie Nelson (1967)
- Anthony Newley - B-Side of Why single (1962)
- Wayne Newton - from Song of the Year...Style (1967)
- NOFX - from They've Actually Gotten Worse Live! (2007)
- Nomadi - from I Nomadi...Best & Rarities) (2010)
  (recorded between 1965 and 1979)

== O ==
- Roy Orbison - Roy Orbison's Many Moods (1969)
- Orion - from Feelings (1981)
- Frank Oz as Miss Piggy - from The Muppet Show (season 1, episode 11) (1976)

== P ==
- Patti Page (a 1966 TV appearance)
- Florent Pagny - from Ma liberté de chanter - Live acoustic
  (in French: "Et maintenant") (2012)
- Fausto Papetti - from 3a Raccolta (instrumental) (1962)
- Joe Pass - from A Sign of the Times (1966)
- The Peddlers - from Freewheelers (1967)
- Franck Pourcel et son Grand Orchestre - from Made in France (instrumental) (1969)
- Elvis Presley - from Aloha from Hawaii via Satellite (1973)
- Francesco Pugliese & Rachele Amenta - from Live album Lo Sento...Puntata 10

== Q ==
- The Quin Tikis - Later appeared on the 2011 album Waiata : Maori Showbands, Balladeers & Pop Stars (1968)

== R ==
- Susan Rafey - from Hurt So Bad (1966)
- Lou Rawls - from Soulin' (1966)
- Della Reese - from One More Time (1967)
- Irene Reid - from I Ain't Doing Too Bad (1999)
- Ginette Reno - from the 1978 album En Concert (in French: "Et maintenant") (recorded 1968–69)
- Stan Ridgway - from The Way I Feel Today (1998)
- The Righteous Brothers - from Go Ahead and Cry (1966)
- Gene Rockwell - from Portrait of Gene (1968)
- Edmundo Ros and His Orchestra - from Heading South...of the Border (1970)
- Mitch Ryder (1967)
- Ricchi e Poveri (in Italian: "E no e no")

== S ==
- Joanie Samra with Various Artists - from Still Me (2016)
- Sandler and Young - from Side by Side (1966)
- Patrick Saussois (instrumental)
- George Semper - from Makin’ Waves (1966)
- Sandie Shaw - from the album The Sandie Shaw Supplement (1968)
- Frank Sinatra - That's Life (1966)
- O. C. Smith - from The Dynamic O. C. Smith (1967)
- Dick Smothers - from Saturday Night at the World (1967)
- Javier Solis (in Spanish: "Porque Me Dejas")
- Sonny & Cher - from The Wondrous World of Sonny & Chér (1966)
- Sounds Incorporated from Sounds Incorporated (instrumental) (1966)
- Dakota Staton - from A Pocket of Love Letters (1996; released 1999)
- Barbra Streisand - from Je m'appelle Barbra (1966)
- Enzo Stuarti - from Soft & Sentimental (1966)
- The Supremes - Live on TV show The Hollywood Palace (October 29, 1966 Episode)
- Les Stentors (in French: "Et maintenant")
- Vicki Sunday - from Reminiscing (1971)
- Ginjiro Sweet (in Japanese and in French: "Et maintenant")

== T ==
- The T-Bones - from Sippin N Chippin (1966)
- Grady Tate - from Feeling Life (1969)
- The Modernaires from The "Mods" Salute Herb Albert and The Tijuana Brass Lead vocal Autie Goodman Columbia Records (1966)
- The Temptations - from The Temptations in a Mellow Mood (1967)
- Agnaldo Timóteo (in Portuguese: "E Agora")
- Richard Tucker with Gilbert Bécaud - from Richard Tucker's album What Now My Love (1966)
- Stanley Turrentine (instrumental)
- Will Tura (in Dutch: "Wat moet ik doen") (1981)

== V ==
- Jerry Vale - from The Impossible Dream (1967)
- Caterina Valente with Roland Shaw Orchestra - from Valente & Violins (1964)
- Carla Valenti - from Follow Your Heart (2004)
- Dana Valery - (in French: “Et maintenant”) (1963)
- Sarah Vaughan - from The New Scene (1966)
- The Ventures - from $1,000,000 Weekend (1967)
- Violetta Villas (1969)

== W ==
- Marianne Weber: (in Dutch: "Goodbye My Love")
- Lenny Welch (1966)
- Joe Wilder (instrumental)
- Andy Williams - from Love, Andy (1967)
- Nancy Wilson - from Just for Now (1967)
- Walter Navarro - for his 1972 album "King of Balladeers" by Pioneer Records.
- Klaus Wunderlich (instrumental)

== Y ==
- Johnny Young - from All My Loving (1967)

== Z ==
- Zamfir - from A Return to Romance (instrumental) (1988)
- Måns Zelmerlöw - Video appears on MZW (in French: "Et maintenant") (2009)
