= The Lonely Bull (song) =

"The Lonely Bull (El Solo Torro)"
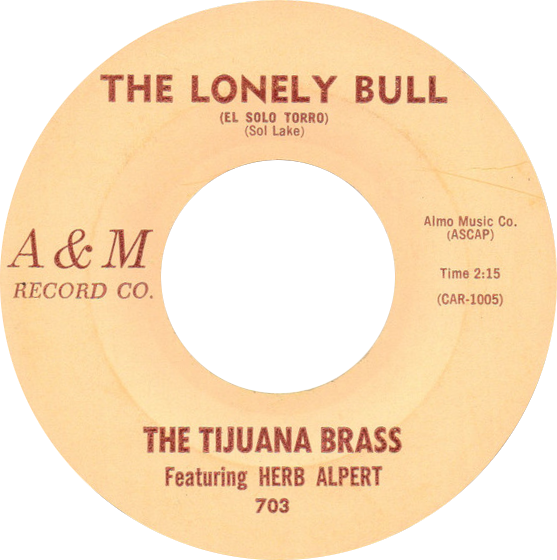
- One of side-A labels of US single

Single by Herb Alpert & the Tijuana Brass

from the album The Lonely Bull
- B-side: "Acapulco 1922"
- Released: August 1962
- Recorded: August 1962
- Studio: Conway, Hollywood, California
- Genre: Easy listening; pop; exotica
- Length: 2:15
- Label: A&M
- Songwriter: Sol Lake
- Producers: Herb Alpert, Jerry Moss

Herb Alpert & the Tijuana Brass singles chronology
"The Lonely Bull (El Solo Torro)" (1962)	"Let It Be Me" (1962)

Alternative release
- One of side-A labels of UK single

Official audio
- "The Lonely Bull" (El Solo Toro) on YouTube

"The Lonely Bull (El Solo Toro)" is a song by Sol Lake recorded by Herb Alpert and the Tijuana Brass among others. The song was the title track to the album The Lonely Bull, released in December 1962. The Herb Alpert single represents the first release on A&M Records. Its original title was "Twinkle Star".

== Spanish title ==
"El Solo Toro" is given on the album as the Spanish translation of "The Lonely Bull", but the words el solo toro directly translate as "the bull alone" or "the only bull". The translator evidently was not aware that in Spanish the adjective "solo" should have come after the noun "toro". "Solo" means "alone", rather than "lonely"; the proper translation of "lonely" is "solitario". In English, the adjective "lonely" precedes the noun "bull". In Spanish, the noun "toro" (the bull) comes before the adjective, "solitario". Thus, the correct translation of "The Lonely Bull" is "El Toro Solitario".

== Background ==
While experimenting with the sound of an overdubbed trumpet, Herb Alpert recorded this song in his garage. The single and album recordings of the song were recorded at Conway Recording Studios in Hollywood by members of The Wrecking Crew, and featured the sounds of a crowd cheering "Olé" inside a bullfight arena in Mexico, as well as the sounds of the trumpets announcing the matador before he enters the bullring. The song features a mandolin, a bass guitar, drums, and a wordless chorus, featuring a solo soprano. A video for the song was filmed in 1967 inside the Toreo de Tijuana bullring.

== Chart history ==
In the US, "The Lonely Bull" was a hit, peaking at #6 on the Hot 100, the same position on Cash Box and peaking at No. 1 in Australia.

Chart (1962)	Peak position
U.S. Billboard Hot 100	6
U.S. Cashbox	6
AUS Top Singles	1

== Other recorded versions ==
- The Ventures recorded a version for their 1963 Dolton album, The Ventures Play Telstar and the Lonely Bull, BST 8019.
- The Shadows recorded a cover version in 1964 on the album Dance with The Shadows. The Untouchables released a cover version on their 1985 album Wild Child.
- Harry James recorded a version in 1965 on the album Harry James Plays Green Onions & Other Great Hits. (Dot DLP 3634 and DLP 25634).
- The Dream Syndicate recorded a version for the 1997 and subsequent releases of their album Out of the Grey

== Samples ==
- This song is sampled in the song "Tres Delinquentes" by Delinquent Habits.
- This song is sampled in the song "All Night" by The Trash Can Sinatras on their 2016 album Wild Pendulum.

== Popular culture ==
- The chorus of the song is briefly quoted in the song “This Town” on the 1977 album Now by The Tubes.
- The song is featured during a montage sequence in Cameron Crowe's film Jerry Maguire. It also appears in the Nicolas Cage film Matchstick Men, along with other jazz songs.
- On the inner sleeve of the Morrissey single "I'm Throwing My Arms Around Paris", his guitarist Boz Boorer can be seen holding "The Lonely Bull."
