= Ervan Coleman =

Ervan F. "Bud" Coleman (July 7, 1921 – May 26, 1967) was an American guitar and mandolin player. A member of the Baja Marimba Band, he also worked with Herb Alpert & The Tijuana Brass and wrote the hit track "Tijuana Taxi" for the band.

On the liner notes for the song "Tijuana Taxi", on Herb Alpert's Definitive Hits, Alpert wrote: "[Tijuana Taxi] was written by Bud Coleman who also played guitar and mandolin on many Tijuana Brass recordings until his untimely death. Bud wrote some great songs for us, but this one had a fabulous visual image of a Tijuana Taxi moving off a road and taking short cuts through the fields of Tijuana, Mexico."

"Tijuana Taxi" was originally released on the 1965 hit album, Going Places which topped the US album chart.

== Death ==
Coleman died in 1967 from surgical complications. The song "Bud" is a tribute song for Coleman and was released on the 1967 Herb Alpert & the Tijuana Brass album Herb Alpert's Ninth. Coleman's widow, Eleanor, was given co-writing credits for this song. Julius Wechter's Baja Marimba Band also recorded a tribute song entitled "For Bud" on their 1968 album Do You Know The Way To San Jose. Coleman's son, Gregory (1949–2005) was an accomplished classical guitarist and musician.

== Discography ==
With The Everly Brothers

- Two Yanks in England (Warner Bros., 1966)
- The Everly Brothers Sing (Warner Bros., 1967)

With Lorne Greene

- Lorne Greene's American West (RCA Victor, 1965)

With Irene Kral

- Wonderful Life (Mainstream, 1965)

With Nancy Sinatra

- Boots (Reprise, 1966)

With The T-Bones

- No Matter What Shape (Your Stomach's In) (Liberty Records, 1966)
