= Julius Wechter =

American musician and composer (1935–1999)

- Born: May 10, 1935
- Died: February 1, 1999 (aged 63)
- Occupations: Musician and Composer

Julius Wechter (May 10, 1935 – February 1, 1999) was an American musician and composer who played the marimba and vibraphone. He also played various percussion instruments. He composed the song "Spanish Flea" for Herb Alpert and was leader of the Baja Marimba Band.

== Biography ==
Born in Chicago, Wechter played vibraphone (vibes) and percussion for the Martin Denny group in the 1950s. In the early 1960s, he moved on to movie soundtracks and television, as well as session work with the Wrecking Crew for the likes of the Beach Boys, the Monkees, Sonny & Cher, and various Phil Spector productions. His Beach Boys contributions include the climactic timpani during the choruses of "Do You Wanna Dance?" and prominent vibraphone on "Let's Go Away for Awhile".

He began his long and successful association with Herb Alpert and his Tijuana Brass when he played percussion on the Tijuana Brass's first hit, "The Lonely Bull", in 1962. He later composed "Spanish Flea". Playing marimba and vibes on many of the songs on Alpert's subsequent albums in the 1960s, as well as writing at least one song on most of those albums, Wechter contributed much to the Tijuana Brass sound and style without receiving public credit for it at the time.

Encouraged by Alpert, Wechter formed the Baja Marimba Band c. 1963 and was quite successful. The "BMB" placed four chart songs in Billboard's Top 100, and many more on its Easy Listening Top 40. When the band disbanded in the mid 1970s, Wechter turned his attention to TV and movies again, scoring the Disney film Midnight Madness. He continued to play with Herb Alpert, joining his touring version of the Tijuana Brass in the mid 1970s.

In his later years, he devoted himself to psychology, earned a master's degree, and served as vice president of the Southern California chapter of the Tourette Syndrome Association.

Wechter died at his home in California of lung cancer, at the age of 63, a day after his song "Spanish Flea" was used in the Simpsons episode "Sunday, Cruddy Sunday".

== Selected compositions ==
- 1964: "Up Cherry Street"
- 1965: "Spanish Flea"
- 1966: "Brasilia"
- 1966: "Bean Bag" (with Herb Alpert)
- 1966: "Blue Sunday"
- 1967: "Shades Of Blue"
- 1967: "Flea Bag"
- 1968: "Panama"
- 1968: "Flyin' High"
- 1970: "Robbers and Cops"
