= Jerry Moss =

American record executive (1935–2023)

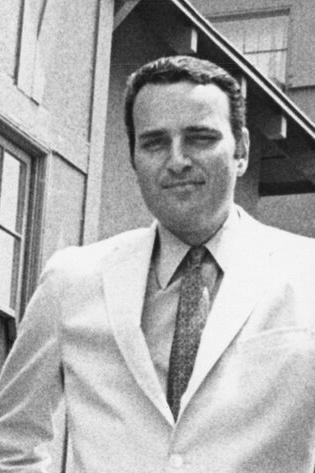
- Moss in 1967
- Born: Jerome Sheldon Moss; May 8, 1935; New York City, U.S.
- Died: August 16, 2023 (aged 88); Los Angeles, California, U.S.
- Resting place: Westwood Village Memorial Park Cemetery
- Education: Brooklyn College (BA)
- Occupations: Record company executive Racehorse owner/breeder
- Known for: A&M Records, Zenyatta, Giacomo, Tiago, Madeo
- Spouse: Tina Morse (m. 2019)
- Honors: Grammy Trustees Award (1997); Hollywood Walk of Fame (1999); Rock and Roll Hall of Fame (2006); Big Sport of Turfdom Award (2009)

Jerome Sheldon Moss (May 8, 1935 – August 16, 2023) was an American recording executive, best known for being the co-founder of A&M Records, along with trumpet player and bandleader Herb Alpert.

== Music career ==
=== Early stages (1958–1960) ===
After graduating from Brooklyn College with a degree in English and serving in the United States Army, Moss began his music career by promoting "16 Candles", a 1958 hit for the Crests on Coed Records.

=== A&M Records (1960–1999) ===
In 1960, he moved to California, where he teamed up with Herb Alpert, forming Carnival Records in 1962 and running the company from an office in Alpert's garage. Discovering that the name was already taken, they dubbed their newly founded company A&M Records.

Moss and Alpert agreed in 1989 to sell A&M to PolyGram for a reported $500 million. Both continued to manage the label until 1993, when they left because of frustrations with PolyGram's constant pressure to force the label to fit into its corporate culture. In 1998, Alpert and Moss sued PolyGram for breach of the integrity clause, eventually settling for an additional $200 million payment in 2003.

A&M, itself, would later be merged into Geffen and Interscope Records, which would then combine as Interscope Geffen A&M Records (now Interscope Capitol Labels Group) following a December 1998 Seagram merger of PolyGram and Universal Music Group.

=== Almo Sounds (1994–2000) and later life ===
Alpert and Moss then expanded their Almo Sounds music publishing company to produce records as well, using it as a vehicle for Alpert's music. Almo Sounds imitates the former company culture embraced by Alpert and Moss when they started A&M.

Moss, Herb Alpert and Herb's cousin Steve Alpert were inducted into the Rock and Roll Hall of Fame in 2006 in the non-performer category.

== Horse racing ==
In 2004, Moss was appointed to the California Horse Racing Board, replacing longtime television producer Alan Landsburg. Moss was a longtime horse-breeder and owner who won the 2005 Kentucky Derby with Giacomo, the first horse he had ever entered in that race, and the 2009 Breeders' Cup Classic with Zenyatta. In 2011, he was inducted into the Southern California Jewish Sports Hall of Fame.

== Art collection ==
Part of his art collection sold for over $60 million at Christie's New York on 9 November 2023.

== Personal life and death ==
Moss was Jewish. He married three times: his marriages to Helen Sandra Rusetos and to Ann Holbrook ended in divorce. Moss married Tina Morse in 2019, after dating since 2016. They lived in Bel Air, California and Maui, Hawaii.

He died from natural causes at his Bel Air home on August 16, 2023, at the age of 88.

== Philanthropy ==
In 2020, Moss and his wife Tina donated $25,000,000 to the Los Angeles Music Center, the largest single contribution ever made to the venue.
