= List of Billboard number-one albums of 1955 =

These are the Billboard magazine number-one albums of 1955, per the Billboard albums chart.

== Chart history ==
Chart history
Issue date	Album	Artist(s)	Label	Ref.
January 1	The Student Prince	Mario Lanza	RCA Victor	
January 8	The Student Prince	Mario Lanza	RCA Victor	
January 15	The Student Prince	Mario Lanza	RCA Victor	
January 22	The Student Prince	Mario Lanza	RCA Victor	
January 29	The Student Prince	Mario Lanza	RCA Victor	
February 5	The Student Prince	Mario Lanza	RCA Victor	
February 12	The Student Prince	Mario Lanza	RCA Victor	
February 19	The Student Prince	Mario Lanza	RCA Victor	
February 26	The Student Prince	Mario Lanza	RCA Victor	
March 5	Music, Martinis and Memories	Jackie Gleason	Capitol	
March 12	Music, Martinis and Memories	Jackie Gleason	Capitol	
March 19	The Student Prince	Mario Lanza	RCA Victor	
March 26	The Student Prince	Mario Lanza	RCA Victor	
April 2	The Student Prince	Mario Lanza	RCA Victor	
April 9	The Student Prince	Mario Lanza	RCA Victor	
April 16	The Student Prince	Mario Lanza	RCA Victor	
April 23	The Student Prince	Mario Lanza	RCA Victor	
April 30	The Student Prince	Mario Lanza	RCA Victor	
May 7	The Student Prince	Mario Lanza	RCA Victor	
May 14	The Student Prince	Mario Lanza	RCA Victor	
May 21	The Student Prince	Mario Lanza	RCA Victor	
May 28	Crazy Otto	Crazy Otto	Decca	
June 4	Crazy Otto	Crazy Otto	Decca	
June 11	Starring Sammy Davis Jr.	Sammy Davis Jr.	Decca	
June 18	Starring Sammy Davis Jr.	Sammy Davis Jr.	Decca	
June 25	Starring Sammy Davis Jr.	Sammy Davis Jr.	Decca	
July 2	Starring Sammy Davis Jr.	Sammy Davis Jr.	Decca	
July 9	Starring Sammy Davis Jr.	Sammy Davis Jr.	Decca	
July 16	Starring Sammy Davis Jr.	Sammy Davis Jr.	Decca	
July 23	Lonesome Echo	Jackie Gleason	Capitol	
July 30	Lonesome Echo	Jackie Gleason	Capitol	
August 6	Love Me or Leave Me	Doris Day / Soundtrack	Columbia	
August 13	No album chart			
August 20	No album chart			
August 27	No album chart			
September 3	Love Me or Leave Me	Doris Day / Soundtrack	Columbia	
September 10	Love Me or Leave Me	Doris Day / Soundtrack	Columbia	
September 17	Love Me or Leave Me	Doris Day / Soundtrack	Columbia	
September 24	Love Me or Leave Me	Doris Day / Soundtrack	Columbia	
October 1	Love Me or Leave Me	Doris Day / Soundtrack	Columbia	
October 8	Love Me or Leave Me	Doris Day / Soundtrack	Columbia	
October 15	Love Me or Leave Me	Doris Day / Soundtrack	Columbia	
October 22	Love Me or Leave Me	Doris Day / Soundtrack	Columbia	
October 29	Love Me or Leave Me	Doris Day / Soundtrack	Columbia	
November 5	Love Me or Leave Me	Doris Day / Soundtrack	Columbia	
November 12	Love Me or Leave Me	Doris Day / Soundtrack	Columbia	
November 19	Love Me or Leave Me	Doris Day / Soundtrack	Columbia	
November 26	Love Me or Leave Me	Doris Day / Soundtrack	Columbia	
December 3	Love Me or Leave Me	Doris Day / Soundtrack	Columbia	
December 10	No album chart			
December 17	No album chart			
December 24	No album chart			
December 31	No album chart			

== See also ==
- 1955 in music
- List of number-one albums (United States)
