= Crazy Otto =

Crazy Otto may refer to:

- Fritz Schulz-Reichel (1912–1990), a German pianist known under the stage name Crazy Otto
  - Crazy Otto (album), a 1955 album by Crazy Otto
  - The Crazy Otto Medley, a ragtime medley originally by Crazy Otto, later recorded by Johnny Maddox
    - Johnny Maddox (1927–2018), an American pop musician
- Crazy Otto, a Pac-Man ROM hack by General Computer Corporation, subsequently developed into Ms. Pac-Man
