= Music for Lovers Only =

1952 album by Jackie Gleason

Studio album by Jackie Gleason
- Released: October 27, 1952
- Genre: Easy listening
- Label: Capitol Records
- Producer: Richard Jones

Jackie Gleason chronology
Music for Lovers Only (1952)	Lover's Rhapsody (1953)

Music for Lovers Only (or Jackie Gleason Presents Music for Lovers Only) is a studio album of easy-listening music by Jackie Gleason, wherein he conducted an orchestra performing standards. It was released by Capitol Records on October 27, 1952, as a 10-inch LP with eight songs. It was reissued as an EP in January 1953, followed in 1955 by a 12-inch LP with eight additional songs. The extent of Gleason's involvement with the album's creation has generated debate since its release.

== Background ==
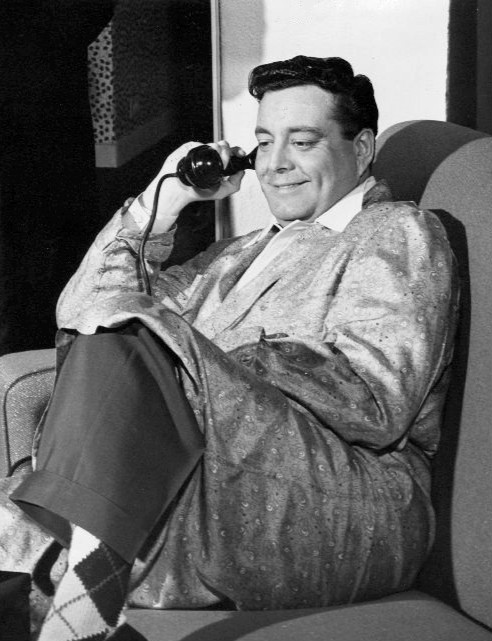
Jackie Gleason in May 1953.

In January 1952, Gleason, who was then the host of the DuMont Network's television program Cavalcade of Stars, was offered a three-year exclusive contract by CBS worth $6 million (approximately $63 million in 2021). Gleason accepted and upon signing the contract, he took a two-week vacation and announced that he would be leaving Cavalcade of Stars in June. Immediately following his departure, he began to adapt the program into The Jackie Gleason Show for CBS. It was during this period that Gleason began his musical career. He assembled a 27-piece orchestra and made a number of recordings with them, including the "Melancholy Serenade" that would become the theme song for The Jackie Gleason Show.

Announcements of a forthcoming release of an LP of instrumental music conducted by Gleason, the first in a separate three-year contract for Capitol Records, were made in July 1952. Gleason said in an interview that same month that he had already composed the music and designed the cover for Lover's Rhapsody, which followed the release of Music for Lovers Only. He also said that he had been inspired by Bing Crosby to pursue artistic and merchandising opportunities outside of his main career as an actor, for which purposes he founded Jackie Gleason Enterprises. Gleason called his musical team Music for Lovers Only, which he said indicated the kind of music they played. His first album would subsequently bear the same name.

== Recording ==
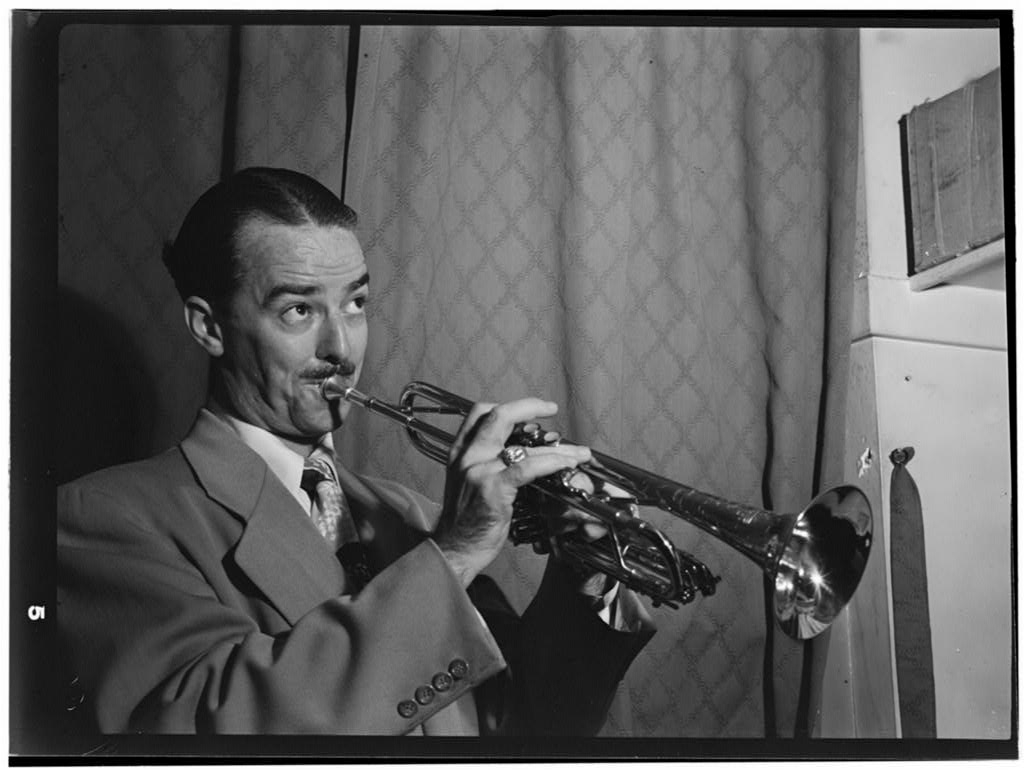
Bobby Hackett in 1946.

=== Production ===
According to Gleason, he conceived the idea of an album of "slow and dreamy music" in 1941, but "couldn't get anyone interested in it at the time". In 1942, Gleason was cast in an uncredited role in the film Orchestra Wives. On the set, he met Bobby Hackett, a member of the Glenn Miller Orchestra, who played himself in the film. Despite Hackett's dental problems that made it difficult for him to play his preferred instrument, the trumpet, Glenn Miller hired him as a personal favor. Impressed by Hackett's trumpet playing, Gleason expressed hope for a future musical collaboration. When preparation for Music for Lovers Only began in 1952, Gleason engaged Hackett to play solo trumpet.

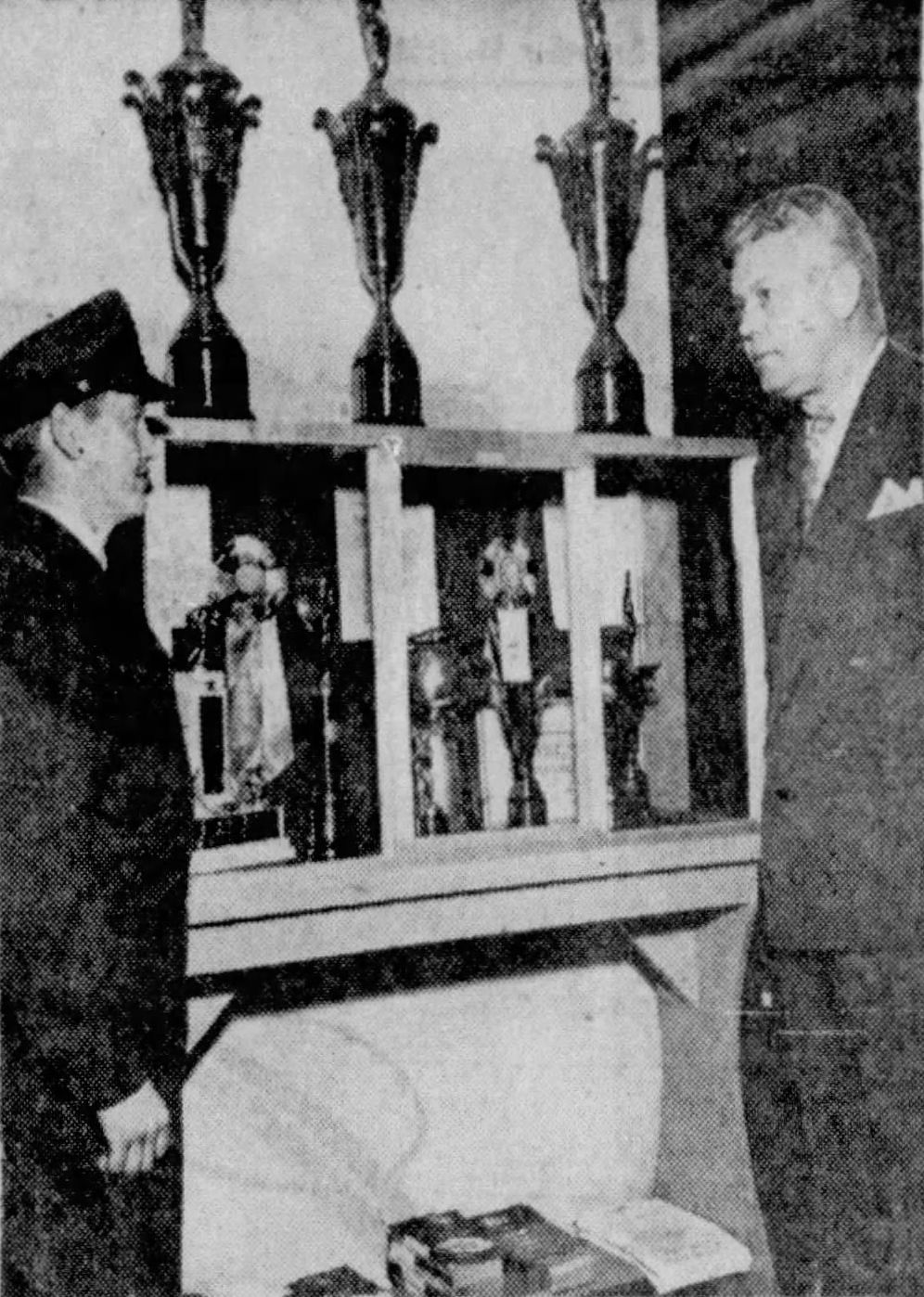
Composer and arranger Pete King (right) in December 1953.

Record labels were skeptical of Gleason's musical efforts. He initially proposed Music for Lovers Only and other instrumental albums to American Decca, which rejected them. Gleason's manager, Bullets Durgom, then persuaded Capitol Records to pay an advance of $1,000 (approximately $10,400 in 2021) in exchange for promotion on The Jackie Gleason Show. They agreed on the condition that Gleason finance most of the production himself. Because of Gleason's fame as a comedian and concern that the public would not take his musical work seriously, he took care to maintain seriousness in his conduct with his musicians and in the design of the album's jacket cover.

The recordings for Music for Lovers Only took place in New York City during the summer of 1952. According to Capitol, recordings of the master takes took two sessions of three hours each.

=== Questions about authorship of arrangements ===
The precise nature of Gleason's role in the making of Music for Lovers Only has been a matter of speculation since its release. Although the album credits him with having presented, selected, and conducted the music on the album, it also credits Pete King (as C. Dudley King, Jr.) and producer Richard Jones as arrangers. The widespread public perception was that Gleason had either played a lead role as arranger, or was taking credit for another's work. In interviews, Gleason confirmed that his role in the production of the album went beyond selection and conducting, but also acknowledged King's work as arranger and collaborator.

Although Gleason had no formal musical training, he could play trumpet, piano, and organ sufficiently well to convey his ideas to King. "I pick the notes out on an organ", Gleason told the New York Daily News. "I have a way of marking them down so [King] can interpret them". Gleason struggled to convey his ideas to professional musicians. Having no knowledge of musical terminology, he resorted to poetic metaphors which they found frustrating to understand.

King said that despite Gleason's lack of musical education, his ability was "a little more than musicians credit him with and a little less than the public thinks he knows". Hackett expressed contradictory opinions about Gleason's acumen, saying on one occasion that professional musicians were "always amazed" by him, while on another saying that his principal contribution to the recordings was that "he brought the checks". Gordon Jenkins said Gleason's work consisted of "sit[ting] in the control room puffing a fat cigar while his arrangers do the conducting".

=== Release ===
Music for Lovers Only was released on LP by Capitol Records on October 27, 1952, followed by an EP in January 1953, one of Capitol's first four releases in that format. In 1955, a 12-inch LP with eight additional songs was issued. A stereo remake with the same personnel was issued in 1958. In 1957, Dick Haymes recorded a vocal cover of Gleason's song, "My Love for Carmen", accompanied by Gleason and his orchestra.

== Reception ==
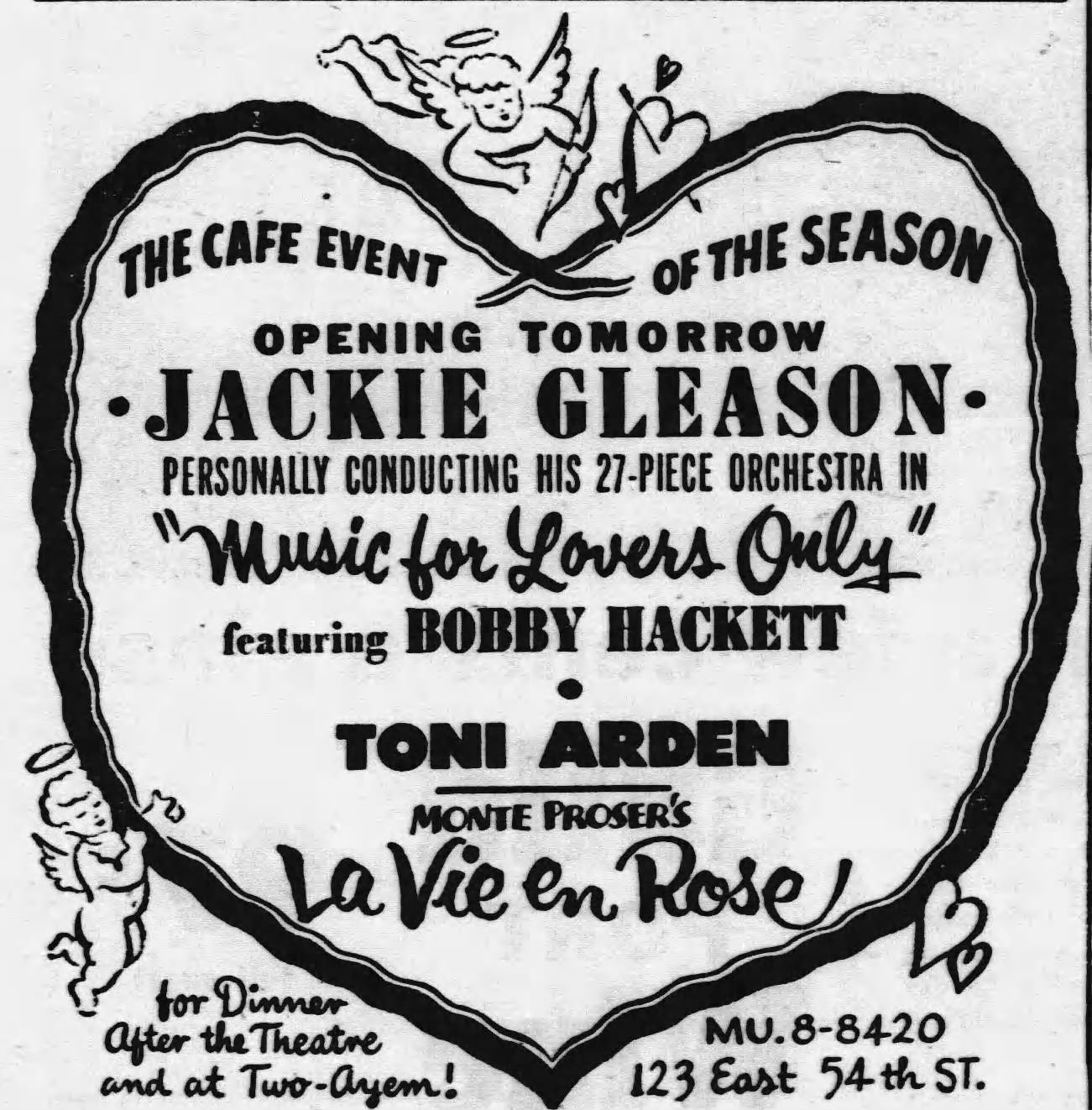
Advertisement for live performance on February 12, 1953, of Jackie Gleason's Music for Lovers Only.

=== Success ===
Music for Lovers Only was widely praised upon its release and became an enduring bestseller on both LP and EP, reaching No. 1 on Billboard magazine's pop album chart and remaining in the Top 10 for 153 weeks. In April 1953, Dorothy Kilgallen reported that the album had sold over 100,000 copies; by June, it was the bestselling album yet in Capitol Records' history. In March 1954, Music for Lovers Only was joined by two later Gleason albums in the Billboard Top 10. It was also one of the bestselling LPs in that format's first decade of existence.

Hackett's solo trumpet performance drew much critical attention. Walter Winchell said that it set the album's "groove on fire". Charles Menees in the St. Louis Post-Dispatch said that it was the album's "big attraction", adding that "Bobby Hackett With Strings" would have made for a suitable alternative name for it. Avilda Peters called his playing "a thrilling sound which breaks through the orchestral arrangement of strings and reeds".

Gleason's appearance as a musical arranger and conductor also elicited commentary and was well received. "Gleason doesn't over-orchestrate", said Peters. "He simply offers smooth, soft, candlelight-mood music that appeals to both young and old". Tom E. Danson wrote that in Music for Lovers Only Gleason "prove[d] conclusively that he's as agile with the baton as in the humor department". Doris E. Bynum in the Orlando Sentinel balked at the album's name, but called its arrangements "sheer heaven".

=== Live performances ===
The success of Music for Lovers Only resulted in Gleason's public debut as bandleader on February 12, 1953, at the La Vie en Rose nightclub in New York City, wherein he performed the music from the album in a program shared with Toni Arden. Gleason said he did it as a favor to his friend Monte Proser, the club's proprietor. "Monte has this club that needs unusual attractions because he's keeping it out of the usual entertainment rut and he said he thought my band could do some business for him", Gleason said. "Monte's done some things for me in the past. I couldn't turn him down". He later recalled that he found the experience of conducting an orchestra in person "tough" and, because of his inability to read music, was required to memorize 28 different arrangements. Among those who attended Gleason's debut were Steve Allen, Milton Berle, Johnnie Ray, and Jackie Coogan.

In March 1953, Gleason said that he was considering forming two Music for Lovers Only orchestras, led respectively by Hackett and Billy Butterfield, and sending them on tour. Gleason participated in later live performances, joined by the entire cast of The Jackie Gleason Show, but delegated leadership of the orchestra to Sammy Spear, the show's bandleader.

=== Legacy ===
Over 40 albums by Gleason followed the release of Music for Lovers Only. It was an early example of a "theme album", referred to after the advent of rock music as a "concept album". Its success also led to rival record labels issuing their own "Music for" albums, which were described by The New York Times as "music with a function, a sort of modern Gebrauchsmusik".

Gleason evoked the sound of Music for Lovers Only in his final album, Romeo and Juliet: A Theme for Lovers, which was released in late 1969.

== Track listing ==
=== Original 1952 track listing ===
Side A
No.	Title	Lyrics	Music	Length
1.	"Alone Together"	Howard Dietz	Arthur Schwartz	3:07
2.	"My Funny Valentine"	Lorenz Hart	Richard Rodgers	3:23
3.	"But Not For Me"	Ira Gershwin	George Gershwin	2:51
4.	"Love (Your Spell is Everywhere)"	Elsie Janis	Edmund Goulding	2:43

Side B
No.	Title	Lyrics	Music	Length
1.	"I'm in the Mood for Love"	Dorothy Fields	Jimmy McHugh	3:32
2.	"Love Is Here To Stay"	Ira Gershwin	George Gershwin	3:24
3.	"I Only Have Eyes For You"	Al Dubin	Harry Warren	3:21
4.	"Body and Soul"	Edward Heyman, Robert Sour, Frank Eyton	Johnny Green	3:18

=== Expanded 1955 release listing ===
Side A
No.	Title	Lyrics	Music	Length
1.	"Alone Together"	Howard Dietz	Arthur Schwartz	3:07
2.	"My Funny Valentine"	Lorenz Hart	Richard Rodgers	3:23
3.	"But Not For Me"	Ira Gershwin	George Gershwin	2:51
4.	"Love (Your Spell is Everywhere)"	Elsie Janis	Edmund Goulding	2:43
5.	"I'm in the Mood for Love"	Dorothy Fields	Jimmy McHugh	3:32
6.	"Love Is Here To Stay"	Ira Gershwin	George Gershwin	3:24
7.	"I Only Have Eyes For You"	Al Dubin	Harry Warren	3:21
8.	"Body and Soul"	Edward Heyman, Robert Sour, Frank Eyton	Johnny Green	3:18

Side B
No.	Title	Lyrics	Music	Length
1.	"Little Girl"	Madeline Hyde	Francis Henry	3:24
2.	"I Cover the Waterfront"	Johnny Green	Edward Heyman	3:43
3.	"Some Day"	Brian Hooker	Rudolf Friml	3:28
4.	"If I Had You"		Jimmy Campbell and Reg Connelly with Ted Shapiro	3:32
5.	"When a Woman Loves a Man"	Johnny Mercer	Gordon Jenkins, Bernard D. Hanighen	2:28
6.	"A Stranger in Town"	Mort Greene	Leigh Harline	2:46
7.	"A Moonlight Saving Time"	Irving Kahal	Harry Richman	2:29
8.	"My Love for Carmen"		Jackie Gleason	3:20

== Personnel ==
- Richard Jones — producer, arranger
- Jackie Gleason — conductor, arranger, and composer (of "My Love for Carmen")
- Pete King (credited as C. Dudley King, Jr.) — arranger
- Bobby Hackett — trumpet
