= Jackie Gleason Plays Romantic Jazz =

Studio album by Jackie Gleason
- Released: 1955
- Genre: Mood music
- Label: Capitol

Jackie Gleason chronology
| And Awaaay We Go! (1955) | Jackie Gleason Plays Romantic Jazz (1955) | Music to Remember Her (1955) |

Jackie Gleason Plays Romantic Jazz, also known as Romantic Jazz, is a studio album by television personality, Jackie Gleason. It was released in 1955 on Capitol Records (catalog no. W-568). Gleason conducted the orchestra.

Romantic Jazz debuted on the Billboard magazine pop album chart on November 12, 1955, peaked at No. 2, and remained on the chart for 12 weeks.

AllMusic gave the album a rating of four-and-a-half stars. Reviewer Greg Adams called it one of Gleason's "jazzier" efforts but concludes it "isn't quite mood music or jazz -- it falls somewhere in between, with the potential to appeal to the audiences of both styles of music."

== Track listing ==
Side A

1. "There'll Be Some Changes Made" (Higgins, Edwards, Overstreet)
2. "How About You?" (Burton Lane, Ralph Freed)
3. "Crazy Rhythm" (Caesar, Meyer, Kahn)
4. "The Petite Waltz" (Joe Heyne)
5. "Don't Blame Me" (Dorothy Fields, Jimmy McHugh)
6. "You Can't Pull The Wool Over My Eyes" (Newman, Ager, Mencher)
7. "Soon" (George & Ira Gershwin)
8. "My Blue Heaven" (George Whiting, Walter Donaldson)

Side B

1. "The Lady Is A Tramp" (Richard Rodgers, Lorenz Hart)
2. "The Most Beautiful Girl In The World" (Richard Rodgers, Lorenz Hart)
3. "Who Cares" (George & Ira Gershwin)
4. "I've Got My Eyes On You" (Cole Porter)
5. "The Best Things In Life Are Free" (Desylva, Brown, Henderson)
6. "I Never Knew" (Gus Kahn, Ted FioRito)
7. "The World Is Waiting For The Sunrise" (Ernest Seitz, Eugene Lockhart)
8. "The Love Nest" Louis A. Hirsch, Otto Harbach)
