= Music to Remember Her =

Studio album by Jackie Gleason
- Released: 1955
- Genre: Mood music
- Label: Capitol

Jackie Gleason chronology
Romantic Jazz (1955)	Music to Remember Her (1955)	Music to Change Her Mind (1956)

Music to Remember Her, also known as Jackie Gleason Presents Music to Remember Her, is a studio album by television personality, Jackie Gleason. It was released in 1955 on Capitol Records (catalog no. W-570). Gleason conducted the orchestra.

Music to Remember Her debuted on the Billboard magazine pop album chart on March 5, 1955, peaked at No. 5, and remained on the chart for 16 weeks.

AllMusic gave the album a rating of four-and-a-half stars. Reviewer Lindsay Planer found some of the tracks to be "actually quite sensitive."

== Track listing ==
Side A

1. "Ruby"
2. "Cherry"
3. "Dinah"
4. "Sweet Lorraine"
5. "Stella by Starlight"
6. "Sweet Sue, Just You"
7. "Marie"
8. "Jeannine, I Dream Of Lilac Time"

Side B

1. "Louise”
2. "Tangerine"
3. "Marilyn" (Jackie Gleason)
4. "Diane"
5. "Charmaine"
6. "Laura"
7. "Jo Anne"
8. "Rose Anne"
