= Johnny Maddox =

American ragtime pianist (1927–2018)

- Born: John Sheppard Maddox Jr. August 4, 1927; Gallatin, Tennessee, U.S.
- Died: November 27, 2018 (aged 91) Gallatin, Tennessee, U.S.
- Genres: Jazz, ragtime
- Occupation: Musician
- Instrument: Piano

John Sheppard Maddox Jr. (August 4, 1927 – November 27, 2018) was an American ragtime pianist, historian, and collector of music memorabilia.

== Life and career ==
Maddox was born in 1927 in Gallatin, Tennessee. His interest in the ragtime era was fueled by his great-aunt Zula Cothron. She played with an all-girls' orchestra at the 1904 Louisiana Purchase Exposition in St. Louis and later played in vaudeville. Maddox studied classical music for nineteen years with Margaret Neal and Prudence Simpson Dresser, who studied in Europe for a short time with Franz Liszt. One of his teachers of popular music, Lela Donoho, accompanied silent movies in his hometown of Gallatin, Tennessee. He played his first public concert when he was five and began his professional career in 1939 playing with a local dance band, the Rhythmasters, led by J. O. "Temp" Templeton.

Around 1946, Maddox started working for his friend Randy Wood at Randy's Record Shop in Gallatin, where Wood founded Dot Records. Maddox's first single, "St. Louis Tickle" with "Crazy Bone Rag" on the flip side (recorded May 19, 1950), sold over 22,000 copies in only a few weeks. He became the first successful artist on Dot, and his instant success helped build Dot into one of the most popular labels of the 1950s. He signed with MCA and began touring nightclubs across the country. In Dallas, Texas, he appeared with Sophie Tucker; in Las Vegas with Billy Eckstine and Elvis Presley; in Miami, Florida, with Eddy Arnold and the Duke of Paducah; and in Detroit, Michigan, with Pat Flowers, Dorothy Donegan, and Lawrence Welk. His first record to sell over a million copies was probably "San Antonio Rose" by Bob Wills. Another one of his most popular early records was "In the Mood", and he performed the song on The Pee Wee King Show in February 1953.

After hearing him play in 1952, the "Father of the Blues", W. C. Handy, called Maddox "the white boy with the colored fingers".

In 1954, Maddox was declared the Number One Jukebox Artist in America by the MOA (Music Operators of America). In January 1955, he recorded "The Crazy Otto Medley", which was composed of Lou Busch's "Ivory Rag", several German folk songs, and Irving Berlin's "Play a Simple Melody". The medley was originally recorded on the Polydor label by German pianist Fritz Schulz-Reichel under the pseudonym "Otto der Schrage". Disc jockey Bill Randle of WERE in Cleveland, Ohio, suggested to Randy Wood that Maddox record a version of the song and use "The Crazy Otto Medley" as the title. Maddox's record was on the Billboard charts for twenty weeks, peaking at #2 for seven weeks, and became the first million-selling all-piano record, eventually selling more than two million copies. Schulz-Reichel then came to the United States and recorded for Decca under the name "Crazy Otto". The reference to "Crazy Otto" in the Grateful Dead song "Ramble on Rose" is a reference to Maddox's hit record. Maddox performed The Jack Paar Show in March 1955 and played "The Crazy Otto Medley" on Milton Berle's Texaco Star Theatre on May 31, 1955. He appeared with two other pianists, Hazel Scott and Joe Loco, on Patti Page's program The Big Record in November 1956. One of his later appearances was on The Soupy Sales Show.

Maddox continued to record for Dot Records through 1967, by which time he had earned nine gold singles, and his total sales were over eleven million. One of the highlights of his was performing twice at New York's Stork Club, where he appeared on live television with Teresa Brewer. At the annual Hillbilly Homecoming in Maryville, Tennessee, in 1957, he worked with an up-and-coming young singer named Patsy Cline. Maddox toured fairgrounds across the country in the late 1950s and early '60s with Swenson's Thrillcade, playing on a piano placed on the back of a pickup truck that was lifted by a hydraulic lift as high as fifteen feet. His longest professional engagement was at the Red Slipper Room in Denver, Colorado's Cherry Creek Inn, where he played for seventeen years. Maddox befriended many more musicians and performers from the ragtime and vaudeville days in his travels, including Glover Compton, Butterbeans and Susie, Candy Candido, Ted Lewis, Gus Van, Glenn Rowell, and Joe Jordan.

Maddox began collecting antique sheet music, 78s, cylinders, piano rolls, photographs, and more at a very young age. He sold much of his first collection to Brigham Young University when he moved to Bad Ischl, Austria, around 1970. Tired of life on the road, he attempted to retire from show business. Soon, however, he was back performing in the United States and began a long residency at Il Porto Ristorante in Old Town Alexandria, Virginia.

He retired in 1992 but was then coaxed to perform at the Historic Strater Hotel's Diamond Belle Saloon in Durango, Colorado, where he played from 1996 to 2012. He also mentored ragtime pianist Adam Swanson in his later life. He owned one of the largest collections of popular sheet music in the world, likely totaling near 100,000 pieces. He died on November 27, 2018, at the age of 91.

== Awards and honors ==
He is the only ragtime pianist to earn a star on the Hollywood Walk of Fame, which was included when construction on the Walk of Fame began.

A caricature of Maddox was placed in the main dining room of the Hollywood Brown Derby Restaurant next to Paul Whiteman, Rudy Vallee, Hank Williams, and Bill Haley.
