= Love (Your Spell Is Everywhere) =

1929 song

Song
- Published: 1929
- Genre: Traditional pop
- Composer(s): Edmund Goulding
- Lyricist(s): Elsie Janis

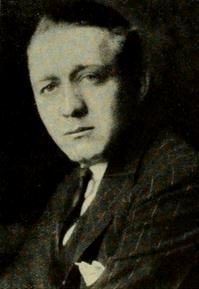
Composer Edmund Goulding

"Love (Your Spell Is Everywhere)", also called "Love, Your Spell Is Everywhere", "Love (Your Magic Spell Is Everywhere)" or "Love Your Spell Is Everywhere", is a traditional pop song first published in 1929, written by Elsie Janis with music composed by Edmund Goulding.

== History ==
The song was first performed by James Melton and Gloria Swanson in 1929 and featured in the talkie The Trespasser. It was later covered by Johnny Mathis, Dean Martin, Kenny Burrell, Sammy Davis Jr., Curtis Fuller, Jackie Gleason, Peggy Lee, Johnny Douglas and Living Strings, Harry James and Henri René.

A 1964 episode of The Red Skelton Hour was called "Love, Your Tragic Smell Is Everywhere or A Hat Full of Hate", a parody of the song title.

== See also ==
- List of 1920s jazz standards
