= Music to Make You Misty =

Studio album by Jackie Gleason
- Released: 1953
- Genre: Mood music
- Label: Capitol

Jackie Gleason chronology
Lover's Rhapsody (1953)	Music to Make You Misty (1953)	Tawny (1953)

Music to Make You Misty, also known as Jackie Gleason Presents Music to Make You Misty, is a studio album by television personality Jackie Gleason. It was released in 1953 on Capitol Records. It was originally issued as a 10-inch extended play record with eight songs. It was reissued several months later as an album with eight additional songs. The musicians featured on the album included Bobby Hackett on trumpet and Toots Mondello on alto sax.

Music to Make You Misty reached No. 2 on Billboard magazine's pop album chart in January and February 1954.

AllMusic gave the album a rating of three stars.

== Original track listing ==
Side A

1. "Say It Isn't So" (Irving Berlin)
2. "I Guess I'll Have To Change My Plan" (Arthur Schwartz, Howard Dietz)
3. "It Happened In Monterey" (Billy Rose, Mabel Wayne)
4. "It All Depends On You" (DeSylva, Brown and Henderson)

Side B

1. "The Man I Love" (George & Ira Gershwin)
2. "Mickey" (Harry Williams, Neil Moret)
3. "I Hadn't Anyone Till You" (Ray Noble)
4. "You Were Meant For Me" (Arthur Freed, Nacio Herb Brown)

== Expanded track listing ==
Side A

1. "It All Depends On You" (DeSylva, Brown and Henderson)
2. "The Man I Love" (George & Ira Gershwin)
3. "Mickey" (Harry Williams, Neil Moret)
4. "I Hadn't Anyone Till You" (Ray Noble)
5. "When Your Lover Has Gone" (E.A. Swan)
6. "Tenderly" (Jack Lawrence, Walter Goss)
7. "I'm Thru with Love" (Livingston, Kahn, Malneck)
8. "Dark Is the Night (C'Est Fin)" (Nicholas Brodszky, Sammy Cahn)

Side B

1. "Say It Isn't So" (Irving Berlin)
2. "I Guess I'll Have To Change My Plan" (Arthur Schwartz, Howard Dietz)
3. "It Happened In Monterey" (Billy Rose, Mabel Wayne)
4. "You Were Meant For Me" (Arthur Freed, Nacio Herb Brown)
5. "Prelude to a Kiss" (Ellington, Gordon, Mills)
6. "You're the One I Care For" (Lown, Gray, Link)
7. "Jealous" (Finch, Little, Malie)
8. "Thinking of You" (Paul Ash, Walter Donaldson)
