= Tawny (album) =

Studio album by Jackie Gleason
- Released: 1954
- Genre: Mood music
- Label: Capitol

Jackie Gleason chronology
Music to Make You Misty (1954)	Tawny (1954)	And Awaaay We Go! (1954)

Tawny, also known as Jackie Gleason Presents Tawny, is a studio album by television personality, Jackie Gleason. Gleason conducted an orchestra performing songs in music from Gleason's musical and dance production of "Tawny". It was released in 1954 on Capitol Records (catalog no. H-471).

Tawny reached No. 1 on Billboard magazine's pop album chart in March 1954.

== Original track listing ==
Side A

1. "The Girl"
2. "The Boy"
3. "The Dance"
4. "The Affair"

Side B

1. "Little Girl"
2. "I Cover the Waterfront"
3. "Some Day"
4. "If I Had You"
