= Lover's Rhapsody =

Studio album by Jackie Gleason
- Released: March 16, 1953
- Genre: Mood music
- Label: Capitol

Jackie Gleason chronology
Music for Lovers Only (1952)	Lover's Rhapsody (1953)	Music to Make You Misty (1953)

Lover's Rhapsody, also known as Songs from Lover's Rhapsody, is a studio album by television personality, Jackie Gleason. It was released in 1953 on Capitol Records (catalog no. H-366). The musicians included Bobby Hackett on trumpet.

Lover's Rhapsody reached No. 2 on Billboard magazine's pop album chart in August and September 1953.

AllMusic gave the album a rating of three stars.

== Track listing ==
Side A

1. "Desire"
2. "Flirtation"
3. "Temptation"
4. "Enchantment"

Side B

1. "When Your Lover Has Gone"
2. "Tenderly"
3. "I'm Thru with Love"
4. "Dark Is the Night"
