= The Million Dollar Incident =

1961 television film directed by Norman Jewison

The Million Dollar Incident is a 1961 television drama directed by Norman Jewison and starring Jackie Gleason, Everett Sloane, Jack Klugman, and Peter Falk. Gleason plays himself being kidnapped and held for ransom. The film begins with Gleason telling the story, shown in flashback, to Ed Sullivan in Toots Shor's bar. The TV movie is available for viewing at the Paley Center for Media in New York City and Los Angeles.
