= Lonesome Echo =

Studio album by Jackie Gleason
- Released: 1955
- Genre: Mood music
- Label: Capitol

Jackie Gleason chronology
Melancholy Serenade (1954)	Lonesome Echo (1955)	Romantic Jazz (1955)

Lonesome Echo, a.k.a. Jackie Gleason Presents Lonesome Echo is a studio album of "mood music" by television personality, Jackie Gleason. It was released in 1955 on Capitol Records (catalog no. W627). Gleason conducted an orchestra of strings that included mandolins, cellos, and domras, augmented by guitars and marimba. The solos are performed by Romeo Penque on oboe d'amore.

The album featured cover art by Salvador Dalí. Dalí described the work as follows: "The first effect is that of anguish, of space, and of solitude. Secondly, the fragility of the wings of a butterfly, projecting long shadows of late afternoon, reverberates in the landscape like an echo. The feminine element, distant and isolated, forms a perfect triangle with the music instruments and its other echo, the shell."

Lonesome Echo entered Billboard magazine's pop album chart on June 25, 1955, peaked at No. 1, and remained on the chart for 23 weeks.

AllMusic gave the album a rating of three stars. Reviewer Heather Phares described the music as "lush interpretations of standards" and noted the "striking cover artwork" by Dalí.

== Track listing ==
Side A

1. "There Must Be a Way" (Saxon, Cook, Gallop)
2. "I Don't Know Why (I Just Do)" (Fred E. Ahlert, Roy Turk)
3. "Deep Purple" (Mitchell Parish, Peter DeRose)
4. "Mad About the Boy" (Noël Coward)
5. "Someday I'll Find You" (Coward)
6. "Come Rain or Come Shine" (Harold Arlen, Johnny Mercer)
7. "The Thrill Is Gone" (Lew Brown, Ray Henderson)
8. "I Wished on the Moon" (Dorothy Parker, Ralph Rainger)

Side B

1. "How Deep Is the Ocean?" (Irving Berlin)
2. "Remember" (Berlin)
3. "Speak Low" (Kurt Weill, Ogden Nash)
4. "I Still Get a Thrill" (Benny Davis, J. Fred Coots)
5. "Darling, Je Vous Aime Beaucoup" (Anna Sosenko)
6. "I'm Always Chasing Rainbows" (Harry Carroll, Joseph McCarthy)
7. "A Garden in the Rain" (Carroll Gibbons, James Dyrenforth)
8. "Dancing on the Ceiling" (Richard Rodgers, Lorenz Hart)
