= And Awaaay We Go! =

Studio album by Jackie Gleason
- Released: May 1954
- Genres: Comedy, mood music
- Label: Capitol

Jackie Gleason chronology
| Tawny (1954) | And Awaaay We Go! (1954) | Music, Martinis and Memories (1954) |

And Awaaay We Go! is an album by television personality, Jackie Gleason. It was released in May 1954 on Capitol Records (catalog no. H-511). Unlike his prior albums of mood music, the album presented a mix of mood music and comedy routines featuring characters made popular in Gleason's television appearances, including The Poor Soul, Reggie Van Gleason III, Joe the Bartender, Loudmouth Charlie Bratton, and Fenwick Babbitt.

And Awaaay We Go! became one of the best selling popular albums on Billboard magazine's pop album chart in June 1954.

Upon its release, Billboard called it a "dan-dan-dandy set". AllMusic later gave the album a rating of three stars. Reviewer Richie Unterberger opined that the comedy routines decidedly outshined the music.

== Original track listing ==
Side A

1. "And Away We Go!"
2. "The Poor Soul"
3. "You're a Dan-Dan-Dandy"
4. "Reggie Van Gleason III"

Side B

1. "Hy'a Mr. Dennehy" (Jackie Gleason, John Redmond)
2. "One of These Days - Pow!"
3. "Here's Charlie"
4. "You're a Nice Man"
