= Music, Martinis and Memories =

Studio album by Jackie Gleason
- Released: August 2, 1954
- Genre: Mood music
- Label: Capitol

Jackie Gleason chronology
And Awaaay We Go! (1954)	Music, Martinis and Memories (1954)	Melancholy Serenade (1954)

Music, Martinis, and Memories is a studio album by television personality Jackie Gleason. It was originally released in 1954 on Capitol Records. The orchestration consists of violins playing the melody while Bobby Hackett plays trumpet.

Music, Martinis and Memories reached No. 1 on Billboard magazine's pop album chart in October 1954.

AllMusic gave the album a rating of four stars. Reviewer Greg Adams described the music as "plain vanilla" and lacking in depth, serving as "fine dinner music" but failing to "hold the listener's attention when brought to the foreground."

== Track listing ==
Side A

1. "Once in a While" (Bud Green, Michael Edwards)
2. "I Can't Get Started" (Ira Gershwin, (Vernon Duke)
3. "I Got It Bad (and That Ain't Good)" (Duke Ellington, Paul Francis Webster)
4. "My Ideal" (Leo Robin, Newell Chase, (Richard A. Whiting)
5. "Yesterdays" (Jerome Kern, (Otto Harbach)
6. I Love You (Je T'Aime!)" (Harlan Thompson, (Harry Archer)
7. "Unforgettable (Nat King Cole song)" (Irving Gordon)
8. "How High the Moon" (Morgan Lewis, Nancy Hamilton)

Side B

1. "I'll Be Seeing You" (Irving Kahal, Sammy Fain)
2. "Shangri-La" (Matty Malneck, Robert Maxwell)
3. "I Remember You" (Johnny Mercer, Victor Schertzinger)
4. "It Could Happen to You" (James Van Heusen, Johnny Burke)
5. "Somebody Loves Me" (Ballard MacDonald, Buddy DeSylva, George Gershwin)
6. "Time on My Hands" (Harold Adamson, Mack Gordon, Vincent Youmans)
7. "The Nearness of You" (Hoagy Carmichael, Ned Washington)
8. "The Song Is Ended (but the Melody Lingers On)" (Irving Berlin)
