= Crazy Otto (album) =

Compilation album by Crazy Otto
- Released: 1955
- Label: Decca

Crazy Otto is a compilation album by German pianist Crazy Otto, released in 1955 on Decca.

== Background ==
The album was issued on LP (cat. no. DL 8113). The record's labels state: "Recorded by Deutsche Grammophon—Polydor Series." The back cover describes the album as "the first American collection of the pianist's favorite numbers."

== Critical reception ==
Professional ratings
Review scores
Source	Rating
Cosmopolitan	(favorable)

Cosmopolitan described Crazy Otto's piano as being out of tune and his arrangements as "intentionally corny" but gave a favorable review, defining the pianist's style as "a one-man revival of ragtime with an occasional new twist". "One drawback: the drums are too close to the microphone," noted the reviewer in conclusion.

== Chart performance ==
The album reached No. 1 on the LP half of Billboard's Best-Selling Popular Albums chart.

== Track listing ==
LP (Decca DL 8113)

Side 1
No.	Title	Writer(s)	Length
1.	"Glad Rag Doll"	Dougherty; Ager; Yellen
2.	"Beautiful Ohio"	Mary Earl
3.	"My Melancholy Baby"	E. Burnett; G. Norton; M. Watson
4.	"Red Sails in the Sunset"	Hugh Williams; Jimmy Kennedy
5.	"In the Mood"	Joe Garland; Andy Razaf

Side 2
No.	Title	Writer(s)	Length
1.	"Smiles"	Lee S. Roberts; J. Will Callahan
2.	"Rose of Washington Square"	James F. Hanley; Ballard MacDonald
3.	"S-H-I-N-E"	Ford Dabney; Cecil Mack; Lew Brown
4.	"Paddlin' Madelin' Home"	Harry Woods
5.	"Lights Out"	Billy Hill

== Charts ==
Chart (1955)	Peak position
US Billboard Best-Selling Popular Albums – LPs	1

== See also ==
- List of Billboard number-one albums of 1955
