= The Crazy Otto Medley =

Single by Johnny Maddox
- B-side: "Humoresque"
- Released: January 1955
- Recorded: 1954
- Genre: Ragtime
- Length: 3:02
- Label: Dot
- Songwriter: Fritz Schulz-Reichel

Johnny Maddox singles chronology
"Chicken Reel" (1955)	"The Crazy Otto Medley" (1955)	"Johnny's Medley (Spaghetti Rag / Brush Creek Rag / South / San Antonio Rose / Old Piano Roll Blues)" (1955)

"The Crazy Otto Medley" is a ragtime medley, originally arranged and recorded by the German comic performer Fritz Schulz-Reichel under the pseudonym of "Der schräge Otto" aka "Crazy Otto". The best-known version is a 1955 recording made by pianist Johnny Maddox.

The opening tune in the medley is "Ivory Rag" by Lou Busch and Jack Elliott. The closing song is "Play a Simple Melody" by Irving Berlin. The songs sandwiched in between these two are pop songs from Germany. The first of them is "In der Nacht ist der Mensch nicht gern alleine" by Franz Grothe. The second is "Das machen nur die Beine von Dolores" by Michael Jary. The third is "Was macht der alte Seemann" (Heino Gaze & Günther Schwenn).

The Maddox recording of the Crazy Otto Medley entered the Billboard charts on February 5, 1955, and spent 20 weeks, peaking at #2 for seven weeks. It also became the first million-selling ragtime record in the United States since Del Wood's "Down Yonder" in 1951, and eventually sold in excess of two million copies.

Due to its success, the Crazy Otto Medley became synonymous with Maddox in the United States, who became nicknamed "Crazy Otto", the same nickname already used by Schulz-Reichel.

The Grateful Dead song "Ramble on Rose" contains a line about Crazy Otto.
