= Fritz Schulz-Reichel =

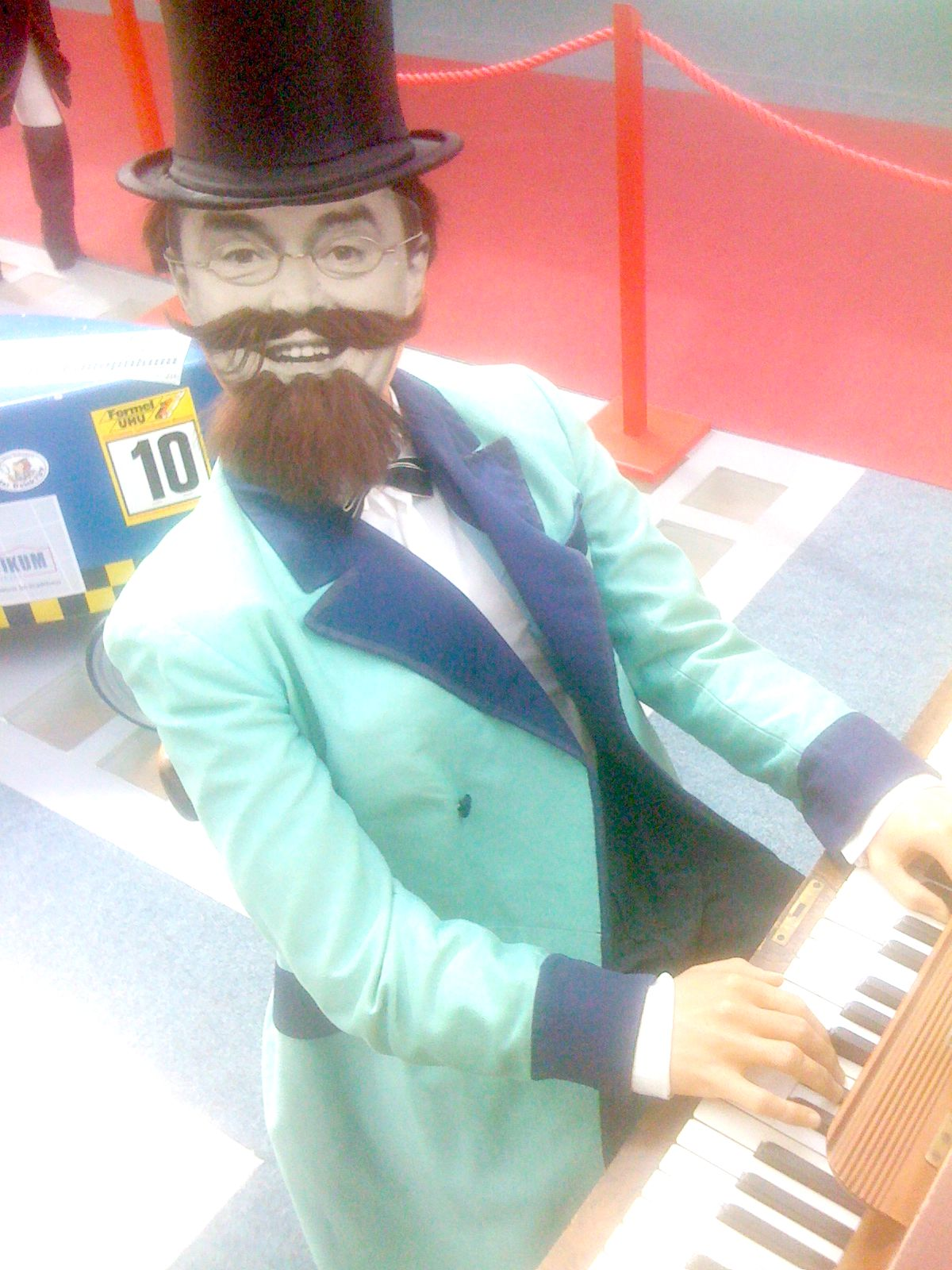

Background information
- Born: July 4, 1912; Meiningen
- Died: February 14, 1990 (aged 77) Berlin
- Genres: Pop; Jazz
- Occupation: Pianist
- Instrument: Piano
- Years active: 1955 – 1990
- Labels: Polydor; Music Parade Cetra; MGM; Decca; Brunswick

Fritz Schulz-Reichel (July 4, 1912 – February 14, 1990) was a German jazz and pop pianist.

Schulz-Reichel was born in Meiningen. His father was a classical musician, and he began playing piano at the age of six. He developed an unusual technique where he played the melody of a tune with the left hand and the rhythm with the right hand.

While he trained to be a concert pianist, he chose a career in pop music, playing light jazz and pop tunes. He invented a device called the Tipsy Wire Box, which could be attached to a piano to make it sound like an out-of-tune barrelhouse upright. (Another interpretation is that "Tipsy Wire Box" was a slang expression for the piano itself, which was merely "detuned"; that is, one of the three strings that make up each note of the main section of the piano is slightly flatted, giving the piano the characteristic sound.)

In 1953 he adopted the moniker Schräger Otto (Crazy Otto), and recorded for Deutsche Grammophon. His tunes became hits in Germany, France, England, and America; his albums were released on Decca and MGM in the U.S. and Polydor which were distributed by Philips Electrical Industries Pty. Limited in Australia. In 1955, American musician Johnny Maddox played a medley of his songs, entitled "The Crazy Otto Medley"; this went to #2 on the U.S. charts, and in the U.S. both Reichel and Maddox were subsequently known as "Crazy Otto", to some confusion.

Schulz-Reichel continued to perform live and on film, and remained a popular jazz favorite in Germany for many years.

"Crazy Otto" is referenced in the song "Ramble on Rose" written by Robert Hunter and performed by the Grateful Dead.

== Partial discography ==
- Crazy Otto (1955) – US No. 1
