= Jackie Gleason =

American comedian and actor (1916–1987)

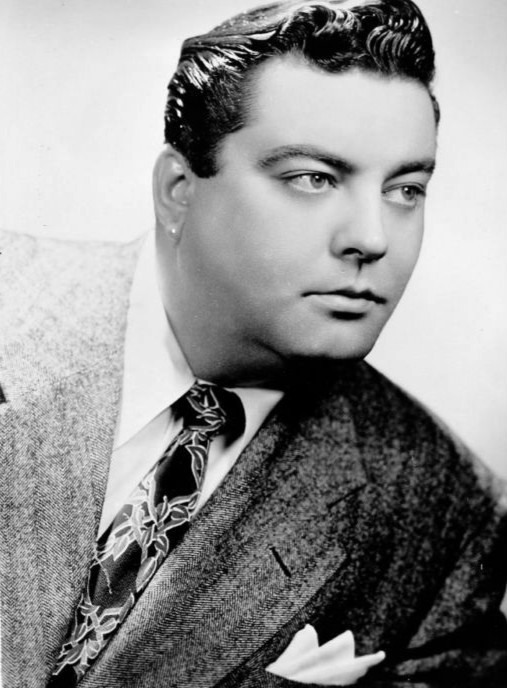
- Gleason in the 1940s
- Born: Herbert Walton Gleason Jr. February 26, 1916; New York City, U.S.
- Died: June 24, 1987 (aged 71); Lauderhill, Florida, U.S.
- Burial place: Our Lady of Mercy Catholic Cemetery; Doral, Florida, U.S.
- Occupations: Comedian; actor; musician; writer; composer; conductor
- Years active: 1935–1986
- Spouses: Genevieve Halford (m. 1936; div. 1970); Beverly McKittrick (m. 1970; div. 1975); Marilyn Taylor (m. 1975)
- Children: 2, including Linda Miller
- Relatives: Jason Patric (grandson)

Herbert John Gleason (born Herbert Walton Gleason Jr.; February 26, 1916 – June 24, 1987), known as Jackie Gleason, was an American comedian, actor, writer, and composer also known as "The Great One".

He developed a style and characters from growing up in Brooklyn, New York, and was known for his brash visual and verbal comedy, exemplified by his city bus driver character Ralph Kramden in the television series The Honeymooners. He also developed The Jackie Gleason Show, which maintained high ratings from the mid-1950s through 1970. The series originated in New York City, but filming moved to Miami Beach, Florida, in 1964 after Gleason took up permanent residence there.

Among his notable film roles were Minnesota Fats in 1961's The Hustler (co-starring with Paul Newman) and Buford T. Justice in the Smokey and the Bandit trilogy from 1977 to 1983 (co-starring Burt Reynolds).

Gleason enjoyed a prominent secondary music career during the 1950s and 1960s, producing a series of bestselling "mood music" albums. His first album Music for Lovers Only still holds the record for the longest stay on the Billboard Top Ten Charts (153 weeks), and his first ten albums sold over a million copies each. His output includes more than 20 singles, nearly 60 long-playing record albums, and more than 40 CDs.

During his career, Gleason received a nomination for an Academy Award, three Golden Globe Awards, and five Primetime Emmy Awards.

== Early life ==
Gleason was born Herbert Walton Gleason Jr. on February 26, 1916, at 364 Chauncey Street in the Stuyvesant Heights (now Bedford–Stuyvesant) section of Brooklyn. He was later baptized as "John Herbert Gleason" and grew up at 328 Chauncey Street, Apartment 1A (an address he later used for Ralph and Alice Kramden on The Honeymooners).

His parents were Herbert Walton "Herb" Gleason (1883–1964), born in New York City to an Irish father and an American mother, and Mae Agnes "Maisie" (née Kelly; 1886–1935), an Irish immigrant from Farranree, County Cork. Gleason was the younger of two children; his elder brother, Clement, died from complications of meningitis at age 14 in 1919.

Gleason remembered Clement and his father having "beautiful handwriting". He watched his father work at the family's kitchen table, writing insurance policies in the evenings. On the night of December 14, 1925, Gleason's father disposed of any family photos in which he appeared; just after noon on December 15, he collected his hat, coat, and paycheck, and permanently left his family and job at the insurance company. Once it became evident that he was not coming back, Mae went to work as a subway attendant for the Brooklyn–Manhattan Transit Corporation (BMT).

After his father abandoned the family, young Gleason began hanging around with a local gang, hustling pool. He attended P.S. 73 Elementary School in Brooklyn, John Adams High School in Queens, and Bushwick High School in Brooklyn. Gleason became interested in performing after being part of a class play; he quit school before graduating and got a job that paid $4 per night (equivalent to $99 in 2025) as master of ceremonies at a theater. Other jobs he held at that time included pool hall worker, stunt driver, and carnival barker.

Gleason and his friends made the rounds of the local theaters; he put an act together with one of his friends, and the pair performed on an amateur night at the Halsey Theater, where Gleason replaced his friend Sammy Birch as master of ceremonies. He performed the same duties twice a week at the Folly Theater.

Gleason was 19 when his mother died in 1935 from complications of sepsis from a large neck carbuncle that young Jackie had tried to lance. He had nowhere to go and 36 cents to his name. The family of his first girlfriend, Julie Dennehy, offered to take him in; Gleason, however, was headstrong and insisted that he was going into the heart of the city.

His friend Birch made room for him in the hotel room he shared with another comedian. Birch also told him of a week-long gig in Reading, Pennsylvania, which would pay $19—more money than Gleason could imagine (equivalent to $440 in 2025). The booking agent advanced his bus fare for the trip against his salary, granting Gleason his first job as a professional comedian. Following this, he would always have regular work in small clubs.

== Career ==
Gleason worked his way up to larger clubs in Manhattan, first Leon and Eddie's and then Jack White's madcap Club 18, where insulting the patrons was the order of the day. Gleason greeted noted skater Sonja Henie by handing her an ice cube and saying, "Okay, now do something."

"He has an uncanny instinct for hauling willing laughs from paying guests," reported a newspaper columnist in 1941. "His unsmiling, watchful countenance reminds one of a portly Romeo being rebuffed. Audiences instinctively trust him for laughs and are rarely let down. The man can even insult people and make them like it."

By age 24, Gleason began appearing in motion pictures, under the name Jackie C. Gleason (the middle initial standing for Clement, in tribute to his late brother). When director Lloyd Bacon visited the Club 18, Gleason took him aside and asked for a chance in pictures.

Gleason then took the nightclub floor and began heckling Bacon, which convinced the director to bring Gleason to Hollywood. Gleason signed with Warner Bros. (at $250 a week) for Bacon's Navy Blues (1941) with Ann Sheridan and Martha Raye. Gleason's other major Warner credit was the Humphrey Bogart feature All Through the Night (1942), which also featured a young Phil Silvers. Warners cast Gleason in four more films of diminishing importance; one of them, Lady Gangster (1942) had Gleason as a getaway-car driver for a gang of bank bandits.

In the wake of Abbott and Costello, most of the movie studios tried to imitate the team's military comedies. Warners loaned Gleason to Columbia Pictures, where he was paired with nightclub and movie comic Jack Durant for the Army comedy Tramp, Tramp, Tramp (1942). Gleason accepted another loan-out to Twentieth Century-Fox, where Gleason played Glenn Miller's bass player in Orchestra Wives (1942). He had a modest part as an actor's agent in the 1942 Betty Grable–Harry James musical Springtime in the Rockies. Warners had no further plans for Gleason and did not renew his contract.

Gleason had supplemented his movie salary by signing a $150-a-week deal to appear at Maxie Rosenbloom's popular nightclub. "He was a smash hit," wrote biographer W. J. Weatherby, "but none of the Hollywood executives who congratulated him offered him a movie role worthy of his talent." At the end of 1942, Gleason and Lew Parker led a large cast of entertainers in the roadshow production of Olsen and Johnson's New 1943 Hellzapoppin. He also became known for hosting all-night parties in his hotel suite; the hotel soundproofed his suite out of consideration for its other guests.

"Anyone who knew Jackie Gleason in the 1940s", wrote CBS historian Robert Metz, "would tell you The Fat Man would never make it. His pals at Lindy's watched him spend money as fast as he soaked up the booze." Rodney Dangerfield wrote that he witnessed Gleason purchasing marijuana in the 1940s.

Gleason was initially exempt from military service during World War II because he was a father of two. However, in 1943, the U. S. Army started drafting men with children. When Gleason reported to his induction, doctors discovered that his broken left arm had healed crooked (the area between his thumb and forefinger was nerveless and numb), that a pilonidal cyst existed at the end of his coccyx, and that he was 100 pounds overweight. Gleason was, therefore, classified 4-F and rejected for military service.

During an acute employment slump in late 1943, Gleason took the only job he could get: a guest shot on NBC's radio show The Chamber Music Society of Lower Basin Street, a hot-jazz jam session. Gleason was that week's "intermission commentator" and delivered a comic monologue about a girl who ran off with a trumpet player. He collected $350 for the appearance. As W. J. Weatherby related, "There were so many phone calls praising it as the funniest program listeners had ever heard that Jackie was invited back. 'Wait till I'm that desperate again,' he said."

Gleason's first significant recognition as an entertainer came on Broadway when he appeared in the hit musical Follow the Girls (1944), starring singer Gertrude Niesen and comic dancer Tim Herbert.

=== Early television ===
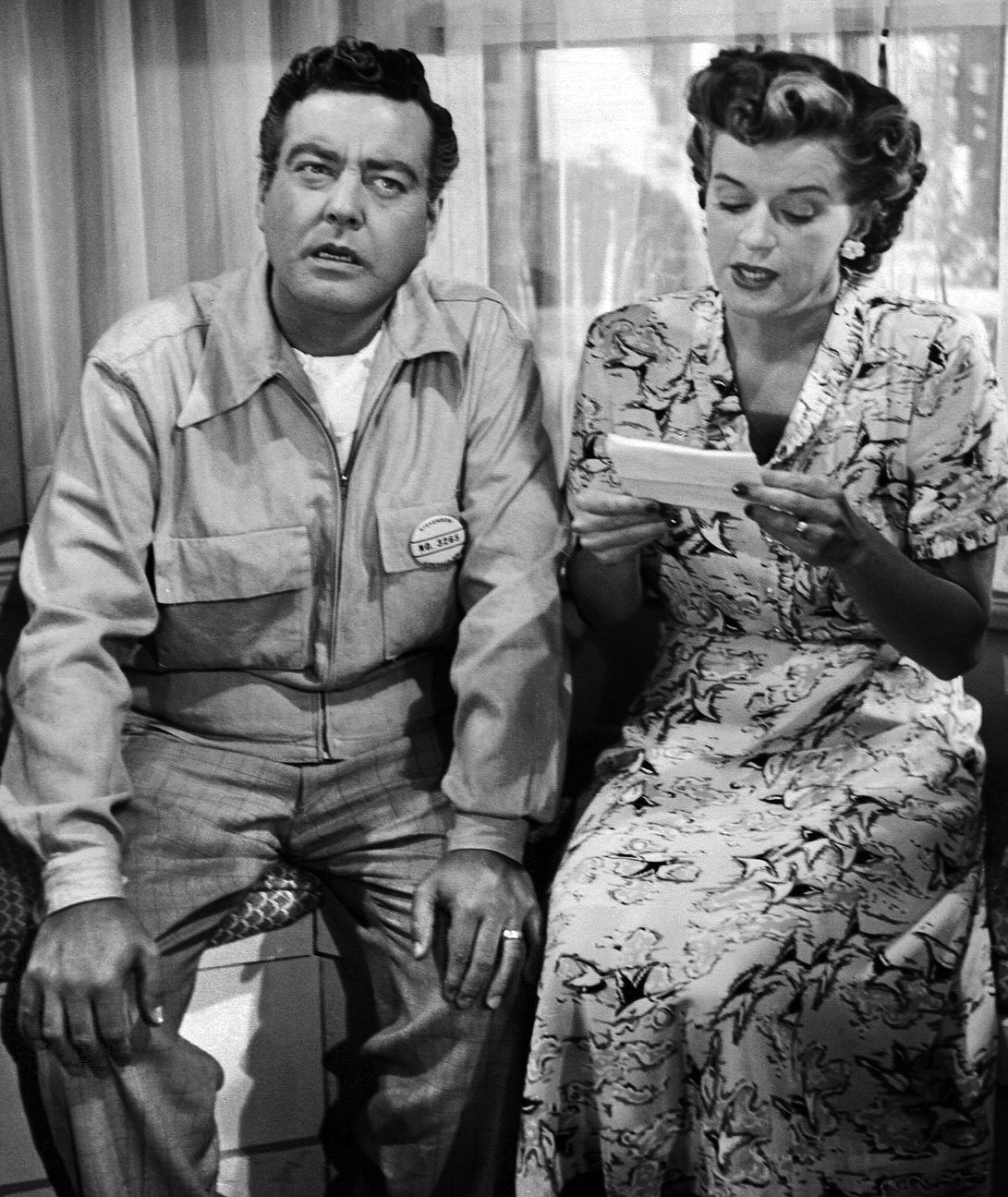
Gleason and Rosemary DeCamp as Chester and Peg Riley in The Life of Riley

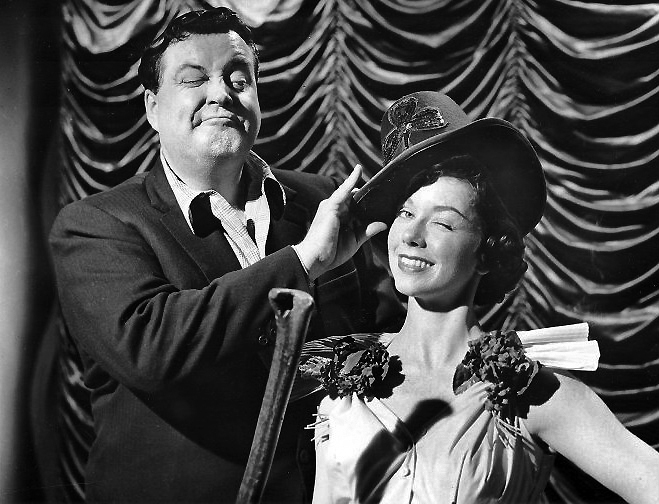
Gleason and Margaret Jeanne (of the June Taylor dancers) get ready for St. Patrick's Day 1955.

Gleason's big break occurred in 1949 when, working nightclubs and earning the attention of New York City's inner circle, he landed work with the fledgling DuMont Television Network. His first role with DuMont was the role of blunt but softhearted aircraft worker Chester A. Riley for the first television version of the radio comedy The Life of Riley, replacing William Bendix, who was unable to take the role due to contractual issues. Despite positive reviews, the show was canceled after one year, in part to DuMont's substantial disadvantages. (Bendix did resume the role beginning in 1953 for a more successful five-year series.)

As Gleason's time on The Life of Riley ended in 1950, DuMont's Cavalcade of Stars variety hour in 1950 had an opening when that show's host Jerry Lester jumped to NBC to host the first late-night comedy/variety series Broadway Open House. Comedy writer Harry Crane, whom Gleason knew from his days as a stand-up comedian in New York, recommended Gleason for the job. The program initially had rotating hosts; Gleason was first offered two weeks at $750 per week. The offer was extended to four weeks when he responded that this arrangement would not be worth the train trip to New York. Gleason returned to New York for the show and soon became permanent host.

He framed the acts with splashy dance numbers, developed sketch characters he would refine over the next decade, and became enough of a presence that CBS wooed him to its network in 1952.

Renamed The Jackie Gleason Show, the program became the country's second-highest-rated television show during the 1954–55 season. Gleason amplified the show with even splashier opening dance numbers inspired by Busby Berkeley's screen dance routines and featuring the precision-choreographed June Taylor Dancers. Following the dance performance, he would do an opening monologue.

Then, accompanied by "a little travelin' music" ("That's a Plenty", a Dixieland classic from 1914), he would shuffle toward the wings, clapping his hands and shouting, "And awaaay we go!" The phrase became one of his trademarks, along with "How sweet it is!" (which he used in reaction to almost anything). Theona Bryant, a former Powers Girl, became Gleason's "And awaaay we go" girl. Ray Bloch was Gleason's first music director, followed by Sammy Spear, who stayed with him through the 1960s; Gleason often kidded with his music directors during his opening monologues. He continued developing comic characters, including:

- Reginald Van Gleason III, a top-hatted millionaire with a taste for both the good life and fantasy;
- Rudy the Repairman, boisterous and boorish;
- Joe the Bartender, gregarious and with friendly words for the never-seen Mr. Dennehy (who was always the first one at the bar);
- The Poor Soul, a silent character who could (and often did) come to grief in the least-expected places (or demonstrated gratitude at such gifts as being allowed to share a newspaper on a subway);
- Rum Dum, a character with a brush-like mustache who often stumbled around as though drunk and confused;
- Fenwick Babbitt, a friendly, addle-headed young man usually depicted working at various jobs and invariably failing;
- Charlie Bratton, a loudmouth who frequently picked on the mild-mannered Clem Finch (portrayed by Art Carney, a future Honeymooners co-star);
- Stanley R. Sogg, a pitchman who usually appeared on commercials during late-night TV movies, often selling items that came with extras or bonuses (the ultimate inducement was a 100-pound wedge of "Mother Fletcher's Fatchamara's Matzoroni" cheese); and
- The Bachelor, a silent character (accompanied by the song "Somebody Loves Me") doing everyday things in an unusually lazy (or makeshift) way.

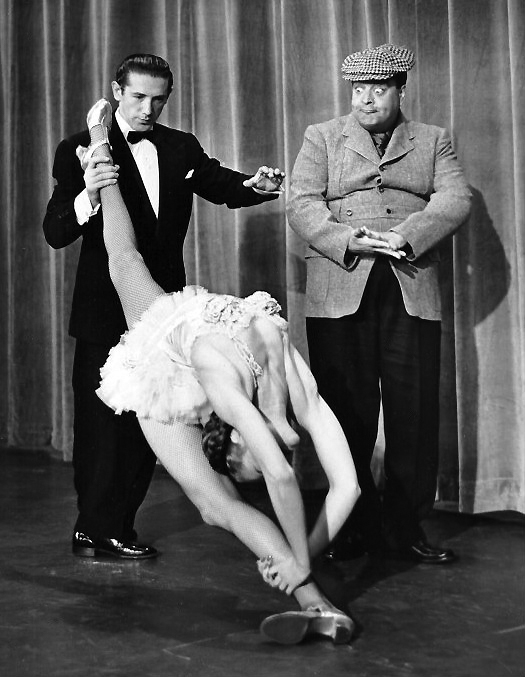
Gleason as the Poor Soul on Toast of the Town in 1954

In a 1985 interview Gleason explained how some of his invented comic characters were associated with his youth in Brooklyn. The Mr. Dennehy whom Joe the Bartender greets is a tribute to Gleason's first love, Julie Dennehy. The character of The Poor Soul was drawn from an assistant manager of an outdoor theater he frequented.

When one of Gleason's biographers likened him to Charlie Chaplin, Gleason asked, "Couldn't you compare me to Buster Keaton? Chaplin only plays one role, but Buster Keaton had a whole group of fantastic characters -- fantastic, but earthbound, too."

Gleason disliked rehearsing. Using photographic memory he read the script once, then watched a rehearsal with his co-stars and stand-in and shot the show later that day. When he made mistakes, he often blamed the cue cards.

==== The Honeymooners ====
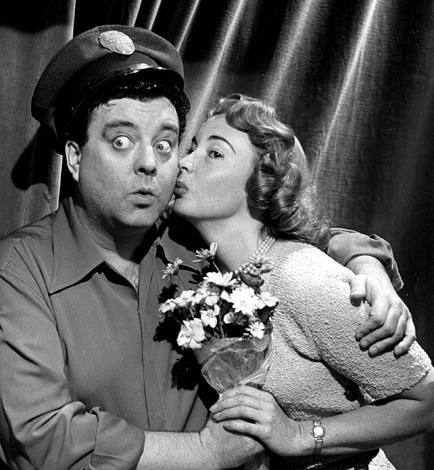
Gleason as Ralph Kramden with Audrey Meadows as Alice, circa 1955

Gleason's most famous character by far was blustery bus driver Ralph Kramden. Drawn mainly from Gleason's harsh Brooklyn childhood, the Ralph Kramden sketches became known as The Honeymooners. The show was based on Ralph's many get-rich-quick schemes, his ambition, his antics with his best friend and neighbor, scatterbrained sewer worker Ed Norton, and clashes with his sensible wife, Alice, who typically pulled Ralph's head down from the clouds.

Gleason developed catchphrases he used on The Honeymooners, such as threats to Alice: "One of these days, Alice, pow! right in the kisser" and "Bang! Zoom! To the Moon, Alice, to the Moon!"

The Honeymooners originated from a sketch Gleason was developing with his show's writers. He said he had an idea he wanted to enlarge: a skit with a smart, quiet wife and her very vocal husband. He described that while the couple had their fights, underneath it all, they loved each other. Titles for the sketch were tossed around until someone came up with The Honeymooners.

The Honeymooners first appeared on Cavalcade of Stars on October 5, 1951, with Carney in a guest appearance as a cop (Norton did not appear until a few episodes later) and character actress Pert Kelton as Alice. Darker and fiercer than the milder later version with Audrey Meadows as Alice, the sketches proved popular with critics and viewers. In these early episodes with Kelton playing Alice, Gleason's frustrated bus driver character had a battleaxe of a wife, and the arguments between them were harrowingly realistic; when Meadows (who was 15 years younger than Kelton) took over the role after Kelton was blacklisted, the tone of the episodes softened considerably.

When Gleason moved to CBS, Kelton was left behind; her name had been published in Red Channels, a book that listed and described reputed communists (and communist sympathizers) who worked in television and radio, and CBS did not want to hire her. Gleason reluctantly let her be removed from the cast; the reason was covered up by telling the media that she had "heart trouble".

At first, Gleason turned down Meadows as Kelton's replacement. Meadows wrote in her memoir that after her unsuccessful audition, she frumped herself up and slipped back in to audition again to convince Gleason that she could handle the role of a frustrated (but loving) working-class wife. Rounding out the cast, Joyce Randolph played Trixie, Ed Norton's wife. Elaine Stritch had played the role of a tall and attractive blonde in the first sketch but was quickly replaced by Randolph. Comedy writer Leonard Stern always felt The Honeymooners was more than sketch material and persuaded Gleason to make it into a full-hour-long episode.

In 1955 Gleason gambled on making it a separate series entirely. The result was the "Classic 39" episodes, which finished 19th in the ratings during their only season. They were filmed with a new DuMont process, Electronicam. Like kinescopes, it preserved a live performance on film; unlike kinescopes (which were screenshots), the film was of higher quality and comparable to a motion picture. Using this higher-quality video process turned out to be Gleason's most prescient move. A decade later, he aired the half-hour Honeymooners in syndicated reruns that began to build a loyal and growing audience, making the show a television icon. Its popularity was such that in 2000, a life-sized statue of Jackie Gleason, in uniform as bus driver Ralph Kramden, was installed outside the Port Authority Bus Terminal in New York City.

Gleason returned to a live show format for 1956–57, with short and long versions, including hour-long musicals. Ten years later, these musical presentations were reprised in color, with Sheila MacRae and Jane Kean as Alice and Trixie.

Audrey Meadows reappeared for one black-and-white remake of the '50s sketch "The Adoption," telecast January 8, 1966. Ten years later, she rejoined Gleason and Carney (with Jane Kean replacing Joyce Randolph) for several TV specials (one special from 1973 was shelved).

The Jackie Gleason Show ended in June 1957. In 1959, Gleason discussed the possibility of bringing back The Honeymooners in new episodes; his dream was partially realized with a Kramden-Norton sketch on a CBS variety show in late 1960, and two more sketches on his hour-long CBS show The American Scene Magazine in 1962. Jackie Gleason and His American Scene Magazine ran from 1962 to 1966, and The Jackie Gleason Show was reprised from 1966 to 1970. The Paley Center for Media considers all iterations as one series, running from 1952 to 1970.

=== Music ===
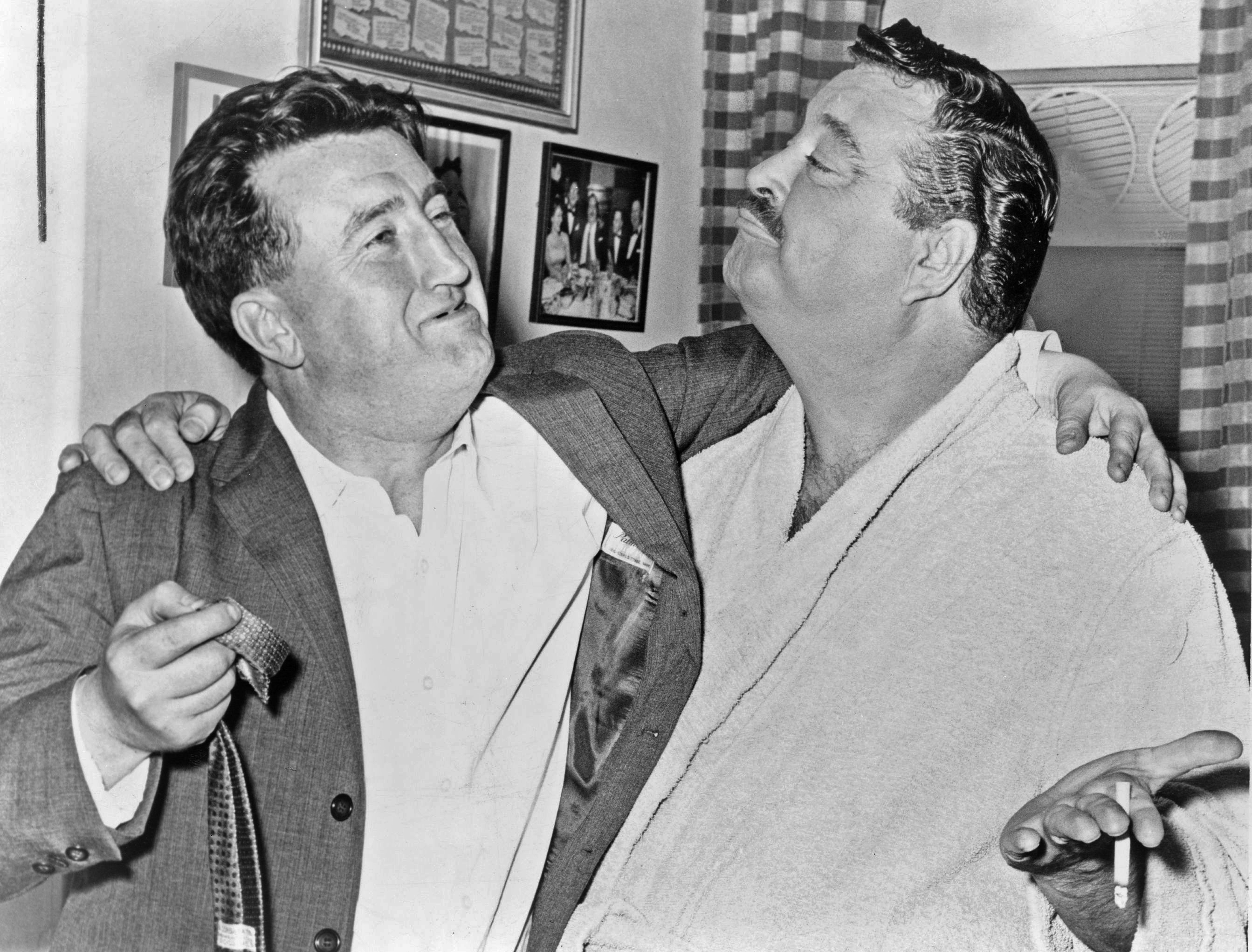
Irish writer Brendan Behan (left) with Jackie Gleason in Gleason's dressing room after a performance of Take Me Along (1960)

Throughout the 1950s and 1960s, Gleason enjoyed a prominent secondary music career, producing a series of bestselling "mood music" albums with jazz overtones for Capitol Records. Gleason believed there was a ready market for romantic instrumentals. His goal was to make "musical wallpaper that should never be intrusive, but conducive". He recalled seeing Clark Gable play love scenes in movies; the romance was, in his words, "magnified a thousand percent" by background music. Gleason reasoned, "If Gable needs strings, what about some poor schmuck from Brooklyn?"

Gleason's first album, Music for Lovers Only (Capitol, 1952), still holds the record for the longest stay on the Billboard Top Ten Charts (153 weeks), and his first ten albums sold over a million copies each. At one point, Gleason held the record for charting the most number-one albums on the Billboard 200 without charting any hits on the Top 40 of the Billboard Hot 100 singles chart.

Gleason could not read or write music; he was said to have conceived melodies in his head and described them vocally to assistants who transcribed them into musical notes. These included the well-remembered themes of both The Jackie Gleason Show ("Melancholy Serenade") and The Honeymooners ("You're My Greatest Love"). In spite of period accounts establishing his direct involvement in musical production, varying opinions have appeared over the years as to how much credit Gleason should have received for the finished products.

Biographer William A. Henry wrote in his 1992 book, The Great One: The Life and Legend of Jackie Gleason, that beyond the possible conceptualizing of many of the song melodies, Gleason had no direct involvement (such as conducting) in making the recordings. Red Nichols, a jazz great who had fallen on hard times and led one of the group's recordings, was not paid as session-leader. Cornetist and trumpeter Bobby Hackett soloed on several of Gleason's albums and was leader for seven of them. Asked late in life by musician–journalist Harry Currie in Toronto what Gleason really did at the recording sessions, Hackett replied, "He brought the checks".

But years earlier Hackett had glowingly told writer James Bacon:

Jackie knows a lot more about music than people give him credit for. I have seen him conduct a 60-piece orchestra and detect one discordant note in the brass section. He would immediately stop the music and locate the wrong note. It always amazed the professional musicians how a guy who technically did not know one note from another could do that. And he was never wrong.

The composer and arranger George Williams has been cited in various biographies as having served as ghostwriter for the majority of arrangements heard on many of Gleason's albums of the 1950s and 1960s. Williams was not given credit for his work until the early 1960s, albeit only in small print on the backs of album covers.

Gleason's lead role in the musical Take Me Along (1959–60) won him a Tony Award for Best Performance by a Leading Actor in a Musical.

=== Return to television ===
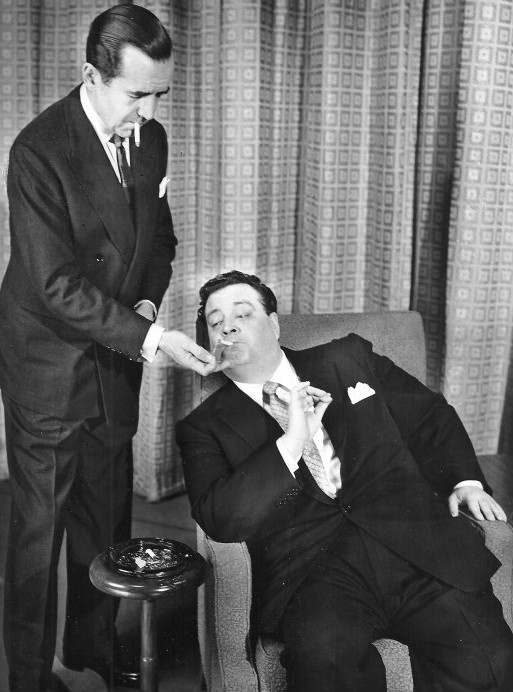
Edward R. Murrow and Gleason when the comedian was the subject of an interview on Person to Person in 1956

In 1956 Gleason revived his original variety hour (including The Honeymooners), winning a Peabody Award. He abandoned the show in 1957 when his ratings for the season came in at No. 29 and the network "suggested" he needed a break. He returned in 1958 with a half-hour show featuring Buddy Hackett, which did not catch on.

In addition to his salary and royalties, CBS paid for Gleason's Peekskill, New York, mansion "Round Rock Hill". Set on six acres, the architecturally noteworthy complex included a round main home, guest house, and storage building. It took Gleason two years to design the house, which was completed in 1959. Gleason sold the home when he relocated to Miami.

In October 1960 Gleason and Carney briefly returned for a Honeymooners sketch on a TV special. His next foray into television was the game show You're in the Picture, which was canceled after a disastrously received premiere episode but was followed the next week by a broadcast of Gleason's humorous half-hour apology, which was much better appreciated. For the rest of its scheduled run, the game show was replaced by a talk show named The Jackie Gleason Show.

In 1962 Gleason resurrected his variety show with more splashiness and a new hook: a fictitious general-interest magazine called The American Scene Magazine, through which Gleason trotted out his old characters in new scenarios, including two new Honeymooners sketches. He also added another catchphrase to the American vernacular, first uttered in the 1963 film Papa's Delicate Condition: "How sweet it is!" The Jackie Gleason Show: The American Scene Magazine was a hit that continued for four seasons. Each show began with Gleason delivering a monologue and commenting on the attention-getting outfits of band leader Sammy Spear. Then the "magazine" features would be trotted out, from Hollywood gossip (reported by comedian Barbara Heller) to news flashes (played for laughs with a stock company of second bananas, chorus girls and dwarfs).

Comedienne Alice Ghostley occasionally appeared as a downtrodden tenement resident sitting on her front step and listening to boorish boyfriend Gleason for several minutes. After the boyfriend took his leave, the smitten Ghostley would exclaim, "I'm the luckiest girl in the world!" Veteran comics Johnny Morgan, Sid Fields, and Hank Ladd were occasionally seen opposite Gleason in comedy sketches. Helen Curtis played alongside him as a singer and actress, delighting audiences with her 'Madame Plumpadore' sketches with 'Reginald Van Gleason.'

The final sketch was always set in Joe the Bartender's saloon with Joe singing "My Gal Sal" and greeting his regular customer, the unseen Mr. Dennehy (the TV audience, as Gleason spoke to the camera in this section). During the sketch Joe would tell Dennehy about an article he had read in the fictitious American Scene magazine, holding a copy across the bar. It had two covers: one featured the New York skyline and the other palm trees (after the show moved to Florida). Joe would bring out Frank Fontaine as Crazy Guggenheim, who would regale Joe with the latest adventures of his neighborhood pals and sometimes show Joe his current Top Cat comic book. Joe usually asked Crazy to sing—almost always a sentimental ballad in his fine, lilting baritone.

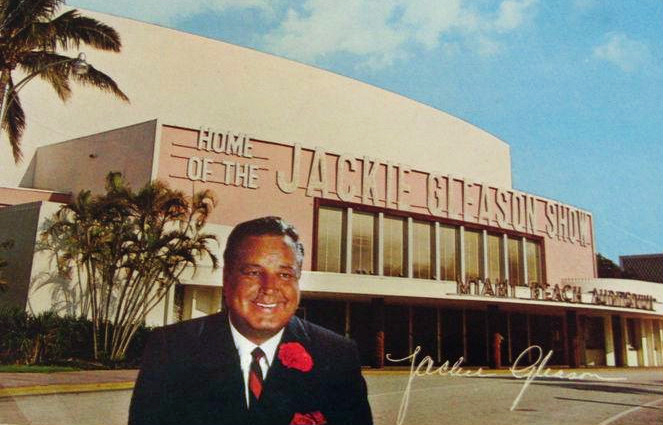
The Fillmore Miami Beach (originally the Miami Beach Municipal Auditorium), where Gleason recorded his shows after his move to Florida

Gleason revived The Honeymooners—first with Sue Ane Langdon as Alice and Patricia Wilson as Trixie for two episodes of The American Scene Magazine, then with Sheila MacRae as Alice and Jane Kean as Trixie for the 1966 series. By 1964 Gleason had moved the production from New York to Miami Beach, Florida. His closing line became, almost invariably, "As always, the Miami Beach audience is the greatest audience in the world!" In 1966, he abandoned the American Scene Magazine format and converted the show into a standard variety hour with guest performers.

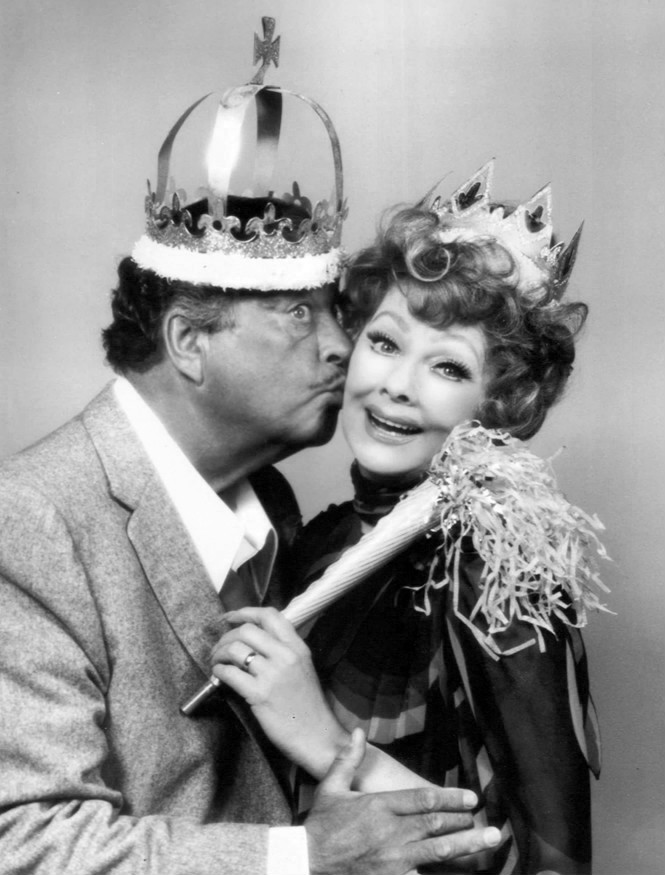
Gleason and Lucille Ball in a TV special "Tea for Two" (1975)

Gleason kicked off the 1966–1967 season with new, color episodes of The Honeymooners. Carney returned as Ed Norton, with MacRae as Alice and Kean as Trixie. The sketches were remakes of the 1957 world-tour episodes, in which Kramden and Norton win a slogan contest and take their wives to international destinations. Each of the nine episodes was a full-scale musical comedy, with Gleason and company performing original songs by Lyn Duddy and Jerry Bresler. Occasionally Gleason would devote the show to musicals with a single theme, such as college comedy or political satire, with the stars abandoning their Honeymooners roles for different character roles.

This was the show's format until its cancellation in 1970. (The exception was the 1968–1969 season, which had no hour-long Honeymooners episodes; that season, The Honeymooners was presented only in short sketches.) The musicals pushed Gleason back into the top five in ratings, but audiences soon began to decline. By its final season, Gleason's show was no longer in the top 25. In the last original Honeymooners episode aired on CBS ("Operation Protest" on February 28, 1970), Ralph encounters the youth-protest movement of the late 1960s, a sign of changing times in both television and society.

Gleason (who had signed a deal in the 1950s that included a guaranteed $100,000 annual payment for 20 years, even if he never went on the air) wanted The Honeymooners to be just a portion of his format, but CBS wanted another season of only The Honeymooners. The network had canceled a mainstay variety show hosted by Red Skelton and would cancel The Ed Sullivan Show in 1971 because they had become too expensive to produce and attracted, in the executives' opinion, too old an audience. Gleason simply stopped doing the show in 1970 and left CBS when his contract expired.

==== Honeymooners revival ====
Gleason did two Jackie Gleason Show specials for CBS after giving up his regular show in the 1970s, including Honeymooners segments and a Reginald Van Gleason III sketch in which the gregarious millionaire was portrayed as a comic drunk. When the CBS deal expired, Gleason signed with NBC. He later did a series of Honeymooners specials for ABC. Gleason hosted four ABC specials during the mid-1970s. Gleason and Carney also made a television movie, Izzy and Moe (1985), about an unusual pair of historic Federal prohibition agents in New York City who achieved an unbeatable arrest record with highly successful techniques including impersonations and humor, which aired on CBS in 1985.

In April 1974 Gleason revived several of his classic characters (including Ralph Kramden, Joe the Bartender and Reginald Van Gleason III) in a television special with Julie Andrews. In a song-and-dance routine, the two performed "Take Me Along" from Gleason's Broadway musical.

In 1985, three decades after the "Classic 39" began filming, Gleason revealed he had carefully preserved kinescopes of his live 1950s programs in a vault for future use (including Honeymooners sketches with Pert Kelton as Alice). These "lost episodes" (as they came to be called) were initially previewed at the Museum of Television and Radio in New York City, aired on the Showtime cable network in 1985, and later were added to the Honeymooners syndication package. Some of them include earlier versions of plot lines later used in the 'classic 39' episodes.

One (a Christmas episode duplicated several years later with Meadows as Alice) had all Gleason's best-known characters (Ralph Kramden, the Poor Soul, Rudy the Repairman, Reginald Van Gleason, Fenwick Babbitt and Joe the Bartender) featured in and outside of the Kramden apartment. The storyline involved a wild Christmas party hosted by Reginald Van Gleason up the block from the Kramdens' building at Joe the Bartender's place.

=== Film ===
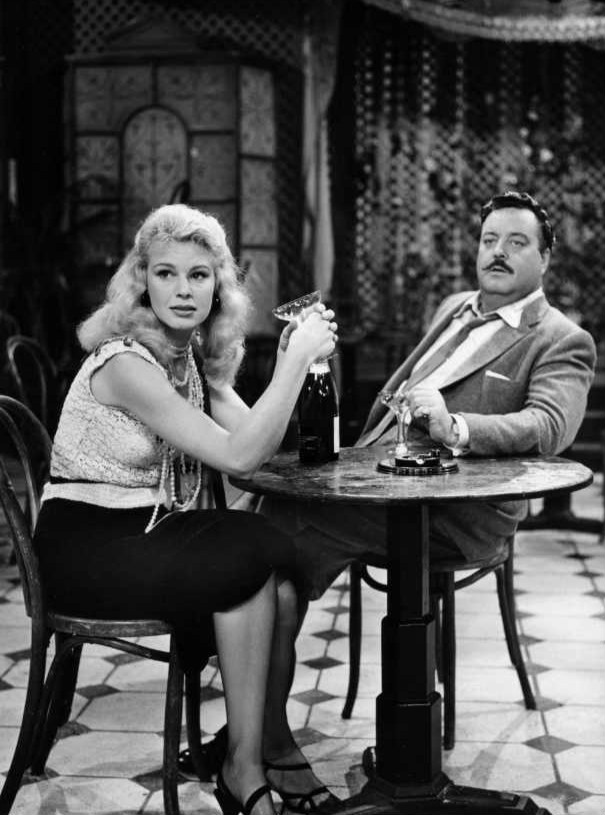
With Betsy Palmer in "The Time of Your Life" on Playhouse 90 (1958)

Gleason did not restrict his acting to comedic roles. He had also earned acclaim for live television drama performances in "The Laugh Maker" (1953) on CBS's Studio One and William Saroyan's "The Time of Your Life" (1958), which was produced as an episode of the anthology series Playhouse 90.

He was nominated for a Best Supporting Actor Academy Award for his portrayal of pool shark Minnesota Fats in The Hustler (1961), starring Paul Newman. Gleason made all his own trick pool shots. In his 1985 appearance on The Tonight Show, Gleason told Johnny Carson that he had played pool frequently since childhood, and drew from those experiences in The Hustler. He was extremely well-received as a beleaguered boxing manager in the film version of Rod Serling's Requiem for a Heavyweight (1962). Gleason played a world-weary army sergeant in Soldier in the Rain (1963), in which he received top billing over Steve McQueen.

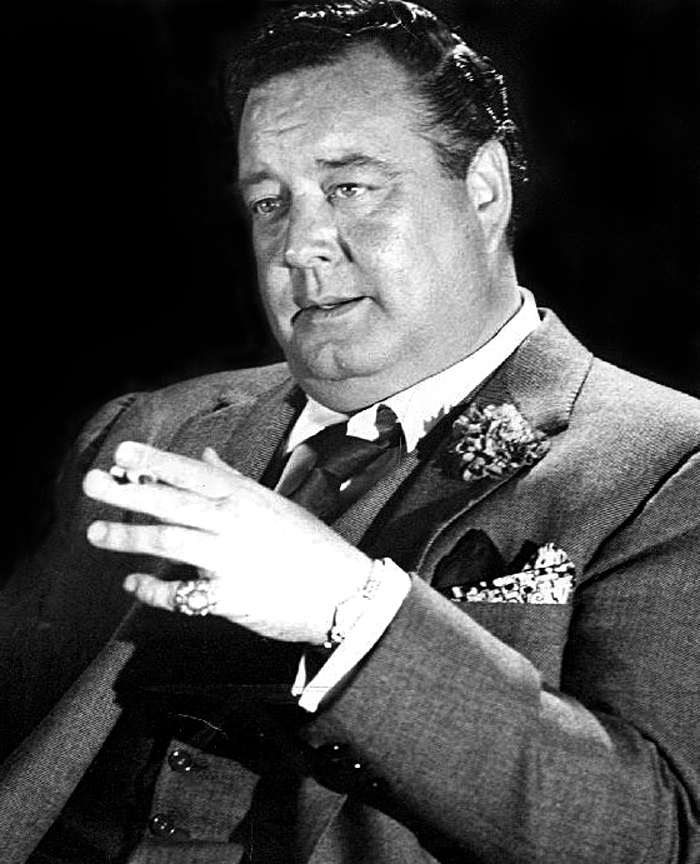
Gleason as Minnesota Fats in The Hustler (1961)

Gleason wrote, produced and starred in Gigot (1962), in which he played a poor, mute janitor who befriended and rescued a prostitute and her small daughter. It was a box office flop. But the film's script was adapted and produced as the television film The Wool Cap (2004), starring William H. Macy in the role of the mute janitor; the television film received modestly good reviews.

Gleason played the lead in the Otto Preminger-directed Skidoo (1968), considered an all-star failure. In 1969 William Friedkin wanted to cast Gleason as "Popeye" Doyle in The French Connection (1971), and Gleason wanted the part, but the studio refused because of the poor reception of Gigot and Skidoo. Instead, Gleason wound up in How to Commit Marriage (1969) with Bob Hope, as well as the movie version of Woody Allen's play Don't Drink the Water (1969). Both were unsuccessful.

Eight years passed before Gleason had another hit film. This role was the cantankerous and cursing Texas sheriff Buford T. Justice in the films Smokey and the Bandit (1977), Smokey and the Bandit II (1980) and Smokey and the Bandit Part 3 (1983). He co-starred with Burt Reynolds as the Bandit, Sally Field as Carrie (the Bandit's love interest), and Jerry Reed as Cledus "Snowman" Snow, the Bandit's truck-driving partner. Former NFL linebacker Mike Henry played his dimwitted son, Junior Justice. Gleason's gruff and frustrated demeanor and lines such as "I'm gonna barbecue yo' ass in molasses!" made the first Bandit movie a hit.

Years later, when interviewed by Larry King, Reynolds said he agreed to do the film only if the studio hired Jackie Gleason to play the part of Sheriff Buford T. Justice (the name of a real Florida highway patrolman, who knew Reynolds' father, himself a police officer). Reynolds said that director Hal Needham gave Gleason free rein to ad-lib a great deal of his dialogue and make suggestions for the film; the scene at the "Choke and Puke" was Gleason's idea. Reynolds and Needham knew Gleason's comic talent would help make the film a success, and Gleason's characterization of Sheriff Justice strengthened the film's appeal to blue-collar audiences.

During the 1980s Gleason earned positive reviews playing opposite Laurence Olivier in the HBO dramatic two-man special, Mr. Halpern and Mr. Johnson (1983). He also gave a memorable performance as wealthy businessman U.S. Bates in the comedy The Toy (1982) opposite Richard Pryor. Although the film was critically panned, Gleason and Pryor's performances were praised. His last film performance was opposite Tom Hanks in the Garry Marshall-directed Nothing in Common (1986), a success both critically and financially.

== Personal life ==
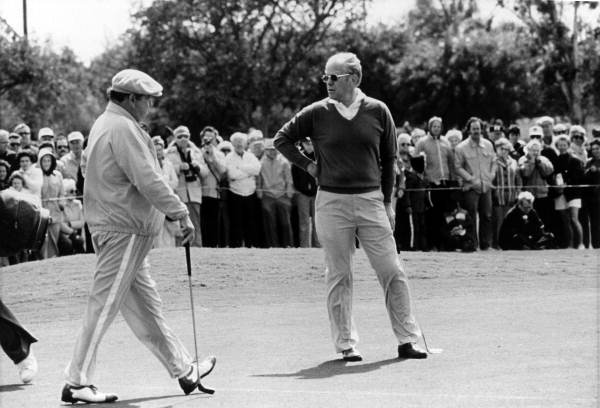
Gleason playing golf with President Gerald Ford, c. 1975

=== Fear of flying ===
For many years Gleason traveled only by train; his fear of flying arose from an incident in his early film career when he was flying back and forth to Los Angeles for relatively minor film work. During one flight to New York two of the plane's engines stopped, and the pilot executed an emergency landing in Tulsa, Oklahoma. Gleason borrowed $200 from a Tulsa hardware-store owner to purchase a train passage to New York.

=== Interest in the paranormal ===
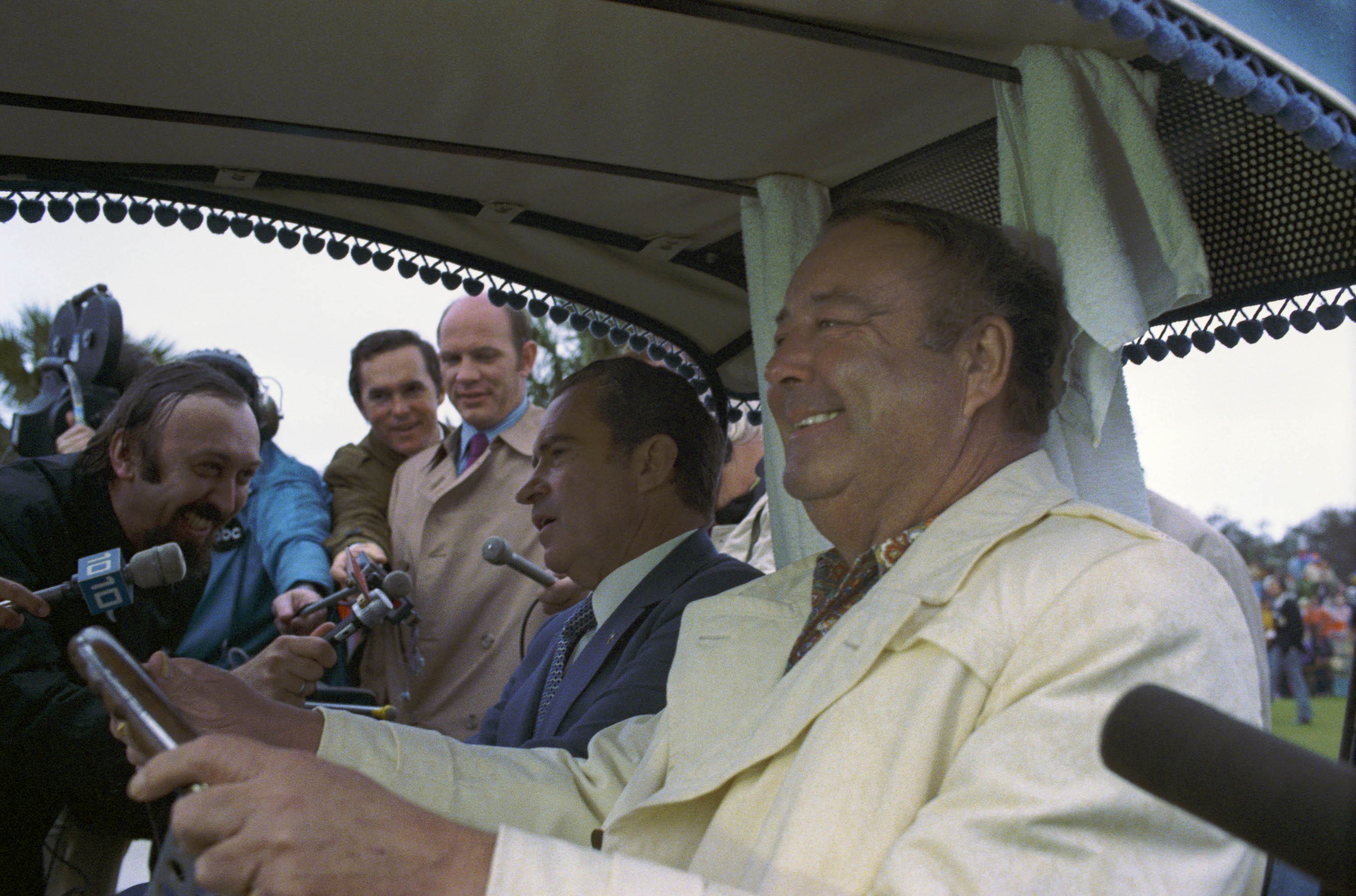
Gleason and President Richard Nixon in a golf cart with an audience in February 1973

Gleason was interested in the paranormal, reading many books on the topic as well as books on parapsychology and UFOs. During the 1950s he was a semi-regular guest on a paranormal-themed overnight radio show hosted by Long John Nebel, and he also wrote the introduction to Donald Bain's biography of Nebel. After his death, his large book collection was donated to the library of the University of Miami.

According to writer Larry Holcombe, Gleason's interest in UFOs prompted President Richard Nixon to share information with him and to disclose some UFO data publicly.

The 2026 Steven Spielberg movie Disclosure Day depicts the urban legend, with a character clearly intended to be Gleason viewing UFOs with Nixon. He is only identified in the film as "Some old TV comedian."

=== Marriages and family ===
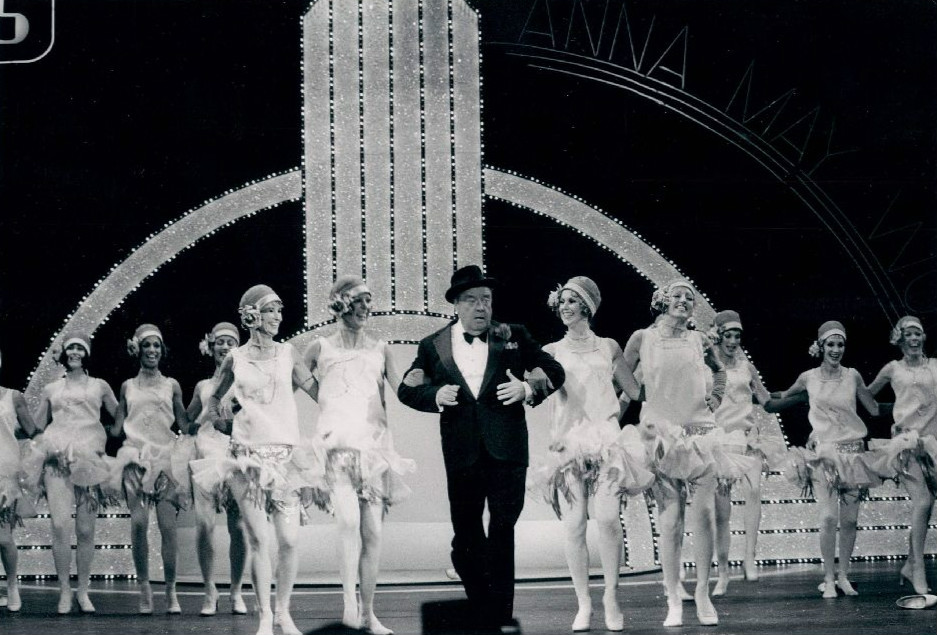
June Taylor Dancers with Gleason on one of his television specials

Gleason met dancer Genevieve Halford when they were working in vaudeville and they were married on September 20, 1936. Halford wanted a quiet home life but Gleason led an active nightlife. Separated for the first time in 1941 and reconciled in 1948, the couple had two daughters, Geraldine (b. 1940) and Linda (b. 1942). Gleason and his wife informally separated again in 1951. It was during this period that Gleason had a romantic relationship with his secretary Honey Merrill, who had been a showgirl and Miss Hollywood of 1956.

In early 1954 Gleason suffered a broken leg and ankle on-air during his television show. His injuries sidelined him for several weeks. When Halford went to visit Gleason in the hospital, she discovered that Marilyn Taylor, a dancer from his television show, was also visiting him. Halford filed for a legal separation in April 1954. A devout Catholic, Halford did not grant Gleason a divorce until 1970.

Gleason met his second wife, Beverly McKittrick, at a country club in 1968, where she worked as a secretary. Ten days after his divorce from Halford was final, Gleason and McKittrick were married in Ashford, England on July 4, 1970. The couple divorced in 1975. Gleason reconnected with Taylor and married her in December 1975. They remained married until he died in 1987.

Gleason's daughter Linda became an actress and married actor-playwright Jason Miller. Their son is actor Jason Patric.

=== Later years, health problems and death ===
As early as 1952, when The Jackie Gleason Show captured Saturday night for CBS, Gleason regularly smoked six packs of cigarettes a day.

Gleason struggled with weight issues throughout much of his life, often weighing close to 300 pounds. His diet primarily consisted of red meat and rich desserts, with little to no vegetables. Additionally, Gleason did not engage in regular exercise and consumed alcohol excessively.

In The Golden Ham: A Candid Biography of Jackie Gleason, author Jim Bishop notes that Gleason had three separate wardrobes to accommodate his fluctuating weight, which varied between 185 and 285 pounds.

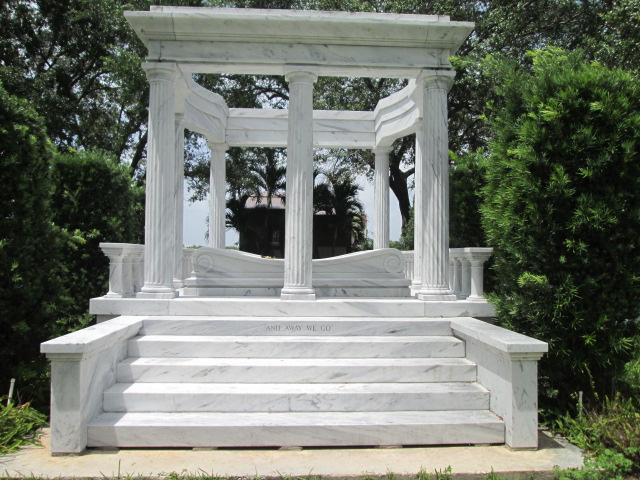
Gleason's sarcophagus—with the inscription "And Away We Go"—at Our Lady of Mercy Catholic Cemetery in Miami

In 1978 he suffered chest pains while touring in the lead role of Larry Gelbart's play Sly Fox and later underwent triple-bypass surgery.

Gleason delivered a critically acclaimed performance as an infirm, acerbic, and somewhat Archie Bunker-like character in the Tom Hanks comedy-drama Nothing in Common (1986), Gleason's final film role. During production he was diagnosed with colon cancer, which had metastasized to his liver. He was also suffering from phlebitis and diabetes. He kept his medical problems private, although there were rumors that he was seriously ill. On June 24, 1987, he died at age 71 in his Florida home.

After a funeral mass at the Cathedral of Saint Mary, Gleason was entombed in a sarcophagus in a private outdoor mausoleum at Our Lady of Mercy Catholic Cemetery in Miami. Gleason's sister-in-law June Taylor is buried to the left of the mausoleum, next to her husband and attorney, Sol Lerner.

== Legacy and honors ==
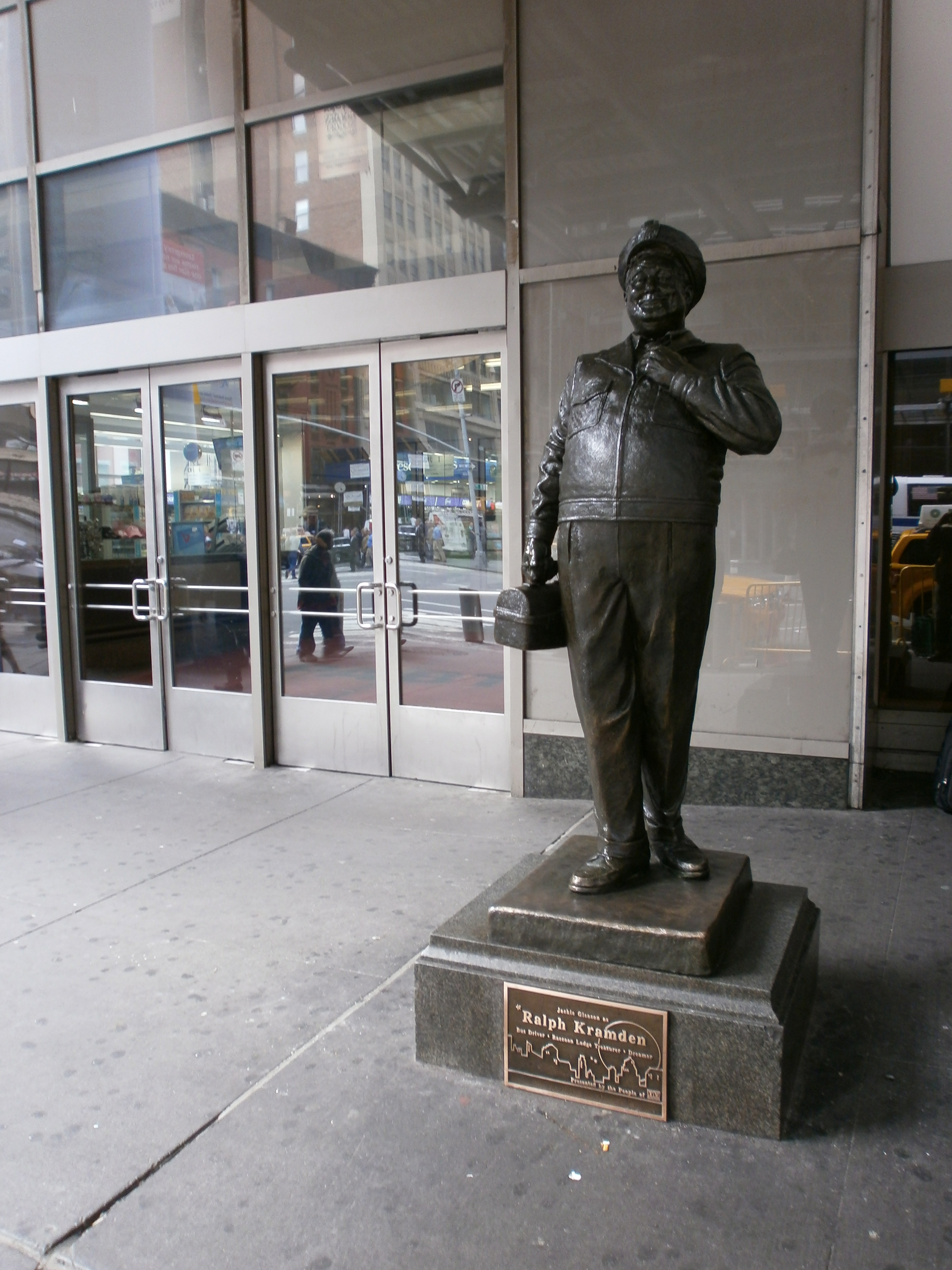
Ralph Kramden statue at the Port Authority Bus Terminal in Manhattan

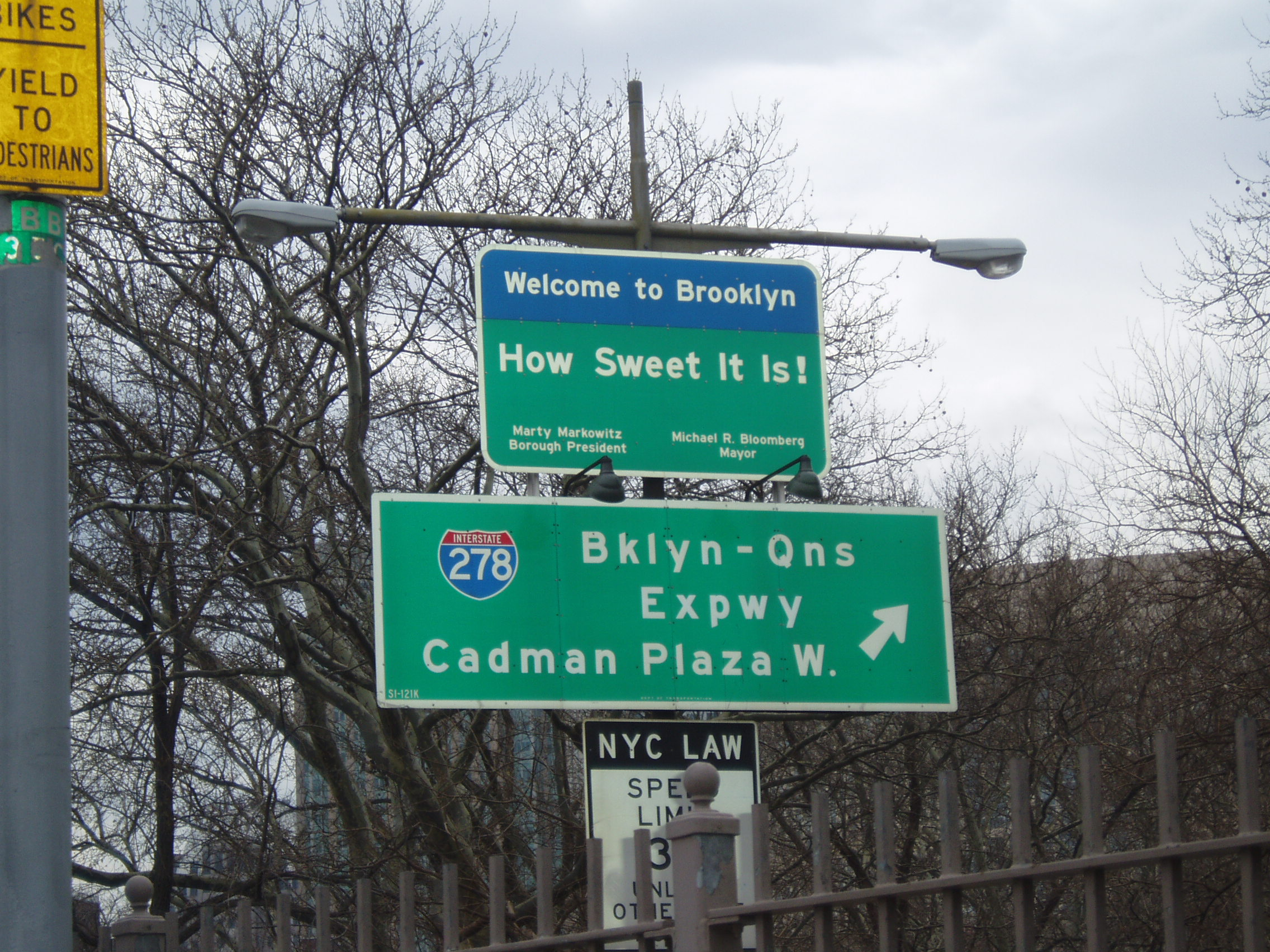
Sign welcoming drivers to Brooklyn (circa 2000s)

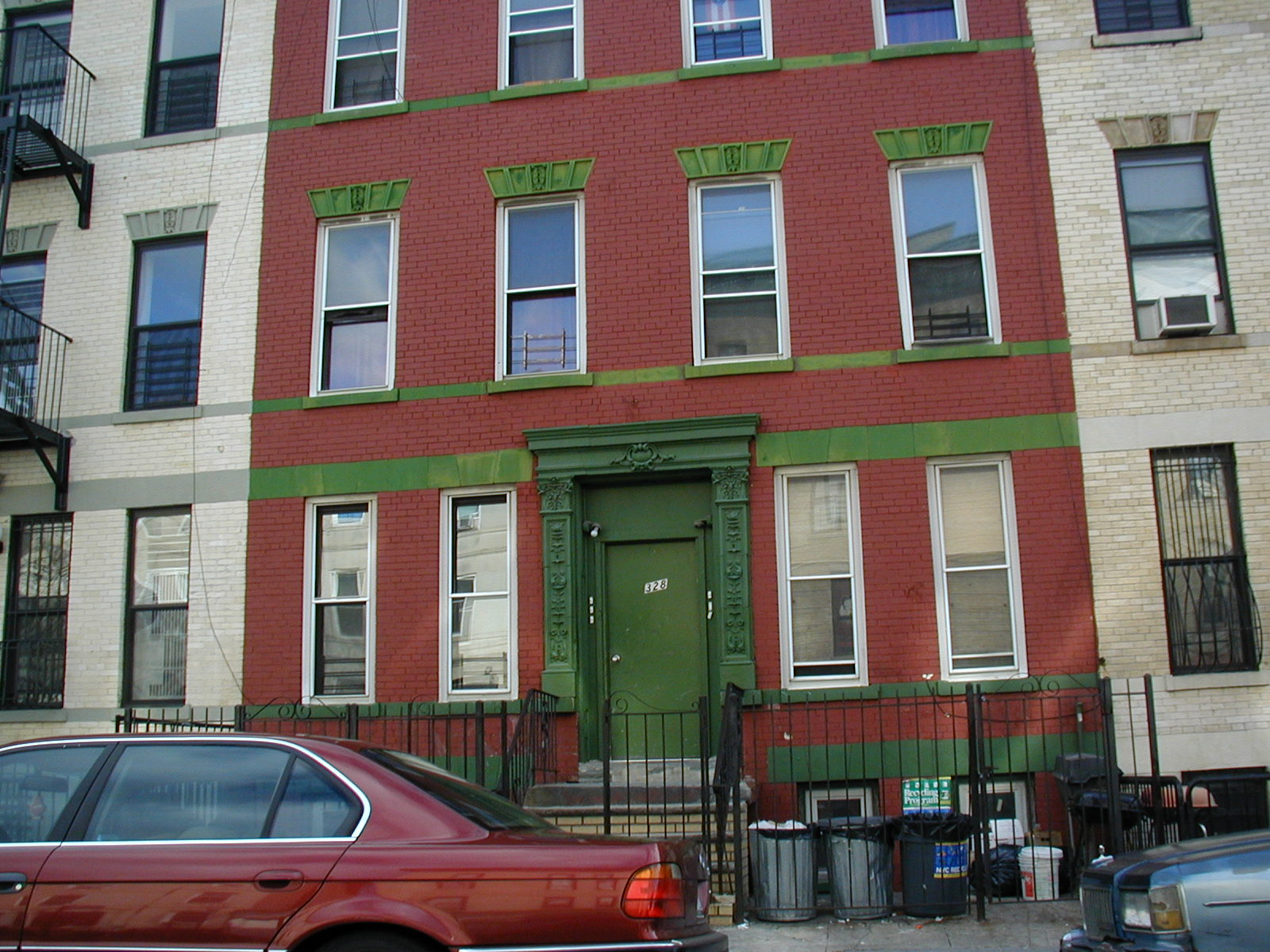
The television home of The Honeymooners at 328 Chauncey Street in Brooklyn

- A 1978 Lincoln Continental limousine, formerly owned by Jackie Gleason, was featured on the TV show "Pawn Stars". The episode, titled "To The Moon," showcased the car when a seller brought it into the Gold & Silver Pawn Shop. The car was a highlight, with Rick Harrison expressing interest due to its celebrity provenance. Ultimately, the car's condition and the expert's assessment determined its fate on the show.
- Miami Beach in 1987 renamed the Miami Beach Auditorium as the Jackie Gleason Theater of the Performing Arts. As of May 2010, the theater was scheduled to be razed as part of a convention center remodeling project and replaced by a hotel. The demolition did not take place and The Fillmore Miami Beach is still in operation as of January 2024.
- Gleason was inducted into the Academy of Television Arts & Sciences Television Hall of Fame in 1986.
- In 2000 a statue of him as Ralph Kramden in "And away we go!" pose was installed at the Miami Beach Bus Terminal.
- Gleason was nominated three times for an Emmy Award, but never won. (Carney and Kean did, however.)
- In 1976 at the Sixth Annual American Guild of Variety Artists (AGVA) "Entertainer of the Year Awards", Paul Lynde received an award for being voted the funniest man of the year. Lynde immediately turned his award over to host Jackie Gleason, citing him as "the funniest man ever." The unexpected gesture shocked Gleason.
- On June 30, 1988, the Sunset Park MTA, NYCT's 5th Avenue Bus Depot in Brooklyn was renamed the Jackie Gleason Depot in honor of the native Brooklynite.
- A statue of Gleason as Ralph Kramden in his bus driver's uniform was dedicated in August 2000 in New York City in Manhattan at the 40th Street entrance of the Port Authority Bus Terminal (PABT). The statue was briefly shown in the film World Trade Center (2006).
- A city park in Lauderhill, Florida, was named the "Jackie Gleason Park" in his honor; it is located near his former home and features racquetball and basketball courts and a children's playground.
- Signs on the Brooklyn Bridge which advise drivers that they are entering Brooklyn have the Gleason phrase "How Sweet It Is!"
- Late in his life actor-playwright Jason Miller, Gleason's former son-in-law, was writing a screenplay based on Gleason's life. He died before it was completed.
- Gleason was portrayed by Brad Garrett in a 2002 television biopic about his life.

== Works ==
=== Television ===
==== 1949–1959 ====
- Your Sports Special (1949) as Himself
- The Lamb's Gambol (March 27, 1949) as Himself
- On The Two A Day (1949, NBC TV) as Himself
- The Life of Riley (October 4, 1949 – March 28, 1950, TV Series) as Chester A. Riley
- The Arrow Show (1949) as Himself
- Tex and Jinx (1949) as Himself
- This Is Show Business (1950) as Himself
- Showtime USA (1950) as Himself
- Cavalcade of Stars (1950–1952, TV Series) as Himself - Host / Ralph Kramden / Reginald Van Gleason III
- The Frank Sinatra Show (1950) as Himself
- Ford Star Revue (1951) as Himself
- The Frank Sinatra Show (1951) as Himself
- Cavalcade of Bands (1951) as Himself
- Stage Entrance (1951, DuMont TV) as Himself
- Musical Comedy Time: No! No! Nanette! (1951) as Himself
- Texaco Star Theatre (1951) as Himself
- Ford Festival (1951) as Himself
- The James Melton Show (May 3, 1951) as Himself
- This Is Show Business (1951) as Himself
- The Colgate Comedy Hour (1951) as Himself
- Ford Star Revue (1951) as Himself
- The Colgate Comedy Hour (1951) as Himself
- The Kate Smith Evening Hour (1951) as Himself
- The Jackie Gleason Show (September 20, 1952 – June 18, 1955, TV Series) as Host / Ralph Kramden / Reginald Van Gleason III
- Arthur Murray Party (1952) as Himself
- The Sam Levinson Show (1952) as Himself
- The Ken Murray Show (1952) as Himself
- Toast of the Town (1952) as Himself
- Celebrity Time (1952) as Himself
- Scout O' Rama (1952) as Himself
- Jane Froman's USA Canteen (1952) as Himself
- Arthur Godfrey and His Friends (1953) as Himself
- Studio One: The Laugh Maker (May 18, 1953, TV Movie) as Himself
- What's My Line? (1953) as Himself
- This Is Show Business (1953) as Himself - Guest / Himself
- Arthur Murray Party (1953) as Himself
- Toast of the Town (1954) as Himself
- The Red Skelton Show (January 5, 1954) as Himself
- Name That Tune (1954) as Himself
- Studio One: Short Cut (December 6, 1954, TV Movie) as Himself
- The Best of Broadway: The Show Off (February 2, 1955, TV Movie) as Himself
- What's My Line? (1955) as Himself
- I've Got a Secret (1955) as Himself
- The Jack Benny Program (May 1, 1955) as Himself
- Stage Show (1955) as Himself
- The Honeymooners (October 1, 1955 – September 22, 1956, TV Series) as Ralph Kramden
- The Red Skelton Show (October 4, 1955)
- Studio One: Uncle Ed and Circumstances (October 10, 1955, TV Movie)
- The $64,000 Question (1956) as Himself
- Person to Person (February 3, 1956) as Himself
- The Herb Shriner Show (October 2, 1956) as Himself
- The Jackie Gleason Show (September 29, 1956 – June 22, 1957, TV Series) as Himself
- Playhouse 90: The Time of Your Life (October 9, 1958, TV Movie) as Joe
- This Is Your Life (1958) as Himself
- Arthur Godfrey Show (1958) as Himself
- The Jackie Gleason Show (October 1958 – January 1959, TV Series) as Himself
- All Star Jazz IV: The Golden Age of Jazz (January 4, 1959) as Himself

==== 1960–1986 ====
- The Fabulous Fifties (1960) as Narrator
- Arthur Godfrey Special (1960) as Himself
- The Secret World of Eddie Hodges (June 23, 1960) (TV Movie, [narration only]) as Narrator / Himself
- The Jackie Gleason Special: The Big Sell Review (October 9, 1960) as Salesman / Reginald Van Gleason III / Joe the Bartender / Ralph Kramden
- Step On the Gas (CBS-10/19/60) TV special
- The Red Skelton Show (January 24, 1961) as Himself
- Sunday Sports Spectacular: Jackie Gleason with the putter and cue (1961) as Himself
- You're In the Picture/The Jackie Gleason Show (January 27 – March 24, 1961) as Himself
- The Jackie Gleason Special: The Million Dollar Incident (April 21, 1961) as Himself
- Jackie Gleason and His American Scene Magazine (September 29, 1962 – June 4, 1966, TV Series) as Himself
- The 35th Annual Academy Awards (1963) as Himself
- Freedom Spectacular (May 14, 1964, NAACP Special) as Himself
- Inquiry (June 13, 1965, June 20, 1965, NBC) as Himself
- The Bob Hope Chrysler Theatre: The Big Stomach (November 16, 1966) as the Vast Waistline
- The Jackie Gleason Show (September 17, 1966 – September 12, 1970, TV Series) as Himself - Host
- Here's Lucy: Lucy Visits Jack Benny (September 30, 1968) as Ralph Kramden
- The Mike Douglas Show (October 15, 1968) as Himself
- The David Frost Show (February 17, 1970) as Himself
- The David Frost Show (April 6, 1970) as Himself
- The David Frost Show (May 7, 1970) as Himself
- The Jackie Gleason Special (December 20, 1970) as Ralph Kramden / Reginald Van Gleason III / the Poor Soul
- The Mike Douglas Show (November 13–17, 20-24 and 29, 1972) as Himself
- The Jackie Gleason Special (November 11, 1973) as Ralph Kramden / Reginald Van Gleason III / the Poor Soul
- Show Business Tribute to Milton Berle (1973)
- Julie & Jackie: How Sweet It Is! (1974)
- Bob Hope Special (1974) as Himself
- The Dean Martin Celebrity Roast (1975) as Himself
- The Dick Cavett Show (August 30, 1975) as Himself
- Dinah! (January 13, 1975) as Himself
- Lucille Ball and Jackie Gleason: Two for Three (December 3, 1975) as Himself
- Super Night at the Super Bowl (1976) as Himself
- The Mike Douglas Show (January 12–16, 1976) as Himself
- The Honeymooners Second Honeymoon (February 2, 1976) as Ralph Kramden
- Donahue (1976) as Himself
- The Captain and Tennille (September 20, 1976) as Himself
- Bing Crosby's White Christmas (1976) as Himself
- Dinah! (February 11, 1977) as Himself
- The Honeymooners Christmas Special (November 28, 1977) as Ralph Kramden
- The Honeymooners Valentine Special (February 13, 1978) as Ralph Kramden
- The Second Honeymooners Christmas Special (December 10, 1978) as Ralph Kramden
- The Mike Douglas Show (May 7, 1980) as Himself
- All Star Party for Burt Reynolds (1981) as Buford T. Justice (brief cameo)
- Mr. Halpern and Mr. Johnson (June 3, 1983, TV Movie) as Ernest Johnson
- 60 Minutes (1984) as Himself
- Izzy and Moe (September 23, 1985, TV Movie) as Himself
- The Honeymooners Reunion (May 13, 1985) as Ralph Kramden
- The 39th Annual Tony Awards (June 2, 1985) as Himself
- The Honeymooners Anniversary Celebration (October 18, 1985) as Ralph Kramden
- The Tonight Show Starring Johnny Carson (October 18, 1985) as Himself
- Gleason: In His Own Words (February 14, 1986) as Himself

=== Stage ===
- Keep Off the Grass (1940)
- Hellzapoppin (1942)
- Artists and Models (1943)
- Follow the Girls (1944)
- The Duchess Misbehaves (1945)
- Heaven on Earth (1948)
- Along Fifth Avenue (1949)
- Take Me Along (1959)
- Sly Fox (1978)

=== Film ===
- Navy Blues (1941) as Tubby
- Steel Against the Sky (1941) as Cliff
- All Through the Night (1942) as Starchy (credited as "Jackie C Gleason")
- Lady Gangster (1942) as Wilson
- Tramp, Tramp, Tramp (1942) as Hank
- Larceny, Inc. (1942) as Hobart
- Escape from Crime (1942) as Screwball Evans
- Orchestra Wives (1942) as Ben Beck
- Springtime in the Rockies (1942) as Commissioner (uncredited)
- The Desert Hawk (1950) as Aladdin
- The Hustler (1961) as Minnesota Fats
- Gigot (1962) as Gigot (also writer)
- Requiem for a Heavyweight (1962) as Maish Rennick
- Papa's Delicate Condition (1963) as Jack Griffith
- Soldier in the Rain (1963) as MSgt. Maxwell Slaughter
- Skidoo (1968) as Tony Banks
- How to Commit Marriage (1969) as Oliver Poe
- Don't Drink the Water (1969) as Walter Hollander
- How Do I Love Thee? (1970) as Stanley Waltz
- Mr. Billion (1977) as John Cutler
- Smokey and the Bandit (1977) as Sheriff Buford T. Justice of Portague County
- Smokey and the Bandit II (1980) as Sheriff Buford T. Justice / Gaylord Justice / Reginald Van Justice
- The Toy (1982) as U.S. Bates
- The Sting II (1983) as Fargo Gondorff
- Smokey and the Bandit Part 3 (1983) as Buford T. Justice
- Izzy and Moe (1985) as Izzy Einstein
- Nothing in Common (1986) as Max Basner (final film role)

=== Music ===
==== Singles discography ====
Year	Titles (A-side, B-side)	Label and Number	Album (or EP-Extended Play)
1951	"What Is a Girl?" b/w "What Is a Boy?" Both sides with narratives by Gleason	Decca 27684	Non-album tracks
1952	"Melancholy Serenade" b/w "You're Getting to Be a Habit"	Capitol F2361	Melancholy Serenade (EP)
1953	"Alone Together" b/w "Body & Soul"	Capitol F2437	Music For Lovers Only
1953	"My Funny Valentine" b/w "Love Is Here to Stay"	Capitol F2438	Music For Lovers Only
1953	"But Not for Me" b/w "Love"	Capitol F2439	Music For Lovers Only
1953	"I'm in the Mood for Love" b/w "I Only Have Eyes For You"	Capitol F2440	Music For Lovers Only
1953	"Terry's Theme from Limelight" b/w "Peg O' My Heart" (from Melancholy Serenade (EP))	Capitol F2507	Non-album track
1953	"White House Serenade" b/w "The President's Lady" (non-album track)	Capitol F2515	Melancholy Serenade (EP)
1953	"Mystery Street" b/w "Golden Violins"	Capitol F2659	Non-album tracks
1955	"I'll Never Be The Same" b/w "Rain"	Capitol F3092	Non-album tracks
1955	"The Band Played On" b/w "In the Good Old Summertime"	Capitol F3144	Non-album tracks
1955	"Autumn Leaves" b/w "Oo! What You Do to Me"	Capitol F3223	Autumn Leaves (EP)
1956	"Capri in May" b/w "You're My Greatest Love" (from Music To Change Her Mind)	Capitol F3337	Non-album track
1957	"To A Sleeping Beauty" b/w "Apology at Bedtime"	Capitol EAP871	The Best of Jackie Gleason
1958	"Where Is She Now?" b/w "Just Only Yesterday"	Capitol F4062	Non-album tracks
1962	"Melancholy Serenade" b/w "Apology at Bedtime"	Capitol 4704	The Best of Jackie Gleason
1962	"Allo 'Allo 'Allo" b/w "Joi De Vivre"	Capitol 4800	Jackie Gleason Presents His Original Music For "Gigot"
1963	"La La La La" b/w "It's Such A Happy Day" (from Silk 'n' Brass)	Capitol 4933	The Best of Jackie Gleason
1964	"Bird Brain" b/w "Soldier in the Rain"	Capitol 5131	Non-album tracks
1965	"I Had But 50¢" b/w "Casey at the Bat" Shown as by "Reginald Van Gleason, III"	Capitol 5420	Non-album tracks
1966	"One of Those Songs" b/w "Love Theme From 'Madame X'" (from Music Around The World For Lovers Only)	Capitol 5584	Silk 'n' Brass

==== Album discography ====
No.	Year	Title	Label and Number	U.S. Billboard Best Selling Popular Albums
1	1952	Music for Lovers Only	Capitol H352 (10")	No. 1 (153 total weeks within the Billboard Top Ten)
2	1953	Lover's Rhapsody	Capitol H366 (10")	No. 1
3	1953	Music to Make You Misty	Capitol H455 (10")	No. 1
4	1954	Tawny	Capitol L471 (10")	No. 8
5	1954	And Awaaay We Go!	Capitol H511 (10")	No. 1
6	1954	Music, Martinis and Memories	Capitol W509	No. 1
7	1954	Melancholy Serenade	Capitol E532 (EP)	-
8	1955	Lonesome Echo	Capitol H627 (10")	No. 1
9	1955	Music for Lovers Only	Capitol W352	No. 7
10	1955	Music to Make You Misty	Capitol W455	No. 11
11	1955	And Awaaay We Go!	Capitol W511	No. 85
12	1955	Jackie Gleason Plays Romantic Jazz	Capitol W568	No. 2
13	1955	Music to Remember Her	Capitol W570	No. 5
14	1955	Lonesome Echo	Capitol W627	No. 1
15	1956	Captain Gleason's Garden Band	Capitol E646 (EP)	-
16	1956	Music to Change Her Mind	Capitol W632	No. 8
17	1956	Night Winds	Capitol W717	No. 10
18	1956	Merry Christmas	Capitol W758	No. 16
19	1957	Music for the Love Hours	Capitol W816	No. 13
20	1957	Velvet Brass	Capitol SW/W859	No. 16
21	1957	"Oooo!"	Capitol SW/W905	No. 14
22	1958	The Torch with the Blue Flame	Capitol SW/W961	No. 2
23	1958	Riff Jazz	Capitol SW/W1020	No. 27
24	1959	Rebound	Capitol SW/W1075	No. 18
25	1959	That Moment	Capitol SW/W1147	No. 36
26	1959	Take Me Along (original cast)	RCA Victor LSO1050	-
27	1960	Aphrodisia	Capitol SW/W1250	No. 49
28	1960	The Actor's Prayer (spoken by Gleason)	The Marsalin Institute	-
29	1960	Opiate D'Amour	Capitol SW/W1314	No. 53
30	1961	Lazy Lively Love	Capitol SW/W1439	No. 57
31	1961	The Gentle Touch	Capitol SW/W1519	No. 62
32	1962	A Lover's Portfolio (two records in a "briefcase")	Capitol SWBO/SBO1619	No. 135
33	1962	Love Embers and Flame	Capitol SW/W1689	No. 103
34	1963	Gigot (soundtrack)	Capitol SW/W1754	-
35	1963	Champagne, Candlelight and Kisses	Capitol SW/W1830	No. 97
36	1963	Movie Themes – For Lovers Only	Capitol SW/W1877	No. 82
37	1963	Today's Romantic Hits – For Lovers Only	Capitol SW/W1978	No. 115
38	1964	Lover's Portfolio Vol. 1 (Music for Sippin' – Music for Dancin')	Capitol SW/W1979	No. 128
39	1964	Lover's Portfolio Vol. 2 (Music for Listenin' – Music for Lovin')	Capitol SW/W1980	No. 137
40	1964	Today's Romantic Hits – For Lovers Only Vol. 2	Capitol SW/W2056	No. 82
41	1965	Last Dance – For Lover's Only	Capitol SW/W2144	No. 131
42	1965	Silk 'n' Brass	Capitol SW/W2409	No. 141
43	1966	Music from Around the World – For Lovers Only	Capitol SW/W2471	No. 102
44	1966	How Sweet It Is for Lovers	Capitol SW/W2582	No. 71
45	1967	A Taste of Brass – For Lovers Only	Capitol SW/W2684	No. 200
46	1967	'Tis the Season	Capitol ST/T2791	No. 37
47	1967	The Best of Jackie Gleason	Capitol SW/W2796	-
48	1967	The Best of Jackie Gleason	Capitol Record Club SWAO-90601	-
49	1968	Doublin' in Brass	Capitol SW/W2880	No. 165
50	1969	The Best of Jackie Gleason, vol. 2	Capitol SKAO-146	-
51	1969	The Now Sound	Capitol SW/W2935	No. 200
52	1969	Irving Berlin's Music – For Lovers Only	Capitol SW106	-
53	1969	Close Up	Capitol SW255	No. 192
54	1969	All I Want for Christmas	Capitol ST346	No. 13
55	1970	Softly	Capitol SL6664	-
56	1970	Romeo and Juliet – A Theme for Lovers	Capitol ST398	-
57	1971	Come Saturday Morning	Capitol ST480	-
58	1972	Words of Love	Capitol ST693	-

==== Compact disc discography ====
Year	Title	Label
1984	Lush Moods	Pair
1987	Music, Martinis and Memories	Capitol
1987	Intimate Music for Lovers	CEMA Special Markets
1990	Merry Christmas	Capitol
1991	Night Winds / Music to Make You Misty	Capitol
1993	The Best of Jackie Gleason	Curb
1994	Shangri-La	Pair
1995	Merry Christmas	Razor & Tie
1995	Body & Soul	Pair
1995	22 Melancholy Serenades	CEMA Special Markets
1996	And Awaaay We Go	Scamp
1996	How Sweet It Is! The Velvet Brass Collection	Razor & Tie
1996	Romantic Moods of Jackie Gleason (Two Disc Set)	EMI Capitol
1996	Thinking of You	CEMA Special Markets
1996	'Tis the Season	Capitol
1996	The Best of Jackie Gleason	Collectibles
1999	Music for Lovers Only / Music to Make You Misty	Collector's Choice
2000	Best of Jackie Gleason	EMI Special Products
2000	Tawny / Music, Martinis and Memories	Collector's Choice
2000	Music, Moonlight and Memories (Three Disc Set)	Reader's Digest
2001	Lonesome Echo	Collector's Choice
2001	Music to Remember Her	Collector's Choice
2001	Lover's Rhapsody / And Awaaay We Go	Collector's Choice
2001	Snowfall	EMI
2002	For Lovers Only: 36 All Time Greatest Hits (Three disc set)	Timeless Media Group
2003	Plays Romantic Jazz	Collector's Choice
2004	Music to Change Her Mind	Collector's Choice
2005	Night Winds	Collector's Choice
2006	A Taste of Brass & Doublin' in Brass	Capitol
2007	Complete Bobby Hackett Sessions (Four Disc Set)	Fine & Mellow
2009	Take Me Along (1959 Original Broadway Cast)	DRG
2009	'Tis the Season	Capitol
2011	That Moment / Opiate D'Amour	Dutton Vocalion
2011	The Torch with the Blue Flame / The Best of 'Oooo!'	Dutton Vocalion
2012	Music For Lovers Only	Real Gone Music
2012	Movie Themes - For Lovers Only / The Last Dance - For Lovers Only	Dutton Vocalion
2012	Romeo and Juliet - A Theme for Lovers / Music Around the World - For Lovers Only	Dutton Vocalion
2012	Gigot	Dutton Vocalion
2012	Champagne, Candlelight and Kisses / Love Embers and Flame	Dutton Vocalion
2012	'Tis the Season / Merry Christmas	Relayer Records

== Sources ==
- Joel Whitburn Presents the Billboard Albums, 6th edition, ISBN 0-89820-166-7
- Whitburn, Joel (1991), The Billboard Book of Top 40 Albums (Revised and enlarged 2nd ed.), Billboard Books, ISBN 0-8230-7534-6
- Additional information obtained can be verified within Billboard's online archive services and print editions of the magazine.
