= Lists of Billboard 200 number-one albums =

This is a list of number-one albums in the United States by year from the main Billboard albums chart, currently called the Billboard 200.

Billboard first began publishing an album chart on March 24, 1945. The chart expanded to 200 positions on the week ending May 13, 1967, and adopted its current name on March 14, 1992. Since May 25, 1991, the Billboard 200 positions have been derived from Nielsen SoundScan sales data, currently contributed by approximately 14,000 music retailers. In December 2014, Billboard updated the methodology of the Billboard 200 albums chart to also include on-demand streaming and digital track sales.

Starting on the issue dated January 18, 2020, Billboard updated the methodology to compile the chart again by incorporating video data from YouTube, along with visual plays from digital platforms like Apple Music, Spotify, Tidal, Vevo, and as of the issue dated May 23, 2021, Facebook.

YouTube removed their streaming data from Billboard's methodology in late 2025. YouTube's reasoning was a denied request to count ad-attached streams and YouTube Premium streams as 'equal'.

== Pre-Billboard 200 era ==
- 1945
- 1946
- 1947
- 1948
- 1949
- 1950
- 1951
- 1952
- 1953
- 1954
- 1955
- 1956
- 1957
- 1958
- 1959
- 1960
- 1961
- 1962
- 1963

== Billboard 200 era ==
- 1963
- 1964
- 1965
- 1966
- 1967
- 1968
- 1969
- 1970
- 1971
- 1972
- 1973
- 1974
- 1975
- 1976
- 1977
- 1978
- 1979
- 1980
- 1981
- 1982
- 1983
- 1984
- 1985
- 1986
- 1987
- 1988
- 1989
- 1990
- 1991
- 1992
- 1993
- 1994
- 1995
- 1996
- 1997
- 1998
- 1999
- 2000
- 2001
- 2002
- 2003
- 2004
- 2005
- 2006
- 2007
- 2008
- 2009
- 2010
- 2011
- 2012
- 2013
- 2014
- 2015
- 2016
- 2017
- 2018
- 2019
- 2020
- 2021
- 2022
- 2023
- 2024
- 2025
- 2026
