= List of Billboard 200 number-one albums of 1969 =

These are the Billboard magazine number-one albums of 1969, per the Billboard 200.

Iron Butterfly's In-A-Gadda-Da-Vida was the best performing album of 1969 despite not reaching number one at any point during the year. The album peaked at #4 on August 9, 1969.

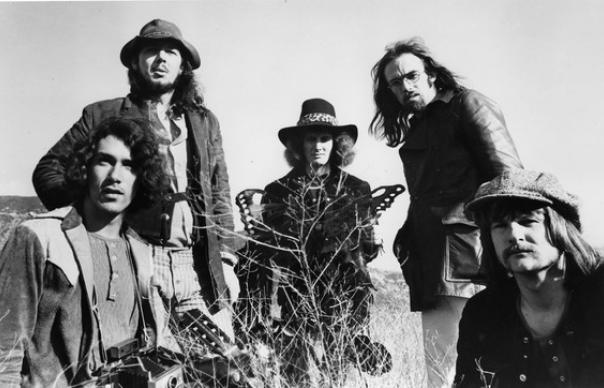
Iron Butterfly's In-A-Gadda-Da-Vida was the best-selling album of 1969, despite not reaching number one.

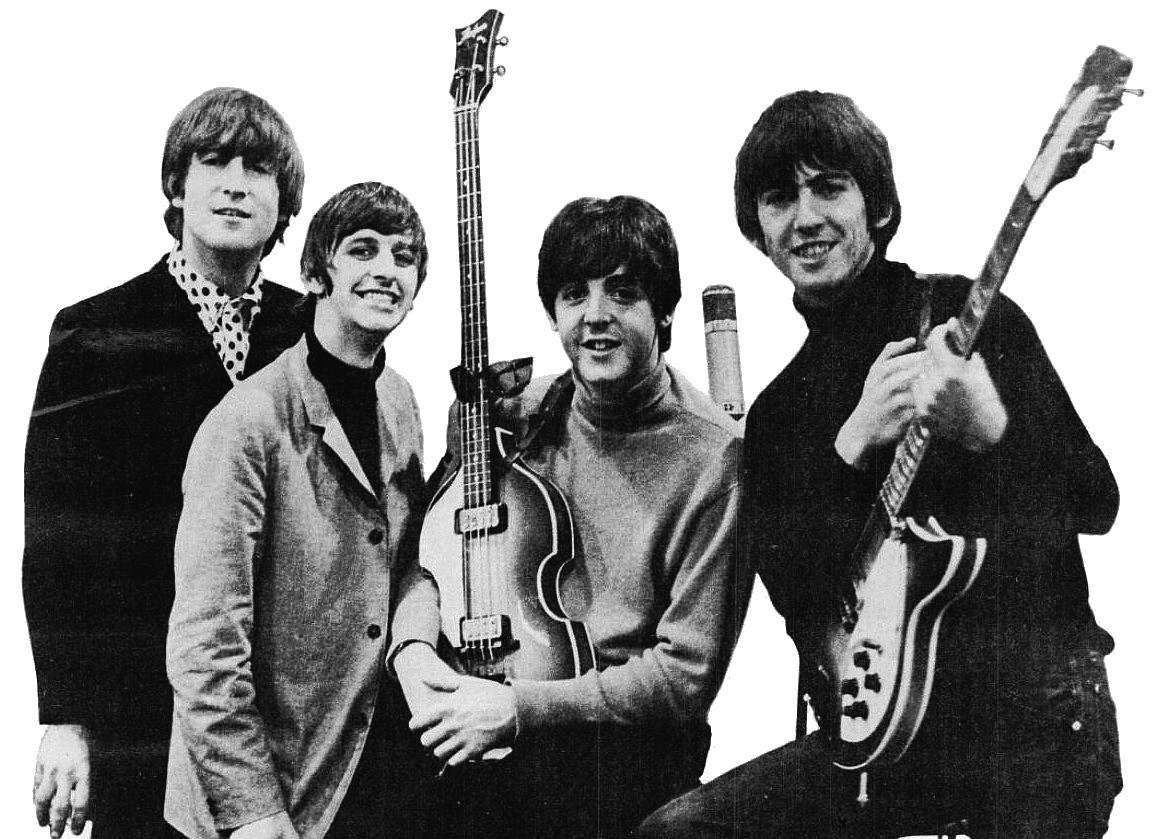
The Beatles had two number one albums in 1969, The Beatles (The White Album) and Abbey Road, which spent 16 cumulative weeks at number one.

== Chart history ==
Issue date	Album	Artist(s)	Label	Ref.
January 4	The Beatles (The White Album)	The Beatles	Apple	
January 11	The Beatles (The White Album)	The Beatles	Apple	
January 18	The Beatles (The White Album)	The Beatles	Apple	
January 25	The Beatles (The White Album)	The Beatles	Apple	
February 1	The Beatles (The White Album)	The Beatles	Apple	
February 8	TCB	Diana Ross & The Supremes and The Temptations / Soundtrack	Motown	
February 15	The Beatles (The White Album)	The Beatles	Apple	
February 22	The Beatles (The White Album)	The Beatles	Apple	
March 1	The Beatles (The White Album)	The Beatles	Apple	
March 8	Wichita Lineman	Glen Campbell	Capitol	
March 15	Wichita Lineman	Glen Campbell	Capitol	
March 22	Wichita Lineman	Glen Campbell	Capitol	
March 29	Blood, Sweat & Tears	Blood, Sweat & Tears	Columbia	
April 5	Wichita Lineman	Glen Campbell	Capitol	
April 12	Blood, Sweat & Tears	Blood, Sweat & Tears	Columbia	
April 19	Blood, Sweat & Tears	Blood, Sweat & Tears	Columbia	
April 26	Hair	Original Cast	RCA Victor	
May 3	Hair	Original Cast	RCA Victor	
May 10	Hair	Original Cast	RCA Victor	
May 17	Hair	Original Cast	RCA Victor	
May 24	Hair	Original Cast	RCA Victor	
May 31	Hair	Original Cast	RCA Victor	
June 7	Hair	Original Cast	RCA Victor	
June 14	Hair	Original Cast	RCA Victor	
June 21	Hair	Original Cast	RCA Victor	
June 28	Hair	Original Cast	RCA Victor	
July 5	Hair	Original Cast	RCA Victor	
July 12	Hair	Original Cast	RCA Victor	
July 19	Hair	Original Cast	RCA Victor	
July 26	Blood, Sweat & Tears	Blood, Sweat & Tears	Columbia	
August 2	Blood, Sweat & Tears	Blood, Sweat & Tears	Columbia	
August 9	Blood, Sweat & Tears	Blood, Sweat & Tears	Columbia	
August 16	Blood, Sweat & Tears	Blood, Sweat & Tears	Columbia	
August 23	Johnny Cash at San Quentin	Johnny Cash	Columbia	
August 30	Johnny Cash at San Quentin	Johnny Cash	Columbia	
September 6	Johnny Cash at San Quentin	Johnny Cash	Columbia	
September 13	Johnny Cash at San Quentin	Johnny Cash	Columbia	
September 20	Blind Faith	Blind Faith	Atco	
September 27	Blind Faith	Blind Faith	Atco	
October 4	Green River	Creedence Clearwater Revival	Fantasy	
October 11	Green River	Creedence Clearwater Revival	Fantasy	
October 18	Green River	Creedence Clearwater Revival	Fantasy	
October 25	Green River	Creedence Clearwater Revival	Fantasy	
November 1	Abbey Road	The Beatles	Apple	
November 8	Abbey Road	The Beatles	Apple	
November 15	Abbey Road	The Beatles	Apple	
November 22	Abbey Road	The Beatles	Apple	
November 29	Abbey Road	The Beatles	Apple	
December 6	Abbey Road	The Beatles	Apple	
December 13	Abbey Road	The Beatles	Apple	
December 20	Abbey Road	The Beatles	Apple	
December 27	Led Zeppelin II	Led Zeppelin	Atlantic	

== See also ==
- 1969 in music
- List of number-one albums (United States)
