= List of Billboard number-one albums of 1960 =

These are the number-one albums in the United States per Billboard magazine during the year 1960. From May 5, 1959, until August 1963, separate charts existed for albums in mono and stereo formats. During 1960, those charts were named Mono Action Albums and Stereo Action Albums.

== Chart history ==
Key
†	Indicates best performing album of 1960

Chart history
Issue date	Mono			Stereo			Ref.
Issue date	Album	Artist(s)	Label	Album	Artist(s)	Label	Ref.
January 4	Here We Go Again!	The Kingston Trio	Capitol	Here We Go Again!	The Kingston Trio	Capitol	
January 11	Here We Go Again!	The Kingston Trio	Capitol	The Lord's Prayer	The Mormon Tabernacle Choir	Columbia	
January 18	Here We Go Again!	The Kingston Trio	Capitol	Here We Go Again!	The Kingston Trio	Capitol	
January 25	Here We Go Again!	The Kingston Trio	Capitol	The Sound of Music †	Original Cast	Columbia	
February 1	Here We Go Again!	The Kingston Trio	Capitol	The Sound of Music †	Original Cast	Columbia	
February 8	The Sound of Music †	Original Cast	Columbia	The Sound of Music †	Original Cast	Columbia	
February 15	The Sound of Music †	Original Cast	Columbia	The Sound of Music †	Original Cast	Columbia	
February 22	The Sound of Music †	Original Cast	Columbia	The Sound of Music †	Original Cast	Columbia	
February 29	The Sound of Music †	Original Cast	Columbia	The Sound of Music †	Original Cast	Columbia	
March 7	The Sound of Music †	Original Cast	Columbia	The Sound of Music †	Original Cast	Columbia	
March 14	The Sound of Music †	Original Cast	Columbia	The Sound of Music †	Original Cast	Columbia	
March 21	The Sound of Music †	Original Cast	Columbia	The Sound of Music †	Original Cast	Columbia	
March 28	The Sound of Music †	Original Cast	Columbia	The Sound of Music †	Original Cast	Columbia	
April 4	The Sound of Music †	Original Cast	Columbia	The Sound of Music †	Original Cast	Columbia	
April 11	The Sound of Music †	Original Cast	Columbia	The Sound of Music †	Original Cast	Columbia	
April 18	The Sound of Music †	Original Cast	Columbia	The Sound of Music †	Original Cast	Columbia	
April 25	The Sound of Music †	Original Cast	Columbia	Persuasive Percussion	Terry Snyder and the All Stars	Command	
May 2	Theme from A Summer Place	Billy Vaughn and His Orchestra	Dot	The Sound of Music †	Original Cast	Columbia	
May 9	Sold Out	The Kingston Trio	Capitol	The Sound of Music †	Original Cast	Columbia	
May 16	Theme from A Summer Place	Billy Vaughn and His Orchestra	Dot	Persuasive Percussion	Terry Snyder and the All Stars	Command	
May 23	Sold Out	The Kingston Trio	Capitol	Sold Out	The Kingston Trio	Capitol	
May 30	Sold Out	The Kingston Trio	Capitol	Persuasive Percussion	Terry Snyder and the All Stars	Command	
June 6	Sold Out	The Kingston Trio	Capitol	Persuasive Percussion	Terry Snyder and the All Stars	Command	
June 13	Sold Out	The Kingston Trio	Capitol	Persuasive Percussion	Terry Snyder and the All Stars	Command	
June 20	Sold Out	The Kingston Trio	Capitol	Persuasive Percussion	Terry Snyder and the All Stars	Command	
June 27	Sold Out	The Kingston Trio	Capitol	Persuasive Percussion	Terry Snyder and the All Stars	Command	
July 4	Sold Out	The Kingston Trio	Capitol	Persuasive Percussion	Terry Snyder and the All Stars	Command	
July 11	Sold Out	The Kingston Trio	Capitol	Persuasive Percussion	Terry Snyder and the All Stars	Command	
July 18	Sold Out	The Kingston Trio	Capitol	Persuasive Percussion	Terry Snyder and the All Stars	Command	
July 25	The Button-Down Mind of Bob Newhart	Bob Newhart	Warner Bros.	Persuasive Percussion	Terry Snyder and the All Stars	Command	
August 1	The Button-Down Mind of Bob Newhart	Bob Newhart	Warner Bros.	Persuasive Percussion	Terry Snyder and the All Stars	Command	
August 8	The Button-Down Mind of Bob Newhart	Bob Newhart	Warner Bros.	Persuasive Percussion	Terry Snyder and the All Stars	Command	
August 15	The Button-Down Mind of Bob Newhart	Bob Newhart	Warner Bros.	Sold Out	The Kingston Trio	Capitol	
August 22	The Button-Down Mind of Bob Newhart	Bob Newhart	Warner Bros.	Sold Out	The Kingston Trio	Capitol	
August 29	The Button-Down Mind of Bob Newhart	Bob Newhart	Warner Bros.	String Along	The Kingston Trio	Capitol	
September 5	The Button-Down Mind of Bob Newhart	Bob Newhart	Warner Bros.	String Along	The Kingston Trio	Capitol	
September 12	The Button-Down Mind of Bob Newhart	Bob Newhart	Warner Bros.	String Along	The Kingston Trio	Capitol	
September 19	String Along	The Kingston Trio	Capitol	String Along	The Kingston Trio	Capitol	
September 26	String Along	The Kingston Trio	Capitol	String Along	The Kingston Trio	Capitol	
October 3	String Along	The Kingston Trio	Capitol	String Along	The Kingston Trio	Capitol	
October 10	String Along	The Kingston Trio	Capitol	String Along	The Kingston Trio	Capitol	
October 17	String Along	The Kingston Trio	Capitol	String Along	The Kingston Trio	Capitol	
October 24	Nice 'N' Easy	Frank Sinatra	Capitol	Nice 'N' Easy	Frank Sinatra	Capitol	
October 31	The Button-Down Mind of Bob Newhart	Bob Newhart	Warner Bros.	Nice 'N' Easy	Frank Sinatra	Capitol	
November 7	The Button-Down Mind of Bob Newhart	Bob Newhart	Warner Bros.	Nice 'N' Easy	Frank Sinatra	Capitol	
November 14	The Button-Down Mind of Bob Newhart	Bob Newhart	Warner Bros.	String Along	The Kingston Trio	Capitol	
November 21	The Button-Down Mind of Bob Newhart	Bob Newhart	Warner Bros.	Nice 'N' Easy	Frank Sinatra	Capitol	
November 28	The Button-Down Mind of Bob Newhart	Bob Newhart	Warner Bros.	Nice 'N' Easy	Frank Sinatra	Capitol	
December 5	G.I. Blues	Elvis Presley / Soundtrack	RCA Victor	Nice 'N' Easy	Frank Sinatra	Capitol	
December 12	The Button-Down Mind of Bob Newhart	Bob Newhart	Warner Bros.	Nice 'N' Easy	Frank Sinatra	Capitol	
December 19	G.I. Blues	Elvis Presley / Soundtrack	RCA Victor	Nice 'N' Easy	Frank Sinatra	Capitol	
December 26	G.I. Blues	Elvis Presley / Soundtrack	RCA Victor	String Along	The Kingston Trio	Capitol	
December 31	G.I. Blues	Elvis Presley / Soundtrack	RCA Victor	Nice 'N' Easy	Frank Sinatra	Capitol	

== See also ==
- 1960 in music
