= Flower Drum Song (disambiguation) =

Flower Drum Song is a 1958 Rodgers and Hammerstein stage musical.

Flower Drum Song may also refer to:

== Book ==
- The Flower Drum Song (novel), a 1957 novel by C. Y. Lee, adapted into the musical

== Albums ==
- Flower Drum Song (original Broadway cast recording), a 1958 recording of the stage musical made by its original Broadway cast
- Flower Drum Song (album), a 1959 album by The Mastersounds containing interpretations of the songs from the stage musical

== Film ==
- Flower Drum Song (film), a 1961 musical film based on the stage musical

== Other ==
- Fengyang Flower Drum, a Chinese folk song
- Flower-drum opera or Huaguxi, a form of Chinese opera

== See also ==
- Flower drum, a type of Chinese hand drum
