= List of Billboard 200 number-one albums of 1978 =

These are the Billboard magazine number-one albums of 1978, per the Billboard 200.

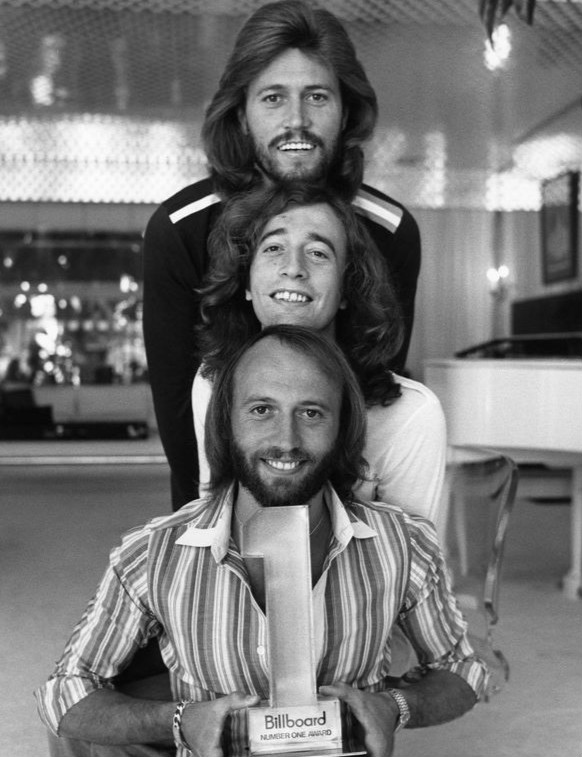
The Bee Gees' Saturday Night Fever soundtrack was the best-selling album of 1978, and spent 24 consecutive weeks at number one.

== Chart history ==
Key
| † | Indicates best performing album of 1978 |

| Issue date | Album | Artist(s) | Label | Ref. |
|---|---|---|---|---|
| January 7 | Rumours | Fleetwood Mac | Warner Bros. | |
| January 14 | Rumours | Fleetwood Mac | Warner Bros. | |
| January 21 | Saturday Night Fever † | Bee Gees Various Artists / Soundtrack | RSO | |
| January 28 | Saturday Night Fever † | Bee Gees Various Artists / Soundtrack | RSO | |
| February 4 | Saturday Night Fever † | Bee Gees Various Artists / Soundtrack | RSO | |
| February 11 | Saturday Night Fever † | Bee Gees Various Artists / Soundtrack | RSO | |
| February 18 | Saturday Night Fever † | Bee Gees Various Artists / Soundtrack | RSO | |
| February 25 | Saturday Night Fever † | Bee Gees Various Artists / Soundtrack | RSO | |
| March 4 | Saturday Night Fever † | Bee Gees Various Artists / Soundtrack | RSO | |
| March 11 | Saturday Night Fever † | Bee Gees Various Artists / Soundtrack | RSO | |
| March 18 | Saturday Night Fever † | Bee Gees Various Artists / Soundtrack | RSO | |
| March 25 | Saturday Night Fever † | Bee Gees Various Artists / Soundtrack | RSO | |
| April 1 | Saturday Night Fever † | Bee Gees Various Artists / Soundtrack | RSO | |
| April 8 | Saturday Night Fever † | Bee Gees Various Artists / Soundtrack | RSO | |
| April 15 | Saturday Night Fever † | Bee Gees Various Artists / Soundtrack | RSO | |
| April 22 | Saturday Night Fever † | Bee Gees Various Artists / Soundtrack | RSO | |
| April 29 | Saturday Night Fever † | Bee Gees Various Artists / Soundtrack | RSO | |
| May 6 | Saturday Night Fever † | Bee Gees Various Artists / Soundtrack | RSO | |
| May 13 | Saturday Night Fever † | Bee Gees Various Artists / Soundtrack | RSO | |
| May 20 | Saturday Night Fever † | Bee Gees Various Artists / Soundtrack | RSO | |
| May 27 | Saturday Night Fever † | Bee Gees Various Artists / Soundtrack | RSO | |
| June 3 | Saturday Night Fever † | Bee Gees Various Artists / Soundtrack | RSO | |
| June 10 | Saturday Night Fever † | Bee Gees Various Artists / Soundtrack | RSO | |
| June 17 | Saturday Night Fever † | Bee Gees Various Artists / Soundtrack | RSO | |
| June 24 | Saturday Night Fever † | Bee Gees Various Artists / Soundtrack | RSO | |
| July 1 | Saturday Night Fever † | Bee Gees Various Artists / Soundtrack | RSO | |
| July 8 | City to City | Gerry Rafferty | United Artists | |
| July 15 | Some Girls | The Rolling Stones | Rolling Stones | |
| July 22 | Some Girls | The Rolling Stones | Rolling Stones | |
| July 29 | Grease | Soundtrack | RSO | |
| August 5 | Grease | Soundtrack | RSO | |
| August 12 | Grease | Soundtrack | RSO | |
| August 19 | Grease | Soundtrack | RSO | |
| August 26 | Grease | Soundtrack | RSO | |
| September 2 | Grease | Soundtrack | RSO | |
| September 9 | Grease | Soundtrack | RSO | |
| September 16 | Don't Look Back | Boston | Epic | |
| September 23 | Grease | Soundtrack | RSO | |
| September 30 | Grease | Soundtrack | RSO | |
| October 7 | Don't Look Back | Boston | Epic | |
| October 14 | Grease | Soundtrack | RSO | |
| October 21 | Grease | Soundtrack | RSO | |
| October 28 | Grease | Soundtrack | RSO | |
| November 4 | Living in the USA | Linda Ronstadt | Asylum | |
| November 11 | Live and More | Donna Summer | Casablanca | |
| November 18 | 52nd Street | Billy Joel | Columbia | |
| November 25 | 52nd Street | Billy Joel | Columbia | |
| December 2 | 52nd Street | Billy Joel | Columbia | |
| December 9 | 52nd Street | Billy Joel | Columbia | |
| December 16 | 52nd Street | Billy Joel | Columbia | |
| December 23 | 52nd Street | Billy Joel | Columbia | |
| December 30 | 52nd Street | Billy Joel | Columbia | |

== See also ==
- 1978 in music
- List of number-one albums (United States)
