= List of Billboard Hot 100 number ones of 1982 =

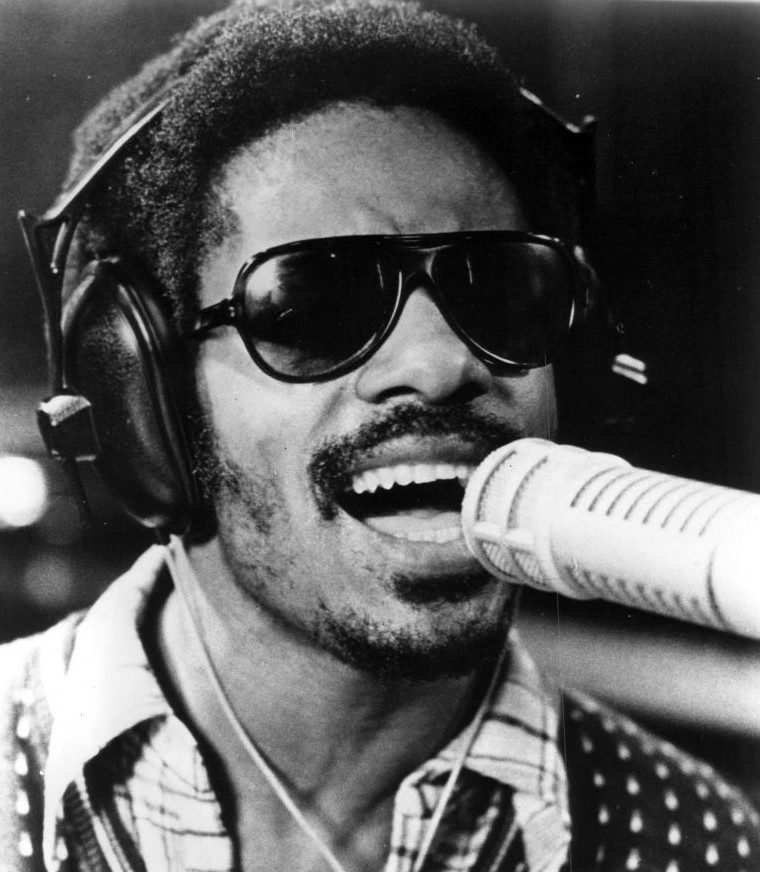
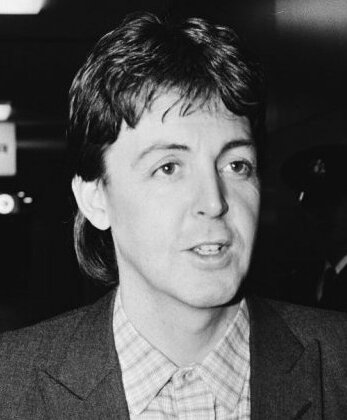
Stevie Wonder and Paul McCartney spent seven weeks at number one with "Ebony and Ivory".

The Billboard Hot 100 is a chart published since August 1958 by Billboard magazine which ranks the best-performing singles in the United States. In 1982, it was compiled based on a combination of sales and airplay data sourced from surveys of retail outlets and playlists submitted by radio stations, respectively. During the year, 16 different singles spent time at number one.

At the start of the year, "Physical" by Olivia Newton-John was at number one. The song had held the top spot for the final six weeks of 1981 and added a further four weeks in 1982 for a final total of ten weeks at number one, tying the record set by Debby Boone's "You Light Up My Life" in 1977 for the longest-running chart-topper in the history of the Hot 100. In the issue of Billboard dated January 30, "Physical" was displaced from number one by "I Can't Go for That (No Can Do)" by Daryl Hall & John Oates. The duo returned to number one in December with "Maneater" and was the only act with multiple chart-toppers in 1982. The two longest running number-one singles of 1982 were "I Love Rock 'n' Roll" by Joan Jett and the Blackhearts and "Ebony and Ivory" by Paul McCartney and Stevie Wonder, which each stayed at the top for seven weeks. Additionally, the J. Geils Band and Survivor had six-week runs at number one with "Centerfold" and "Eye of the Tiger" respectively; these long runs contributed to the Hot 100 having the fewest number ones in a calendar year since 1968.

Although McCartney and Wonder had each had many number ones prior to their collaboration, none of the other acts that spent six or more weeks atop the Hot 100 in 1982 had reached the top spot before. "Centerfold" was the first number one for the J. Geils Band, more than a decade after the group first entered the Hot 100. In contrast, "I Love Rock 'n' Roll" was the first single by Joan Jett and the Blackhearts to chart. "Eye of the Tiger", taken from the soundtrack of the film Rocky III, was the first number one for Survivor. Another film theme, "Chariots of Fire", taken from the film of the same name, gave Vangelis a number one with the only Hot 100 entry of his career. In July, the Human League topped the Hot 100 for the first time with "Don't You Want Me", which was later named by Rolling Stone as the "breakthrough song" of the Second British Invasion of the United States music scene, which led to British acts dominating the upper reaches of the Hot 100 in 1983. In October, John Cougar gained his first chart-topper with "Jack & Diane"; the singer appended his real surname to his stage name shortly after this breakthrough to become John Cougar Mellencamp and since the start of the 1990s has recorded as simply John Mellencamp. Cougar's song was replaced at number one by "Who Can It Be Now?", the first number one and first charting single by the Australian band Men at Work. The year's third film theme to top the chart was "Up Where We Belong" by Joe Cocker and Jennifer Warnes, from An Officer and a Gentleman. Neither singer had achieved a previous number one, although Cocker had first charted as far back as 1968. Toni Basil was 1982's final act to gain a career first number one when "Mickey" spent a single week in the top spot in December.

== Chart history ==
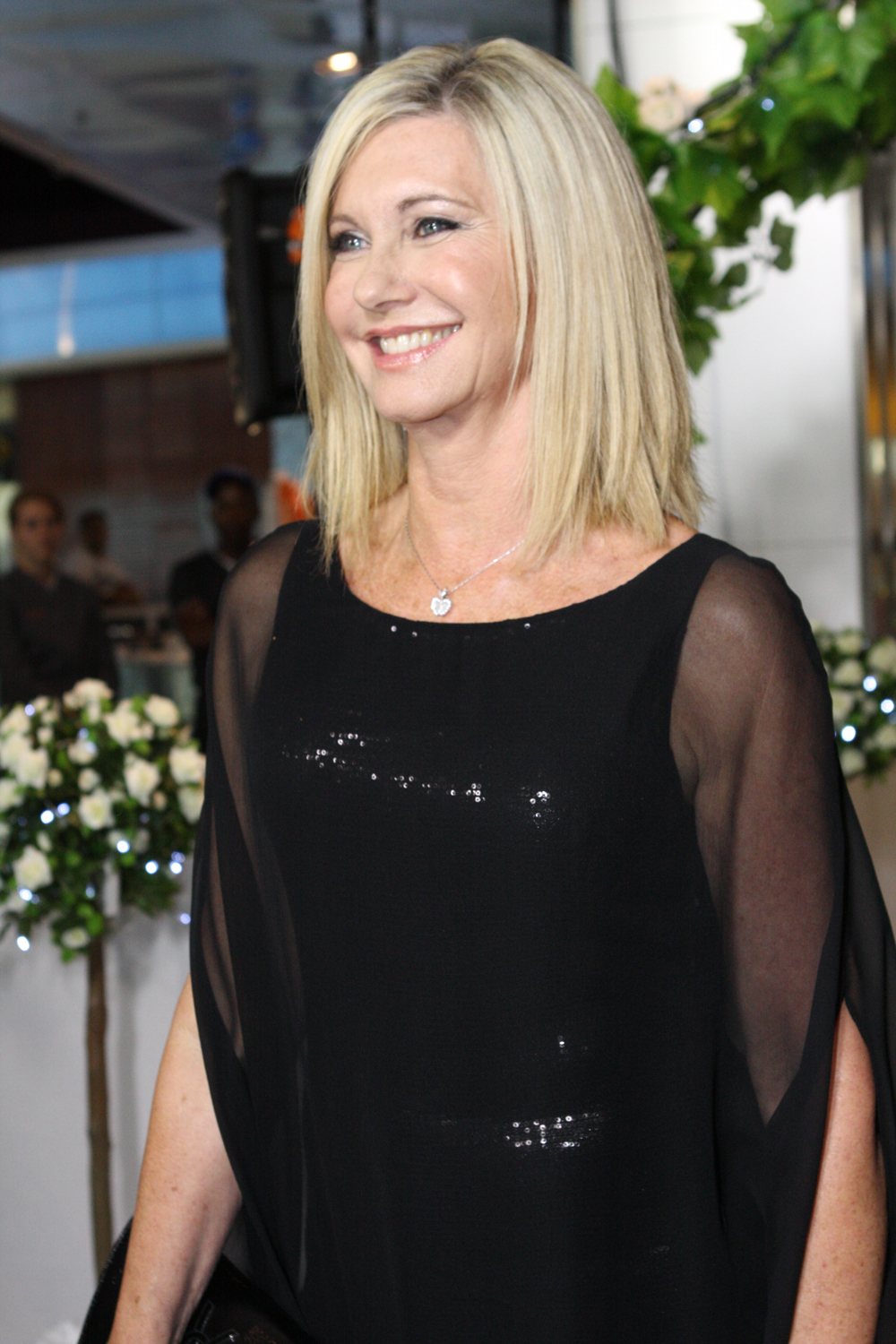
Olivia Newton-John (pictured in 2012) began the year at number one with "Physical", continuing a run which ultimately lasted ten weeks.

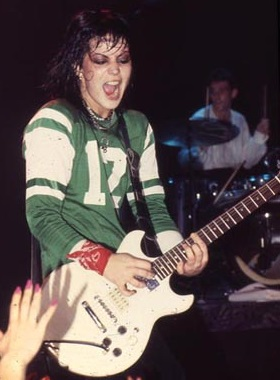
Joan Jett and the Blackhearts (Jett pictured) tied for the year's longest-running chart-topper.

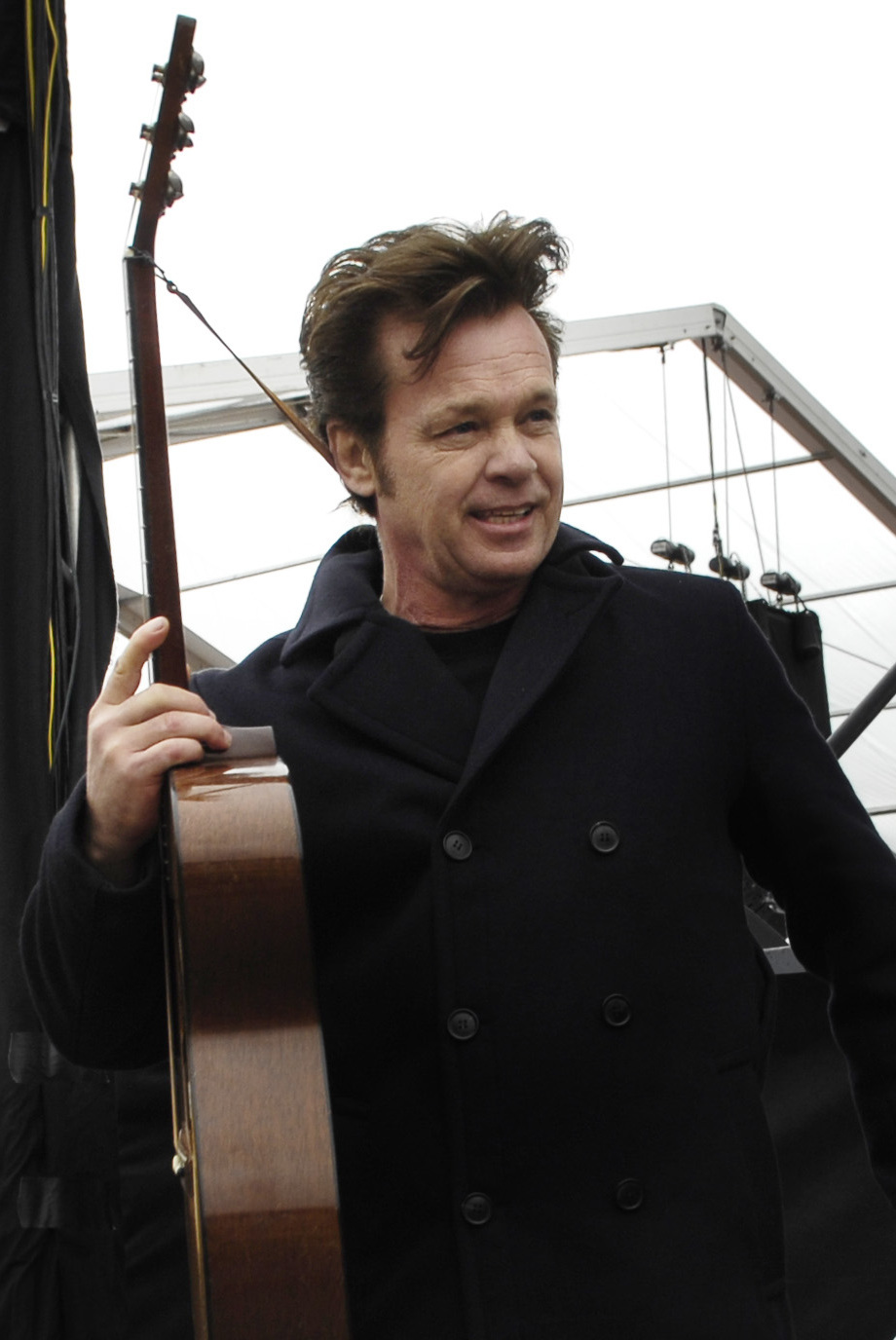
"Jack & Diane" was a chart-topper for John Cougar. Since the early 1990s, the singer (pictured in 2007) has recorded under his real name, John Mellencamp.

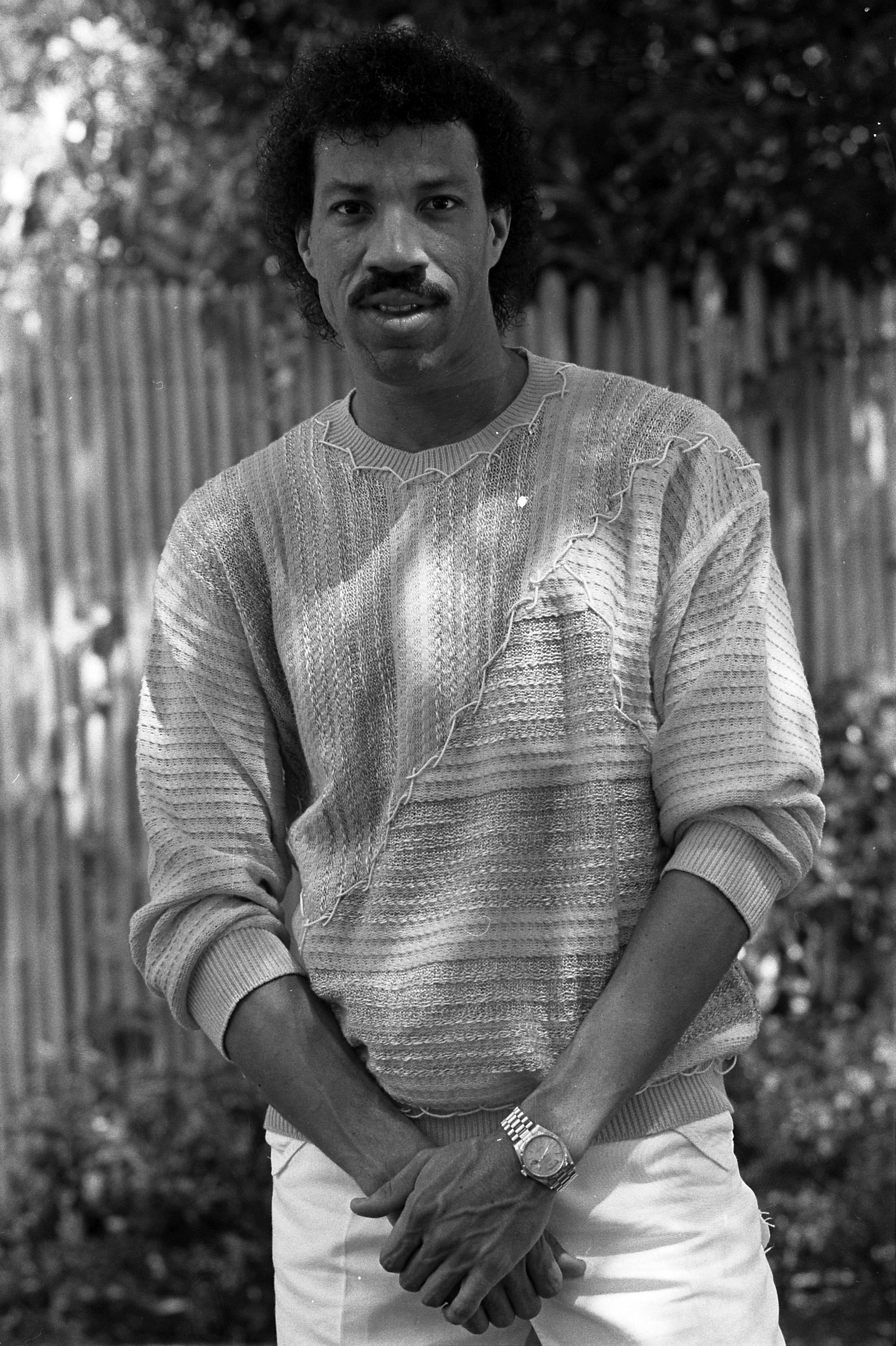
Lionel Richie spent two weeks at number one with "Truly".

Chart history
No. (Note: The "No." column indicates the numerical sequence of number ones in Hot 100 history. "Re" indicates a single returning to number one.)	Issue date	Title	Artist(s)	Ref.
511	January 2 (Note: This was an unpublished week, due to a special double issue that Billboard published in print the previous week. All positions on the Hot 100 were "frozen" during the break.)	"Physical"	Olivia Newton-John	
511	January 9	"Physical"	Olivia Newton-John	
511	January 16	"Physical"	Olivia Newton-John	
511	January 23	"Physical"	Olivia Newton-John	
512	January 30	"I Can't Go for That (No Can Do)"	Daryl Hall & John Oates	
513	February 6	"Centerfold"	The J. Geils Band	
513	February 13	"Centerfold"	The J. Geils Band	
513	February 20	"Centerfold"	The J. Geils Band	
513	February 27	"Centerfold"	The J. Geils Band	
513	March 6	"Centerfold"	The J. Geils Band	
513	March 13	"Centerfold"	The J. Geils Band	
514	March 20	"I Love Rock 'n' Roll"	Joan Jett and the Blackhearts	
514	March 27	"I Love Rock 'n' Roll"	Joan Jett and the Blackhearts	
514	April 3	"I Love Rock 'n' Roll"	Joan Jett and the Blackhearts	
514	April 10	"I Love Rock 'n' Roll"	Joan Jett and the Blackhearts	
514	April 17	"I Love Rock 'n' Roll"	Joan Jett and the Blackhearts	
514	April 24	"I Love Rock 'n' Roll"	Joan Jett and the Blackhearts	
514	May 1	"I Love Rock 'n' Roll"	Joan Jett and the Blackhearts	
515	May 8	"Chariots of Fire"	Vangelis	
516	May 15	"Ebony and Ivory"	Paul McCartney and Stevie Wonder	
516	May 22	"Ebony and Ivory"	Paul McCartney and Stevie Wonder	
516	May 29	"Ebony and Ivory"	Paul McCartney and Stevie Wonder	
516	June 5	"Ebony and Ivory"	Paul McCartney and Stevie Wonder	
516	June 12	"Ebony and Ivory"	Paul McCartney and Stevie Wonder	
516	June 19	"Ebony and Ivory"	Paul McCartney and Stevie Wonder	
516	June 26	"Ebony and Ivory"	Paul McCartney and Stevie Wonder	
517	July 3	"Don't You Want Me"	The Human League	
517	July 10	"Don't You Want Me"	The Human League	
517	July 17	"Don't You Want Me"	The Human League	
518	July 24	"Eye of the Tiger"	Survivor	
518	July 31	"Eye of the Tiger"	Survivor	
518	August 7	"Eye of the Tiger"	Survivor	
518	August 14	"Eye of the Tiger"	Survivor	
518	August 21	"Eye of the Tiger"	Survivor	
518	August 28	"Eye of the Tiger"	Survivor	
519	September 4	"Abracadabra"	Steve Miller Band	
520	September 11	"Hard to Say I'm Sorry"	Chicago	
520	September 18	"Hard to Say I'm Sorry"	Chicago	
519 (re)	September 25	"Abracadabra"	Steve Miller Band	
521	October 2	"Jack & Diane"	John Cougar	
521	October 9	"Jack & Diane"	John Cougar	
521	October 16	"Jack & Diane"	John Cougar	
521	October 23	"Jack & Diane"	John Cougar	
522	October 30	"Who Can It Be Now?"	Men at Work	
523	November 6	"Up Where We Belong"	Joe Cocker and Jennifer Warnes	
523	November 13	"Up Where We Belong"	Joe Cocker and Jennifer Warnes	
523	November 20	"Up Where We Belong"	Joe Cocker and Jennifer Warnes	
524	November 27	"Truly"	Lionel Richie	
524	December 4	"Truly"	Lionel Richie	
525	December 11	"Mickey"	Toni Basil	
526	December 18	"Maneater"	Daryl Hall & John Oates	
526	December 25	"Maneater"	Daryl Hall & John Oates	

== Number-one artists ==
List of number-one artists by total weeks at number one
Weeks at No. 1	Artist
7	Joan Jett and the Blackhearts
7	Paul McCartney
7	Stevie Wonder
6	The J. Geils Band
6	Survivor
4	Olivia Newton-John
4	John Cougar
3	The Human League
3	Joe Cocker
3	Jennifer Warnes
3	Daryl Hall & John Oates
2	Chicago
2	Steve Miller Band
2	Lionel Richie
1	Vangelis
1	Men at Work
1	Toni Basil

== See also ==
- 1982 in music
- Cash Box Top 100 number-one singles of 1982
- List of Billboard number-one singles
- List of Billboard 200 number-one albums of 1982
- List of Billboard Hot 100 number-one singles of the 1980s
