= List of Billboard 200 number-one albums of 1980 =

These are the Billboard magazine number-one albums of 1980, per the Billboard 200.

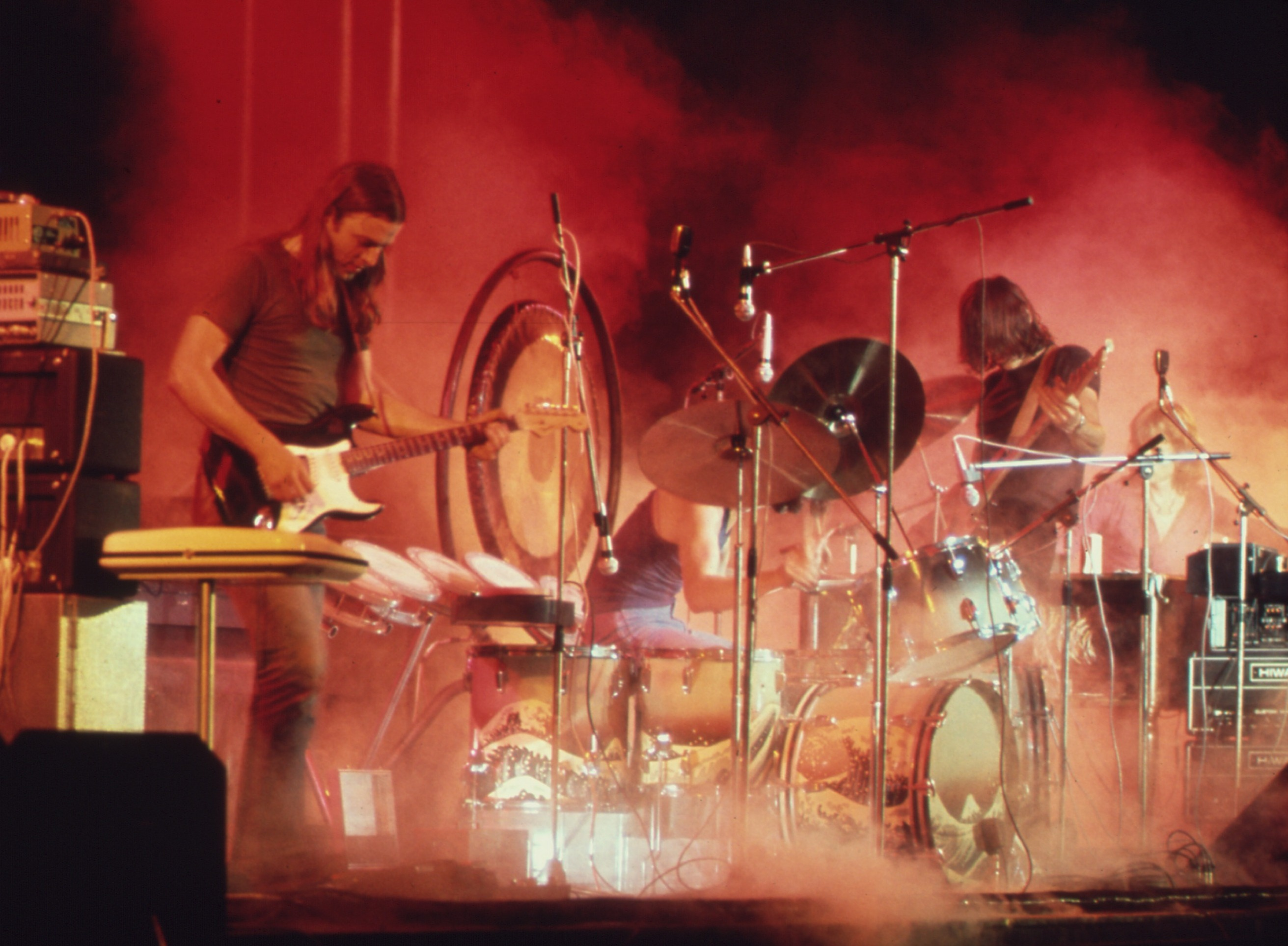
Pink Floyd's The Wall was the best-selling album of 1980, and spent 15 consecutive weeks at number one.

== Chart history ==
Key
†	Indicates best performing album of 1980

Issue date	Album	Artist(s)	Label	Ref.
January 5	On the Radio: Greatest Hits Volumes I & II	Donna Summer	Casablanca	
January 12	Bee Gees Greatest	Bee Gees	RSO	
January 19	The Wall †	Pink Floyd	Columbia	
January 26	The Wall †	Pink Floyd	Columbia	
February 2	The Wall †	Pink Floyd	Columbia	
February 9	The Wall †	Pink Floyd	Columbia	
February 16	The Wall †	Pink Floyd	Columbia	
February 23	The Wall †	Pink Floyd	Columbia	
March 1	The Wall †	Pink Floyd	Columbia	
March 8	The Wall †	Pink Floyd	Columbia	
March 15	The Wall †	Pink Floyd	Columbia	
March 22	The Wall †	Pink Floyd	Columbia	
March 29	The Wall †	Pink Floyd	Columbia	
April 5	The Wall †	Pink Floyd	Columbia	
April 12	The Wall †	Pink Floyd	Columbia	
April 19	The Wall †	Pink Floyd	Columbia	
April 26	The Wall †	Pink Floyd	Columbia	
May 3	Against the Wind	Bob Seger & the Silver Bullet Band	Capitol	
May 10	Against the Wind	Bob Seger & the Silver Bullet Band	Capitol	
May 17	Against the Wind	Bob Seger & the Silver Bullet Band	Capitol	
May 24	Against the Wind	Bob Seger & the Silver Bullet Band	Capitol	
May 31	Against the Wind	Bob Seger & the Silver Bullet Band	Capitol	
June 7	Against the Wind	Bob Seger & the Silver Bullet Band	Capitol	
June 14	Glass Houses	Billy Joel	Columbia	
June 21	Glass Houses	Billy Joel	Columbia	
June 28	Glass Houses	Billy Joel	Columbia	
July 5	Glass Houses	Billy Joel	Columbia	
July 12	Glass Houses	Billy Joel	Columbia	
July 19	Glass Houses	Billy Joel	Columbia	
July 26	Emotional Rescue	The Rolling Stones	Rolling Stones	
August 2	Emotional Rescue	The Rolling Stones	Rolling Stones	
August 9	Emotional Rescue	The Rolling Stones	Rolling Stones	
August 16	Emotional Rescue	The Rolling Stones	Rolling Stones	
August 23	Emotional Rescue	The Rolling Stones	Rolling Stones	
August 30	Emotional Rescue	The Rolling Stones	Rolling Stones	
September 6	Emotional Rescue	The Rolling Stones	Rolling Stones	
September 13	Hold Out	Jackson Browne	Asylum	
September 20	The Game	Queen	Elektra	
September 27	The Game	Queen	Elektra	
October 4	The Game	Queen	Elektra	
October 11	The Game	Queen	Elektra	
October 18	The Game	Queen	Elektra	
October 25	Guilty	Barbra Streisand	Columbia	
November 1	Guilty	Barbra Streisand	Columbia	
November 8	The River	Bruce Springsteen	Columbia	
November 15	The River	Bruce Springsteen	Columbia	
November 22	The River	Bruce Springsteen	Columbia	
November 29	The River	Bruce Springsteen	Columbia	
December 6	Guilty	Barbra Streisand	Columbia	
December 13	Kenny Rogers' Greatest Hits	Kenny Rogers	Liberty	
December 20	Kenny Rogers' Greatest Hits	Kenny Rogers	Liberty	
December 27	Double Fantasy	John Lennon and Yoko Ono	Geffen	

== See also ==
- 1980 in music
- List of number-one albums (United States)
