= List of Billboard 200 number-one albums of 1966 =

These are the Billboard magazine number-one albums of 1966, per the Billboard 200.

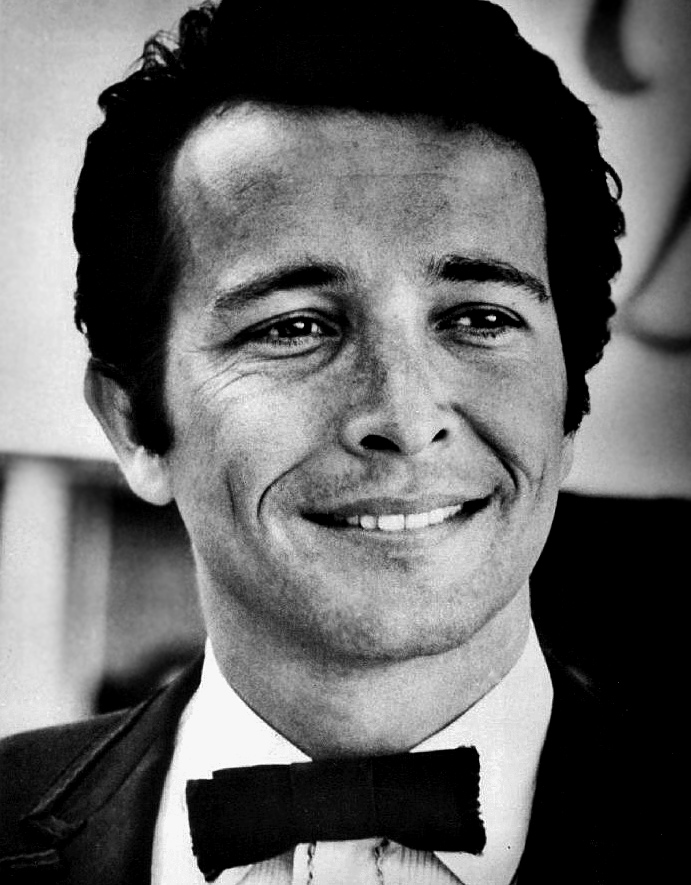
Herb Alpert and the Tijuana Brass had three number one albums in 1966, Whipped Cream & Other Delights (the best-selling album of the year), Going Places and What Now My Love, which spent a cumulative 18 weeks at number one.

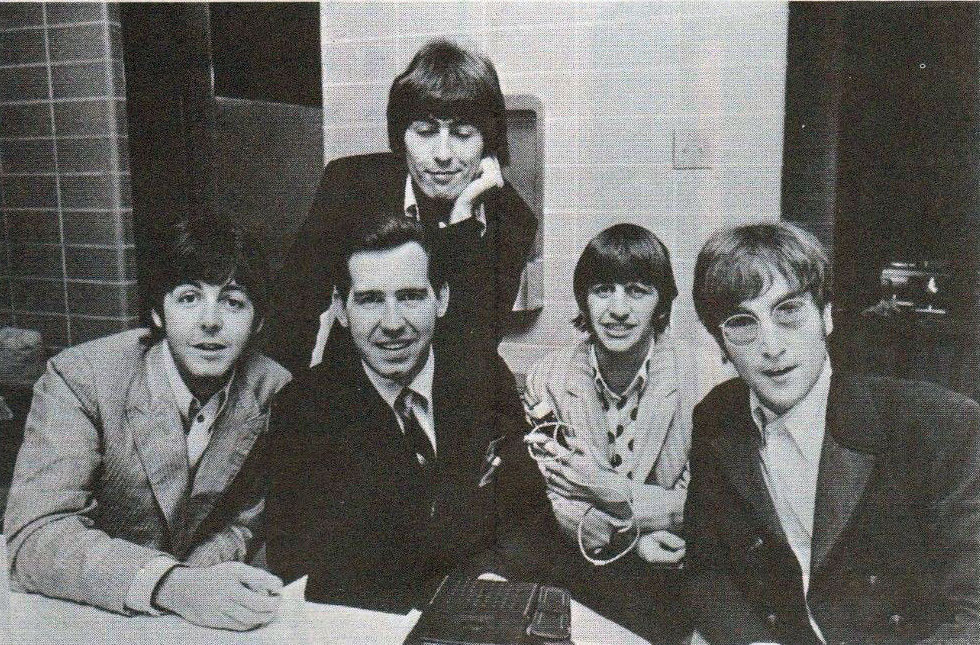
The Beatles had three number one albums in 1966, Rubber Soul, Yesterday and Today and Revolver, which spent a cumulative 17 weeks at number one.

== Chart history ==
Key
†	Indicates best performing album of 1966

Issue date	Album	Artist(s)	Label	Ref.
January 1	Whipped Cream & Other Delights †	Herb Alpert's Tijuana Brass	A&M	
January 8	Rubber Soul	The Beatles	Capitol	
January 15	Rubber Soul	The Beatles	Capitol	
January 22	Rubber Soul	The Beatles	Capitol	
January 29	Rubber Soul	The Beatles	Capitol	
February 5	Rubber Soul	The Beatles	Capitol	
February 12	Rubber Soul	The Beatles	Capitol	
February 19	Whipped Cream and Other Delights †	Herb Alpert's Tijuana Brass	A&M	
February 26	Whipped Cream and Other Delights †	Herb Alpert's Tijuana Brass	A&M	
March 5	Going Places	Herb Alpert and the Tijuana Brass	A&M	
March 12	Ballads of the Green Berets	SSgt. Barry Sadler	RCA Victor	
March 19	Ballads of the Green Berets	SSgt. Barry Sadler	RCA Victor	
March 26	Ballads of the Green Berets	SSgt. Barry Sadler	RCA Victor	
April 2	Ballads of the Green Berets	SSgt. Barry Sadler	RCA Victor	
April 9	Ballads of the Green Berets	SSgt. Barry Sadler	RCA Victor	
April 16	Going Places	Herb Alpert and the Tijuana Brass	A&M	
April 23	Going Places	Herb Alpert and the Tijuana Brass	A&M	
April 30	Going Places	Herb Alpert and the Tijuana Brass	A&M	
May 7	Going Places	Herb Alpert and the Tijuana Brass	A&M	
May 14	Going Places	Herb Alpert and the Tijuana Brass	A&M	
May 21	If You Can Believe Your Eyes and Ears	The Mamas & the Papas	Dunhill	
May 28	What Now My Love	Herb Alpert and the Tijuana Brass	A&M	
June 4	What Now My Love	Herb Alpert and the Tijuana Brass	A&M	
June 11	What Now My Love	Herb Alpert and the Tijuana Brass	A&M	
June 18	What Now My Love	Herb Alpert and the Tijuana Brass	A&M	
June 25	What Now My Love	Herb Alpert and the Tijuana Brass	A&M	
July 2	What Now My Love	Herb Alpert and the Tijuana Brass	A&M	
July 9	What Now My Love	Herb Alpert and the Tijuana Brass	A&M	
July 16	What Now My Love	Herb Alpert and the Tijuana Brass	A&M	
July 23	Strangers in the Night	Frank Sinatra	Reprise	
July 30	Yesterday and Today	The Beatles	Capitol	
August 6	Yesterday and Today	The Beatles	Capitol	
August 13	Yesterday and Today	The Beatles	Capitol	
August 20	Yesterday and Today	The Beatles	Capitol	
August 27	Yesterday and Today	The Beatles	Capitol	
September 3	What Now My Love	Herb Alpert and the Tijuana Brass	A&M	
September 10	Revolver	The Beatles	Capitol	
September 17	Revolver	The Beatles	Capitol	
September 24	Revolver	The Beatles	Capitol	
October 1	Revolver	The Beatles	Capitol	
October 8	Revolver	The Beatles	Capitol	
October 15	Revolver	The Beatles	Capitol	
October 22	The Supremes A' Go-Go	The Supremes	Motown	
October 29	The Supremes A' Go-Go	The Supremes	Motown	
November 5	Doctor Zhivago	Soundtrack	MGM	
November 12	The Monkees	The Monkees	Colgems	
November 19	The Monkees	The Monkees	Colgems	
November 26	The Monkees	The Monkees	Colgems	
December 3	The Monkees	The Monkees	Colgems	
December 10	The Monkees	The Monkees	Colgems	
December 17	The Monkees	The Monkees	Colgems	
December 24	The Monkees	The Monkees	Colgems	
December 31	The Monkees	The Monkees	Colgems	

== See also ==
- 1966 in music
- List of number-one albums (United States)
