= List of Billboard 200 number-one albums of 1965 =

These are the Billboard magazine number-one albums of 1965, per the Billboard 200.

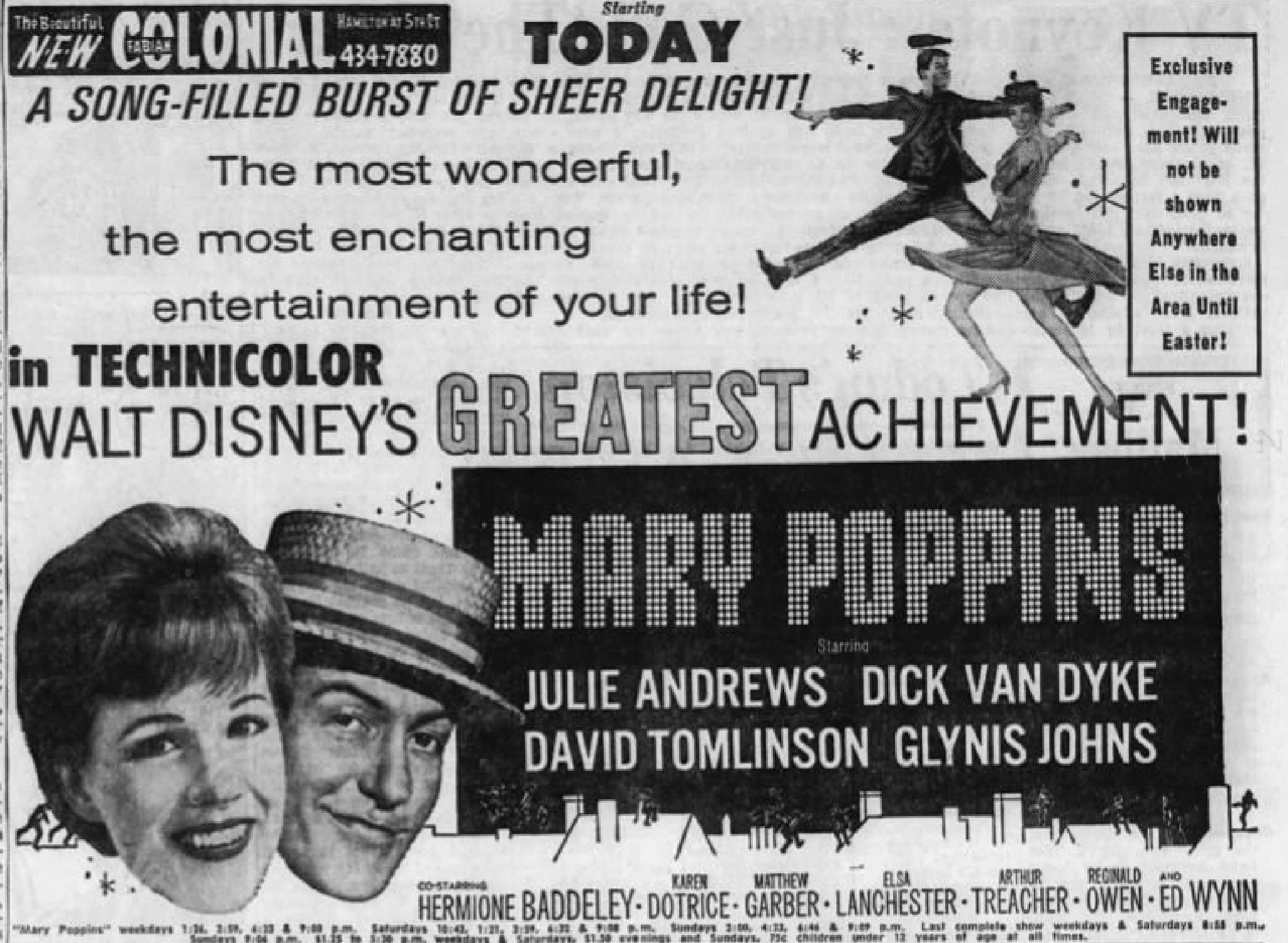
The Mary Poppins soundtrack was the best-selling album of 1965, and spent 14 weeks at number one, 13 of them consecutive.

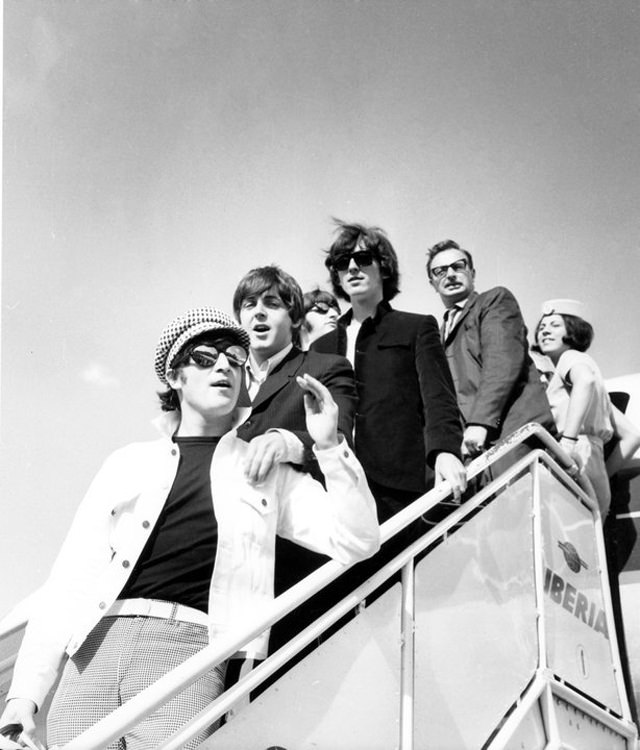
The Beatles had three number one albums in 1965, Beatles '65, Beatles VI and Help!, which spent a cumulative 24 weeks at number one.

== Chart history ==
Key
†	Indicates best performing album of 1965

Issue date	Album	Artist(s)	Label	Ref.
January 2	Roustabout	Elvis Presley / Soundtrack	RCA Victor	
January 9	Beatles '65	The Beatles	Capitol	
January 16	Beatles '65	The Beatles	Capitol	
January 23	Beatles '65	The Beatles	Capitol	
January 30	Beatles '65	The Beatles	Capitol	
February 6	Beatles '65	The Beatles	Capitol	
February 13	Beatles '65	The Beatles	Capitol	
February 20	Beatles '65	The Beatles	Capitol	
February 27	Beatles '65	The Beatles	Capitol	
March 6	Beatles '65	The Beatles	Capitol	
March 13	Mary Poppins †	Soundtrack	Buena Vista	
March 20	Goldfinger	Soundtrack	United Artists	
March 27	Goldfinger	Soundtrack	United Artists	
April 3	Goldfinger	Soundtrack	United Artists	
April 10	Mary Poppins †	Soundtrack	Buena Vista	
April 17	Mary Poppins †	Soundtrack	Buena Vista	
April 24	Mary Poppins †	Soundtrack	Buena Vista	
May 1	Mary Poppins †	Soundtrack	Buena Vista	
May 8	Mary Poppins †	Soundtrack	Buena Vista	
May 15	Mary Poppins †	Soundtrack	Buena Vista	
May 22	Mary Poppins †	Soundtrack	Buena Vista	
May 29	Mary Poppins †	Soundtrack	Buena Vista	
June 5	Mary Poppins †	Soundtrack	Buena Vista	
June 12	Mary Poppins †	Soundtrack	Buena Vista	
June 19	Mary Poppins †	Soundtrack	Buena Vista	
June 26	Mary Poppins †	Soundtrack	Buena Vista	
July 3	Mary Poppins †	Soundtrack	Buena Vista	
July 10	Beatles VI	The Beatles	Capitol	
July 17	Beatles VI	The Beatles	Capitol	
July 24	Beatles VI	The Beatles	Capitol	
July 31	Beatles VI	The Beatles	Capitol	
August 7	Beatles VI	The Beatles	Capitol	
August 14	Beatles VI	The Beatles	Capitol	
August 21	Out of Our Heads	The Rolling Stones	London	
August 28	Out of Our Heads	The Rolling Stones	London	
September 4	Out of Our Heads	The Rolling Stones	London	
September 11	Help!	The Beatles / Soundtrack	Capitol	
September 18	Help!	The Beatles / Soundtrack	Capitol	
September 25	Help!	The Beatles / Soundtrack	Capitol	
October 2	Help!	The Beatles / Soundtrack	Capitol	
October 9	Help!	The Beatles / Soundtrack	Capitol	
October 16	Help!	The Beatles / Soundtrack	Capitol	
October 23	Help!	The Beatles / Soundtrack	Capitol	
October 30	Help!	The Beatles / Soundtrack	Capitol	
November 6	Help!	The Beatles / Soundtrack	Capitol	
November 13	The Sound of Music	Soundtrack	RCA Victor	
November 20	The Sound of Music	Soundtrack	RCA Victor	
November 27	Whipped Cream & Other Delights	Herb Alpert's Tijuana Brass	A&M	
December 4	Whipped Cream & Other Delights	Herb Alpert's Tijuana Brass	A&M	
December 11	Whipped Cream & Other Delights	Herb Alpert's Tijuana Brass	A&M	
December 18	Whipped Cream & Other Delights	Herb Alpert's Tijuana Brass	A&M	
December 25	Whipped Cream & Other Delights	Herb Alpert's Tijuana Brass	A&M	

== See also ==
- 1965 in music
- List of number-one albums (United States)
