= List of Billboard 200 number-one albums of 1970 =

These are the Billboard magazine number-one albums for each week in 1970.

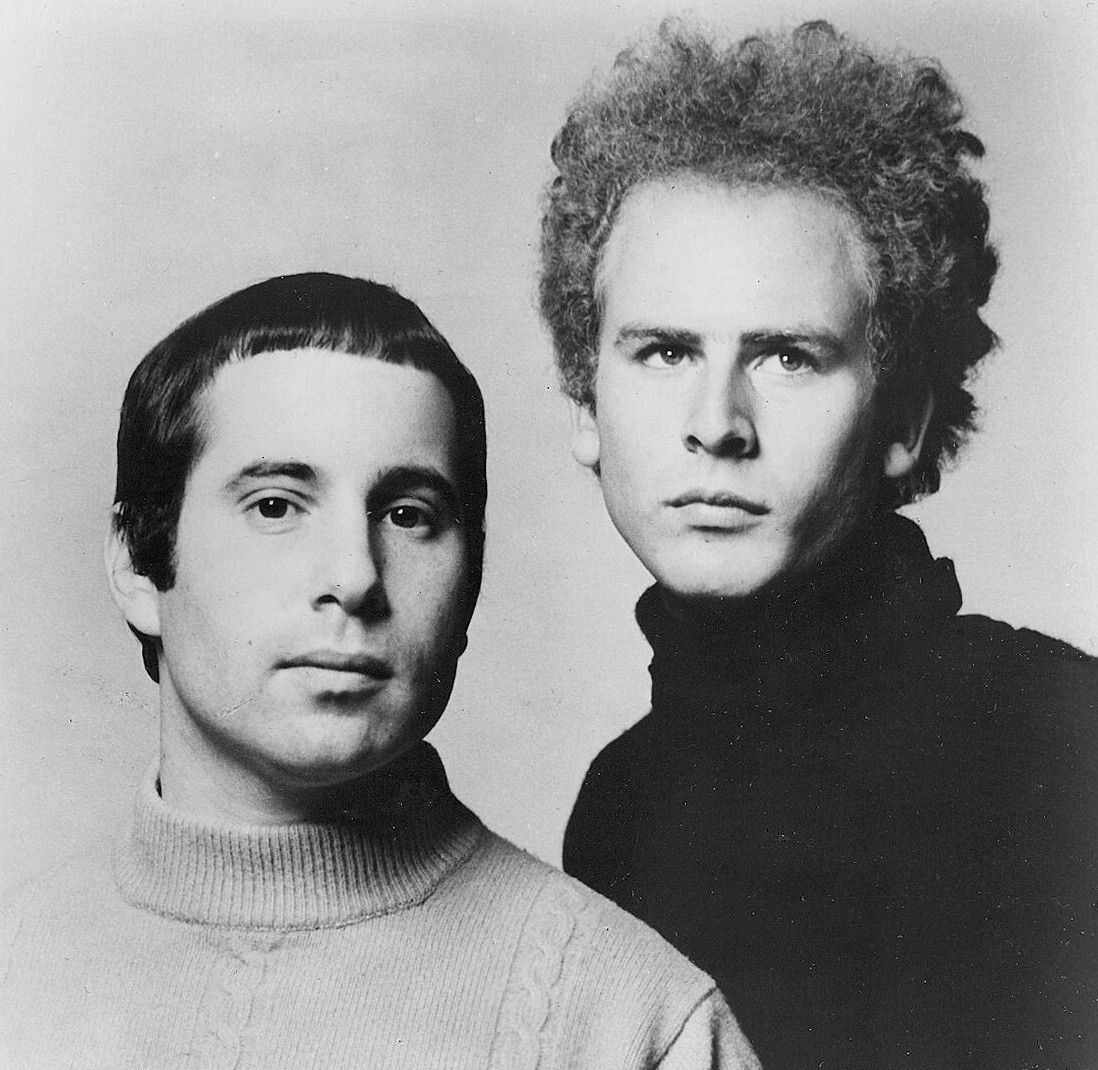
Bridge over Troubled Water by Simon & Garfunkel was the best-selling album of 1970, spending ten consecutive weeks at number one.

== Chart history ==
Key
| † | Indicates best performing album of 1970 |

| Issue date | Album | Artist(s) | Label | Ref. |
|---|---|---|---|---|
| January 3 | Abbey Road | The Beatles | Apple | |
| January 10 | Abbey Road | The Beatles | Apple | |
| January 17 | Led Zeppelin II | Led Zeppelin | Atlantic | |
| January 24 | Abbey Road | The Beatles | Apple | |
| January 31 | Led Zeppelin II | Led Zeppelin | Atlantic | |
| February 7 | Led Zeppelin II | Led Zeppelin | Atlantic | |
| February 14 | Led Zeppelin II | Led Zeppelin | Atlantic | |
| February 21 | Led Zeppelin II | Led Zeppelin | Atlantic | |
| February 28 | Led Zeppelin II | Led Zeppelin | Atlantic | |
| March 7 | Bridge over Troubled Water † | Simon & Garfunkel | Columbia | |
| March 14 | Bridge over Troubled Water † | Simon & Garfunkel | Columbia | |
| March 21 | Bridge over Troubled Water † | Simon & Garfunkel | Columbia | |
| March 28 | Bridge over Troubled Water † | Simon & Garfunkel | Columbia | |
| April 4 | Bridge over Troubled Water † | Simon & Garfunkel | Columbia | |
| April 11 | Bridge over Troubled Water † | Simon & Garfunkel | Columbia | |
| April 18 | Bridge over Troubled Water † | Simon & Garfunkel | Columbia | |
| April 25 | Bridge over Troubled Water † | Simon & Garfunkel | Columbia | |
| May 2 | Bridge over Troubled Water † | Simon & Garfunkel | Columbia | |
| May 9 | Bridge over Troubled Water † | Simon & Garfunkel | Columbia | |
| May 16 | Déjà Vu | Crosby, Stills, Nash & Young | Atlantic | |
| May 23 | McCartney | Paul McCartney | Apple | |
| May 30 | McCartney | Paul McCartney | Apple | |
| June 6 | McCartney | Paul McCartney | Apple | |
| June 13 | Let It Be | The Beatles | Apple | |
| June 20 | Let It Be | The Beatles | Apple | |
| June 27 | Let It Be | The Beatles | Apple | |
| July 4 | Let It Be | The Beatles | Apple | |
| July 11 | Woodstock | Soundtrack | Cotillion | |
| July 18 | Woodstock | Soundtrack | Cotillion | |
| July 25 | Woodstock | Soundtrack | Cotillion | |
| August 1 | Woodstock | Soundtrack | Cotillion | |
| August 8 | Blood, Sweat & Tears 3 | Blood, Sweat & Tears | Columbia | |
| August 15 | Blood, Sweat & Tears 3 | Blood, Sweat & Tears | Columbia | |
| August 22 | Cosmo's Factory | Creedence Clearwater Revival | Fantasy | |
| August 29 | Cosmo's Factory | Creedence Clearwater Revival | Fantasy | |
| September 5 | Cosmo's Factory | Creedence Clearwater Revival | Fantasy | |
| September 12 | Cosmo's Factory | Creedence Clearwater Revival | Fantasy | |
| September 19 | Cosmo's Factory | Creedence Clearwater Revival | Fantasy | |
| September 26 | Cosmo's Factory | Creedence Clearwater Revival | Fantasy | |
| October 3 | Cosmo's Factory | Creedence Clearwater Revival | Fantasy | |
| October 10 | Cosmo's Factory | Creedence Clearwater Revival | Fantasy | |
| October 17 | Cosmo's Factory | Creedence Clearwater Revival | Fantasy | |
| October 24 | Abraxas | Santana | Columbia | |
| October 31 | Led Zeppelin III | Led Zeppelin | Atlantic | |
| November 7 | Led Zeppelin III | Led Zeppelin | Atlantic | |
| November 14 | Led Zeppelin III | Led Zeppelin | Atlantic | |
| November 21 | Led Zeppelin III | Led Zeppelin | Atlantic | |
| November 28 | Abraxas | Santana | Columbia | |
| December 5 | Abraxas | Santana | Columbia | |
| December 12 | Abraxas | Santana | Columbia | |
| December 19 | Abraxas | Santana | Columbia | |
| December 26 | Abraxas | Santana | Columbia | |

== See also ==
- 1970 in music
- List of number-one albums (United States)
