= Sounds Like... =

Studio album by Herb Alpert & the Tijuana Brass
- Released: May 1, 1967
- Recorded: 1967
- Studio: Gold Star (Hollywood, California)
- Genre: Easy listening, jazz pop
- Length: 27:21
- Label: A&M; A&M 212001
- Producer: Herb Alpert, Jerry Moss

Herb Alpert & the Tijuana Brass chronology
S.R.O. (1966)	Sounds Like... (1967)	Herb Alpert's Ninth (1967)

Sounds Like... is a 1967 album by the group Herb Alpert & the Tijuana Brass. It is the group's eighth album.

== Background ==
Sounds Like... entered the Billboard magazine Top LPs chart in June 1967 and remained on the chart for 53 weeks, topping at #1 two weeks after its release.

According to liner notes in the 2006 Shout!Factory CD release, the title theme for the 1967 James Bond spoof Casino Royale was originally recorded with vocals, but Bacharach was dissatisfied with the recording. He sent the tapes to Herb Alpert, who overdubbed some trumpets, and some Tijuana Brass instruments (most prominently marimba and percussion) and sent the song back to Bacharach. This version, with the Bacharach orchestra, rather than the Brass members, providing most of the backing, is the one included on the Sounds Like... album.

Released as a single, "Wade in the Water" spent five weeks on the Billboard Hot 100, rising to #37. The single spent seven weeks on the Easy Listening chart, topping out at #5. According to Herb Alpert, "Wade in the Water" was a popular concert number, and was featured in the group's first television special in 1967.

== Critical reception ==
Professional ratings
Review scores
Source	Rating
Allmusic	3/5 stars

In a retrospective review for Allmusic, music critic Richard S. Ginell wrote the album was "fresh and musical and downright joyous" and describes "Casino Royale" as "an artifact of '60s pop culture, to be sure, but still a perfectly structured record."

== Track listing ==
=== Side 1 ===
1. "Gotta Lotta Livin' to Do" (Lee Adams, Charles Strouse) - 2:47
2. "Lady Godiva" (Charlie Mills, Mike Leander) - 2:06
3. "Bo-Bo" (Sol Lake) - 3:04
4. "Shades of Blue" (Julius Wechter) - 2:44
5. "In a Little Spanish Town" (Mabel Wayne, Joe Young, Sam M. Lewis) - 1:54
6. "Wade in the Water" (Traditional, arranged by John Pisano, Edmondson and Alpert) - 3:03

=== Side 2 ===
1. "Town Without Pity" (Dimitri Tiomkin, Ned Washington) - 2:14
2. "The Charmer" (John Pisano) - 2:13
3. "Treasure of San Miguel" (Roger Nichols) - 2:14
4. "Miss Frenchy Brown" (Ervan Coleman) - 2:27
5. "Casino Royale" (Hal David, Burt Bacharach) - 2:35

== Charts ==
Chart (1967)	Peak position
US Billboard Top LPs	1

== See also ==
- List of Billboard 200 number-one albums of 1967
