= List of Billboard number-one albums of 1959 =

These are the number-one albums in the United States per Billboard magazine's Best-Selling LPs chart during the year 1959. Starting May 25, 1959, separate charts were listed for albums in mono and stereo formats, called Best-Selling Monophonic LPs and Best-Selling Stereophonic LPs, respectively.

Key
†	Indicates best performing album of 1959

== Chart history through May 18 ==
Issue date	Album	Artist(s)	Label	Ref.
January 5	Christmas Sing Along with Mitch	Mitch Miller	Columbia	
January 12	Sing Along with Mitch	Mitch Miller	Columbia	
January 19	Sing Along with Mitch	Mitch Miller	Columbia	
January 26	Sing Along with Mitch	Mitch Miller	Columbia	
February 2	Flower Drum Song	Original Cast	Columbia	
February 9	Flower Drum Song	Original Cast	Columbia	
February 16	Flower Drum Song	Original Cast	Columbia	
February 23	The Music from Peter Gunn †	Henry Mancini & His Orchestra / Soundtrack	RCA Victor	
March 2	The Music from Peter Gunn †	Henry Mancini & His Orchestra / Soundtrack	RCA Victor	
March 9	The Music from Peter Gunn †	Henry Mancini & His Orchestra / Soundtrack	RCA Victor	
March 16	The Music from Peter Gunn †	Henry Mancini & His Orchestra / Soundtrack	RCA Victor	
March 23	The Music from Peter Gunn †	Henry Mancini & His Orchestra / Soundtrack	RCA Victor	
March 30	The Music from Peter Gunn †	Henry Mancini & His Orchestra / Soundtrack	RCA Victor	
April 6	The Music from Peter Gunn †	Henry Mancini & His Orchestra / Soundtrack	RCA Victor	
April 13	The Music from Peter Gunn †	Henry Mancini & His Orchestra / Soundtrack	RCA Victor	
April 20	The Music from Peter Gunn †	Henry Mancini & His Orchestra / Soundtrack	RCA Victor	
April 27	The Music from Peter Gunn †	Henry Mancini & His Orchestra / Soundtrack	RCA Victor	
May 4	Gigi	Soundtrack	MGM	
May 11	Gigi	Soundtrack	MGM	
May 18	Gigi	Soundtrack	MGM	

== Chart history May 25 to end of year ==
Chart history
Issue date	Mono			Stereo			Ref.
Issue date	Album	Artist(s)	Label	Album	Artist(s)	Label	Ref.
May 25	Gigi	Soundtrack	MGM	South Pacific	Soundtrack	RCA Victor	
June 1	Gigi	Soundtrack	MGM	South Pacific	Soundtrack	RCA Victor	
June 8	Gigi	Soundtrack	MGM	South Pacific	Soundtrack	RCA Victor	
June 15	Gigi	Soundtrack	MGM	My Fair Lady	Original London Cast	Columbia	
June 22	Exotica	Martin Denny	Liberty	My Fair Lady	Original London Cast	Columbia	
June 29	Exotica	Martin Denny	Liberty	My Fair Lady	Original London Cast	Columbia	
July 6	Exotica	Martin Denny	Liberty	South Pacific	Soundtrack	RCA Victor	
July 13	Exotica	Martin Denny	Liberty	Film Encores	Mantovani	London	
July 20	Exotica	Martin Denny	Liberty	South Pacific	Soundtrack	RCA Victor	
July 27	The Kingston Trio at Large	The Kingston Trio	Capitol	South Pacific	Soundtrack	RCA Victor	
August 3	The Kingston Trio at Large	The Kingston Trio	Capitol	South Pacific	Soundtrack	RCA Victor	
August 10	The Kingston Trio at Large	The Kingston Trio	Capitol	South Pacific	Soundtrack	RCA Victor	
August 17	The Kingston Trio at Large	The Kingston Trio	Capitol	South Pacific	Soundtrack	RCA Victor	
August 24	The Kingston Trio at Large	The Kingston Trio	Capitol	South Pacific	Soundtrack	RCA Victor	
August 31	The Kingston Trio at Large	The Kingston Trio	Capitol	South Pacific	Soundtrack	RCA Victor	
September 7	The Kingston Trio at Large	The Kingston Trio	Capitol	South Pacific	Soundtrack	RCA Victor	
September 14	The Kingston Trio at Large	The Kingston Trio	Capitol	South Pacific	Soundtrack	RCA Victor	
September 21	The Kingston Trio at Large	The Kingston Trio	Capitol	South Pacific	Soundtrack	RCA Victor	
September 28	The Kingston Trio at Large	The Kingston Trio	Capitol	South Pacific	Soundtrack	RCA Victor	
October 5	The Kingston Trio at Large	The Kingston Trio	Capitol	South Pacific	Soundtrack	RCA Victor	
October 12	The Kingston Trio at Large	The Kingston Trio	Capitol	South Pacific	Soundtrack	RCA Victor	
October 19	The Kingston Trio at Large	The Kingston Trio	Capitol	South Pacific	Soundtrack	RCA Victor	
October 26	The Kingston Trio at Large	The Kingston Trio	Capitol	South Pacific	Soundtrack	RCA Victor	
November 2	The Kingston Trio at Large	The Kingston Trio	Capitol	South Pacific	Soundtrack	RCA Victor	
November 9	Heavenly	Johnny Mathis	Columbia	South Pacific	Soundtrack	RCA Victor	
November 16	Heavenly	Johnny Mathis	Columbia	South Pacific	Soundtrack	RCA Victor	
November 23	Heavenly	Johnny Mathis	Columbia	South Pacific	Soundtrack	RCA Victor	
November 30	Heavenly	Johnny Mathis	Columbia	South Pacific	Soundtrack	RCA Victor	
December 7	Heavenly	Johnny Mathis	Columbia	South Pacific	Soundtrack	RCA Victor	
December 14	Here We Go Again!	The Kingston Trio	Capitol	South Pacific	Soundtrack	RCA Victor	
December 21	Here We Go Again!	The Kingston Trio	Capitol	South Pacific	Soundtrack	RCA Victor	
December 28	Here We Go Again!	The Kingston Trio	Capitol	South Pacific	Soundtrack	RCA Victor	

== See also ==
- List of number-one albums (United States)
