= Living Loving Maid (She's Just a Woman) =

- Japanese single picture sleeve

Single by Led Zeppelin

from the album Led Zeppelin II
- A-side: "Whole Lotta Love" (US)
- B-side: "Bring It on Home" (Japan)
- Released: 7 November 1969 (US)
- Recorded: 25 June 1969
- Studio: Morgan, London
- Genre: Hard rock
- Length: 2:40
- Label: Atlantic
- Songwriters: Jimmy Page, Robert Plant
- Producer: Jimmy Page

Led Zeppelin singles chronology
| "Good Times Bad Times" (1969) | "Living Loving Maid (She's Just a Woman)" (1969) | "Immigrant Song" (1970) |

"Living Loving Maid (She's Just a Woman)" is a song by English rock band Led Zeppelin from their album Led Zeppelin II, released in 1969. It was also released as a single in Japan and as the B-side of the single "Whole Lotta Love" in the United States.

This song immediately follows "Heartbreaker" on side 2 of Led Zeppelin II and radio stations have traditionally played them together in succession.

The song reached the charts in the US (Hot 100 No. 65) and Japan (Oricon No. 93).

== Background and composition ==
The song is about a groupie who stalked the band early in their career, who guitarist Jimmy Page described as "a degenerate old woman trying desperately to be young." Along with vocalist Robert Plant, Page has expressed his distaste for the track, and has called it his least favourite Led Zeppelin song. Consequently, the song was never performed live in concert. The song's music has been characterized by its "snaking" guitar riff and "catchy feel." The song makes use of ascending chord sequences. The song contains a guitar solo in its mid-section performed by Page.

== Personnel ==
According to Jean-Michel Guesdon and Philippe Margotin:

- Robert Plant – vocals, vocal harmonies
- Jimmy Page – guitars
- John Paul Jones – bass
- John Bohnam – drums

== See also ==
- List of cover versions of Led Zeppelin songs § Living Loving Maid

== Bibliography ==
- Guesdon, Jean-Michel; Margotin, Philippe (2018). Led Zeppelin All the Songs: The Story Behind Every Track. Running Press. ISBN 978-0-316-448-67-3.
