= List of Billboard 200 number-one albums of 1982 =

The Billboard 200, published in Billboard magazine, is a weekly chart that ranks the 200 highest-selling music albums and EPs in the United States. Before Nielsen SoundScan began tracking sales in 1991, Billboard estimated the sales for the album charts from a representative sampling of record stores nationwide, which was gathered by telephone, fax or messenger service. The data was based on reports from record stores, who ranked the popularity of the best-selling records but did not provide any actual sales figures.

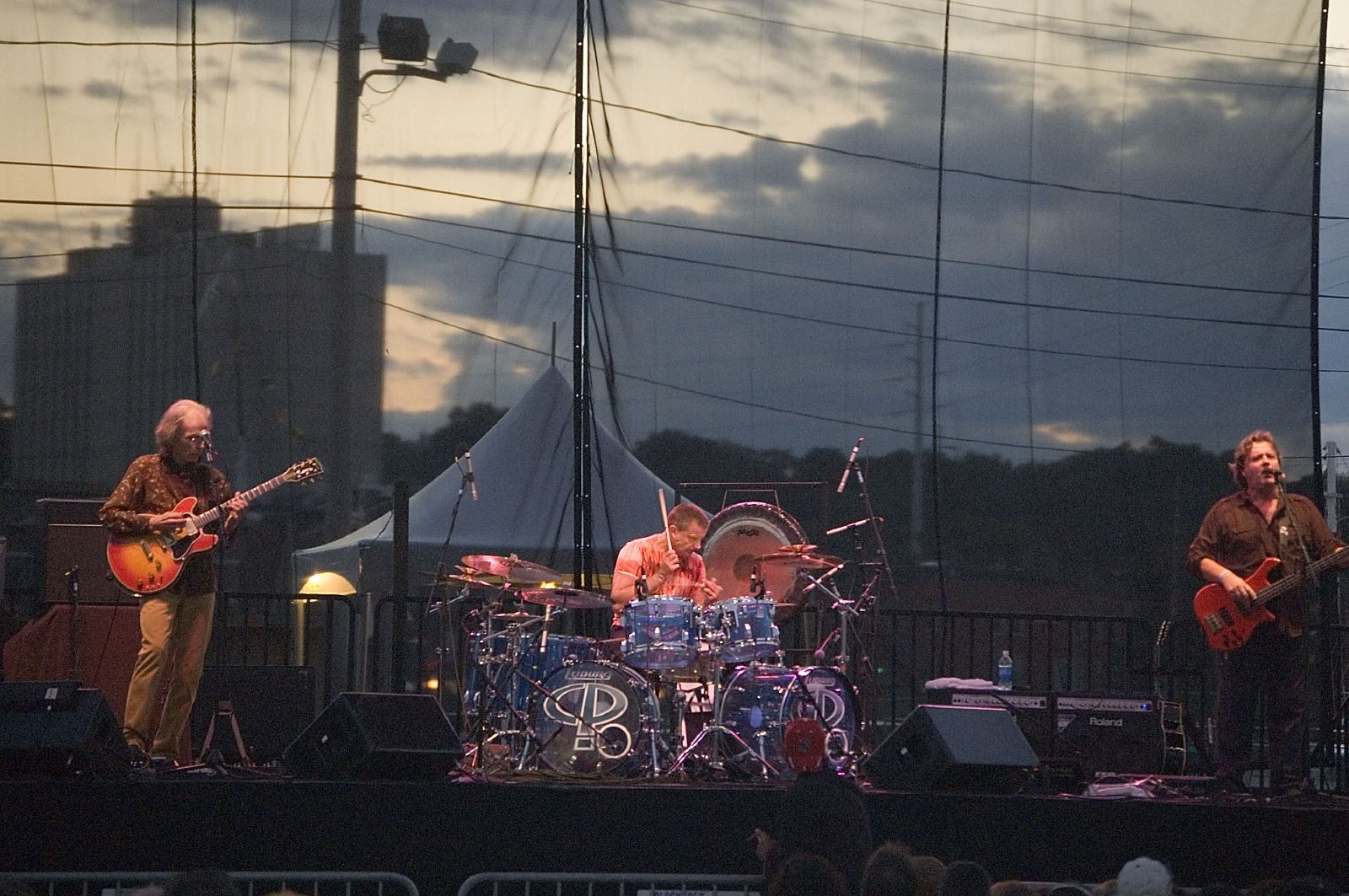
Asia's self-titled debut album was the best-selling album of 1982, and spent nine non-consecutive weeks at number one.

== Chart history ==
Key
†	Indicates best performing album of 1982

Issue date	Album	Artist(s)	Label	Ref.
January 2	For Those About to Rock We Salute You	AC/DC	Atlantic	
January 9	For Those About to Rock We Salute You	AC/DC	Atlantic	
January 16	4	Foreigner	Atlantic	
January 23	4	Foreigner	Atlantic	
January 30	4	Foreigner	Atlantic	
February 6	Freeze Frame	The J. Geils Band	EMI America	
February 13	Freeze Frame	The J. Geils Band	EMI America	
February 20	Freeze Frame	The J. Geils Band	EMI America	
February 27	Freeze Frame	The J. Geils Band	EMI America	
March 6	Beauty and the Beat	Go-Go’s	I.R.S.	
March 13	Beauty and the Beat	Go-Go’s	I.R.S.	
March 20	Beauty and the Beat	Go-Go’s	I.R.S.	
March 27	Beauty and the Beat	Go-Go’s	I.R.S.	
April 3	Beauty and the Beat	Go-Go’s	I.R.S.	
April 10	Beauty and the Beat	Go-Go’s	I.R.S.	
April 17	Chariots of Fire	Vangelis / Soundtrack	Polydor	
April 24	Chariots of Fire	Vangelis / Soundtrack	Polydor	
May 1	Chariots of Fire	Vangelis / Soundtrack	Polydor	
May 8	Chariots of Fire	Vangelis / Soundtrack	Polydor	
May 15	Asia †	Asia	Geffen	
May 22	Asia †	Asia	Geffen	
May 29	Tug of War	Paul McCartney	Columbia	
June 5	Tug of War	Paul McCartney	Columbia	
June 12	Tug of War	Paul McCartney	Columbia	
June 19	Asia †	Asia	Geffen	
June 26	Asia †	Asia	Geffen	
July 3	Asia †	Asia	Geffen	
July 10	Asia †	Asia	Geffen	
July 17	Asia †	Asia	Geffen	
July 24	Asia †	Asia	Geffen	
July 31	Asia †	Asia	Geffen	
August 7	Mirage	Fleetwood Mac	Warner Bros.	
August 14	Mirage	Fleetwood Mac	Warner Bros.	
August 21	Mirage	Fleetwood Mac	Warner Bros.	
August 28	Mirage	Fleetwood Mac	Warner Bros.	
September 4	Mirage	Fleetwood Mac	Warner Bros.	
September 11	American Fool	John Cougar	Riva	
September 18	American Fool	John Cougar	Riva	
September 25	American Fool	John Cougar	Riva	
October 2	American Fool	John Cougar	Riva	
October 9	American Fool	John Cougar	Riva	
October 16	American Fool	John Cougar	Riva	
October 23	American Fool	John Cougar	Riva	
October 30	American Fool	John Cougar	Riva	
November 6	American Fool	John Cougar	Riva	
November 13	Business as Usual	Men at Work	Columbia	
November 20	Business as Usual	Men at Work	Columbia	
November 27	Business as Usual	Men at Work	Columbia	
December 4	Business as Usual	Men at Work	Columbia	
December 11	Business as Usual	Men at Work	Columbia	
December 18	Business as Usual	Men at Work	Columbia	
December 25	Business as Usual	Men at Work	Columbia	

== See also ==
- Hot 100 number-one hits of 1982 (United States)
- 1982 in music
- List of number-one albums (United States)
