= The Lord's Prayer (Mormon Tabernacle Choir album) =

Studio album by Mormon Tabernacle Choir
- Released: 1959
- Genre: Christian music
- Label: Columbia Masterworks

The Lord's Prayer is an album by the Mormon Tabernacle Choir directed by Dr. Richard P. Condie and backed by Eugene Ormandy and the Philadelphia Orchestra. Alexander Schreiner and Frank W. Asper are the organists. It was released in 1959 on the Columbia Masterworks label (catalog nos. MS-6068).

The album included "Battle Hymn of the Republic" which was released as a single and reached No. 9 on the Billboard singles chart.

The album debuted on Billboard magazine's popular albums chart on October 19, 1959, peaked at No. 1, and remained on that chart for 38 weeks. It was certified as a gold record by the RIAA.

== Track listing ==
Side 1

1. "The Lord's Prayer" (Robertson)
2. "Come, Come Ye Saints" (Robertson)
3. "Blessed Are They That Mourn" (Brahms)
4. "O, My Father" (Gates)

Side 2

1. "How Great the Wisdom and the Love" (Thomas McIntyre)
2. "Holy, Holy, Holy" (Gounod)
3. "148th Psalm" (Holst)
4. "For Unto Us a Child Is Born" from the "Messiah" (Handel)
5. "David's Lamentation" (Billings, arranged by E. Siegmeister)
6. "Londonderry Air" (arranged by Ralph Baldwin)
7. "Battle Hymn of the Republic" (Wilhousky)
