= List of Billboard 200 number-one albums of 1967 =

These are the Billboard magazine number-one albums of 1967, per the Billboard 200. May 13, 1967 was the first chart to list 200 albums, however the chart name didn't change to Billboard 200 until September 7, 1991.

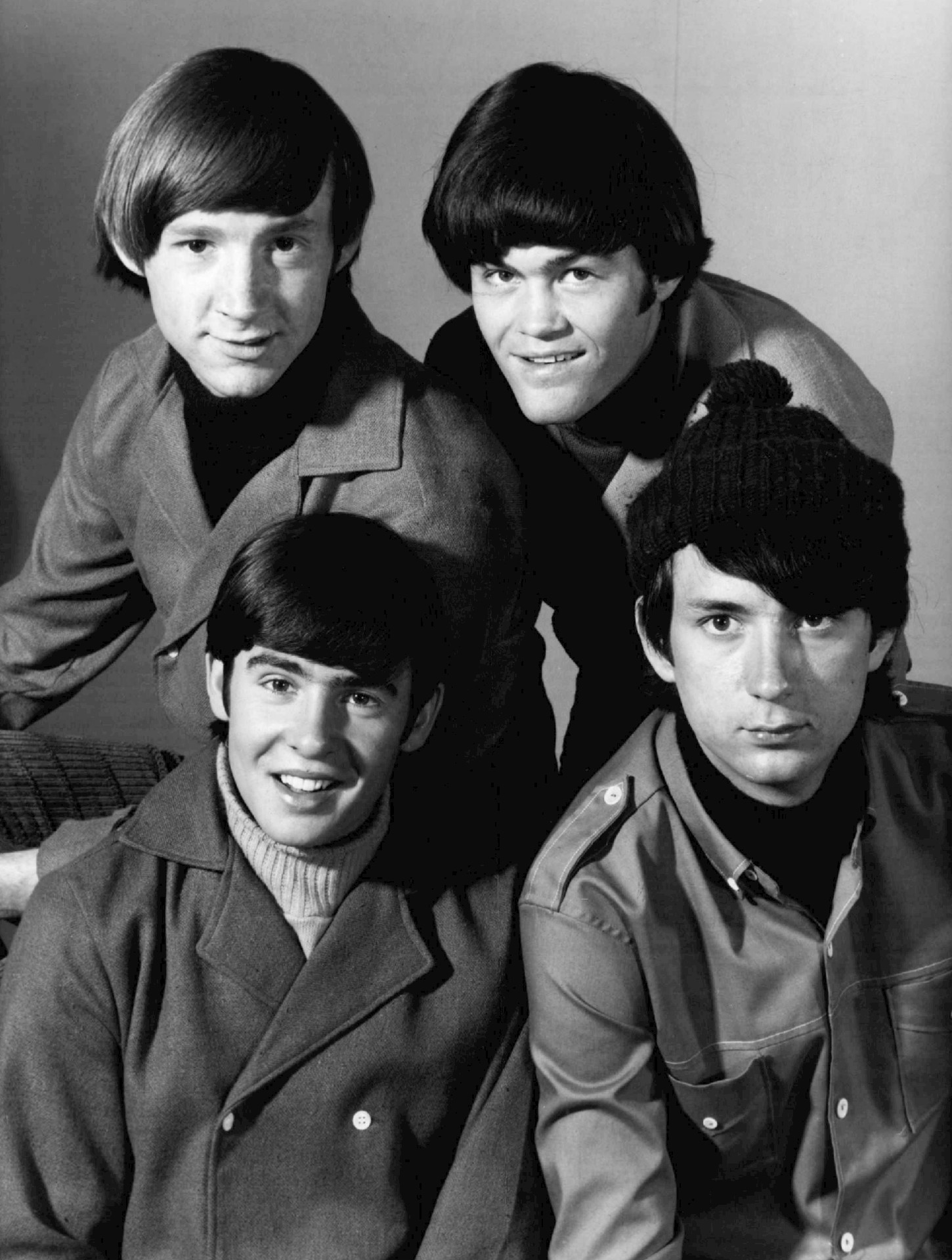
The Monkees had four number one albums in 1967, The Monkees, More of the Monkees (the year's best-selling album), Headquarters, and Pisces, Aquarius, Capricorn & Jones Ltd., which spent a cumulative 28 weeks, or more than half of the year, at number one.

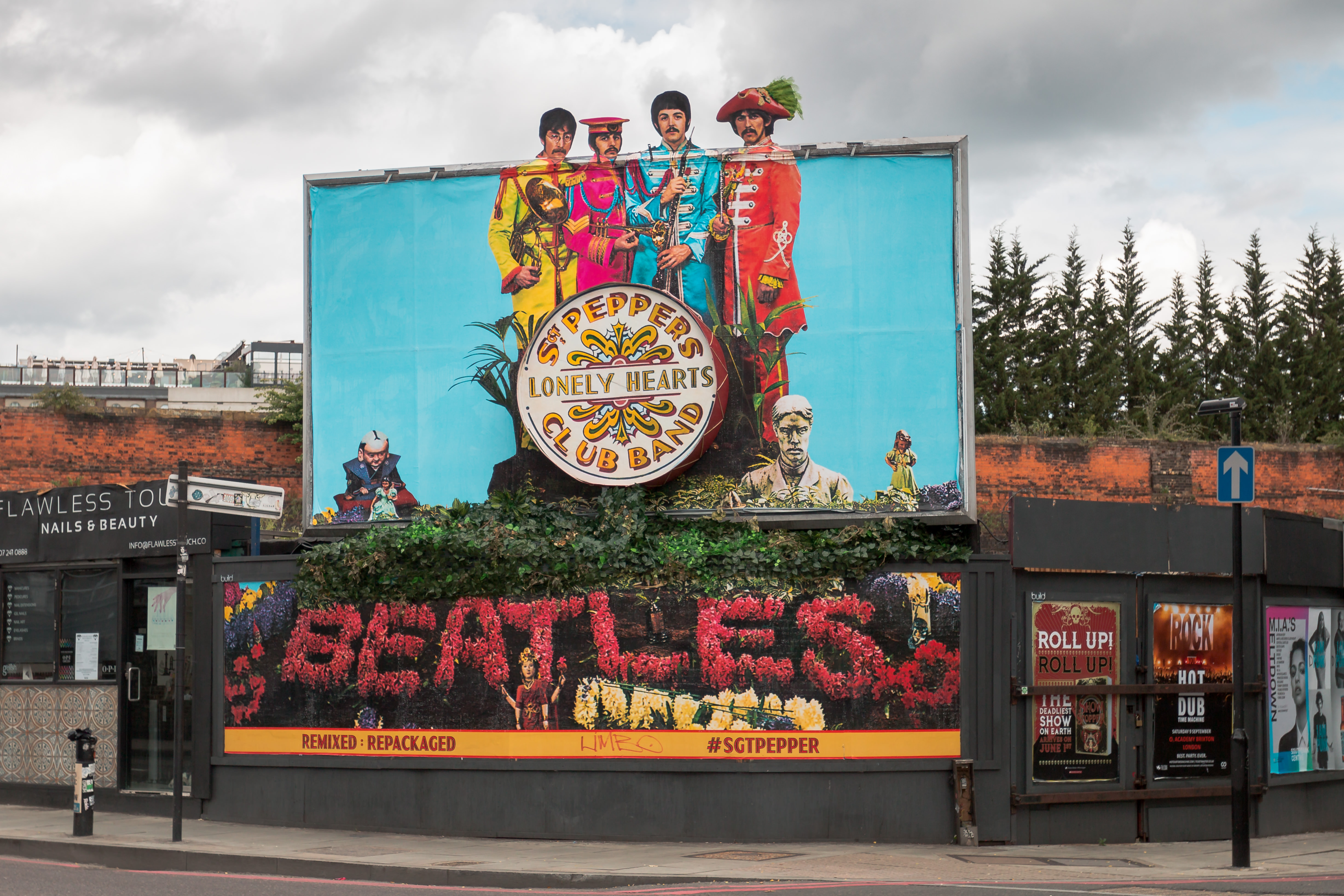
The Beatles' Sgt. Pepper's Lonely Hearts Club Band spent 15 weeks at number one.

== Chart history ==
Key
†	Indicates best performing album of 1967

Issue date	Album	Artist(s)	Label	Ref.
January 7	The Monkees	The Monkees	Colgems	
January 14	The Monkees	The Monkees	Colgems	
January 21	The Monkees	The Monkees	Colgems	
January 28	The Monkees	The Monkees	Colgems	
February 4	The Monkees	The Monkees	Colgems	
February 11	More of The Monkees †	The Monkees	Colgems	
February 18	More of The Monkees †	The Monkees	Colgems	
February 25	More of The Monkees †	The Monkees	Colgems	
March 4	More of The Monkees †	The Monkees	Colgems	
March 11	More of The Monkees †	The Monkees	Colgems	
March 18	More of The Monkees †	The Monkees	Colgems	
March 25	More of The Monkees †	The Monkees	Colgems	
April 1	More of The Monkees †	The Monkees	Colgems	
April 8	More of The Monkees †	The Monkees	Colgems	
April 15	More of The Monkees †	The Monkees	Colgems	
April 22	More of The Monkees †	The Monkees	Colgems	
April 29	More of The Monkees †	The Monkees	Colgems	
May 6	More of The Monkees †	The Monkees	Colgems	
May 13	More of The Monkees †	The Monkees	Colgems	
May 20	More of The Monkees †	The Monkees	Colgems	
May 27	More of The Monkees †	The Monkees	Colgems	
June 3	More of The Monkees †	The Monkees	Colgems	
June 10	More of The Monkees †	The Monkees	Colgems	
June 17	Sounds Like...	Herb Alpert and the Tijuana Brass	A&M	
June 24	Headquarters	The Monkees	Colgems	
July 1	Sgt. Pepper's Lonely Hearts Club Band	The Beatles	Capitol	
July 8	Sgt. Pepper's Lonely Hearts Club Band	The Beatles	Capitol	
July 15	Sgt. Pepper's Lonely Hearts Club Band	The Beatles	Capitol	
July 22	Sgt. Pepper's Lonely Hearts Club Band	The Beatles	Capitol	
July 29	Sgt. Pepper's Lonely Hearts Club Band	The Beatles	Capitol	
August 5	Sgt. Pepper's Lonely Hearts Club Band	The Beatles	Capitol	
August 12	Sgt. Pepper's Lonely Hearts Club Band	The Beatles	Capitol	
August 19	Sgt. Pepper's Lonely Hearts Club Band	The Beatles	Capitol	
August 26	Sgt. Pepper's Lonely Hearts Club Band	The Beatles	Capitol	
September 2	Sgt. Pepper's Lonely Hearts Club Band	The Beatles	Capitol	
September 9	Sgt. Pepper's Lonely Hearts Club Band	The Beatles	Capitol	
September 16	Sgt. Pepper's Lonely Hearts Club Band	The Beatles	Capitol	
September 23	Sgt. Pepper's Lonely Hearts Club Band	The Beatles	Capitol	
September 30	Sgt. Pepper's Lonely Hearts Club Band	The Beatles	Capitol	
October 7	Sgt. Pepper's Lonely Hearts Club Band	The Beatles	Capitol	
October 14	Ode to Billie Joe	Bobbie Gentry	Capitol	
October 21	Ode to Billie Joe	Bobbie Gentry	Capitol	
October 28	Diana Ross & the Supremes: Greatest Hits	The Supremes	Motown	
November 4	Diana Ross & the Supremes: Greatest Hits	The Supremes	Motown	
November 11	Diana Ross & the Supremes: Greatest Hits	The Supremes	Motown	
November 18	Diana Ross & the Supremes: Greatest Hits	The Supremes	Motown	
November 25	Diana Ross & the Supremes: Greatest Hits	The Supremes	Motown	
December 2	Pisces, Aquarius, Capricorn & Jones Ltd.	The Monkees	Colgems	
December 9	Pisces, Aquarius, Capricorn & Jones Ltd.	The Monkees	Colgems	
December 16	Pisces, Aquarius, Capricorn & Jones Ltd.	The Monkees	Colgems	
December 23	Pisces, Aquarius, Capricorn & Jones Ltd.	The Monkees	Colgems	
December 30	Pisces, Aquarius, Capricorn & Jones Ltd.	The Monkees	Colgems	

== See also ==
- 1967 in music
