= Led Zeppelin II =

Studio album by Led Zeppelin
- Released: 22 October 1969
- Recorded: April–August 1969
- Genres: Hard rock; blues rock; heavy metal
- Length: 40:44 (Note: Original LP pressings of the album lists the running time of "Thank You" at 3:50, since the song's coda has a false fade at that point. The 2014 deluxe reissue lists it as 4:49.)
- Label: Atlantic
- Producer: Jimmy Page

Led Zeppelin chronology
| Led Zeppelin (1969) | Led Zeppelin II (1969) | Led Zeppelin III (1970) |

Singles from Led Zeppelin II
- 1. "Whole Lotta Love" / "Living Loving Maid (She's Just a Woman)" Released: 7 November 1969 (US)

Led Zeppelin II is the second studio album by the English rock band Led Zeppelin, released on 22 October 1969 in the United States and on 31 October 1969 in the United Kingdom by Atlantic Records. Recording sessions for the album took place at several locations in both the United Kingdom and North America from January to August 1969. The album's production was credited to the band's lead guitarist and songwriter Jimmy Page, and it was also Led Zeppelin's first album on which Eddie Kramer served as engineer.

The album exhibited the band's evolving musical style of blues-derived material and their guitar riff-based sound. It has been described as the band's heaviest album. Six of the nine songs were written by the band, while the other three were reinterpretations of Chicago blues songs by Willie Dixon and Howlin' Wolf. One single, "Whole Lotta Love", was released outside of the UK (the band would release no UK singles during their career), and peaked as a top-ten single in over a dozen markets around the world.

Led Zeppelin II was a commercial success, and was the band's first album to reach number one on charts in the UK and the US. The album's cover designer David Juniper was nominated for a Grammy Award for Best Recording Package in 1970. On 15 November 1999, the album was certified 12× Platinum by the Recording Industry Association of America (RIAA) for sales reaching 12 million copies in the US. Since its release, various writers and music critics have cited Led Zeppelin II as one of the greatest and most influential albums of all time.

== Background ==
Led Zeppelin II was conceived during a busy period of Led Zeppelin's career from January through August 1969, when they completed four European and three American concert tours. Each song was separately recorded, mixed and produced at various studios in the UK and North America. The album was written on tour, during periods of a couple of hours in between concerts, a studio was booked and the recording process begun, necessarily resulting in spontaneity and urgency, which is reflected in the sound. Several songs resulted from improvisation while touring and were recorded mostly live in the studio.

Recording sessions for the album took place at a wide variety of studios in the UK and US, including Olympic and Morgan Studios in London, England; A&M, Quantum, Sunset, Mirror Sound and Mystic Studios in Los Angeles; Ardent Studios in Memphis, Tennessee; A&R, Juggy Sound, Groove and Mayfair Studios in New York City; and R&D Studios. Some of these were ill-equipped, leading to one Vancouver studio, which had an 8-track set-up without even proper headphone facilities, being credited as "a hut". A more favourable set-up was Mystic Studios in Hollywood, Los Angeles with Chris Huston engineering.

Lead singer Robert Plant later complained that the writing, recording, and mixing sessions were done in many different locations, and criticised the writing and recording process. "Thank You", "The Lemon Song" and "Moby Dick" were overdubbed during the tour, while the mixing of "Whole Lotta Love" and "Heartbreaker" was also done on tour. Page later stated, "In other words, some of the material came out of rehearsing for the next tour and getting new material together."

Page and Kramer spent two days mixing the album at A&R Studios, and the album's production was entirely credited to Jimmy Page, with Eddie Kramer engineering. Kramer was quoted as saying, "The famous Whole Lotta Love mix, where everything is going bananas, is a combination of Jimmy and myself just flying around on a small console twiddling every knob known to man." Kramer later gave great credit to Page for the sound that was achieved, despite the inconsistent conditions in which it was recorded: "We cut some of the tracks in some of the most bizarre studios you can imagine ... but in the end it sounded bloody marvellous ... there was one guy in charge and that was Mr. Page."

== Music and lyrics ==
The finished tracks reflect the evolving sound of the band and their live performances. Plant had his first songwriting credits on Led Zeppelin II; he had been unable to have his contributions to the writing process credited for the first album because of a prior contract with CBS Records.

=== Side one ===
"Whole Lotta Love" was built around a five-note Page riff. Parts of the lyrics were taken directly from Willie Dixon's "You Need Love", which led to the group being sued for plagiarism, eventually settling out of court. The arrangement also resembles the Small Faces track "You Need Loving". With basic tracks recorded on Page's houseboat, the middle section of the song contained a variety of overdubbed instruments and vocals which were mixed live by Page and Kramer, making full use of stereo panning and other controls available on the desk. The song was edited down to a single in the US, where it became a top 5 hit. In the UK, a single release was cancelled; the group never issued any singles there during their active career together. It was finally issued as a single in 1997. A mainly instrumental version of the song was recorded by CCS and was used as the theme tune to the BBC TV show Top of the Pops, ensuring it was well known by virtually everyone in Britain.

Led Zeppelin performed "Whole Lotta Love" at every gig from June 1969 onwards. It was the closing number of their live shows between 1970 and 1973, often extended to incorporate a rock'n'roll medley towards the end of the set. A different arrangement of the song was played for the Knebworth Fayre concerts in 1979. It was the last song the group ever performed live with drummer John Bonham, on 7 July 1980. "Whole Lotta Love" has since been critically praised as one of the definitive heavy metal tracks, though the group have never considered themselves to fit that specific style.

"What Is and What Should Never Be" was primarily written by Plant. It features a variety of dynamics during the track, along with flanged vocals and wide-panned stereo guitars.

"The Lemon Song" was a re-arrangement of Howlin' Wolf's "Killing Floor", which had become a regular part of the group's live show during 1969. It was mostly recorded live and expanded to include new lyrics, including the sexually charged phrase "squeeze my lemon" which was borrowed from Robert Johnson's "Travelling Riverside Blues", which the band had played for the BBC radio show Top Gear broadcast on 29 June 1969.

"Thank You" was written by Plant as a love song to his wife, Maureen. Page played twelve-string guitar and Jones played Hammond organ on the track.

=== Side two ===
"Heartbreaker" was mostly written by Page as a showcase for his guitar skills, including an unaccompanied solo in the middle of the song. It quickly became a live favourite, being performed regularly from October 1969 onwards, and throughout the group's career.

"Living Loving Maid (She's Just a Woman)" was purported to be written about a groupie the band encountered while touring the US. The group disliked the track, considering it to be little more than filler, and consequently it was never played live by the group. Plant performed the track live on his 1990 solo tour.

"Ramble On" was written by Plant. The lyrics were inspired by J. R. R. Tolkien, and similar themes appeared on subsequent Led Zeppelin albums. The track made good use of dynamics, moving from a quiet acoustic guitar in the opening, to a variety of overdubbed electric guitars towards the end. It was never performed live by Led Zeppelin during their main career, but Plant has performed the song regularly on solo tours, and it was part of Page and Plant's live set in the mid-1990s. It was finally performed live for the first time by Led Zeppelin at the Ahmet Ertegun Tribute Concert in 2007.

"Moby Dick" was designed as a showcase for Bonham's drum solo. A previous drum showpiece featured a different arrangement called "Pat's Delight" (after his wife). Moby Dick is in drop D tuning and features a variety of drums and percussive instruments played with bare hands as well as drumsticks. It was a regular part of Led Zeppelin's live show, developing to include additional percussion and electronic drums.

"Bring It On Home" was a cover of a Willie Dixon song originally performed by Sonny Boy Williamson II. Led Zeppelin's arrangement includes a faster middle section in addition to the straightforward blues structure of the original. It was played live regularly throughout late 1969 and 1970.

== Artwork ==
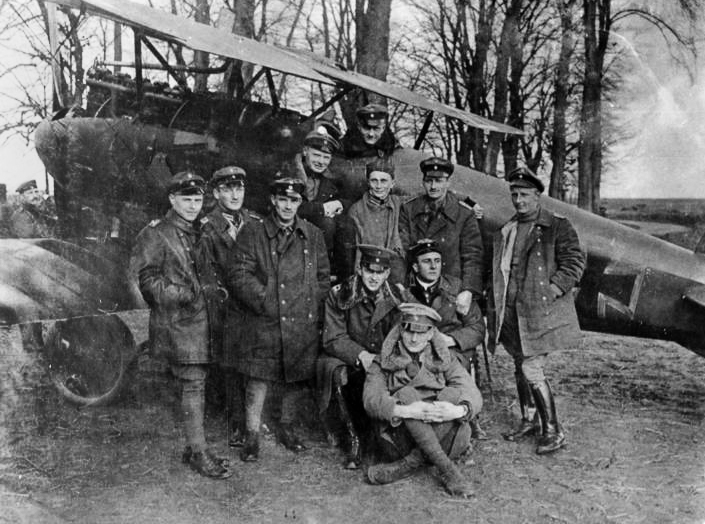
The World War I photograph on which the album sleeve was based

The album sleeve design was from a poster by David Juniper, who was simply told by the band to come up with an interesting idea. Juniper was a fellow student with Page at Sutton Art College in Surrey.

Juniper's design was based on a photograph of the Jagdstaffel 11 Division of the German Air Force during World War I, the Flying Circus led by the Red Baron. Juniper replaced four of the flyers' heads with photos of the band members, added facial hair and sunglasses to some of the flyers' faces or replaced some with the faces of other people. The blonde-haired woman is French actress Delphine Seyrig in her role as Marie-Madeleine in the film Mr. Freedom, a leftist anti-war satire by William Klein. The cover also pictured the outline of a Zeppelin on a brown background (similar to the cover of the band's first album), which gave the album its nickname "Brown Bomber".

== Release and reception ==
The album was released on 22 October 1969 on Atlantic Records, with advance orders of 400,000 copies. The advertising campaign was built around the slogans 'Led Zeppelin – The Only Way to Fly' and 'Led Zeppelin II Now Flying'. In the United States, some commercially duplicated reel-to-reel copies of Led Zeppelin II made by Ampex bore the title Led Zeppelin II – The Only Way to Fly on their spine. Commercially, Led Zeppelin II was the band's first album to hit No. 1 in the US, knocking The Beatles' Abbey Road (1969) twice from the top spot, where it remained for seven weeks. By April 1970 it had registered three million American sales, whilst in Britain it enjoyed a 138-week residence on the LP chart, climbing to the top spot in February 1970. Meanwhile, the album reached the top spot in 5 other national albums charts (including the Canadian, Australian and Spanish albums charts). In November Ritchie Yorke reported in Billboard that while the album had achieved "staggering" sales, as a hard rock record it was considered unsuitable for North American Top 40 radio stations, who were "dreary and detached from the mainstream of contemporary rock music".

The album also yielded Led Zeppelin's biggest hit, "Whole Lotta Love". This song reached No. 4 on the Billboard Hot 100 in January 1970, after Atlantic went against the group's wishes by releasing a shorter version on 45. The single's B-side, "Living Loving Maid (She's Just a Woman)", also hit the Billboard chart, peaking at No. 65 in April 1970. The album helped establish Led Zeppelin as an international concert attraction, and for the next year, the group continued to tour relentlessly, initially performing in clubs and ballrooms, then in larger auditoriums and eventually stadiums as their popularity grew.

Led Zeppelin II was not well-received by contemporary music critics. John Mendelsohn wrote a negative review of the record for Rolling Stone, in which he mocked the group's heavy sound and white blues, while writing that "until you've listened to the album eight hundred times, as I have, it seems as if it's just one especially heavy song extended over the space of two whole sides". In The Village Voice, Robert Christgau jokingly referred to the band as "the best of the wah-wah mannerist groups, so dirty they drool on demand", while complaining that "all the songs sound alike", before assigning the album a "B" grade. He nonetheless conceded in 1970 that "Led Zeppelin simply out-heavied everyone" the previous year, "pitting Jimmy Page's repeated low-register fuzz riffs against the untiring freak intensity of Robert Plant's vocal. This trademark has only emerged clearly on the second album, and more and more I am coming to understand it as an artistic triumph."

On 10 November 1969, the album was certified gold by the Recording Industry Association of America and in 1990 it was certified 5× platinum reflecting shipping of five million copies. By 14 November 1999, Led Zeppelin II had shipped twelve million copies and was certified 12× platinum by the RIAA. The 2014 reissue of the album helped itself get back into the Billboard Top 10 when it got to No. 9.

== Legacy and reappraisal ==
Retrospective professional ratings
Review scores
| Source | Rating |
|---|---|
| AllMusic | 5/5 stars |
| Blender | 4/5 stars |
| Encyclopedia of Popular Music | 5/5 stars |
| Entertainment Weekly | A+ |
| MusicHound Rock | 4.5/5 |
| Q | 4/5 stars |
| The Rolling Stone Album Guide | 5/5 stars |
| Tom Hull – on the Web | B+ |

Led Zeppelin II has since been regarded as the quintessential hard rock and heavy metal album. AllMusic editor Stephen Thomas Erlewine said it "provided the blueprint for all the heavy metal bands that followed it". While crediting the band for essentially inventing metal, Tom Hull said that, after the first album had declared their musical ambition, "the second honed it down to a singular entity, a sound", with subsequent albums expanding on it in "sophisticated, subtler, often quite intelligent" ways, but still indebted to "the basic dumbness" of II – "dumb not in the sense of stupid but of non-speaking. Lyrics are there of course, but as an integral part of the music, a music better appropriated tactilely, through incoherent sensation, than intellectually, literarily."

The album was described as a "brilliant if heavy-handed blues-rock offensive", by popular music scholar Ronald Zalkind. According to Robert Santelli's The Big Book of Blues: A Biographical Encyclopedia (2001), Led Zeppelin "had already begun to move beyond its blues-rock influences, venturing into previously unexplored hard-rock territories". Blues-derived songs like "Whole Lotta Love", "Heartbreaker", "The Lemon Song", "Moby Dick", and "Bring It On Home" have been seen as representing standards of the metal genre, where the guitar-based riff (rather than vocal chorus or verses) defines the song and provides the key hook. Such arrangements and emphasis were at the time atypical in popular music. Page's guitar solo in "Heartbreaker" was an influence on later renowned guitarists Eddie Van Halen, as inspiration for his two-handed tapping technique, and Steve Vai.

Since its initial critical reception, Led Zeppelin II has earned several accolades from music publications, being ranked on critics' "best album" lists. In 1989, Spin magazine ranked the album No. 5 on its list of The 25 Greatest Albums of All Time. In 1990, CD Review ranked it sixth on their list of top 50 CDs for starting a "pop/rock" library; an accompanying blurb described the album as "white boy blues with a hard rock edge". In 2000, Q magazine placed Led Zeppelin II at number 37 in its list of the 100 Greatest British Albums Ever. In 2003, the album was ranked number 75 on Rolling Stone magazine's list of the 500 greatest albums of all time, 79 in a 2012 revised list, and 123 in a 2020 revised list. The album was also included in the book 1001 Albums You Must Hear Before You Die.

The recording and release of Led Zeppelin II was extensively featured in the 2025 musical documentary Becoming Led Zeppelin, directed by Bernard MacMahon and produced by Allison McGourty, which chronicled Led Zeppelin's formation and first year.

Accolades for Led Zeppelin II
| Publication | Country | Accolade | Year | Rank |
|---|---|---|---|---|
| Grammy Award | United States | "Grammy Award for Best Recording Package" | 1970 | Nominee |
| Guitarist | United Kingdom | "Top 50 Most Influential Guitar Albums of All Time Ever" | 1994 | 3 |
| Mojo | United Kingdom | "The 100 Greatest Albums Ever Made" | 1996 | 41 |
| Platendraaier | The Netherlands – Dutch | "Top 30 Albums of the 60s" | 2015 | 11 |
| The Guitar | United States | "Album of the Millennium" | 1999 | 6 |
| Rolling Stone | United States | "The 500 Greatest Albums of All Time" | 2020 | 123 |
| Q | United Kingdom | "100 Greatest Albums Ever" | 2003 | 37 |
| Rock Hard | Germany | "The 500 Greatest Rock & Metal Albums of All Time" | 2005 | 318 |
| Robert Dimery | United States | "1001 Albums You Must Hear Before You Die" | 2006 | * |
| Classic Rock | United Kingdom | "100 Greatest British Rock Album Ever" | 2006 | 8 |
| Rock and Roll Hall of Fame | United States | "The Definitive 200: Top 200 Albums of All-Time" | 2007 | 47 |
| Q | United Kingdom | "50 Years of Great British Music (1960s)" | 2008 | * |

(*) designates unordered lists.

== 2014 reissue ==
2014 reissue ratings
Aggregate scores
| Source | Rating |
|---|---|
| Metacritic | 95/100 |
Review scores
| Source | Rating |
| The Austin Chronicle | 3/5 stars |
| Consequence of Sound | A− |
| Pitchfork | 10/10 |
| Q | 5/5 stars |
| Rolling Stone | 4.5/5 stars |

Along with the group's self-titled debut album and their third album, Led Zeppelin III, the album was remastered and reissued on 2 June 2014. The reissue comes in six formats: a standard CD edition, a deluxe two-CD edition, a standard LP version, a deluxe two-LP version, a super deluxe two-CD plus two-LP version with a hardback book, and as high-resolution, 24-bit/96k digital downloads. The deluxe and super deluxe editions feature bonus material containing alternative takes, backing tracks and the previously unreleased instrumental, "La La". The reissue was released with an altered colour version of the original album's artwork as its bonus disc's cover.

The reissue was met with widespread critical acclaim. At Metacritic, which assigns a normalised rating out of 100 to reviews from mainstream publications, the album received an average score of 95, based on 10 reviews. Pitchfork journalist Mark Richardson said, "the reissue sounds as thrilling as ever", while Julian Marszalek of The Quietus noted the bonus disc's "intriguing insight" into the original record's creation. In Rolling Stone, David Fricke wrote, "the alternate takes highlight Robert Plant's ripening vocal poise and, in a rough mix of 'Ramble On', the decisive, melodic force of John Paul Jones' bass and John Bonham's drumming." "As a two-disc set", Consequence of Sound's Michael Madden wrote, "this reissue is both a reminder of the original album's wallop and a closer look at the alchemy of a band increasingly attuned to ideas of progression." Raoul Hernandez from The Austin Chronicle was more critical of the bonus disc, finding it to be "the thinnest of extras" offered by the reissue program.

== Track listing ==
All tracks written by Jimmy Page and Robert Plant, except where noted.

=== Original release ===
Side one
| No. | Title | Writer(s) | Length |
|---|---|---|---|
| 1. | "Whole Lotta Love" | Jimmy Page; Robert Plant; John Paul Jones; John Bonham; Willie Dixon | 5:33 |
| 2. | "What Is and What Should Never Be" | | 4:47 |
| 3. | "The Lemon Song" ( (Note: Track 3 titled "Killing Floor" on earlier UK LPs.)) | Page; Plant; Jones; Bonham; Chester Burnett | 6:20 |
| 4. | "Thank You" | | 3:50 |
| Total length: | | | 20:30 |

Side two
| No. | Title | Writer(s) | Length |
|---|---|---|---|
| 1. | "Heartbreaker" | Page; Plant; Jones; Bonham | 4:15 |
| 2. | "Living Loving Maid (She's Just a Woman)" ( (Note: Track 2 titled "Livin' Lovin' Wreck (She's a Woman)" on earlier UK LPs.)) | | 2:40 |
| 3. | "Ramble On" | | 4:35 |
| 4. | "Moby Dick" | Page; Jones; Bonham | 4:25 |
| 5. | "Bring It On Home" | Page; Plant; Jones; Bonham; Dixon; (Note: Originally credited to Page, Plant, Jones, Bonham. Newer releases credit the song solely to Dixon.) | 4:19 |
| Total length: | | | 20:14 40:44 |

=== Deluxe Edition (2014) ===
2014 deluxe edition bonus disc
| No. | Title | Writer(s) | Recording Date | Length |
|---|---|---|---|---|
| 1. | "Whole Lotta Love" (Rough mix with vocal) | Page; Plant; Jones; Bonham; Dixon | 16 April 1969 | 5:38 |
| 2. | "What Is and What Should Never Be" (Rough mix with vocal) | | 19 April 1969 | 4:33 |
| 3. | "Thank You" (Backing track) | | 25 June 1969 | 4:21 |
| 4. | "Heartbreaker" (Rough mix with vocal) | Page; Plant; Jones; Bonham | 21 May 1969 | 4:24 |
| 5. | "Living Loving Maid (She's Just a Woman)" (Backing track) | | 25 June 1969 | 3:08 |
| 6. | "Ramble On" (Rough mix with vocal) | | 1 June 1969 | 4:43 |
| 7. | "Moby Dick" (Backing track) | Page; Jones; Bonham | 6 May 1969 | 1:37 |
| 8. | "La La" (Intro/Outro Rough mix) | | 14 April 1969 | 4:07 |
| Total length: | | | | 32:39 |

== Personnel ==
Led Zeppelin

- Robert Plant – vocals, harmonica , tambourine
- Jimmy Page – guitars, theremin, backing vocals
- John Paul Jones – bass guitar, organ, backing vocals
- John Bonham – drums, percussion

Production

- Producer – Jimmy Page
- Recording engineers

George Chkiantz at Olympic Studios, London: "Whole Lotta Love", "What Is and What Should Never Be"
Chris Huston at Mystic Studios, Los Angeles: "The Lemon Song", "Moby Dick"
Andy Johns at Morgan Studios, London: "Thank You", "Living Loving Maid (She's Just a Woman)"
Eddie Kramer at A & R Studios, Juggy Sound Studio, and Atlantic Studios (resp.), New York: "Heartbreaker", "Ramble On", "Bring It On Home"

- Director of engineering and mixing at A & R Studios – Eddie Kramer
- LP mastering – Robert Ludwig
- Executive producer – Peter Grant
- Artwork – David Juniper

Digitally remastered editions

- First 1987 CD mastering [19127-2] – Barry Diament at Atlantic Studios
- 1994 digital remastering (from the original master tapes) – Jimmy Page and George Marino at Sterling Sound
- 2014 24 bit/192 kHz digital transfers of the original analogue tapes – Jimmy Page at Metropolis Mastering, London

Additional engineering for prev. unreleased studio outtakes – Drew Griffiths at Metropolis Mastering, London
Mastering of prev. unreleased tracks – John Davis at Metropolis Mastering, London

- All reissues produced by Jimmy Page

== Charts ==
=== Weekly charts ===
Original release

1969–1970 weekly chart performance for Led Zeppelin II
| Chart (1969–1970) | Peak position |
|---|---|
| Australian Albums (Kent Music Report) | 1 |
| Canada Top Albums/CDs (RPM) | 1 |
| Danish Albums Chart | 10 |
| Dutch Albums (Album Top 100) | 1 |
| Finnish Albums (The Official Finnish Charts) | 1 |
| German Albums (Offizielle Top 100) | 1 |
| Italian Albums (Musica e Dischi) | 2 |
| Japanese Albums (Oricon) | 8 |
| Norwegian Albums (VG-lista) | 2 |
| Spanish Albums Chart | 1 |
| UK Albums (Official Charts) | 1 |
| US Billboard 200 | 1 |

2014 reissue

2014 weekly chart performance for Led Zeppelin II
| Chart (2014) | Peak position |
|---|---|
| Australian Albums (ARIA) | 24 |
| Austrian Albums (Ö3 Austria) | 25 |
| Belgian Albums (Ultratop Flanders) | 19 |
| Belgian Albums (Ultratop Wallonia) | 13 |
| Danish Albums (Hitlisten) | 10 |
| Finnish Albums (Suomen virallinen lista) | 6 |
| French Albums (SNEP) | 15 |
| Hungarian Albums (MAHASZ) | 4 |
| Italian Albums (FIMI) | 15 |
| New Zealand Albums (RMNZ) | 6 |
| Polish Albums (ZPAV) | 9 |
| Portuguese Albums (AFP) | 15 |
| Spanish Albums (Promusicae) | 24 |
| Swedish Albums (Sverigetopplistan) | 13 |
| Swiss Albums (Schweizer Hitparade) | 15 |

=== Year-end charts ===
Year-end chart performance for Led Zeppelin II
| Chart (2002) | Position |
|---|---|
| Canadian Metal Albums (Nielsen SoundScan) | 96 |

== Certifications ==
Certifications for Led Zeppelin II
| Region | Certification | Certified units/sales |
|---|---|---|
| Argentina (CAPIF) | Gold | 30,000^{^} |
| Australia (ARIA) | 4× Platinum | 280,000^{^} |
| Austria (IFPI Austria) | Gold | 25,000^{*} |
| Canada (Music Canada) | 9× Platinum | 900,000^{^} |
| France (SNEP) | 2× Gold | 200,000^{*} |
| Germany (BVMI) | Platinum | 500,000^{^} |
| Italy (FIMI) sales since 2009 | Platinum | 100,000^{*} |
| Spain (Promusicae) | Gold | 50,000^{^} |
| Sweden (GLF) | Gold | 25,000 |
| United Kingdom (BPI) | 4× Platinum | 1,200,000^{^} |
| United States (RIAA) | 12× Platinum | 12,000,000^{^} |
^{*} Sales figures based on certification alone.^{^} Shipments figures based on certification alone.

== See also ==
- List of best-selling albums in the United States
- List of Billboard 200 number-one albums of 1970
- Train Does Led Zeppelin II
