= The Sound of Music (original Broadway cast recording) =

The Sound of Music: Original Broadway Cast

Cast recording by the original Broadway cast
- Released: 1959
- Recorded: 1959
- Genre: Show tunes
- Label: Columbia Masterworks

Professional ratings
Review scores
Source	Rating
Billboard	positive
AllMusic	5/5 stars
AllMusic	no rating (1987 CD)

The Sound of Music, subtitled Original Broadway Cast, is an album containing a recording of the 1959 Broadway musical The Sound of Music made by its original cast. The album was released in the same year by Columbia.

Billboard reviewed the album in its issue from December 7, 1959, writing: "Mary Martin is charming and sparkling, and she is warmly assisted by the other principals. The show boasts a flock of lovely and lyrical tunes. Flattering reviews the show has received will aid in interest for the album" and classifying it as "top potential".

The album finished 1960 as the best-selling album of the year in the United States according to Billboard, 1961 as the fourth-best-selling, and 1962 as the fifth-best-selling.

== Track listing ==
LP (Columbia Masterworks KOL 5450)

Side 1
No.	Title	Length
1.	"1.1. Preludium" "1.2. The Sound of Music"
2.	"Maria"
3.	"My Favorite Things"
4.	"Do-Re-Mi"
5.	"Sixteen Going on Seventeen"
6.	"The Lonely Goatherd"
7.	"How Can Love Survive"

Side 2
No.	Title	Length
1.	"The Sound of Music" (Reprise)
2.	"Laendler"
3.	"So Long, Farewell"
4.	"Climb Ev'ry Mountain"
5.	"No Way to Stop It"
6.	"An Ordinary Couple"
7.	"Processional"
8.	"Sixteen Going on Seventeen"
9.	"Edelweiss"
10.	"Climb Ev'ry Mountain"

== Charts ==
=== Weekly charts ===
Chart (1960)	Peak position
US Billboard Top LPs – Mono Action Albums	1
US Billboard Top LPs – Stereo Action Albums	1

=== Year-end charts ===
Chart (1960)	Position
US Billboard 200	1
Chart (1961)	Position
US Billboard 200	4
Chart (1962)	Position
US Billboard 200	5

== Certifications ==
Region	Certification	Certified units/sales
United States (RIAA)	Gold	500,000^{^}
^{^} Shipments figures based on certification alone.

== Awards ==
Year	Award type	Categories	Results	Ref.
1961	Grammy Awards	Best Show Album (Original Cast)	Won	
