= List of Billboard number-one albums of 1954 =

These are number-one albums of 1954, per Billboard magazine's albums chart.

== Chart history ==
Chart history
Issue date	Album	Artist(s)	Label	Ref.
January 2	No album chart			
January 9	No album chart			
January 16	No album chart			
January 23	Music for Lovers Only	Jackie Gleason	Capitol	
January 30	Music for Lovers Only	Jackie Gleason	Capitol	
February 6	Music for Lovers Only	Jackie Gleason	Capitol	
February 13	Music for Lovers Only	Jackie Gleason	Capitol	
February 20	Music for Lovers Only	Jackie Gleason	Capitol	
February 27	Music for Lovers Only	Jackie Gleason	Capitol	
March 6	Tawny	Jackie Gleason	Capitol	
March 13	The Glenn Miller Story	Soundtrack	Decca	
March 20	The Glenn Miller Story	Soundtrack	Decca	
March 27	The Glenn Miller Story	Soundtrack	Decca	
April 3	The Glenn Miller Story	Soundtrack	Decca	
April 10	The Glenn Miller Story	Soundtrack	Decca	
April 17	The Glenn Miller Story	Soundtrack	Decca	
April 24	The Glenn Miller Story	Soundtrack	Decca	
May 1	The Glenn Miller Story	Soundtrack	Decca	
May 8	The Glenn Miller Story	Soundtrack	Decca	
May 15	The Glenn Miller Story	Soundtrack	Decca	
May 22	Glenn Miller Plays Selections from "The Glenn Miller Story"	Glenn Miller	RCA Victor	
May 29	Glenn Miller Plays Selections from "The Glenn Miller Story"	Glenn Miller	RCA Victor	
June 5	Glenn Miller Plays Selections from "The Glenn Miller Story"	Glenn Miller	RCA Victor	
June 12	Music for Lovers Only	Jackie Gleason	Capitol	
June 19	Music for Lovers Only	Jackie Gleason	Capitol	
June 26	Glenn Miller Plays Selections from "The Glenn Miller Story"	Glenn Miller	RCA Victor	
July 3	Glenn Miller Plays Selections from "The Glenn Miller Story"	Glenn Miller	RCA Victor	
July 10	Glenn Miller Plays Selections from "The Glenn Miller Story"	Glenn Miller	RCA Victor	
July 17	Glenn Miller Plays Selections from "The Glenn Miller Story"	Glenn Miller	RCA Victor	
July 24	Glenn Miller Plays Selections from "The Glenn Miller Story"	Glenn Miller	RCA Victor	
July 31	Glenn Miller Plays Selections from "The Glenn Miller Story"	Glenn Miller	RCA Victor	
August 7	Glenn Miller Plays Selections from "The Glenn Miller Story"	Glenn Miller	RCA Victor	
August 14	Glenn Miller Plays Selections from "The Glenn Miller Story"	Glenn Miller	RCA Victor	
August 21	The Student Prince	Mario Lanza	RCA Victor	
August 28	The Student Prince	Mario Lanza	RCA Victor	
September 4	The Student Prince	Mario Lanza	RCA Victor	
September 11	The Student Prince	Mario Lanza	RCA Victor	
September 18	The Student Prince	Mario Lanza	RCA Victor	
September 25	The Student Prince	Mario Lanza	RCA Victor	
October 2	The Student Prince	Mario Lanza	RCA Victor	
October 9	The Student Prince	Mario Lanza	RCA Victor	
October 16	The Student Prince	Mario Lanza	RCA Victor	
October 23	The Student Prince	Mario Lanza	RCA Victor	
October 30	Music, Martinis and Memories	Jackie Gleason	Capitol	
November 6	Music, Martinis and Memories	Jackie Gleason	Capitol	
November 13	The Student Prince	Mario Lanza	RCA Victor	
November 20	The Student Prince	Mario Lanza	RCA Victor	
November 27	The Student Prince	Mario Lanza	RCA Victor	
December 4	The Student Prince	Mario Lanza	RCA Victor	
December 11	The Student Prince	Mario Lanza	RCA Victor	
December 18	The Student Prince	Mario Lanza	RCA Victor	
December 25	The Student Prince	Mario Lanza	RCA Victor	

== See also ==
- 1954 in music
