= Flower Drum Song (original Broadway cast recording) =

Cast recording by various artists
- Released: 1958
- Genre: Show tunes
- Label: Columbia Masterworks

An original Broadway cast recording of the 1958 musical Flower Drum Song was made in the same year for Columbia. Released on an LP credited to "Rodgers & Hammerstein in association with Joseph Fields" and "Rodgers & Hammerstein Records, Inc.", it reached No. 1 on the Billboard Best Selling LPs chart.

== Recording ==
A week after the musical opened at the St. James Theatre, the Broadway cast recorded it for Columbia in its 30th Street Studio. The cast included Miyoshi Umeki, Pat Suzuki, Keye Luke, and Arabella Hong. The musical direction was handled by Salvatore Dell'Isola, a long-standing Rodgers and Hammerstein collaborator.

== Release ==
The album was originally issued on LP (cat. no. OL 5350).

== Reception ==
Professional ratings
Review scores
Source	Rating
Billboard	(favorable)

Billboard reviewed the album in the issue dated December 15, 1958, writing: "The bright and attractive score is given first-rate performances by principals. [...] The set should prove a healthy item saleswise."

The album reached No. 1 on the Billboard's Best Selling LPs chart.

== Track listing ==
12-inch LP (Columbia Masterworks OL 5350)

No.	Title	Artist(s)	Length
1.	"Overture"	Orchestra	4:15
2.	"You Are Beautiful"	Ed Kenney, Juanita Hall	4:06
3.	"A Hundred Million Miracles"	Miyoshi Umeki, Conrad Yama, Keye Luke, Juanita Hall, Rose Quong	4:29
4.	"I Enjoy Being a Girl"	Pat Suzuki	3:40
5.	"I Am Going to Like It Here"	Miyoshi Umeki	3:54
6.	"Like a God"	Ed Kenney	1:37
7.	"Chop Suey"	Juanita Hall, Pat Adiarte, Ensemble	2:41
8.	"Don't Marry Me"	Larry Blyden, Miyoshi Umeki	4:10

No.	Title	Artist(s)	Length
1.	"Entr'acte"	Orchestra	1:36
2.	"Grant Avenue"	Pat Suzuki, Ensemble	2:36
3.	"Love, Look Away"	Arabella Hong	3:35
4.	"At the Celestial Bar" "Fan Tan Fanny" "Gliding Through My Memoree" "Grant Avenue" (Reprise)	Anita Ellis; Jack Soo; Pat Suzuki, Ensemble	5:07
5.	"The Other Generation"	Juanita Hall, Keye Luke	3:19
6.	"Sunday"	Pat Suzuki, Larry Blyden	4:25
7.	"The Other Generation" (Reprise)	Pat Adiarte, Susan Lynn, Baayork Lee, Linda and Yvonne Ribuca, Luis Robert Hernandez, Cely Carrillo	2:05
8.	"Wedding Parade and Finale"	Ensemble	2:28

== Charts ==
Chart (1959)	Peak position
US Billboard Best Selling LPs	1

== Awards ==
Year	Award type	Categories	Results	Ref.
1959	Grammy Awards	Best Original Cast Album (Broadway or TV)	Nominated	

== See also ==
- List of Billboard number-one albums of 1959
