= List of Canadian number-one albums of 1964 =

This list contains the albums ranking number one in Canada in 1964.

== Albums ==
Date	Title	Artist	Ref
January 6	The Singing Nun	Souer Sourire	
January 13	Beatlemania	The Beatles	
January 20	Beatlemania	The Beatles	
January 27	Beatlemania	The Beatles	
February 3	Beatlemania	The Beatles	
February 10	Beatlemania	The Beatles	
February 17	Beatlemania	The Beatles	
February 24	Twist & Shout	The Beatles	
March 2	Twist & Shout	The Beatles	
March 9	Twist & Shout	The Beatles	
March 16	Twist & Shout	The Beatles	
March 23	Twist & Shout	The Beatles	
March 30	Twist & Shout	The Beatles	
April 6	Twist & Shout	The Beatles	
April 13	Twist & Shout	The Beatles	
April 20	Twist & Shout	The Beatles	
April 27	Kissin' Cousins	Elvis Presley	
May 4	Kissin' Cousins	Elvis Presley	
May 11	Long Tall Sally	The Beatles	
May 18	Long Tall Sally	The Beatles	
May 25	Bits and Pieces	Dave Clark 5	
June 1	Long Tall Sally	The Beatles	
June 8	Long Tall Sally	The Beatles	
June 15	Long Tall Sally	The Beatles	
June 22	Hello Dolly	Louis Armstrong	
June 29	Hello Dolly	Louis Armstrong	
July 6	Hello Dolly	Louis Armstrong	
July 13	A Hard Day's Night	The Beatles	
July 20	A Hard Day's Night	The Beatles	
July 27	A Hard Day's Night	The Beatles	
August 3	A Hard Day's Night	The Beatles	
August 10	A Hard Day's Night	The Beatles	
August 17	A Hard Day's Night	The Beatles	
August 24	A Hard Day's Night	The Beatles	
August 31	A Hard Day's Night	The Beatles	
September 7	A Hard Day's Night	The Beatles	
September 14	A Hard Day's Night	The Beatles	
September 21	A Hard Day's Night	The Beatles	
September 28	A Hard Day's Night	The Beatles	
October 5	A Hard Day's Night	The Beatles	
October 12	A Hard Day's Night	The Beatles	
October 19	A Hard Day's Night	The Beatles	
October 26	Something New	The Beatles	
November 2	Something New	The Beatles	
November 9	Something New	The Beatles	
November 16	Something New	The Beatles	
November 23	Roustabout	Elvis Presley	
November 30	Roustabout	Elvis Presley	
December 7	Roustabout	Elvis Presley	
December 14	Roustabout	Elvis Presley	
December 21	Roustabout	Elvis Presley	
December 28	Beatles '65	The Beatles	
