= List of Billboard Top LPs number-one albums of 1963 =

These are the number-one albums in the United States per Billboard magazine during the year 1963. Prior to August 1963, separate charts existed for albums in mono and stereo formats. The chart is now known as the 'Billboard 200'.

Key
†	Indicates best performing album of 1963

== Chart history through August 10 ==
Chart history
Issue date	Mono			Stereo			Ref.
Issue date	Album	Artist(s)	Label	Album	Artist(s)	Label	Ref.
January 5	The First Family	Vaughn Meader	Cadence	West Side Story †	Soundtrack	Columbia	
January 12	The First Family	Vaughn Meader	Cadence	West Side Story †	Soundtrack	Columbia	
January 19	The First Family	Vaughn Meader	Cadence	West Side Story †	Soundtrack	Columbia	
January 26	The First Family	Vaughn Meader	Cadence	West Side Story †	Soundtrack	Columbia	
February 2	The First Family	Vaughn Meader	Cadence	West Side Story †	Soundtrack	Columbia	
February 9	The First Family	Vaughn Meader	Cadence	West Side Story †	Soundtrack	Columbia	
February 16	The First Family	Vaughn Meader	Cadence	West Side Story †	Soundtrack	Columbia	
February 23	The First Family	Vaughn Meader	Cadence	West Side Story †	Soundtrack	Columbia	
March 2	The First Family	Vaughn Meader	Cadence	West Side Story †	Soundtrack	Columbia	
March 9	My Son, the Celebrity	Allan Sherman	Warner Bros.	Jazz Samba	Stan Getz / Charlie Byrd	Verve	
March 16	Songs I Sing on The Jackie Gleason Show	Frank Fontaine	ABC/Paramount	West Side Story †	Soundtrack	Columbia	
March 23	Songs I Sing on The Jackie Gleason Show	Frank Fontaine	ABC/Paramount	West Side Story †	Soundtrack	Columbia	
March 30	Songs I Sing on The Jackie Gleason Show	Frank Fontaine	ABC/Paramount	West Side Story †	Soundtrack	Columbia	
April 6	Songs I Sing on The Jackie Gleason Show	Frank Fontaine	ABC/Paramount	West Side Story †	Soundtrack	Columbia	
April 13	Songs I Sing on The Jackie Gleason Show	Frank Fontaine	ABC/Paramount	West Side Story †	Soundtrack	Columbia	
April 20	West Side Story †	Soundtrack	Columbia	West Side Story †	Soundtrack	Columbia	
April 27	West Side Story †	Soundtrack	Columbia	West Side Story †	Soundtrack	Columbia	
May 4	Days of Wine and Roses and Other TV Requests	Andy Williams	Columbia	West Side Story †	Soundtrack	Columbia	
May 11	Days of Wine and Roses and Other TV Requests	Andy Williams	Columbia	West Side Story †	Soundtrack	Columbia	
May 18	Days of Wine and Roses and Other TV Requests	Andy Williams	Columbia	West Side Story †	Soundtrack	Columbia	
May 25	Days of Wine and Roses and Other TV Requests	Andy Williams	Columbia	West Side Story †	Soundtrack	Columbia	
June 1	Days of Wine and Roses and Other TV Requests	Andy Williams	Columbia	Days of Wine and Roses	Andy Williams	Columbia	
June 8	Days of Wine and Roses and Other TV Requests	Andy Williams	Columbia	Days of Wine and Roses	Andy Williams	Columbia	
June 15	Days of Wine and Roses and Other TV Requests	Andy Williams	Columbia	Days of Wine and Roses	Andy Williams	Columbia	
June 22	Days of Wine and Roses and Other TV Requests	Andy Williams	Columbia	Days of Wine and Roses	Andy Williams	Columbia	
June 29	Days of Wine and Roses and Other TV Requests	Andy Williams	Columbia	Days of Wine and Roses	Andy Williams	Columbia	
July 6	Days of Wine and Roses and Other TV Requests	Andy Williams	Columbia	Days of Wine and Roses	Andy Williams	Columbia	
July 13	Days of Wine and Roses and Other TV Requests	Andy Williams	Columbia	Days of Wine and Roses	Andy Williams	Columbia	
July 20	Days of Wine and Roses and Other TV Requests	Andy Williams	Columbia	Days of Wine and Roses	Andy Williams	Columbia	
July 27	Days of Wine and Roses and Other TV Requests	Andy Williams	Columbia	Days of Wine and Roses	Andy Williams	Columbia	
August 3	Days of Wine and Roses and Other TV Requests	Andy Williams	Columbia	Days of Wine and Roses	Andy Williams	Columbia	
August 10	Days of Wine and Roses and Other TV Requests	Andy Williams	Columbia	Days of Wine and Roses	Andy Williams	Columbia	

== Chart history August 17 to end of year ==
Issue date	Album	Artist(s)	Label	Ref.
August 17	Days of Wine and Roses	Andy Williams	Columbia	
August 24	Recorded Live: The 12 Year Old Genius	Little Stevie Wonder	Tamla	
August 31	My Son, the Nut	Allan Sherman	Warner Bros.	
September 7	My Son, the Nut	Allan Sherman	Warner Bros.	
September 14	My Son, the Nut	Allan Sherman	Warner Bros.	
September 21	My Son, the Nut	Allan Sherman	Warner Bros.	
September 28	My Son, the Nut	Allan Sherman	Warner Bros.	
October 5	My Son, the Nut	Allan Sherman	Warner Bros.	
October 12	My Son, the Nut	Allan Sherman	Warner Bros.	
October 19	My Son, the Nut	Allan Sherman	Warner Bros.	
October 26	Peter, Paul and Mary	Peter, Paul and Mary	Warner Bros.	
November 2	In the Wind	Peter, Paul and Mary	Warner Bros.	
November 9	In the Wind	Peter, Paul and Mary	Warner Bros.	
November 16	In the Wind	Peter, Paul and Mary	Warner Bros.	
November 23	In the Wind	Peter, Paul and Mary	Warner Bros.	
November 30	In the Wind	Peter, Paul and Mary	Warner Bros.	
December 7	The Singing Nun	Soeur Sourire, the Singing Nun	Philips	
December 14	The Singing Nun	Soeur Sourire, the Singing Nun	Philips	
December 21	The Singing Nun	Soeur Sourire, the Singing Nun	Philips	
December 28	The Singing Nun	Soeur Sourire, the Singing Nun	Philips	

== See also ==
- 1963 in music
- List of number-one albums (United States)
