= List of Billboard 200 number-one albums of 1964 =

These are the Billboard magazine number-one albums of 1964, per the Billboard 200.

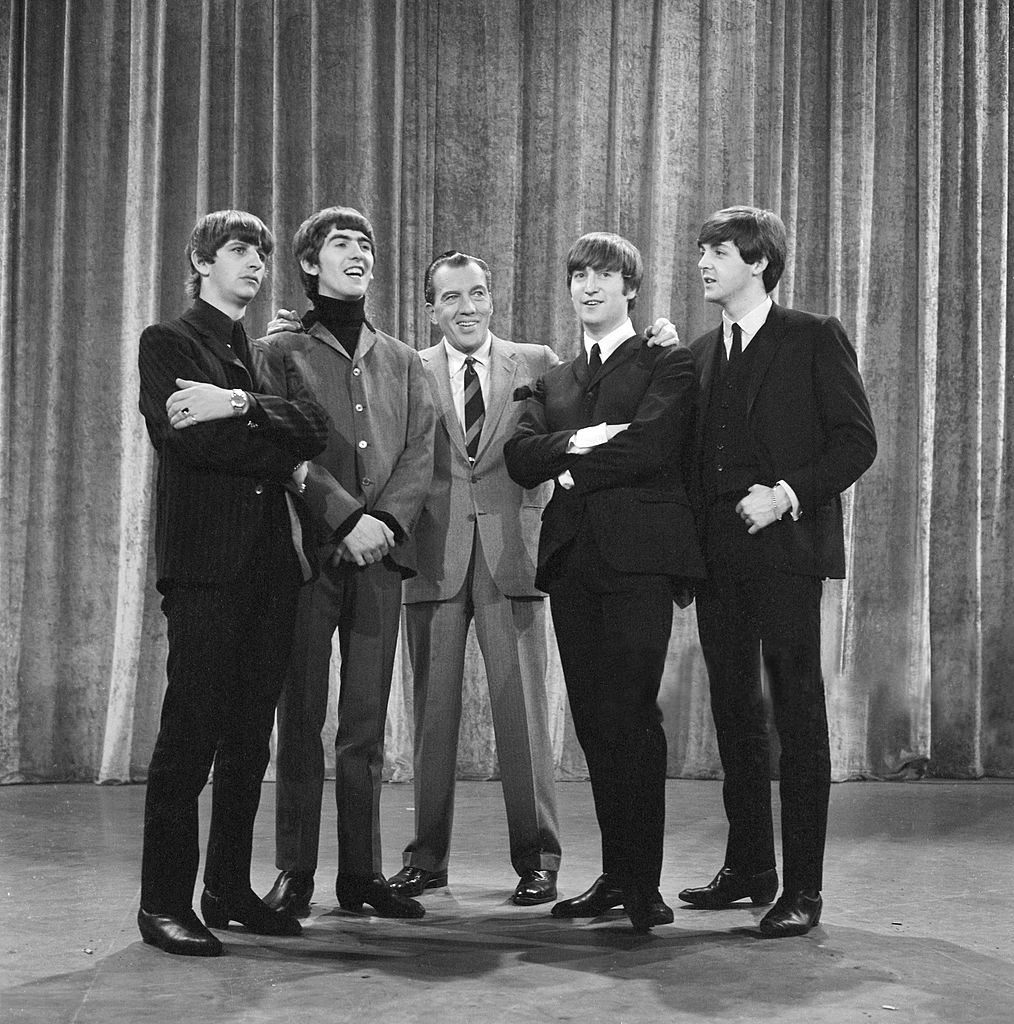
The Beatles had three number one albums in 1964, Meet the Beatles!, The Beatles' Second Album and A Hard Day's Night, which spent a cumulative 30 weeks, or more than half the year, at number one.

== Chart history ==
Key
| † | Indicates best performing album of 1964 |

| Issue date | Album | Artist(s) | Label | Ref. |
|---|---|---|---|---|
| January 4 | The Singing Nun | Soeur Sourire, The Singing Nun | Philips | |
| January 11 | The Singing Nun | Soeur Sourire, The Singing Nun | Philips | |
| January 18 | The Singing Nun | Soeur Sourire, The Singing Nun | Philips | |
| January 25 | The Singing Nun | Soeur Sourire, The Singing Nun | Philips | |
| February 1 | The Singing Nun | Soeur Sourire, The Singing Nun | Philips | |
| February 8 | The Singing Nun | Soeur Sourire, The Singing Nun | Philips | |
| February 15 | Meet the Beatles! | The Beatles | Capitol | |
| February 22 | Meet the Beatles! | The Beatles | Capitol | |
| February 29 | Meet the Beatles! | The Beatles | Capitol | |
| March 7 | Meet the Beatles! | The Beatles | Capitol | |
| March 14 | Meet the Beatles! | The Beatles | Capitol | |
| March 21 | Meet the Beatles! | The Beatles | Capitol | |
| March 28 | Meet the Beatles! | The Beatles | Capitol | |
| April 4 | Meet the Beatles! | The Beatles | Capitol | |
| April 11 | Meet the Beatles! | The Beatles | Capitol | |
| April 18 | Meet the Beatles! | The Beatles | Capitol | |
| April 25 | Meet the Beatles! | The Beatles | Capitol | |
| May 2 | The Beatles' Second Album | The Beatles | Capitol | |
| May 9 | The Beatles' Second Album | The Beatles | Capitol | |
| May 16 | The Beatles' Second Album | The Beatles | Capitol | |
| May 23 | The Beatles' Second Album | The Beatles | Capitol | |
| May 30 | The Beatles' Second Album | The Beatles | Capitol | |
| June 6 | Hello, Dolly! † | Original Cast | RCA Victor | |
| June 13 | Hello, Dolly! | Louis Armstrong | Kapp | |
| June 20 | Hello, Dolly! | Louis Armstrong | Kapp | |
| June 27 | Hello, Dolly! | Louis Armstrong | Kapp | |
| July 4 | Hello, Dolly! | Louis Armstrong | Kapp | |
| July 11 | Hello, Dolly! | Louis Armstrong | Kapp | |
| July 18 | Hello, Dolly! | Louis Armstrong | Kapp | |
| July 25 | A Hard Day's Night | The Beatles / Soundtrack | United Artists | |
| August 1 | A Hard Day's Night | The Beatles / Soundtrack | United Artists | |
| August 8 | A Hard Day's Night | The Beatles / Soundtrack | United Artists | |
| August 15 | A Hard Day's Night | The Beatles / Soundtrack | United Artists | |
| August 22 | A Hard Day's Night | The Beatles / Soundtrack | United Artists | |
| August 29 | A Hard Day's Night | The Beatles / Soundtrack | United Artists | |
| September 5 | A Hard Day's Night | The Beatles / Soundtrack | United Artists | |
| September 12 | A Hard Day's Night | The Beatles / Soundtrack | United Artists | |
| September 19 | A Hard Day's Night | The Beatles / Soundtrack | United Artists | |
| September 26 | A Hard Day's Night | The Beatles / Soundtrack | United Artists | |
| October 3 | A Hard Day's Night | The Beatles / Soundtrack | United Artists | |
| October 10 | A Hard Day's Night | The Beatles / Soundtrack | United Artists | |
| October 17 | A Hard Day's Night | The Beatles / Soundtrack | United Artists | |
| October 24 | A Hard Day's Night | The Beatles / Soundtrack | United Artists | |
| October 31 | People | Barbra Streisand | Columbia | |
| November 7 | People | Barbra Streisand | Columbia | |
| November 14 | People | Barbra Streisand | Columbia | |
| November 21 | People | Barbra Streisand | Columbia | |
| November 28 | People | Barbra Streisand | Columbia | |
| December 5 | Beach Boys Concert | The Beach Boys | Capitol | |
| December 12 | Beach Boys Concert | The Beach Boys | Capitol | |
| December 19 | Beach Boys Concert | The Beach Boys | Capitol | |
| December 26 | Beach Boys Concert | The Beach Boys | Capitol | |

== See also ==
- 1964 in music
- List of number-one albums (United States)
