= List of Canadian number-one albums of 1963 =

Here's a list of not all, but some of the number albums to come out of the year 1963 in the country of Canada.

== Albums ==
Date	Title	Artist	Ref
May 27	Summer Holiday	Sound Track	
June 3	Summer Holiday	Sound Track	
June 10	Summer Holiday	Sound Track	
June 17	Days of Wine and Roses	Andy Williams	
June 24	Surfin' U.S.A.	The Beach Boys	
July 1	Days of Wine and Roses	Andy Williams	
July 8	On Your Mark, Get Set	Cliff Richard	
July 15	On Your Mark, Get Set	Cliff Richard	
July 22	On Your Mark, Get Set	Cliff Richard	
July 29	On Your Mark, Get Set	Cliff Richard	
August 5	Surfin' U.S.A.	The Beach Boys	
August 12	Surfin' U.S.A.	The Beach Boys	
August 19	On Your Mark, Get Set	Cliff Richard	
August 26	On Your Mark, Get Set	Cliff Richard	
September 2	My Son, The Nut	Allan Sherman	
September 9	My Son, The Nut	Allan Sherman	
September 16	My Son, The Nut	Allan Sherman	
September 23	My Son, The Nut	Allan Sherman	
September 30	My Son, The Nut	Allan Sherman	
October 7	My Son, The Nut	Allan Sherman	
October 14	Living Doll	Cliff Richard	
October 21	Living Doll	Cliff Richard	
October 28	Living Doll	Cliff Richard	
November 4	In The Wind	Peter, Paul & Mary	
November 11	In The Wind	Peter, Paul & Mary	
November 18	In The Wind	Peter, Paul & Mary	
November 25	In The Wind	Peter, Paul & Mary	
December 2	In The Wind	Peter, Paul & Mary	
December 9	The Singing Nun	Souer Sourire	
December 16	The Singing Nun	Souer Sourire	
December 23	The Singing Nun	Souer Sourire	
December 30	The Singing Nun	Souer Sourire	
