= Songs I Sing on The Jackie Gleason Show =

Studio album by Frank Fontaine
- Released: January 7, 1963
- Recorded: 1962
- Studio: Bell Sound Studios, New York City, New York, US
- Genre: Vocal pop
- Length: 32:43
- Language: English
- Label: ABC-Paramount
- Producer: Sid Feller

Frank Fontaine chronology
Songs I Sing on The Jackie Gleason Show (1963)	Sings Like Crazy (1963)

Songs I Sing on The Jackie Gleason Show is the debut album by American comedian Frank Fontaine released in 1963.

== Reception ==
Released in January, this album sold over 300,000 copies in its first month and went gold by May 1968. This was the tenth debut album to top the Billboard 200, and stayed on the top spot from March 16 to April 13. The recording received promotion on The Jackie Gleason Show, leading to international release.

Editors at AllMusic rated this album 4.5 out of 5 stars.

== Track listing ==
1. "When Your Hair Has Turned to Silver" (Peter DeRose and Charles Tobias) – 2:27
2. "I'm Forever Blowing Bubbles" (Jaan Kenbrovin and John W. Kellette) – 2:40
3. "That Old Gang of Mine" (Mort Dixon, Ray Henderson, and Billy Rose) – 2:36
4. "Daddy's Little Girl" (Bobby Burke) – 2:50
5. "If You Were the Only Girl in the World" (Nat D. Ayer and Clifford Grey) – 3:15
6. "Mary's a Grand Old Name" (George M. Cohan) – 2:38
7. "(The Gang That Sang) Heart of My Heart" (Ben Ryan) – 2:27
8. "I Wonder Who's Kissing Her Now" (Frank R. Adams, Joe E. Howard, and Will M. Hough) – 2:32
9. "Beautiful" (Frank Fontaine, Joe Riccitelli, and Murray Todris) – 3:06
10. "If I Had My Way" (James Kendis and Lou Klein) – 2:46
11. "Always" (Irving Berlin) – 2:44
12. "Easter Parade" (Berlin) – 2:42

== Personnel ==
- Frank Fontaine – vocals
- ARW Productions – cover design
- Sid Feller – arrangement on "I'm Forever Blowing Bubbles", "Daddy's Little Girl", "Mary's a Grand Old Name", "(The Gang That Sang) Heart of My Heart", "I Wonder Who's Kissing Her Now", "If I Had My Way", and "Easter Parade"; production
- Jackie Gleason – liner notes
- Joe Lebow – liner design
- Maurice Seymour – cover photography
- Eddie Smith – engineering
- Sammy Spear – orchestra conducting
- Bill Stegmeyer – arrangement on "When Your Hair Has Turned to Silver", "That Old Gang of Mine", "If You Were the Only Girl in the World", "Beautiful", and "Always"

== See also ==
- List of 1963 albums
- List of Billboard 200 number-one albums of 1963
