= The Singing Nun (film) =

1966 American film

- Theatrical release poster
- Directed by: Henry Koster
- Screenplay by: John Furia Jr.; Sally Benson
- Story by: John Furia Jr.
- Produced by: John Beck
- Starring: Debbie Reynolds; Ricardo Montalbán; Greer Garson
- Cinematography: Milton Krasner
- Edited by: Rita Roland
- Music by: Jeanine Deckers (songs); Harry Sukman
- Distributed by: Metro-Goldwyn-Mayer
- Release date: April 4, 1966
- Running time: 97 minutes
- Country: United States
- Language: English
- Box office: $3.8 million (est. US/ Canada rentals)

The Singing Nun is a 1966 American semi-biographical musical drama film about the life of Jeanne-Paule Marie Deckers, the religious sister who recorded the chart-topping song Dominique. Directed by Henry Koster, in his final film, it starred Debbie Reynolds in the title role, and features Ricardo Montalbán, Greer Garson, Katharine Ross, Chad Everett, and Ed Sullivan as himself.

Harry Sukman was nominated for the Academy Award for Best Music, Scoring of Music, Adaptation or Treatment. The film featured nine songs by Deckers (credited as Soeur Sourire), of which five had English verses as translated by Randy Sparks, who also wrote two original songs and a third "inspired" by a Soeur Sourire song.

== Plot ==
Sister Ann (Debbie Reynolds) leaves the Dominican convent near Antwerp for her assignment at Samaritan House in a depressed area of Brussels. Sister Ann loves to play the guitar and sing, and when she joins in the traditional evening singalong at Samaritan House, she impresses the other sisters and Father Clementi (Ricardo Montalbán). She becomes fond of Dominic Arlien (Ricky Cordell), a motherless child whose father is an unemployed drunkard and who is loved only by his 17-year-old sister, Nicole (Katharine Ross). Sister Ann composes the song Dominique for the boy. Father Clementi persuades Robert Gerarde (Chad Everett), a partner in a recording firm, to listen to Sister Ann's music in the hope of having it recorded. When Robert meets Sister Ann, he discovers that she was his classmate at the Paris Conservatory of Music five years earlier. Later, while visiting the Arlien house, Sister Ann discovers pictures of Nicole in provocative poses; the girl defiantly tells the sister that she posed to get food and rent money for her family. Her father overhears them, strikes Nicole, and throws the sister out of the house. The prioress (Greer Garson) later admonishes Sister Ann for allowing the young girl's secret to be made known to the father. Robert, whose attraction to Sister Ann has been rekindled, obtains permission from church authorities to have her record an album; "Dominique" becomes a worldwide hit. Ed Sullivan brings a television crew to Brussels to film Sister Ann for his show; he gives the order a jeep for their African mission as compensation.

Sister Ann becomes confused by her success and by Robert's personal interest in her, and she seeks counsel from Father Clementi. Her decision is made for her when Dominic is seriously injured in an accident; she prays for him, promising to give up her music and care for others if he recovers. The boy recovers, and the Arlien family, shaken by the incident, decide to move to the country. Sister Ann gives Nicole her guitar and goes to Africa to work among the natives, driving from village to village in a jeep with the name "Dominique" blazoned across its tailgate.

== Cast ==
- Debbie Reynolds as Sister Ann
- Ricardo Montalbán as Father Clementi
- Greer Garson as Mother Prioress
- Agnes Moorehead as Sister Cluny
- Juanita Moore as Sister Mary
- Chad Everett as Robert Gerarde
- Katharine Ross as Nicole Arlien
- Tom Drake as Fitzpatrick
- Charles Robinson as Marauder
- Ed Sullivan as himself
- Ricky Cordell as Dominic Arlien
- Michael Pate as Mr. Arlien
- Larry D. Mann as Mr. Duvries
- Monique Montaigne as Sister Michele
- Joyce Vanderveen as Sister Elise
- Colette Jackson as Jeanette

== Production ==
Henry King was originally announced as director but left after differences with producer John Beck. He was replaced by Henry Koster.

Koster called it "probably the most difficult thing I ever did. Not the picture but the procedure of production. On that picture there was absolutely nothing but friction. I decided that this was the last thing I'd ever do. I never did another picture." Koster says the friction was mainly between producer John Beck and Debbie Reynolds.

== Soundtrack ==
- "Dominique" (Sourire-Sparks)
- "Sister Adele (Soeur Adele)" (Sourire-Sparks)
- "Avec Toi (With You I Shall Walk)" / "Alleluia" (Sourire)
- "Brother John" (Sparks)
- "Beyond The Stars (Entre Les Etoiles)" (Sourire-Sparks)
- "Lovely" (Sparks)
- "It's a Miracle (Une Fleur)" (Sourire-Sparks)
- "I'd Like to Be (Je Voudrais)" (Sourire)
- "Raindrops" (Sourire)
- "A Pied Piper (Petit Pierrot)" (Sourire-Sparks)
- "Put on Your Pretty Skirt (Mets Ton Joli Jupon)" (Sourire)
- "Dibwe Diambula Kabanda" / "Kyrie" (From "Missa Luba") (Haazen)

== See also ==
- List of American films of 1966
