= The Button-Down Mind of Bob Newhart =

1960 live comedy album

Live album by Bob Newhart
- Released: May 6, 1960
- Recorded: February 10, 1960
- Genre: Stand-up comedy
- Length: 31:55
- Label: Warner Bros.

Bob Newhart chronology
The Button-Down Mind of Bob Newhart (1960)	The Button-Down Mind Strikes Back (1960)

Professional ratings
Review scores
Source	Rating
AllMusic	5/5 stars

The Button-Down Mind of Bob Newhart is a 1960 live album by comedian Bob Newhart. Recorded at the Tidelands Club in Houston, Texas by recording engineer Bill Holford, Newhart's debut album reached No. 1 on the Billboard Mono Action Albums chart (later the Billboard 200) on August 1, 1960, and remained at the top for 14 weeks. In Canada, the album was No. 1 for 17 of 18 weeks between June 13 and October 10. The album stayed on the chart for two years, selling over 600,000 copies near release and ranking as the 20th best-selling album of all time on the Billboard charts. It won Album of the Year at the 1961 Grammy Awards, where Newhart was named Best New Artist; it was the first comedy album to win Album of the Year and the only time a comedian had won Best New Artist.

Newhart wanted the title to be The Most Celebrated New Comedian Since Attila the Hun, but Warner Bros. executives created the album's title and Newhart had to settle for his idea as a subtitle.

The album was a 2006 entry into the Library of Congress' National Recording Registry.

== In popular culture ==
Pete Campbell is seen listening to the album at the beginning of episode 4 of season 1 of Mad Men, "New Amsterdam".

In the pilot episode of The Marvelous Mrs. Maisel, Joel Maisel performs routines from the album at a cafe, passing them off as his own work. Set in 1958, two years before the album was released, this is either anachronistic or suggesting that Maisel had heard the works before the album's release.

== Track listing ==
1. "Abe Lincoln vs. Madison Avenue" – 7:31
  An ad man convinces President Lincoln not to change the text of the Gettysburg Address.
2. "The Cruise of the U.S.S. Codfish" – 5:01
  The captain of a nuclear submarine reflects on the crew's disastrous voyage.
3. "Merchandising the Wright Brothers" – 3:12
  A new product corporation helps Orville Wright market the brand-new airplane to potential passengers.
4. "The Krushchev Landing Rehearsal" – 4:47
  A television director runs through a rehearsal of Kruschchev's arrival to the United States.
5. "Driving Instructor" – 8:03
  A driving instructor risks life and limb when he has a woman named Mrs. Webb for a student.
6. "Nobody Will Ever Play Baseball" – 3:21
  A game manufacturer ridicules Abner Doubleday's invention of baseball as overly complicated.

== Certifications ==
Region	Certification	Certified units/sales
United States (RIAA)	Gold	500,000^{^}
^{^} Shipments figures based on certification alone.
