= Bob Newhart =

American comedian and actor (1929–2024)

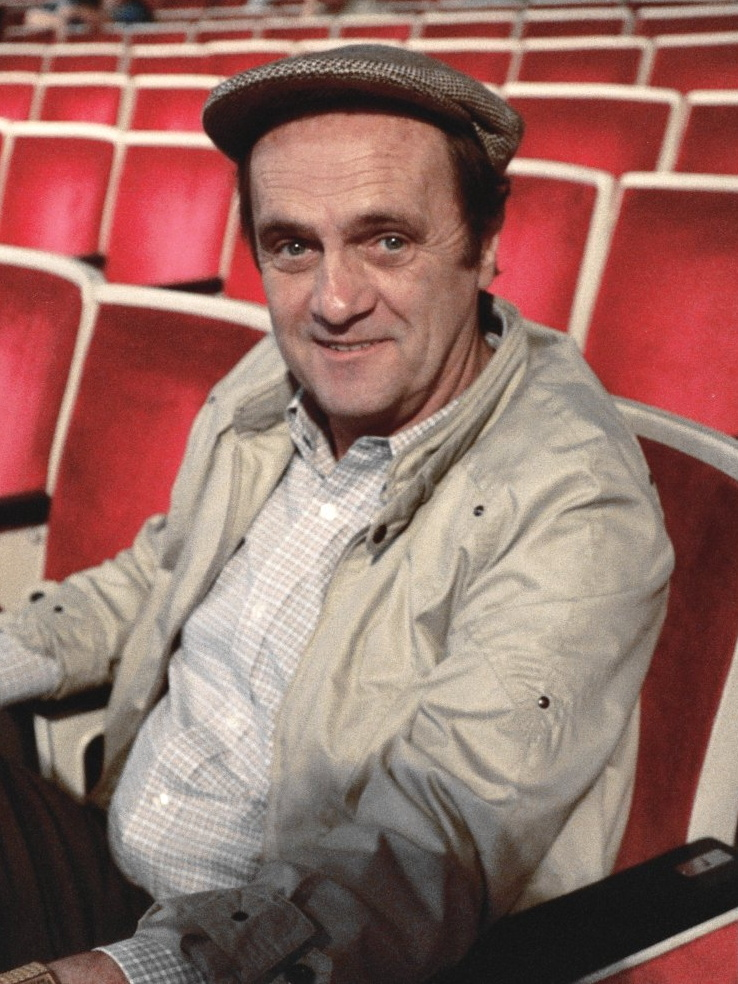
- Newhart at the 1987 Emmy Awards
- Born: George Robert Newhart; September 5, 1929; Oak Park, Illinois, U.S.
- Died: July 18, 2024 (aged 94); Los Angeles, California, U.S.
- Resting place: Forest Lawn Memorial Park, Hollywood Hills
- Education: Loyola University Chicago (BBA)
- Spouse: Virginia Quinn (m. 1963; died 2023)
- Children: 4
- Relatives: Paul Brittain (nephew); Bill Quinn (father-in-law)

Comedy career
- Years active: 1958–2020
- Medium: Stand-up; television; film
- Genres: Observational comedy; clean comedy; sketch comedy; deadpan; satire
- Subjects: American culture; everyday life; human behavior; social awkwardness; pop culture; current events
- Military service
- Service: United States Army
- Service years: 1952–1954
- Rank: Staff sergeant
- Unit: Armed Forces Radio Service
- Awards: Good Conduct Medal
- Website: bobnewhartofficial.com

George Robert Newhart (September 5, 1929 – July 18, 2024) was an American comedian and actor. Newhart was known for his deadpan and stammering delivery style. Beginning his career as a stand-up comedian, he transitioned his career to acting in television. He received three Grammy Awards, an Emmy Award, a Golden Globe Award, a Peabody Award, a Hollywood Walk of Fame Star, and the Mark Twain Prize for American Humor.

Newhart came to prominence in 1960 when his record album of comedic monologues, The Button-Down Mind of Bob Newhart, became a bestseller and reached number one on the Billboard pop album chart and won two Grammy Awards for Album of the Year, and Best New Artist. That same year he released his follow-up album, The Button-Down Mind Strikes Back! (1960), which was also a success, and the two albums held the Billboard number one and number two spots simultaneously. He later released several additional comedy albums.

Newhart hosted a short-lived NBC variety show, The Bob Newhart Show (1961), before starring as Chicago psychologist Robert Hartley on The Bob Newhart Show from 1972 to 1978. For the latter, he won the Golden Globe Award for Best Male TV Star. He then starred as Vermont innkeeper Dick Loudon on the series Newhart from 1982 to 1990, where he received three nominations for the Primetime Emmy Award for Outstanding Lead Actor in a Comedy Series. He also starred in two short-lived sitcoms, Bob (1992–1993) and George and Leo (1997–1998).

Newhart also acted in the films Hell Is for Heroes (1962), Hot Millions (1968), Catch-22 (1970), Cold Turkey (1971), In & Out (1997), and Elf (2003), and voiced Bernard in the Disney animated film The Rescuers (1977) and its sequel (1990). Newhart played Professor Proton on the CBS sitcom The Big Bang Theory from 2013 to 2018, for which he received his first-ever career Emmy Award, for the Outstanding Guest Actor in a Comedy Series. He also reprised his role in The Big Bang Theory prequel spin-off series Young Sheldon (2017–2020).

== Early life and education ==
George Robert Newhart was born on September 5, 1929, in Oak Park, Illinois. His parents were Julia Pauline (née Burns; 1901–1994), a housewife, and George David Newhart (1899–1987), a part-owner of a plumbing supply business. His mother was of Irish descent, while his father was of German and Irish descent. He went by his middle name, "Bob," to avoid confusion with his father. The family name Newhart is of German origin (Neuhart). One of his grandmothers was from St. Catharines, Ontario, Canada. He had three sisters.

Newhart was educated at Catholic schools in the Chicago area, including St. Catherine of Siena Grammar School in Oak Park, and attended St. Ignatius College Prep (high school), graduating in 1947. He then enrolled at Loyola University Chicago, from which he graduated in 1952 with a bachelor's degree in business management. Newhart was drafted into the U.S. Army and, until his discharge, in 1954, served as a U.S.-based clerk during the Korean War. He briefly attended Loyola University Chicago School of Law, but did not complete a degree, in part, he said, because he had been asked to behave unethically during an internship.

== Career ==
=== 1958–1971: Comedy albums and stardom ===
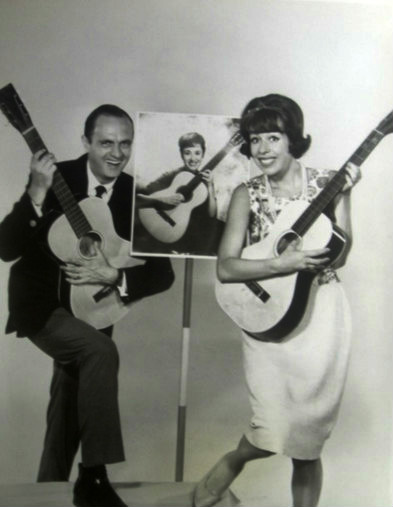
Newhart, Caterina Valente, and Carol Burnett in 1964

After the war, Newhart worked for United States Gypsum as an accountant. He later said that his motto, "That's close enough," and his habit of adjusting petty cash imbalances with his own money showed that he lacked the temperament of an accountant. In 1958, Newhart became an advertising copywriter for Fred A. Niles, a major independent film and television producer in Chicago. There, he and a co-worker entertained each other with long telephone calls about absurd scenarios, which they later recorded and sent to radio stations as audition tapes. When the co-worker ended his participation by taking a job in New York, Newhart continued the recordings alone, developing routines.

Dan Sorkin, a radio station disc jockey, who later became the announcer-sidekick on Newhart's NBC series, introduced Newhart to the head of talent at Warner Bros. Records. Based solely on those recordings, the label signed him in 1959, only a year after it had come into existence. Newhart expanded his material into a stand-up routine that he began to perform at nightclubs. He became famous mostly on the strength of his audio releases, in which he played a solo "straight man". Newhart's routine was to portray one end of a conversation (usually a phone call), playing the comedic straight man while implying what the other person was saying. Newhart's 1960 comedy album The Button-Down Mind of Bob Newhart was the first comedy album to make number one on the Billboard charts and peaked at number two in the UK Albums Chart. It won two Grammy Awards, Album of the Year, and Best New Artist.

Newhart told a 2005 interviewer for PBS's American Masters that his favorite stand-up routine was "Abe Lincoln vs. Madison Avenue", which appears on this album. In the routine, a slick promoter has to deal with Lincoln's reluctance to agree to efforts to boost his image. Chicago TV director and future comedian Bill Daily, who was Newhart's castmate on The Bob Newhart Show, suggested the routine to him. A follow-up album, The Button-Down Mind Strikes Back!, was released six months later and won Best Comedy Performance – Spoken Word that year. His subsequent comedy albums include Behind the Button-Down Mind of Bob Newhart (1961), The Button-Down Mind on TV (1962), Bob Newhart Faces Bob Newhart (1964), The Windmills Are Weakening (1965), This Is It (1967), Best of Bob Newhart (1971), and Very Funny Bob Newhart (1973). Years later, he released Bob Newhart Off the Record (1992), The Button-Down Concert (1997), and Something Like This (2001), an anthology of his 1960s Warner Bros. albums. On December 10, 2015, publicist and comedy album collector Jeff Abraham revealed that a "lost" Newhart track from 1965 about Paul Revere existed on a one-of-a-kind acetate, which he owns. The track made its world premiere on episode 163 of the Comedy on Vinyl podcast.

Newhart's success in stand-up led to his own short-lived NBC variety show in 1961, The Bob Newhart Show. The show lasted only a single season, but it earned Newhart a Primetime Emmy Award nomination and a Peabody Award. The Peabody Board cited him as "a person whose gentle satire and wry and irreverent wit waft a breath of fresh and bracing air through the stale and stuffy electronic corridors. A merry marauder, who looks less like St. George than a choirboy, Newhart has wounded, if not slain, many of the dragons that stalk our society. In a troubled and apprehensive world, Newhart has proved once again that laughter is the best medicine." In the mid-1960s, Newhart was one of the initial three co-hosts of the variety show The Entertainers (1964), with Carol Burnett and Caterina Valente, appeared on The Dean Martin Show 24 times and on The Ed Sullivan Show eight times. He appeared in a 1963 episode of The Alfred Hitchcock Hour, "How to Get Rid of Your Wife"; and on The Judy Garland Show. He also appeared on series such as Bob Hope Presents the Chrysler Theatre, Captain Nice, and Insight. Newhart guest-hosted The Tonight Show Starring Johnny Carson 87 times, and hosted Saturday Night Live twice, in 1980 and 1995. In 1964, he appeared at the Royal Variety Performance in London, before Queen Elizabeth II.

In 1962, Newhart filmed An Evening with Bob Newhart, thought to be the first pay-per-view television special, for Canadian-based Telemeter.

=== 1972–1978: The Bob Newhart Show ===
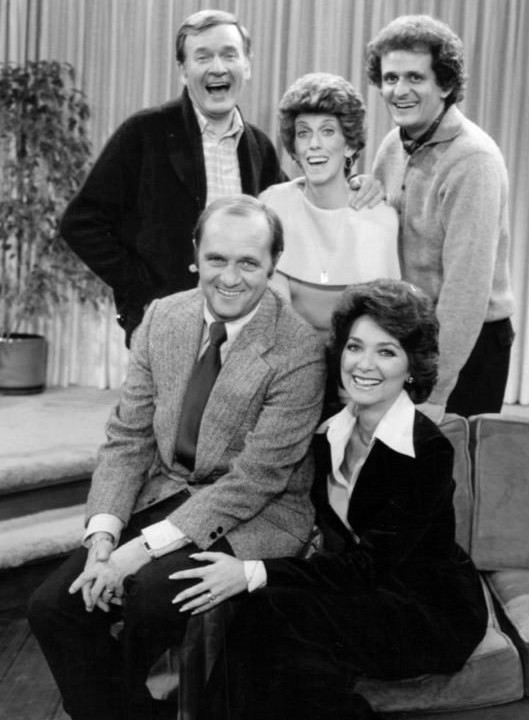
The cast of The Bob Newhart Show; standing (from left): Bill Daily, Marcia Wallace, Peter Bonerz; seated: Newhart and Suzanne Pleshette

Newhart starred in two long-running sitcoms. In 1972, soon after he guest-starred on The Smothers Brothers Comedy Hour, he was approached by his agent and his managers, producer Grant Tinker, and actress Mary Tyler Moore (the husband/wife team who founded MTM Enterprises), to work on a series called The Bob Newhart Show, to be written by David Davis and Lorenzo Music. He was very interested in the starring role of psychologist Bob Hartley, with Suzanne Pleshette playing his wry, loving wife Emily and Bill Daily as neighbor and friend Howard Borden.

The Bob Newhart Show was a part of the CBS comedy lineup on Saturday Night consisting of All in the Family, M*A*S*H, The Mary Tyler Moore Show, and The Carol Burnett Show. The series was an immediate hit. The show eventually referenced what made Newhart's name in the first place; apart from the first few episodes, it used an opening-credits sequence featuring Newhart answering a telephone in his office. According to co-star Marcia Wallace, the entire cast got along well, and Newhart became close friends with both Wallace and co-star Suzanne Pleshette.

In addition to Wallace as Bob's wisecracking, man-chasing receptionist Carol Kester, the cast included Peter Bonerz as amiable orthodontist Jerry Robinson; Jack Riley as Elliot Carlin, the most misanthropic of Hartley's patients; character actor and voice artist John Fiedler as milquetoast Emil Petersen; and Pat Finley as Bob's sister, Ellen Hartley, a love interest for Howard Borden. Future Newhart regular Tom Poston had a briefly recurring role as Cliff "Peeper" Murdock, veteran stage actor Barnard Hughes appeared as Bob's father for three episodes spread over two seasons, and Martha Scott appeared in several episodes as Bob's mother.

By 1977, the show's ratings were declining and Newhart wanted to end it but was under contract to do one more season. The show's writers tried to rework the sitcom by adding a pregnancy, but Newhart objected: "I told the creators I didn't want any children, because I didn't want it to be a show about 'How stupid Daddy is, but we love him so much, let's get him out of the trouble he's gotten himself into'." Nevertheless, the staff wrote an episode that they hoped would change Newhart's mind. Newhart read the script and he agreed it was very funny. He then asked, "Who are you going to get to play Bob?" Coincidentally, Newhart's wife gave birth to their daughter Jenny late in the year, which caused him to miss several episodes.

In the last episode of the fifth season, not only was Bob's wife Emily, pregnant, but his receptionist Carol was, too. In the first show of the sixth season, Bob revealed his dream of the pregnancies and that neither Emily nor Carol was really pregnant. Marcia Wallace spoke of Newhart's amiable nature on set: "He's very low key, and he didn't want to cause trouble. I had a dog by the name of Maggie that I used to bring to the set. And whenever there was a line that Bob didn't like—he didn't want to complain too much—so, he'd go over, get down on his hands and knees, and repeat the line to the dog, which invariably yawned; and he'd say, "See, I told you it's not funny!". Wallace also commented on the show's lack of Emmy recognition: "People think we were nominated for many an Emmy, people presume we won Emmys, all of us, and certainly Bob, and certainly the show. Nope, never!" Newhart discontinued the series in 1978 after six seasons and 142 episodes. Wallace said of its ending, "It was much crying and sobbing. It was so sad. We really did get along. We really had great times together."

Of Newhart's other long-running sitcom Newhart, Wallace said: "But some of the other great comedic talents who had a brilliant show, when they tried to do it twice, it didn't always work. And that's what... but like Bob, as far as I'm concerned, Bob is like the Fred Astaire of comics. He just makes it look so easy, and he's not as in-your-face as some might be. And so, you just kind of take it for granted, how extraordinarily funny and how he wears well." She was later reunited with Newhart twice, once in a reprise of her role as Carol on Murphy Brown in 1994, and on an episode of Newhart's short-lived sitcom, George & Leo, in 1997.

Although primarily a television star, Newhart appeared in a number of popular films, beginning with the 1959 war story Hell Is for Heroes (where he did his one-sided telephone act in a bunker). In 1968, Newhart played an annoying software specialist in the film Hot Millions. His films include 1970's Alan Jay Lerner musical On a Clear Day You Can See Forever, the 1971 Norman Lear comedy Cold Turkey, Mike Nichols's war satire Catch-22, the 1977 Disney animated feature The Rescuers and its 1990 sequel The Rescuers Down Under as the voice of Bernard, and he played the president of the United States in the comedy First Family (1980).

=== 1982–1990: Newhart ===
By 1982, Newhart was interested in a new sitcom. After he had discussions with Barry Kemp and CBS, the show Newhart was created, in which Newhart played Vermont innkeeper and TV talk show host Dick Loudon. Mary Frann was cast as his wife, Joanna. Jennifer Holmes was originally cast as Leslie Vanderkellen, but left after former daytime soap star Julia Duffy joined the cast as Dick's inn maid and spoiled rich girl, Stephanie Vanderkellen. Peter Scolari (who had been a fan of Newhart's since he was 17) was also cast as Dick's manipulative TV producer, Michael Harris, in six of the eight seasons. Steven Kampmann, who was a neighbor for a while, was cast as Kirk Devane for two years, at a cafe he owned; he was replaced by William Sanderson as Larry, who ran the cafe with his two mute brothers (both named Darryl). Character actor Tom Poston played the role of handyman George Utley, earning three Primetime Emmy Award nominations as Outstanding Supporting Actor in a Comedy Series in 1984, 1986, and 1987. Like The Bob Newhart Show, Newhart was an immediate hit, and again, like the show before it, it was also nominated for Primetime Emmy Awards but failed to win any. During the time Newhart was working on the show, in 1985, his smoking habit finally caught up to him, and he was taken to the emergency room for secondary polycythemia. The doctors ordered him to stop smoking.

In 1987, ratings began to drop. Newhart ended in 1990 after eight seasons and 182 episodes. The last episode ended with a scene in which Newhart wakes up in bed with Suzanne Pleshette, who played Emily, his wife from The Bob Newhart Show. He realizes (in a satire of a famous plot element in the television series Dallas a few years earlier) that the entire eight-year Newhart series had been a single nightmare of Dr. Bob Hartley's, which Emily attributes to eating Japanese food before he went to bed. Recalling Mary Frann's buxom figure and proclivity for wearing sweaters, Bob closes the segment and the series by telling Emily, "You really should wear more sweaters" before the typical closing notes of the old Bob Newhart Show theme played over the fadeout. The twist ending was later chosen by TV Guide as the best finale in television history. With the exception of the series finale, Newhart simply said "meow" in the MTM Productions closing logo on all episodes. The finale's logo used a sound clip of the two brothers named Darryl shouting "QUIET!!!" in unison; prior to this, only their brother Larry ever spoke a word while they remained silent.

=== 1991–2012: Established career ===
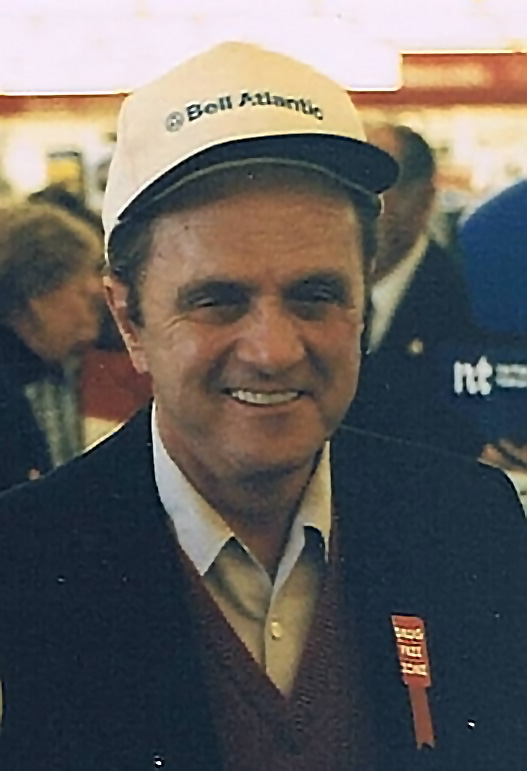
In Norfolk, Virginia, c. 1991

In addition to stand-up comedy, Newhart became a dedicated character actor in film and television. Newhart played a beleaguered school principal in In & Out (1997), acted in the Will Ferrell Christmas comedy film Elf (2003), and made a cameo appearance as a sadistic but appreciative CEO at the end of the comedy Horrible Bosses (2011). He appeared on It's Garry Shandling's Show and Committed, reprised his role as Dr. Bob Hartley on Murphy Brown, and appeared as himself on The Simpsons. Newhart had a role on NCIS as Ducky's mentor and predecessor, a retired forensic pathologist, who was discovered to have Alzheimer's disease.

In 1992, Newhart returned to television with a series about a cartoonist called Bob. The ensemble cast included Lisa Kudrow, but the show did not develop a strong audience and was cancelled shortly after the start of its second season, despite good critical reviews. On The Tonight Show following the cancellation, Newhart joked he had now done shows called The Bob Newhart Show, Newhart, and Bob so that his next show was going to be called The. In 1997, Newhart returned again with George & Leo on CBS with Judd Hirsch and Jason Bateman (Newhart's first name being George); the show was cancelled during its first season. In 1995, Newhart was approached by Showtime to make the first comedy special of his 35-year career, Off the Record, which consisted of him performing material from his first and second albums in front of an audience in Pasadena, California.

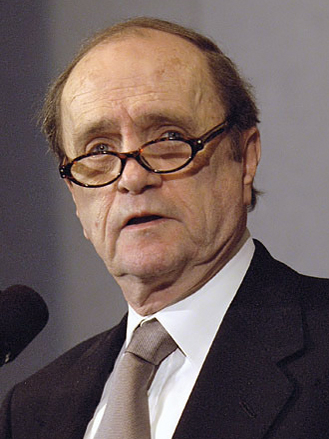
Newhart in 2004

In 2003, Newhart guest-starred on three episodes of ER in a rare dramatic role that earned him a Primetime Emmy Award nomination, his first in nearly 20 years. In 2005, he began a recurring role in Desperate Housewives as Morty, the on-again/off-again boyfriend of Sophie (Lesley Ann Warren), Susan Mayer's (Teri Hatcher) mother. In 2009, he received another Primetime Emmy nomination for reprising his role as Judson in The Librarian: Curse of the Judas Chalice. On August 27, 2006, at the 58th Primetime Emmy Awards, hosted by Conan O'Brien, Newhart was placed in a supposedly airtight glass prison that contained three hours of air. If the Emmys went over the time of three hours, he would die. This gag was an acknowledgment of the common frustration that award shows usually run on past their allotted time (usually three hours). Newhart "survived" his containment to help O'Brien present the award for Outstanding Comedy Series (which went to The Office). During an episode of Jimmy Kimmel Live!, Newhart made a comedic cameo with members of the ABC show Lost lampooning an alternate ending to the series finale. In 2011, he appeared in a small but pivotal role as a doctor in Lifetime's anthology film on breast cancer, Five.

=== 2013–2020: The Big Bang Theory and final roles ===
In 2013, Newhart appeared in an episode of the sixth season of The Big Bang Theory playing the aged Professor Proton (Arthur Jeffries), a former science TV show host turned children's party entertainer, for which he was awarded a Primetime Emmy Award. It was Newhart's first Emmy. At that year's Emmy ceremony, Newhart appeared as a presenter with The Big Bang Theory star Jim Parsons and received a standing ovation. He continued to play the character periodically until the show's 12th and final season and on its accompanying series Young Sheldon. On December 19, 2014, the 85-year-old Newhart made a surprise appearance on the final episode of The Late Late Show with Craig Ferguson, where he was revealed to be the person inside Secretariat, Ferguson's on-set pantomime horse. The show then ended with a scene parodying the Newhart series finale, with Ferguson and Drew Carey reprising their roles from The Drew Carey Show. In June 2015, Newhart appeared on another series finale, that of Hot in Cleveland, playing the father-in-law of Joy Scroggs (Jane Leeves). It marked a reunion with Betty White, who was a cast member during the second season of Bob 23 years earlier. The finale ends with their characters getting married.

== Comedic style ==
Newhart was known for his deadpan delivery and a slight stammer that he incorporated early on into the persona around which he built a successful career. The hesitant stammer was his natural speaking style – "Truly, that's ... the ... way I talk" – and he used it to build tension in the audience, "Tension is very important to comedy. And the release of the tension – that's the laugh."

On his TV shows, although he got his share of funny lines, he worked often in the Jack Benny tradition of being the "straight man" while the sometimes rather bizarre cast members surrounding him got the laughs. But Newhart said, "I was not influenced by Jack Benny", and cited George Gobel and Bob and Ray as his initial writing and performance inspirations.

Several of his routines involved hearing half of a conversation as he spoke to someone on the phone. In a bit called "King Kong", a rookie security guard at the Empire State Building seeks guidance as to how to deal with an ape that is "between 18 and 19 stories high, depending on whether there's a 13th floor or not." He assured his boss he has looked in the guards' manual "under 'ape' and 'ape's toes'." His other famous routines included "The Driving Instructor", "The Mrs. Grace L. Ferguson Airline (and Storm Door Company)", "Introducing Tobacco to Civilization", "Abe Lincoln vs. Madison Avenue", "Defusing a Bomb" (in which an uneasy police chief tries to walk a new and nervous patrolman through defusing a live shell discovered on a beach), "The Retirement Party", "Ledge Psychology", "The Khrushchev Landing Rehearsal", and "A Friend with a Dog".

In a 2012 podcast interview with Marc Maron, comedian Shelley Berman accused Newhart of plagiarizing his improvisational telephone routine style (although not any actual material of Berman's). However, in interviews both years before and after Berman's comments, Newhart never took credit for originating the telephone concept, which he noted was done earlier by Berman and – predating Berman – Nichols and May, George Jessel (in his well-known sketch "Hello Mama"), and in the 1913 recording "Cohen on the Telephone". Starting in the 1940s, Arlene Harris also built a long radio and TV career around her one-sided telephone conversations, and the technique was later also used by Lily Tomlin, Ellen DeGeneres, and others.

== Personal life ==
=== Family life ===
On January 12, 1963, Newhart married Virginia Lillian "Ginnie" Quinn (December 9, 1940 – April 23, 2023). She was a daughter of character actor Bill Quinn, and met Newhart via an introduction by comedian Buddy Hackett. The couple had four children: Robert (born 1963), Timothy (born 1967), Jennifer (born 1971), and Courtney (born 1977), followed by 10 grandchildren. Both Catholics, the couple raised their children in that faith. Bob was a member of the Church of the Good Shepherd and the related Catholic Motion Picture Guild in Beverly Hills, California. Ginnie died at age 82 on April 23, 2023.

Newhart was the uncle of actor and comedian Paul Brittain.

The Newhart and Rickles families were close, often vacationing together. Don Rickles and Newhart appeared together on The Tonight Show with Jay Leno on January 24, 2005, the Monday following Johnny Carson's death, reminiscing about their many appearances on Carson's show. The two also appeared together on the television sitcom Newhart and for previous episodes of The Tonight Show, where Newhart or Rickles were guest hosts. The friendship was memorialized in Bob & Don: A Love Story, a 2023 short documentary film by Judd Apatow, released by The New Yorker, featuring interviews, as well as home videos, with both families.

For over 25 years, Newhart's family lived in a mansion in Bel Air. The house was designed by Wallace Neff in a French Country style. The 9,169-square-foot (851.8 m^{2}), five-bedroom home featured formal gardens, a lagoon-style pool with waterfall, and guest apartment. Newhart sold the property to developers in May 2016 for $14.5 million. The new property owners razed the mansion and sold the empty 1.37-acre (0.55 ha) lot for $17.65 million in 2017.

=== Interests ===
In 1995, Newhart was one of several investors in Rotijefco (a blend of his children's names), which bought radio station KKSB (AM 1290 kHz) in Santa Barbara, California. Its format was changed to adult standards and its call sign to KZBN (his initials). In 2005, Rotijefco sold the station to Santa Barbara Broadcasting, which changed its call sign to KZSB and format to news and talk radio.

Newhart was an early home-computer hobbyist, purchasing the Commodore PET after its 1977 introduction. In 2001, he wrote, "Later, I moved up to the 64 KB model and thought that was silly because it was more memory than I would ever possibly need."

== Health, death and tributes ==
In 1985, Newhart was hospitalized for secondary polycythemia, a condition attributed to his years of heavy smoking. He recovered after several weeks and eventually quit smoking.

Newhart died from complications of several short illnesses at his home in Los Angeles on July 18, 2024, at the age of 94. Upon his death, President Joe Biden released a statement which read, "Today, we mourn the loss of Bob Newhart, a comedy legend and beloved performer who kept Americans laughing for decades." Those who paid tributes to Newhart included Reese Witherspoon, James Woods, Julie Bowen, Carol Burnett, Conan O'Brien, Alec Baldwin, Judd Apatow, Al Franken, Mark Hamill, Jamie Lee Curtis, Zooey Deschanel, and his The Big Bang Theory and Young Sheldon co-stars—Kaley Cuoco, Mayim Bialik, Kunal Nayyar and Iain Armitage.

He was buried at the Forest Lawn Memorial Park (Hollywood Hills).

== Filmography ==
=== Film ===
Film work by Bob Newhart
Year	Title	Role	Notes
1962	Hell Is for Heroes	Private First Class James E. Driscoll	
1968	Hot Millions	Willard C. Gnatpole	
1970	On a Clear Day You Can See Forever	Dr. Mason Hume	
1970	Catch-22	Major Major	
1971	Cold Turkey	Merwin Wren	
1977	The Rescuers	Bernard	Voice
1980	Little Miss Marker	Regret	
1980	First Family	President Manfred Link	
1990	The Rescuers Down Under	Bernard	Voice
1997	In & Out	Tom Halliwell	
1998	Rudolph the Red-Nosed Reindeer: The Movie	Leonard the Polar Bear	Voice
2003	Legally Blonde 2: Red, White & Blonde	Sid Post	
2003	Elf	Papa Elf	
2007	Mr. Warmth: The Don Rickles Project	Himself	Documentary
2011	Horrible Bosses	Lou Sherman	Cameo
2012	Excavating the 2000 Year Old Man	Himself	Documentary
2013	Richard Pryor: Omit the Logic	Himself	Documentary
2023	Once Upon a Studio	Bernard	Voice, short film; archival audio

=== Television ===
Television work by Bob Newhart
Year	Title	Role	Notes
1960–1962	The Ed Sullivan Show	Comedian	4 episodes
1961–1962	The Bob Newhart Show	Himself, Host	Variety series; 27 episodes
1962	An Evening with Bob Newhart	Himself, Host	Pay-per-view television special
1963	The Alfred Hitchcock Hour	Gerald Swinney	Episode: "How to Get Rid of Your Wife"
1963	The Judy Garland Show	Guest	Episode #1.14
1964	The Entertainers	Himself, Co-Host	
1965	Bob Hope Presents the Chrysler Theatre	Charles Fenton	Episode: "Simon Says Get Married"
1967	Captain Nice	Lloyd Larchmont	Episode: "One Rotten Apple"
1967	A Funny Thing Happened on the Way to Hollywood	Guest	Television film
1968–1970	Rowan & Martin's Laugh-In	Guest Performer	3 episodes
1971	Decisions! Decisions!	John Hobson	Television film
1972	The Don Rickles Show	Jerry, Brother-in-Law	Episode: "Where There's a Will"
1973	Insight	Marvin Halprin	Episode: "Happy Birthday Marvin"
1974	Thursday's Game	Marvin Ellison	Television film
1972–1978	The Bob Newhart Show	Dr. Robert "Bob" Hartley	142 episodes
1979	Insight	God	Episode: "Packy"
1980	Marathon	Walter Burton	Television film
1980, 1995	Saturday Night Live	Host	2 episodes
1982–1990	Newhart	Dick Loudon	184 episodes
1991	The Bob Newhart Show: The 19th Anniversary Special	Dr. Robert "Bob" Hartley	Television special
1991	The Entertainers	Todd Wilson	Television film
1992	Bob Newhart: Off the Record	Himself, Host	Television special
1992–1993	Bob	Bob McKay	33 episodes
1994	Murphy Brown	Dr. Robert "Bob" Hartley	Episode: "Anything But Cured"
1996	The Simpsons	Himself	Voice, episode: "Bart the Fink"
1997–1998	George and Leo	George Stoody	22 episodes
2001	Mad TV	Psychotherapist	Episode #6.24
2001	Untitled Sisqo Project	Bob Newhart	NBC sitcom pilot
2001	The Sports Pages	Doc Waddems	Television film
2003	ER	Ben Hollander	3 episodes
2004	The Librarian: Quest for the Spear	Judson	Television film
2005	Desperate Housewives	Morty Flickman	3 episodes
2005	Committed	Blinky	Episode: "The Return of Todd Episode"
2006	The Librarian: Return to King Solomon's Mines	Judson	Television film
2008	The Librarian: Curse of the Judas Chalice	Judson	Television film
2011	NCIS	Doctor Walter Magnus	Episode: "Recruited"
2011	Five	Dr. Roth	Television film
2013–2018	The Big Bang Theory	Arthur Jeffries / Professor Proton	Season 6, Episode 22: "The Proton Resurgence"; Season 7, Episode 7: "The Proton Displacement"; Season 7, Episode 22: "The Proton Transmogrification"; Season 9, Episode 11: "The Opening Night Excitation"; Season 11, Episode 6: "The Proton Regeneration"; Season 12, Episode 5: "The Planetarium Collision"
2014	Don Rickles: One Night Only	Himself	Pre-recorded appearance
2014	The Late Late Show with Craig Ferguson	Secretariat / Himself	Episode: "Final Show"
2015	Hot in Cleveland	Bob Sr.	Episode: "Vegas Baby/I Hate Goodbyes"
2014–2017	The Librarians	Judson	3 episodes
2017–2020	Young Sheldon	Arthur Jeffries / Professor Proton	3 episodes
2024	Bob Newhart: A Legacy of Laughter	Himself	Retrospective

== Discography ==
=== Live albums ===
Year	Title	Studio	Formats	Ref.
1960	The Button-Down Mind of Bob Newhart	Warner Bros. Records	LP/CD/Streaming	
1960	The Button-Down Mind Strikes Back!	Warner Bros. Records	LP/CD/Streaming	
1961	Behind the Button-Down Mind of Bob Newhart	Warner Bros. Records	LP/CD/Streaming	
1962	The Button-Down Mind on TV	Warner Bros. Records	LP	
1964	Bob Newhart Faces Bob Newhart	Warner Bros. Records	LP/CD/Streaming	
1965	The Windmills Are Weakening	Warner Bros. Records	LP/Streaming	
1967	This Is It!	Warner Bros. Records	LP/Streaming	
1997	Button-Down Concert	Nick at Nite Records	CD/DVD	

=== Compilation albums ===
- The Best of Bob Newhart (Warner Bros. Records, 1971)
- Masters (Warner Bros. Records, 1973)
- Bob Newhart (Pickwick Super Stars, 1980)
- Something Like This...: The Bob Newhart Anthology (Warner Bros./Rhino, 2001)

== Awards and nominations ==
Year	Association	Category	Performance	Result	Ref.
1961	Grammy Awards	Best New Artist	Bob Newhart	Won	
1961	Grammy Awards	Album of the Year	The Button-Down Mind of Bob Newhart	Won	
1961	Grammy Awards	Best Comedy Performance – Spoken	The Button-Down Mind Strikes Back!	Won	
1998	Grammy Awards	Best Comedy Album	Button Down Concert	Nominated	
2007	Grammy Awards	Best Spoken Word Album	I Shouldn't Even Be Doing This!	Nominated	
1962	Golden Globe Awards	Best TV Star – Male	The Bob Newhart Show	Won	
1974	Golden Globe Awards	Best Actor – Television Series Musical or Comedy	The Bob Newhart Show	Nominated	
1975	Golden Globe Awards	Best Actor – Television Series Musical or Comedy	The Bob Newhart Show	Nominated	
1982	Golden Globe Awards	Best Actor – Television Series Musical or Comedy	Newhart	Nominated	
1983	Golden Globe Awards	Best Actor – Television Series Musical or Comedy	Newhart	Nominated	
1984	Golden Globe Awards	Best Actor – Television Series Musical or Comedy	Newhart	Nominated	
1985	Golden Globe Awards	Best Actor – Television Series Musical or Comedy	Newhart	Nominated	
1962	Primetime Emmy Awards	Outstanding Writing for a Comedy Series	The Bob Newhart Show	Nominated	
1985	Primetime Emmy Awards	Outstanding Lead Actor in a Comedy Series	Newhart	Nominated	
1986	Primetime Emmy Awards	Outstanding Lead Actor in a Comedy Series	Newhart	Nominated	
1987	Primetime Emmy Awards	Outstanding Lead Actor in a Comedy Series	Newhart	Nominated	
2004	Primetime Emmy Awards	Outstanding Guest Actor in a Drama Series	ER	Nominated	
2009	Primetime Emmy Awards	Outstanding Supporting Actor in a Limited Series	The Librarian: Curse of the Judas Chalice	Nominated	
2013	Primetime Emmy Awards	Outstanding Guest Actor in a Comedy Series	The Big Bang Theory	Won	
2014	Primetime Emmy Awards	Outstanding Guest Actor in a Comedy Series	The Big Bang Theory	Nominated	
2016	Primetime Emmy Awards	Outstanding Guest Actor in a Comedy Series	The Big Bang Theory	Nominated	

== Honorary awards ==
Organizations	Year	Award	Ref.
Academy of Television Arts & Sciences Hall of Fame	1993	Inductee	
TV Guide's "50 Greatest TV Stars of All Time" list	1996	Ranked number 17	
Billboard 200	1998	Ranked number 20	
Hollywood Walk of Fame	1999	Inductee	
Mark Twain Prize for American Humor	2002	Statue	
Comedy Central's 100 Greatest Stand-Ups	2004	Ranked number 14	
TV Land	2004	Statue	
Loyola University Chicago	2012	Naming their new theatre the Newhart Family Theatre	
International Cinematographers Guild	2015	Lifetime Achievement Award	
Edgewater Historical Society	2022	plaque celebrating "The Bob Newhart" show	
City of Chicago	2025	renaming section of Sheridan Road to Bob Newhart Way	

== Bibliography ==
On September 20, 2006, Hyperion Books released Newhart's first book I Shouldn't Even Be Doing This. The book is primarily a memoir but also features comic bits. Transcripts of many of Newhart's classic routines are woven into the text. Actor David Hyde Pierce said, "The only difference between Bob Newhart on stage and Bob Newhart offstage is that there is no stage".
