= The Button-Down Mind Strikes Back! =

The Button-Down Mind Strikes Back

Live album by Bob Newhart
- Released: 1960
- Genre: Stand-up comedy
- Length: 36:20
- Label: Warner Bros.

Bob Newhart chronology
The Button-Down Mind of Bob Newhart (1960)	The Button-Down Mind Strikes Back (1960)	Behind the Button-Down Mind of Bob Newhart (1961)

Professional ratings
Review scores
Source	Rating
AllMusic	4.5/5 stars
New Record Mirror	5/5

The Button-Down Mind Strikes Back is a 1960 stand-up comedy album by Bob Newhart. Released soon after Newhart's top-selling debut The Button-Down Mind of Bob Newhart, the sequel album reached No. 1 on the Billboard Monophonic Action Albums chart on January 9, 1961. The two albums would occupy the top two positions on the chart for almost 30 weeks. Propelled by the success of Newhart's first album, The Button-Down Mind Strikes Back had sold 150,000 advance copies at the time of its release.

The album's tracks were recorded at the hungry i in San Francisco and Freddie's in Minneapolis.

== Track listing ==
1. "Automation and a Private in Washington's Army" – 5:10
2. "The Grace L. Ferguson Airline (And Storm Door Co.)" – 9:30
3. "Bus Drivers School" – 6:13
4. "Retirement Party" – 8:08
5. "An Infinite Number of Monkeys" – 1:33
6. "Ledge Psychology" – 5:10

== Certifications ==
Region	Certification	Certified units/sales
United States (RIAA)	Gold	500,000^{^}
^{^} Shipments figures based on certification alone.
