= Hello, Dolly! (Louis Armstrong album) =

Studio album by Louis Armstrong and His All Stars
- Released: 1964
- Recorded: December 3, 1963; April 18, 1964
- Venue: New York City
- Genre: Jazz
- Label: Kapp

Singles from Hello, Dolly!
- 1. "Hello, Dolly!" Released: January 1964; 2. "I Still Get Jealous" Released: June 1964

Professional ratings
Review scores
Source	Rating
AllMusic	3.5/5 stars

Hello Dolly! is a jazz album by Louis Armstrong and His All Stars, which at the time included Joe Darensbourg, Billy Kyle, Big Chief Russell Moore, Arvell Shaw, Danny Barcelona and Trummy Young. The tracks were mostly recorded on December 3, 1963, and April 18, 1964, in New York City. It was released by Kapp Records in 1964 and became Armstrong's most commercially successful album, it topped the Billboard Top LPs chart, during a seventy-four-week stay on the chart.

== Track listing ==
- Louis Armstrong : Hello, Dolly! (Kapp Records – KS-3364, MCA (Jap) 8146, MCA-Coral (G) COPS1780, 42013, Coral (E) CPS73, Mode (F) MDINT9692, MCA MCA-538 [CD])

Side One
No.	Title	Writer(s)	Length
1.	"Hello, Dolly!"	Jerry Herman	2:27
2.	"It's Been a Long, Long Time"	Sammy Cahn, Jule Styne	2:22
3.	"A Lot of Livin' to Do"	Lee Adams, Charles Strouse	2:36
4.	"A Kiss to Build a Dream On"	Bert Kalmar, Harry Ruby, Oscar Hammerstein II	4:31
5.	"Someday"	Louis Armstrong	3:41
6.	"Hey, Look Me Over"	Carolyn Leigh, Cy Coleman	2:34

Side Two
No.	Title	Writer(s)	Length
1.	"I Still Get Jealous"	Sammy Cahn, Jule Styne	2:13
2.	"Moon River"	Johnny Mercer, Henry Mancini	2:59
3.	"Be My Life's Companion"	Bob Hilliard, Milton De Lugg	2:52
4.	"Blueberry Hill"	Al Lewis, Larry Stock, Vincent Rose	3:20
5.	"You Are Woman, I Am Man"	Bob Merrill, Jule Styne	2:17
6.	"Jeepers Creepers"	Johnny Mercer, Harry Warren	4:39

== Reception ==
Greg Adams gave the album 3½ out of 5 stars in Allmusic and said, "Armstrong had one of the most recognizable and personality-laden voices of the 20th century, and although he was past his prime at the time, "Hello, Dolly!" shows him at his '60s best."

Digby Fairweather included the album in the selected Armstrong discography in The Rough Guide to Jazz, saying that "Armstrong has established himself in 1964 with a new generation of fans."

== Charts ==
Chart (1964)	Peak position
US Billboard Top LPs	1

== See also ==
- List of Billboard 200 number-one albums of 1964
