= The Singing Nun (album) =

- Cover to the initial Belgian release, entitled Sœur Sourire (Smiling Sister), the Singing Nun's stage name in French-speaking markets

Studio album by The Singing Nun
- Released: August 1963
- Recorded: Early 1962
- Studio: Philips Studios, Brussels, Belgium
- Genre: Christian, folk
- Length: 31:59
- Language: Belgian French
- Label: Philips

The Singing Nun chronology
The Singing Nun (1963)	Her Joys, Her Songs (1964)

The Singing Nun is the debut studio album by Belgian musician and former religious sister Jeanne-Paule Marie Deckers, released by Philips Records in 1963. A surprise hit, the album topped the Billboard 200 and other charts internationally for several weeks and sold millions of copies, particularly on the strength of the single Dominique. The album was initially intended to be a give-away, recorded for local children who enjoyed music from the local nunnery, but Philips decided to try giving it a widespread release, resulting in a huge commercial and critical success, garnering sales certifications and award nominations.

== Reception ==
A brief review for retailers in Billboard recommended this album for French-language speakers and folk music fans. Editors at AllMusic rated this album 4 out of 5 stars, with critic Lindsay Planer writing that "the enormously infectious charm of the tunes" overcomes the novelty act status of Deckers and her "musical gifts are undeniable and phonetically so well written and conveyed that the language barrier becomes reduced to the point of irrelevance". In a review for a 2014 reissue, John Clarke of The Independent highlighted several tracks and wrote that "perhaps like a box of chocolates there’s a bit too much to take at one sitting".

At the 1964 Grammys, this album was nominated for Album of the Year and Best Religious Performance, "Dominique" was nominated for Record of the Year, and the artist was nominated for Best Female Vocalist.

== Track listing ==
All songs written by Soeur Sourire

1. "Dominique" – 2:58
2. "Sœur Adèle" – 4:29
3. "Fleur de cactus" – 1:51
4. "Complainte de Marie-Jacques" – 2:28
5. "Je voudrais" – 1:55
6. "Tous les chemins" – 2:41
7. "Plume de radis" – 2:00
8. "Mets ton joli jupon" – 1:28
9. "Résurrection" – 3:50
10. "Alleluia" – 2:53
11. "J'ai trouvé le seigneur" – 2:59
12. "Entre les étoiles" – 3:16

== Personnel ==
- The Singing Nun – guitar, vocals, sketches, liner notes
- Gordon Anderson – executive production
- P. Brenk – photography
- Kipa – photography
- Joseph F. Laredo – liner notes on 1998 Collectors' Choice Music reissue
- F. Strobel – front cover drawing

== Sales performance and chart history ==
Chart performance for The Singing Nun
Year	Chart	Peak
1963–1964	Billboard 200	1

Sales for this release were initially slow, but rapidly expanded in late 1963. By that time, The Singing Nun was selling 100,000 copies per week for a total of over 670,000 by mid-December and "Dominique" had sold over 600,000 copies by the end of November 1963. The album spent three months without charting, but after entering the Billboard 200 at 139 on November 9, then reaching 54 the following week, eighth place on November 23, and second the following week, the album began a 10-week stay at the top of the charts that was stopped by Meet the Beatles! the following February. As of 2018, it is one of only five non-English albums to top the Billboard 200 and the only one to do so for more than one week. It spent a total of 36 weeks on the chart.

The Singing Nun was the first artist to have the top-selling album and a single from that album be the top-selling single in America at the same time (Stevie Wonder's Recorded Live: The 12 Year Old Genius and "Fingertips, Part 2" had topped the charts the previous year, but not at the same time; this is the only other time an artist's album and a single from that album had been number 1.) The album was certified gold, with more than 500,000 sales at the turn of 1964 and as of 2006, this release had sold more than 2 million copies. It was nominated for the National Association of Recording Merchandisers Best Selling Album of 1963.

This was the second album by a female artist to top the Billboard charts, after Judy Garland's 1961 Judy at Carnegie Hall and as of 2012, it was one of only 11 albums by a female artist to spend 10 or more weeks at number one. No other woman would have both the top album and top single until Mariah Carey in 1990. This was also the first LP record to chart in Belgium, alongside an extended play release of these songs.

This album was pivotal for Philips Records' success in the American market along with the single "Hey Paula", and the label pushed out an English-language recording by Susan Stein with new lyrics from Noël Regney by December 1963 and the label also recorded a collection of Gregorian chants at the Dominican Sisters of Fischermont, the Singing Nun's convent.

== See also ==
- List of 1963 albums
- List of Billboard 200 number-one albums of 1963
- List of Billboard 200 number-one albums of 1964
