= Dominique (song) =

Single by Sœur Sourire

from the album The Singing Nun
- Language: French
- B-side: "Entre les étoiles"
- Released: October 1963
- Recorded: 1963
- Studio: Philips Studios, Brussels
- Genre: Folk
- Length: 2:53
- Label: Philips
- Songwriter: Jeanne-Paule Marie Deckers

Dominique is a 1963 French-language popular song, written and performed by Belgian singer Jeanne-Paule Marie Deckers, better known as "Sœur Sourire" ("Sister Smile") or "The Singing Nun". The song is about Saint Dominic, a Spanish-born religious priest and founder of the Order of Preachers, of which Deckers was a member. The English-version lyrics of the song were written by Noël Regney. In addition to French and English, Deckers recorded versions in Dutch, German, Hebrew, Japanese, Korean, and Portuguese. It was a top selling record in 11 countries in late 1963 and early 1964.

== Commercial performance ==
Dominique reached the Top 10 in 11 countries in late 1963 and early 1964, topping the chart in the United States, Canada, Australia and New Zealand. It reached the Top 5 in Norway, Denmark, Ireland and South Africa, with the song making it into the lower reaches of the Top 10 in the Netherlands, West Germany, and the United Kingdom. The song reached and stayed at No. 1 on Top 40 radio station WABC in New York City for the four weeks of 19 November through 10 December 1963. On WLS Chicago, the song was No. 1 for the three weeks 15–29 November 1963. On both the U.S. Billboard Hot 100 and "Easy Listening chart", Dominique was No. 1 for the four weeks 7–28 December.

The song won the Grammy Award for Best Gospel or Other Religious Recording (Musical) in 1964. It was also a nominee for Grammy Award for Record of the Year, and Sœur Sourire was a nominee for Best Female Vocal Performance. It was the second foreign language song to hit No. 1 on the Hot 100 in 1963, the first being "Sukiyaki" by Kyu Sakamoto. For the next ten years or so, although there were a number of hits with most of the vocals in a language other than English (e.g., The Sandpipers' "Guantanamera", René y René's "Lo Mucho Que Te Quiero", etc.), no other purely foreign language song reached the Billboard Hot 100's top 40 until the Spanish language hit "Eres tú (Touch The Wind)" in 1974.Dominique outsold Elvis Presley during its stay on the Billboard Hot 100; it was the second to last No. 1 hit before the British Invasion.

== The song ==
Dominique became a worldwide hit in 1963 and was the first, and only, Belgian number-one hit single in the American Billboard charts.

It is remembered chiefly for its refrain, which goes:

Domi-nique -nique -nique s'en allait tout simplement,
Routier, pauvre et chantant.
En tous chemins, en tous lieux,
Il ne parle que du Bon Dieu,
Il ne parle que du Bon Dieu.

A literal English translation is:

Domi-nic -nic -nic went about simply,
a poor singing traveller.
On every road, in every place,
he talks only of the Good Lord,
he talks only of the Good Lord.

The lyrics of the chorus of Regney's English-language translation are:

Domi-nique -nique -nique, o'er the land he plods along,
And sings a little song.
Never asking for reward,
He just talks about the Lord,
He just talks about the Lord.

== Charts ==
=== Weekly charts ===
Chart (1963–1964)	Peak position
Argentina Singles Chart	1
Australian Singles Chart	1
Brazil Singles Chart (IBOPE)	1
Brazil EP's Chart (IBOPE)	2
Canadian (CHUM Charts Top 20)	1
Danish Singles Chart	2
Dutch Singles Chart	6
German Singles Chart	7
Finland Singles Chart (Suomen virallinen lista)	23
Irish Singles Chart	3
Japanese Singles Chart	2
Mexican Singles Chart (AMPROFON)	1
New Zealand Hit Parade	1
Norwegian Singles Chart	2
South African Singles Chart	1
Swedish Singles Chart	12
Swiss Hitparade	4
Uruguay Singles Chart	2
UK Singles Chart	7
US Billboard Hot 100	1
Venezuela Singles Chart	1

=== Year-end charts ===
Chart (1963)	Rank
US Cash Box Top 100	100

Chart (1964)	Rank
South Africa (Springbok)	5
US Cash Box Top 100	11

=== All-time charts ===
Chart (1958–2018)	Position
US Billboard Hot 100	412

== Cover versions ==
- Sandler and Young revived the song in late 1966, a version that appeared on the Billboard easy listening chart. The performance was a medley including other religious-themed songs including "Deep River" and "Nobody Knows the Trouble I've Seen".

== In popular culture ==
- In American Horror Story: Asylum, the song is featured heavily in nearly all episodes as a constant musical motif. The nun in charge of Briarcliff Manor, Sister Jude, has it playing on a loop in the common room at all times.

== See also ==
- List of 1960s one-hit wonders in the United States
