= Frank Fontaine =

American comedian and singer (1920–1978)

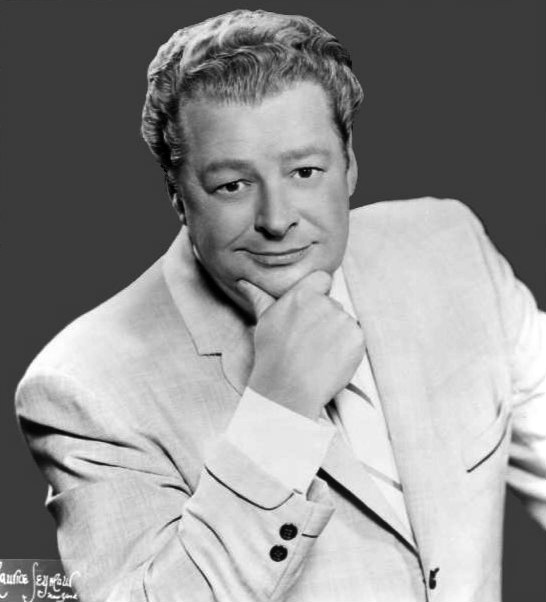
- Fontaine in 1971
- Born: April 19, 1920; Cambridge, Massachusetts, U.S.
- Died: August 4, 1978 (aged 58); Spokane, Washington, U.S.
- Occupations: Comedian; vocalist; actor
- Years active: 1940s–1975
- Spouse: Alma Clair Wakeham (m. 1937)
- Children: 11

Frank Fontaine (April 19, 1920 – August 4, 1978) was an American stage, radio, film and television comedian, singer, and actor.

== Early years and personal life ==
Born and raised in Cambridge, Massachusetts, Fontaine came from a family of entertainers. His father, Ray Fontaine, of French-Canadian descent, was a popular vocalist whose career in Canada resulted in his being compared to Bing Crosby. His mother, Anna McCarthy, of Irish and Scottish descent, performed as a dancer, and he had a brother who also became a singer. Fontaine left school and married Alma Clair Wakeham, his high school sweetheart, on April 17, 1937, at age sixteen, two days before his 17th birthday. Later, they moved to Medford.

Fontaine went right to work as an all‐purpose singer‐dancer‐comedian in Boston-area supper clubs. After the attack on Pearl Harbor (1941), he spent three years in the Army.

Known as a family man, Fontaine was devoted to his wife and children. He would rearrange his schedule so that he was never away from them for too long. In addition, he was well known for the size of his family, as Alma and he had two daughters and nine sons, born between 1939 and 1959.

== Career ==
Fontaine is best known for his appearances on television shows of the 1940s, 1950s and 1960s, including The Jack Benny Program, The Jackie Gleason Show, The Tonight Show, and The Ed Sullivan Show. "Sullivan first introduced me on a nationwide scale. This was back in 1948, when he inaugurated his Toast of the Town. He put me on his first three shows, as a comic and a guy who did imitations -- that's what I did mostly, back then -- and after every show he would say, 'Ladies and gentlemen, this fellow ought to be in pictures.' Well, first thing you know, I was out in Hollywood. I made 12 pictures, believe it or not."

Fontaine was featured on the radio version of The Jack Benny Program. During an episode which aired on April 9, 1950, Fontaine played a bum named "John L.C. Sivoney" who asked Benny for a dime for a cup of coffee. The smallest coin Benny had to offer was a fifty-cent piece, so he gave it to him. The story Benny told about this event became a running gag during later shows. Fontaine's goofball laugh and other vocal mannerisms made a hit with the audience, and Benny brought him back for several more radio shows between 1950 and 1952. He also later appeared on four of Jack Benny's television shows between 1951 and 1961.

In 1952, Fontaine starred in The Frank Fontaine Show, a weekly variety program on CBS radio. The program featured four other members of Fontaine's family in addition to singer Helen O'Connell and announcer Harry von Zell. He also was heard regularly on The Bob Hope Show on radio. On television he costarred with Patti Page on The Scott Music Hall (sponsored by the Scott Paper Company), which made its debut on October 8, 1952.

Fontaine was hired by TV producer Ben Frye to be the master of ceremonies of his new series Showtime (1955). Frye owned the Snader Telescriptions library of three-minute musicals filmed for television, and wanted to edit them into half-hour programs. Unlike Fontaine's usual comic characterization with floppy hat, baggy suit, and goofy voice, Fontaine appeared on Showtime in a standard business suit with no comic accessories or makeup. Fontaine's role was to stand in front of a theater curtain, offer a comic monologue, and then introduce each filmed performance as though the artists were taking the stage in person. The show went into first-run syndication in mid-1955; it made its debut on KTTV in Los Angeles on June 3, 1955.

In 1956 CBS hired Fontaine as the resident comic on the weekday-morning (7:00 a.m.) network show Good Morning, with host Will Rogers, Jr.

== Fame with Jackie Gleason ==
In 1962, comedian Jackie Gleason invited Fontaine to appear on Gleason's weekly American Scene Magazine series on CBS-TV. Fontaine recalled, "Just last year [1962] the phone call came from the executive producer of Jackie's new show. He said, 'Art Carney's going into a play and Jackie needs someone else to work with.' I said, 'I don't think I'd be much good. We look too much alike. I mean, two fat guys like us working together.' Finally, one night in Chicago, I got the call from Jackie and he said, 'Come on, pal, you're on the show. And I'm not gonna take no for an answer.' And that's how it all began." Fontaine used the same comic character familiar from the Jack Benny radio show, complete with bug-eyed grin, goofy voice, and silly laugh. The character was now named "Crazy Guggenheim" and appeared during Gleason's "Joe the Bartender" sketches. At the end of each conversation between Fontaine and Gleason, "Craze" would usually sing a sentimental song in Fontaine's natural voice, demonstrating a surprisingly strong baritone. "One day in my dressing room, I began to sing something and Jackie Gleason over in the next room called out: 'That's great, pal. You're gonna sing on the show next week!' And that's how that all started." Frank Fontaine became a fixture on the Gleason hour, and when Gleason moved the production from New York to Florida in 1964, Fontaine followed him. Fontaine made 88 American Scene Magazine appearances between 1962 and when the series ended in 1966.

== Legacy ==
Frank Fontaine's character voice was easily recognizable and inspired a host of imitations. Stan Freberg's voice characterization for Pete Puma, a would-be nemesis for Bugs Bunny in the 1952 cartoon short Rabbit's Kin, was based on Fontaine's character voice, along with Daws Butler's voice for Sam the Cat in the Sylvester cartoons Trick or Tweet in 1958 and Mouse and Garden in 1960. Actor Lennie Weinrib imitated the "Crazy Guggenheim" character on The Dick Van Dyke Show episode "The Sam Pomerantz Scandals" (1963). Muppet performer Jerry Nelson based the voice of one of his characters, Lew Zealand, off of Fontaine's "Crazy Guggenheim" voice.

Fontaine received mention in satirist Tom Lehrer's 1965 song "National Brotherhood Week", from the album That Was the Year That Was. In the live show, Lehrer mentioned National Make-Fun-of-the-Handicapped Week, "Which Frank Fontaine and Jerry Lewis are in charge of, as you know". He was credited in Bobby Rydell and Chubby Checker's song "Jingle Bells Imitations", which was the flip side of their "Jingle Bell Rock" record.

== Later life ==
Fontaine continued to reside in his home state of Massachusetts, and appeared in nightclubs and on television. During the late 1960s and into the 1970s, he toured children's hospitals to spread cheer among juvenile patients. Children had always enjoyed seeing Crazy on television, so Fontaine visited the bedridden children in full costume as Crazy. He found, to his dismay, that it was much more difficult to entertain youngsters in person. When he asked young patients to call him Crazy, the patients took him literally and were afraid to insult him. Their frightened reactions troubled Fontaine, who stopped using the "Crazy" name and now called himself "Happy Guggenheim".

== Death ==
In early August 1978, Fontaine was in Spokane, Washington, to perform at the Eagles International convention, headlining its Vaudeville Night with Arthur Godfrey and Corbett Monica at the Opera House on Friday, August 4, and was scheduled to lead the parade through the city the following afternoon as grand marshal. He had just completed a live stage benefit show, having accepted a check for $25,000 which he planned to donate for heart research, when he collapsed and died of a heart attack at age 58.

Fontaine's former residence in Winchester, a substantial house on Highland Avenue, is now the home of Winchester Community Music School.

== Filmography ==
Year	Title	Role	Notes
1950	Nancy Goes to Rio	Masher	
1950	Stella	Don	
1950	Hit Parade of 1951	John L.C. Sivoney	
1951	Call Me Mister	Sergeant	
1951	Here Comes the Groom	Crazy Guggenheim	Uncredited
1951	The Model and the Marriage Broker	Mr. Hjalmer Johannson	
1953	Scared Stiff	Drunk on Pier	Uncredited
1973	The Godmothers	Don Palermo	Final film role
