= Billboard 200 =

American weekly album chart

Billboard logo since 2013

The Billboard 200 is a record chart ranking the 200 most popular music albums and EPs in the United States. It is published weekly by Billboard magazine to convey the popularity of an artist or groups of artists. Sometimes, a recording act is remembered for its "number ones" that outperformed all other albums during at least one week. The chart grew from a weekly top 10 list in 1956 to become a top 200 list in May 1967, acquiring its existing name in March 1992. Its previous names include the Billboard Top LPs (1961–1972), Billboard Top LPs & Tape (1972–1984), Billboard Top 200 Albums (1984–1985), Billboard Top Pop Albums (1985–1991), and Billboard 200 Top Albums (1991–1992).

The chart is based mostly on sales—both at retail and digital–of albums in the United States. The weekly sales period was Monday to Sunday when Nielsen Soundscan started tracking sales in 1991. Still, since July 2015, the tracking week begins on Friday (to coincide with the Global Release Day of the music industry) and ends on Thursday. A new chart is published the following Tuesday, post dated to the Saturday of that week, four days later. The chart's streaming schedule is also tracked from Friday to Thursday. Digital downloads of albums are included in Billboard 200 tabulation. Albums that are not licensed for retail sale in the United States (yet purchased in the U.S. as imports) are not eligible to chart. A long-standing policy rendering titles that are sold exclusively by specific retail outlets (such as Walmart and Starbucks) ineligible for charting was reversed on November 7, 2007, and took effect in the issue dated November 17, 2007.

On December 13, 2014, Billboard began to include on-demand streaming and digital track sales (as measured by Nielsen SoundScan) using a new algorithm with data from all major on-demand audio subscription and online music sales services in the U.S. Starting on the issue dated January 18, 2020, Billboard updated its method again by incorporating video data from YouTube, along with visual plays from digital platforms like Apple Music, Spotify, Tidal, Vevo and, as of the issue dated March 23, 2021, from Facebook. YouTube removed their streaming data from Billboard's methodology in late 2025. YouTube's reasoning was a denied request to count ad-attached streams and YouTube Premium streams as equal for chart purposes.

As of the issue dated November 28, 2026, the number-one album on the chart is Golden Hour: Part.6 by Ateez.

== History ==
Billboard began an album chart in 1945. Initially, only five positions long, the album chart was not published on a weekly basis, with weeks sometimes passing before it was updated. A biweekly (though with a few gaps), 15-position Best-Selling Popular Albums chart appeared in 1955. With the increase in album sales as the early 1950s format wars stabilized into market dominance by 45 rpm singles and long-playing 12-inch albums – and with 78 rpm record and long-playing 10-inch album sales decreasing dramatically – Billboard premiered a weekly Best-Selling Popular Albums chart on March 24, 1956. The position count varied anywhere from 10 to 30 albums. The first number one album on the new weekly list was Belafonte by Harry Belafonte. The chart was renamed Best-Selling Pop Albums later in 1956, and then Best-Selling Pop LPs in 1957.

Beginning on May 25, 1959, Billboard split the ranking into two charts: Best-Selling Stereophonic LPs for stereo albums (30 positions) and Best-Selling Monophonic LPs for mono albums (50 positions). These were renamed Stereo Action Charts (30 positions) and Mono Action Charts (40 positions), respectively, in 1960. In January 1961, they became Action Albums – Stereophonic (15 positions) and Action Albums – Monophonic (25 positions), and three months later, they became Top LPs – Stereo (50 positions) and Top LPs – Monaural (150 positions).

On August 17, 1963, the stereo and mono charts were combined into a 150-position chart called Top LPs. On April 1, 1967, the chart was expanded to 175 positions, and then finally to 200 positions on May 13, 1967. In February 1972, the album chart's title was changed to Top LPs & Tape; in 1984, it was retitled Top 200 Albums; in 1985, it was retitled again to Top Pop Albums; in 1991, it became the Billboard 200 Top Albums; and it was given its current title of the Billboard 200 on March 14, 1992.

=== Catalog albums ===
In 1960, Billboard began concurrently publishing album charts that ranked sales of older or mid-priced titles. These Essential Inventory charts were divided by stereo and mono albums, and featured titles that had already appeared on the main stereo and mono album charts. Mono albums were moved to the Essential Inventory – Mono chart (25 positions) after spending 40 weeks on the Mono Action Chart, and stereo albums were moved to the Essential Inventory – Stereo chart (20 positions) after 20 weeks on the Stereo Action Chart.

In January 1961, the Action Charts became Action Albums – Stereophonic (15 positions) and Action Albums – Monophonic (24 positions). Albums appeared on either chart for up to nine weeks, and were then moved to an Essential Inventory list of approximately 200 titles, with no numerical ranking. This list continued to be published until the consolidated Top LPs chart debuted in 1963.

In 1982, Billboard began publishing a Midline Albums chart (alternatively titled Midline LPs), which ranked older or mid-priced titles. The chart held 50 positions and was published on a biweekly (and later triweekly) basis.

On May 25, 1991, Billboard premiered the Top Pop Catalog Albums chart, the criteria for which were albums that were more than 18 months old and had fallen below number 100 on the Billboard 200.

"Both Dark Side of the Moon and The Wall should be in the Billboard Top 200," said former Pink Floyd member Roger Waters in 1992. "The Wall still does anything up to four million each year... They've created a catalog chart in which to place all these old albums, leaving the main chart free for all the artists the record companies will want to book advertising space for. It just offers further evidence of the dishonesty that's rife in this business."

Following Michael Jackson's death on June 25, 2009, several of his albums saw a significant surge in sales. Number Ones, The Essential Michael Jackson, and Thriller occupied the top three spots for two consecutive weeks – a first in history. In the third week, six of Jackson's albums were the best-selling albums in the country. The success of catalog albums led to a change in Billboard's chart policies, and starting with the issue dated December 5, 2009, the catalog limitations for the Billboard 200 were lifted, allowing all albums to chart regardless of age or single activity (essentially changing Top Comprehensive Albums into the Billboard 200). A new chart that keeps the previous criteria for the Billboard 200 – dubbed the Top Current Albums chart – was also introduced in the same issue.

=== Christmas holiday albums ===
Billboard has adjusted its policies for Christmas and other adjacent holiday (Note: Billboard names "Hanukkah and Kwanza".) albums several times. The albums were eligible for the main album charts until 1963, when a Christmas Albums chart was created. Albums appearing here were not listed on the Top LPs chart, and in 1974, this rule was reversed, and holiday albums again appeared within the main list.

In 1983, the Christmas Hits chart with a top 10 albums list was resurrected, but a title's appearance here did not disqualify it from appearing on the Top Pop Albums chart. After no holiday charts were published in 1986, the Christmas Hits section resumed in 1987 as an albums-only chart with 30 positions that appeared every other week 2-3 times every Christmas season. In 1990, this chart was retitled Top Christmas Albums and in 2000, the title was changed to Top Holiday Albums; as of 2009, it holds 50 positions and runs for several weeks during the end-of-calendar-year holiday season. Its current policy allows holiday albums to concurrently chart on the Top Holiday Albums list and the Billboard 200.

=== Bubbling Under the Top LPs ===
From the end of 1970 to 1985, Billboard published a Bubbling Under the Top LPs (Note: LPs was spelled with an apostrophe, i.e. "LP's", until August 1974 at the same time it was dropped from the Top LPs & Tape chart.) weekly chart. A corollary to the Bubbling Under the Hot 100 singles chart, this chart listed albums that had not yet charted on the main Billboard 200 chart, then called Top LPs & Tape.

For thirteen months in 1956 and 1957, a five-position Pop Albums Coming Up Strong chart had appeared in Billboard. The immediate precursor, however, was an Action Albums list that appeared with the Bubbling Under the Hot 100 singles chart. The Bubbling Under the Top LPs first appeared, unannounced, in the 26 December 1970 issue of the magazine, as a successor to an Action Albums list. Like Action Albums, this list was unnumbered and fluctuated in size from around seven to ten entries. In the following month, the list increased to over 20 entries, and in the 13 March 1971 issue, a numbered chart (201 through 225) appeared. The chart continued to range from four to 35 entries, until settling at ten entries from 6 July 1974 on. Beginning with the issue of 20 October 1984, the chart was renamed Bubbling Under the Top 200 Albums to matching a title change of the main album chart. It was renamed again—Bubbling Under the Top Pop Albums—beginning in the 9 February 1985 issue once again reflecting a change of the main album chart's name. For the life of the chart, it was paired with Bubbling Under the Hot 100.

The chart ceased to exist after its final appearance in the 24 August 1985 issue, the same date that saw a discontinuation of the Bubbling Under Hot 100. While the Bubbling Under Hot 100 was revived in 1992, Billboard has never published another Bubbling Under albums chart.

=== Nielsen SoundScan ===
Since May 25, 1991, the Billboard 200's positions have been derived from Nielsen SoundScan sales data; as of 2008, it is contributed to by approximately 14,000 music sellers. Because these numbers are supplied by a subset of sellers rather than record labels, it is common for these numbers to be substantially lower than those reported by the Recording Industry Association of America when Gold, Platinum and Diamond album awards are announced. (RIAA awards reflect wholesale shipments, not retail sales.)

The first album to debut atop the Billboard 200 chart in the Nielsen SoundScan era was Skid Row's Slave to the Grind, released on June 11, 1991.

=== Incorporation of streaming data and track sales ===
Beginning with the December 13, 2014, issue, Billboard updated the methodology of its album chart again, changing from a "pure sales-based ranking" to one measuring "multi-metric consumption". With this overhaul, the Billboard 200 includes on-demand streaming and digital track sales (as measured by Nielsen SoundScan) by way of a new algorithm, utilizing data from all of the major on-demand audio subscription services, including Spotify, Apple Music, Google Play Music and Groove Music. Under the new methodology, 10 track sales or 1,500 song streams from an album are treated as equivalent to one purchase of the album. Billboard continues to publish a pure album sales chart, called Top Album Sales, that maintains the traditional Billboard 200 methodology but is based exclusively on SoundScan's sales data.

Beginning on January 18, 2020, Billboard incorporated video and audio data from YouTube, along with visual plays from streaming services like Apple Music, Spotify, Tidal, and Vevo, into the Billboard 200. The change has also impacted Billboard's genre-specific album charts. The incorporation of YouTube data was paused in early 2026 per YouTube's request due to a disagreement on how Billboard measures and weighs ad-supported and on-demand streams on the platform.

== Year-end charts ==
Billboard's "chart year" runs from the first week of December to the final week in November. This altered calendar allows for Billboard to calculate year-end charts and release them in time for its final print issue in the last week of December. Prior to Nielsen SoundScan, year-end charts were calculated by an inverse-point system based solely on an album's performance on the Billboard 200 (e.g., an album would be given one point for a week spent at No. 200, two points for a week spent at No. 199, etc., up to 200 points for each week spent at No. 1). Other factors, including an album's total weeks spent on the chart and its peak position, are calculated into an album's year-end total.

Since Billboard began obtaining sales information from Nielsen SoundScan, the year-end charts are now calculated by a very straightforward cumulative total of yearlong sales. This gives a more accurate picture of any given year's best-selling albums, as a title that hypothetically spent nine weeks at No. 1 in March could possibly have sold fewer copies than one spending six weeks at No. 3 in January. Albums at the peak of their popularity at the time of the November/December chart-year cutoff often end up ranked lower than one would expect on a year-end tally, yet are ranked on the following year's chart as well, as their cumulative points are split between the two chart-years.

== All-time Billboard 200 achievements (1963–2015) ==
In 2015, Billboard compiled a ranking of the 100 best-performing albums on the Billboard 200 over its 52 years, along with the best-performing artists. Shown below are the top 10 albums and top 10 artists over the 52 years of the Billboard 200, through October 2015. Also shown are the artists placing the most albums on the overall "all-time" top 100 album list.

=== Top 10 albums of all time (1963–2015) ===
| Rank | Album | Year released | Artist | Peak and duration |
|---|---|---|---|---|
| 1 | 21 | 2011 | Adele | No. 1 for 24 weeks |
| 2 | The Sound of Music | 1965 | Soundtrack | No. 1 for 2 weeks |
| 3 | Thriller | 1982 | Michael Jackson | No. 1 for 37 weeks |
| 4 | Fearless | 2008 | Taylor Swift | No. 1 for 11 weeks |
| 5 | Born in the U.S.A. | 1984 | Bruce Springsteen | No. 1 for 7 weeks |
| 6 | Ropin' the Wind | 1991 | Garth Brooks | No. 1 for 18 weeks |
| 7 | Jagged Little Pill | 1995 | Alanis Morissette | No. 1 for 12 weeks |
| 8 | Doctor Zhivago | 1966 | Maurice Jarre | No. 1 for 1 week |
| 9 | All the Right Reasons | 2005 | Nickelback | No. 1 for 1 week |
| 10 | Tapestry | 1971 | Carole King | No. 1 for 15 weeks |

=== Top 10 albums artists of all time (1963–2015) ===
| Rank | Artist |
|---|---|
| 1 | The Beatles |
| 2 | The Rolling Stones |
| 3 | Barbra Streisand |
| 4 | Garth Brooks |
| 5 | Elton John |
| 6 | Mariah Carey |
| 7 | Herb Alpert |
| 8 | Taylor Swift |
| 9 | Chicago |
| 10 | Michael Jackson |

=== Artists with the most albums on Billboard's top 200 albums of all time (1963–2015) ===
| Number of albums | Artist | Albums (ranking) |
|---|---|---|
| 5 | The Beatles | Sgt. Pepper's Lonely Hearts Club Band (54), A Hard Day's Night (105), 1 (131), Abbey Road (135), Meet the Beatles! (187) |
| 4 | Taylor Swift | Fearless (4), Taylor Swift (18), 1989 (64), Red (140) |
| 4 | Led Zeppelin | Led Zeppelin II (146), Houses of the Holy (185), Led Zeppelin IV (194), In Through the Out Door (198) |
| 3 | Michael Jackson | Thriller (3), Bad (138), Off the Wall (149) |
| 3 | Nickelback | All the Right Reasons (9), Silver Side Up (162), Dark Horse (182) |
| 3 | Whitney Houston | Whitney Houston (11), The Bodyguard (23), Whitney (159) |
| 3 | Herb Alpert | Whipped Cream & Other Delights (13), Going Places (44), What Now My Love (170) |
| 3 | Elton John | Goodbye Yellow Brick Road (39), Honky Château (145), Captain Fantastic and the Brown Dirt Cowboy (175) |
| 3 | Mariah Carey | Mariah Carey (50), The Emancipation of Mimi (52), Music Box (87) |
| 3 | Janet Jackson | Control (72), Janet Jackson's Rhythm Nation 1814 (94), Janet (119) |

== Artist milestones ==
=== Most number-one albums ===
| Albums | Artist | Ref. |
|---|---|---|
| 19 | The Beatles | |
| 15 | Drake | |
| 15 | Taylor Swift | |
| 14 | Jay-Z | |
| 12 | Future | |
| 11 | Barbra Streisand | |
| 11 | Bruce Springsteen | |
| 11 | Eminem | |
| 11 | Kanye West | |
| 10 | Elvis Presley | |
| 10 | Madonna | |

- As a musician, Paul McCartney has the most number-one albums, with 27. This includes 19 albums from his work with the Beatles, three solo albums and five albums as a part of his 1970s group Wings. John Lennon is in second place with 22, including 19 albums with the Beatles, two solo albums, and one album credited to him and his wife Yoko Ono. George Harrison had 19 number-one albums with the Beatles and two as a solo artist.
- Barbra Streisand is the only artist to have number-one albums in six different decades. Her first was the 1964 album People, and her most recent was the 2016 album Encore: Movie Partners Sing Broadway, with a few weeks shy of 52 years between the two hitting number one.

=== Most number-one albums in a calendar year ===
| Albums | Artist | Year | Ref. |
|---|---|---|---|
| 4 | The Monkees | 1967 | |
| 3 | Elvis Presley | 1957 | |
| 3 | The Kingston Trio | 1960 | |
| 3 | Elvis Presley | 1961 | |
| 3 | The Beatles | 1964 | |
| 3 | The Beatles | 1965 | |
| 3 | The Beatles | 1966 | |
| 3 | Herb Alpert & the Tijuana Brass | 1966 | |
| 3 | Elton John | 1975 | |
| 3 | Garth Brooks | 1998 | |
| 3 | Glee Cast | 2010 | |
| 3 | Taylor Swift | 2021 | |
| 3 | Taylor Swift | 2023 | |
| 3 | Future | 2024 | |

=== Most consecutive number-one studio albums ===
| Number | Act | Ref. |
|---|---|---|
| 15 | Taylor Swift | |
| 11 | Kanye West | |
| 11 | Eminem | |
| 10 | Jay-Z | |
| 9 | The Beatles | |
| 8 | Beyoncé | |
| 8 | The Rolling Stones | |
| 7 | Dave Matthews Band | |
| 7 | Drake | |
| 7 | Future | |

=== Most consecutive studio albums to debut at number one ===
| Number | Act | Ref. |
|---|---|---|
| 15 | Taylor Swift | |
| 11 | Jay-Z | |
| 11 | Kanye West | |
| 10 | Eminem | |
| 8 | Beyoncé | |
| 8 | Drake | |
| 7 | Dave Matthews Band | |
| 6 | Justin Bieber | |
| 6 | Metallica | |
| 6 | Lady Gaga | |

- On May 1, 2016, Beyoncé became the first artist to have their first six studio albums debut at number one on the Billboard 200 chart, following the release of her sixth studio album, Lemonade, surpassing DMX. Following the release of Renaissance and its debut atop the August 7, 2022, chart, she become the first and only female artist to debut her first seven albums atop the chart. Following the release of Cowboy Carter and its debut atop the April 13, 2024, chart, she extended her record to become the first and only female artist to debut her first eight albums atop the chart.
- On April 3, 2021, Justin Bieber became the first male act to have his first six studio albums debut at number one on the Billboard 200 chart, following the release of his sixth studio album, Justice.
- On September 6, 2025, Stray Kids became the first group act to debut at number one with their first seven entries on the chart, following the release of their fourth studio album Karma.

=== Most cumulative weeks at number one ===
List of acts with the most weeks at number one on the Billboard 200 since August 17, 1963.

| Weeks at number one | Artist | Ref. |
|---|---|---|
| 132 | The Beatles | |
| 101 | Taylor Swift | |
| 67 | Elvis Presley | |
| 52 | Garth Brooks | |
| 51 | Michael Jackson | |
| 46 | Whitney Houston | |
| 46 | The Kingston Trio | |
| 43 | Morgan Wallen | |
| 41 | Drake | |
| 40 | Adele | |
| 39 | Elton John | |

=== Most consecutive years at number one ===
List of acts that reached number one on the Billboard 200 with a new album in consecutive calendar years since August 17, 1963.

| Years | Act | Streak |
|---|---|---|
| 8 | Taylor Swift | 2019–2026 |
| 7 | The Beatles | 1964–1970 |
| 5 | Drake | 2015–2019 |
| 5 | Jay-Z | 2000–2004 |
| 5 | Paul McCartney | 1973–1977 |

=== Most top-10 albums ===
| Number | Artist | Ref. |
|---|---|---|
| 39 | The Rolling Stones | |
| 34 | Barbra Streisand | |
| 33 | Frank Sinatra | |
| 32 | The Beatles | |
| 27 | Elvis Presley | |
| 24 | Madonna | |
| 23 | Bob Dylan | |
| 22 | Elton John | |
| 22 | Paul McCartney/Wings | |
| 22 | Bruce Springsteen | |

=== Most albums in the top 10 simultaneously ===
- Prince (5) – 2016
- Taylor Swift (5) – 2023
- The Kingston Trio (4; 5 consecutive times) – 1959
- Herb Alpert & the Tijuana Brass (4) – 1966
- Peter, Paul and Mary (3) – 1963
- Whitney Houston (3) – 2012
- Led Zeppelin (3) – 2014
- Kendrick Lamar (3) – 2025
- Morgan Wallen (3; four times) — 2025
- Drake (3) – 2026

Note: Swift is the first living artist to chart five albums in the top 10 simultaneously. She was previously the first living soloist to have four albums simultaneously chart in the top 10 for 5 consecutive weeks.

Note: Had the Billboard 200 allowed catalog albums to chart prior to December 5, 2009, Michael Jackson would have claimed six simultaneous top 10 titles for two consecutive weeks and the Beatles would have claimed five simultaneous top 10 titles that year.

=== Most albums in the top 25 simultaneously ===
- Taylor Swift (8) – 3 times in 2023
- Bad Bunny (4) – 2026
- Drake (4) – 2026

=== Most albums in the top 100 simultaneously ===
- Mitch Miller (12) – 1961
- Taylor Swift (10) – 2023; 2024 (on 14 different weeks)
- Drake (10) – 2026
- Bad Bunny (7) – 2026
- Coldplay (6) – 2016

Note: Had the Billboard 200 allowed catalog albums to chart previous to December 5, 2009, Michael Jackson would have claimed 9 simultaneous top 100 titles for two consecutive weeks.

=== Most albums in the top 200 simultaneously ===
- Prince (19) – 2016
- The Beatles (13) – 2014
- Drake (12) – 2026
- Taylor Swift (11) – 2023 (on 5 different weeks); 2024 (on 20 different weeks); 2025
- Whitney Houston (10) – 2012
- David Bowie (10) – 2016
- Drake (10) – 2023
- Led Zeppelin (9) – 1979
- Eminem (8) – 2013
- Linkin Park (8) – 2017
- Ariana Grande (8) - 2025

=== Most albums spending at least 1 full year (52 weeks) in the top 10 ===
- Taylor Swift (4)

=== Most albums spending at least 100 weeks in the top 10 ===
- Morgan Wallen (2)
- SZA (1)

== Album milestones ==
=== Most weeks at number one ===
| Weeks | Album | Artist | Year(s) | Ref. |
|---|---|---|---|---|
| 54 | West Side Story† | Various artists | 1962–63 | |
| 37 | Thriller | Michael Jackson | 1983–84 | |
| 31 | Rumours | Fleetwood Mac | 1977–78 | |
| 31 | South Pacific‡ | Various artists | 1958–59 | |
| 31 | Calypso | Harry Belafonte | 1956–57 | |
| 24 | 21 | Adele | 2011–12 | |
| 24 | Purple Rain | Prince and the Revolution | 1984–85 | |
| 24 | Saturday Night Fever | Bee Gees/Various artists | 1978 | |
| 21 | Please Hammer Don't Hurt 'Em | MC Hammer | 1990 | |
| 20 | The Bodyguard | Whitney Houston/Various artists | 1992–93 | |
| 20 | Blue Hawaii § | Elvis Presley | 1961–62 | |

† The West Side Story soundtrack ran for 53 weeks at number one on the stereo album chart; it was number one for 12 weeks on the mono album chart.

‡ The South Pacific soundtrack ran for 28 weeks at number one on the stereo album chart; it was number one for three weeks on the mono album chart.

§ This is the Blue Hawaii album's run on the mono album chart; it was number one for four weeks on the stereo album chart.

- Tapestry by Carole King holds the record for the most consecutive weeks at number one on the Billboard 200 for any one album by a female solo artist with 15 weeks.

=== Most weeks spent in the top-ten ===
| Weeks | Album | Artist | Year(s) | Ref. |
|---|---|---|---|---|
| 173 | My Fair Lady | Original Cast (Various Artists) | 1956–1960 | |
| 165 | Dangerous: The Double Album | Morgan Wallen | 2021–2025 | |
| 153 | One Thing at a Time | Morgan Wallen | 2023–2026 | |
| 118 | SOS | SZA | 2022–2026 | |
| 109 | The Sound of Music Soundtrack | Soundtrack (Various Artists) | 1965–1967 | |
| 106 | West Side Story | Soundtrack (Various Artists) | 1962–1963 | |
| 105 | The Sound Of Music Original Cast | Original Cast (Various Artists) | 1960–1961 | |
| 94 | Thriller | Michael Jackson | 1983–2026 | |
| 90 | South Pacific | Soundtrack (Various Artists) | 1958–1959 | |
| 87 | Camelot | Original Cast (Various Artists) | 1961–1962 | |
| 87 | Oklahoma! | Soundtrack (Various Artists) | 1956–1957 | |

=== Most weeks on the chart ===
Note that totals are for the main albums chart only, catalog chart totals are not factored in.
(*) indicates that the album is currently charting.

| Weeks | Album | Artist | Ref. |
|---|---|---|---|
| 997* | The Dark Side of the Moon | Pink Floyd | |
| 965* | Legend | Bob Marley and the Wailers | |
| 935* | Greatest Hits | Journey | |
| 858* | Metallica | Metallica | |
| 824* | Chronicle: The 20 Greatest Hits | Creedence Clearwater Revival | |
| 814* | Curtain Call: The Hits | Eminem | |
| 806* | Doo-Wops & Hooligans | Bruno Mars | |
| 800* | Nevermind | Nirvana | |
| 799* | Greatest Hits | Guns N' Roses | |
| 744* | Thriller | Michael Jackson | |
| 733* | Good Kid, M.A.A.D City | Kendrick Lamar | |
| 725* | Greatest Hits | Queen | |
| 715* | Take Care | Drake | |
| 711* | Rumours | Fleetwood Mac | |
| 696* | Greatest Hits | Tom Petty and the Heartbreakers | |
| 666* | Born to Die | Lana Del Rey | |
| 650* | Greatest Hits | 2Pac | |
| 646 | Back in Black | AC/DC | |
| 641* | Greatest Hits | Bob Seger & The Silver Bullet Band | |
| 623* | 2014 Forest Hills Drive | J. Cole | |

=== Largest jumps to number one ===
1. (176 to 1) Life After Death – The Notorious B.I.G. (April 12, 1997)
2. (173 to 1) Vitalogy – Pearl Jam (December 24, 1994)
3. (157 to 1) Fearless (Taylor's Version) – Taylor Swift (October 16, 2021)
4. (156 to 1) In Rainbows – Radiohead (January 19, 2008)
5. (139 to 1) The Black Parade – My Chemical Romance (November 7, 2026)
6. (137 to 1) Ghetto D – Master P (September 20, 1997)
7. (122 to 1) More of The Monkees – The Monkees (February 11, 1967)
8. (120 to 1) Call Me If You Get Lost – Tyler, the Creator (April 30, 2022)
9. (112 to 1) MP da Last Don – Master P (June 20, 1998)
10. (106 to 1) Days Before Rodeo – Travis Scott (September 28, 2024)

=== Largest drops from number one ===
1. (1 to 169) This House Is Not for Sale – Bon Jovi (March 17, 2018)
2. (1 to 157) Bass Persuades – Miley Cyrus (October 10, 2026)
3. (1 to 139) Call Me If You Get Lost – Tyler, the Creator (May 7, 2022)
4. (1 to 111) Courage – Celine Dion (December 7, 2019)
5. (1 to 97) Science Fiction – Brand New (September 16, 2017)
6. (1 to 88) Iridescence – Brockhampton (October 13, 2018)
7. (1 to 77) Madame X – Madonna (July 6, 2019)
8. (1 to 70) Lyfestyle – Yeat (November 9, 2024)
9. (1 to 62) Boarding House Reach – Jack White (April 14, 2018)
10. (1 to 59) Wonderful Wonderful – The Killers (October 21, 2017)

Notes:

- The album Music to Be Murdered By by Eminem has the largest rise for an album that did not result in a number 1 jump; on January 2, 2021, it rose from number 199 the previous week to number 3 on the chart.
- The mixtape Days Before Rodeo by Travis Scott dropped off the chart entirely after reaching number 1 the previous week (October 5, 2024), becoming the first project to do so.
- The largest drop by an album that never topped the chart is Hello from Las Vegas by Lionel Richie, debuting at number 2 on August 31, 2019, and falling off the chart the following week.

=== Longest climbs to number one in the SoundScan era ===
Here are the albums to complete the 10 longest rises to number one on the Billboard 200 since the adoption of Nielsen Music data in 1991.

| Weeks to No. 1 | Artist | Album | Date reached No. 1 |
|---|---|---|---|
| 63 | Various Artists | O Brother, Where Art Thou? Soundtrack | March 23, 2002 |
| 53 | The Kid Laroi | F*ck Love | August 7, 2021 |
| 52 | Live | Throwing Copper | May 6, 1995 |
| 49 | No Doubt | Tragic Kingdom | December 21, 1996 |
| 46 | Norah Jones | Come Away with Me | January 25, 2003 |
| 44 | Hootie & the Blowfish | Cracked Rear View | May 27, 1995 |
| 40 | Prince | The Very Best of Prince | May 7, 2016 |
| 31 | Toni Braxton | Toni Braxton | February 26, 1994 |
| 28 | Celine Dion | Falling into You | October 5, 1996 |
| 27 | Eric Clapton | Unplugged | March 13, 1993 |

- Forever Your Girl by Paula Abdul spent 64 consecutive weeks on the Billboard 200 before hitting number one in 1989, making it the longest time spent on the chart before reaching the number one spot.

=== Albums to top the Billboard 200 by artists who have never appeared on the Hot 100 ===
| Artist | Album | Year | Ref. |
|---|---|---|---|
| Van Cliburn | Tchaikovsky: Piano Concerto No. 1 | 1958 | |
| Bob Newhart | The Button-Down Mind of Bob Newhart | 1960 | |
| Bob Newhart | The Button-Down Mind Strikes Back! | 1961 | |
| Judy Garland | Judy at Carnegie Hall | 1961 | |
| Vaughn Meader | The First Family | 1962 | |
| Frank Fontaine | Songs I Sing on the Jackie Gleason Show | 1963 | |
| Blind Faith | Blind Faith | 1969 | |
| Pantera | Far Beyond Driven | 1994 | |
| Bob Carlisle | Butterfly Kisses (Shades of Grace) | 1997 | |
| Marilyn Manson | Mechanical Animals | 1998 | |
| Marilyn Manson | The Golden Age of Grotesque | 2003 | |
| Il Divo | Ancora | 2006 | |
| Slipknot | All Hope Is Gone | 2008 | |
| Vampire Weekend | Contra | 2010 | |
| The Decemberists | The King Is Dead | 2011 | |
| Amos Lee | Mission Bell | 2011 | |
| TobyMac | Eye on It | 2012 | |
| Vampire Weekend | Modern Vampires of the City | 2013 | |
| Lecrae | Anomaly | 2014 | |
| Slipknot | .5: The Gray Chapter | 2014 | |
| Brand New | Science Fiction | 2017 | |
| LCD Soundsystem | American Dream | 2017 | |
| Vampire Weekend | Father of the Bride | 2019 | |
| Slipknot | We Are Not Your Kind | 2019 | |
| SuperM | SuperM – The 1st Mini Album | 2019 | |
| Tomorrow X Together | The Name Chapter: Temptation | 2023 | |
| Enhypen | The Sin: Bliss | 2026 | |

Note: Newhart, Meader, and Fontaine's albums were all number one on the mono chart but not on the stereo chart. Garland is listed on a technicality; she has 17 pop hits, but all were from 1939 to 1955 – all before the 1958 establishment of the Hot 100.

=== EPs to reach number one on the Billboard 200 ===
| Artist(s) | EP | Year | Ref. |
|---|---|---|---|
| Alice In Chains | Jar of Flies | 1994 | |
| Jay-Z and Linkin Park | Collision Course | 2004 | |
| Glee Cast | Glee: The Music, The Power Of Madonna | 2010 | |
| Glee Cast | Glee: The Music, Journey to Regionals | 2010 | |
| Bad Meets Evil | Hell: The Sequel | 2011 | |
| The Weeknd | My Dear Melancholy | 2018 | |
| BTS | Map of the Soul: Persona | 2019 | |
| SuperM | SuperM — The 1st Mini Album | 2019 | |
| Stray Kids | Oddinary | 2022 | |
| Stray Kids | Maxident | 2022 | |
| Tomorrow X Together | The Name Chapter: Temptation | 2023 | |
| NewJeans | Get Up | 2023 | |
| Stray Kids | Rock-Star | 2023 | |
| Twice | With You-th | 2024 | |
| Stray Kids | Ate | 2024 | |
| Ateez | Golden Hour: Part.2 | 2024 | |
| Ateez | Golden Hour: Part.5 | 2026 | |
| Stray Kids | This & That | 2026 | |
| Katseye | Wild | 2026 | |

=== All-Spanish-language albums to reach number one on Billboard 200 ===
| Artist(s) | Album | Peak date | No. weeks | Ref. |
|---|---|---|---|---|
| Bad Bunny | El Último Tour del Mundo | December 3, 2020 | 1 | |
| Bad Bunny | Un Verano Sin Ti | May 22, 2022 | 13 | |
| Karol G | Mañana Será Bonito | March 11, 2023 | 1 | |
| Bad Bunny | Nadie Sabe Lo Que Va a Pasar Mañana | October 28, 2023 | 1 | |
| Bad Bunny | Debí Tirar Más Fotos | January 25, 2025 | 3 | |
| Bad Bunny | Debí Tirar Más Fotos | May 17, 2025 | 1 | |
| Bad Bunny | Debí Tirar Más Fotos | February 28, 2026 | 1 | |

== Additional milestones ==
- The first album to debut at number one was Captain Fantastic and the Brown Dirt Cowboy by Elton John. John repeated the same feat with the album Rock of the Westies – the second album to debut at number one – making John the first artist to have two consecutive studio albums debut at number one. Whitney Houston's second album, Whitney, was the first album by a female artist to debut at number one.
- In the early 1960s, Bob Newhart accomplished the feat of having the number one and number two albums simultaneously on the Billboard albums chart, with The Button-Down Mind of Bob Newhart and The Button-Down Mind Strikes Back! This was equaled by the Beatles multiple times: twice in 1964 with Meet the Beatles! and Introducing... The Beatles, and then with A Hard Day's Night and Something New, followed in 1969 by the album The Beatles (commonly known as The White Album) and the soundtrack for the film Yellow Submarine. In 1991, Guns N' Roses held the top two with Use Your Illusion I and Use Your Illusion II; in 2004, Nelly's Suit and Sweat; and in 2017, Future's Future and Hndrxx.
- The Sound of Music set the record of 109 non-consecutive weeks in the top 10 from May 1, 1965, to July 16, 1966, but only spent two weeks at number one on the Billboard 200.
- The first U.K. solo artist to debut at number one with a debut album is Leona Lewis on April 26, 2008, with the album Spirit. The first U.K. group to debut at No. 1 with a debut album is One Direction on March 31, 2012, with the album Up All Night.
- Justin Bieber became the first artist in history to have five albums top the Billboard 200 at the age of 18, as Believe Acoustic debuted at number one on February 16, 2013. He also became the youngest solo artist to achieve this feat. Subsequently, Bieber (25 years, 360 days) became the youngest solo artist to achieve seven No. 1 albums on the chart with Changes, breaking a 59-year-old record set by Elvis Presley at the age of 26. He further extended his record, after turning 27, by becoming the youngest soloist to have eight albums top the Billboard 200, following the release of his sixth studio album, Justice, breaking yet another chart record held by Elvis Presley at the age of 29.
- Tony Bennett became the oldest male to debut at number one on October 8, 2011 (85 years, 66 days old), with the album Duets II. Bennett, who was born on August 3, 1926, later surpassed his own record when his collaborative album with Lady Gaga, Cheek to Cheek, debuted at number one on October 11, 2014 (88 years, 69 days old).
- The issue dated July 11, 2009, was the first time any catalog album outsold the number one album on the Billboard 200. Three of Michael Jackson's albums – Number Ones, The Essential Michael Jackson and Thriller – claimed positions 1–3, respectively, on "Top Pop Catalog Albums" and "Top Comprehensive Albums" in the week following Jackson's death.
- In 2012, Adam Lambert became the first openly gay musician to debut at number one with his album Trespassing.
- There have been 41 albums released on an independent label to reach number one on the Billboard 200.
- Jackie Gleason, at least for a time, held the record for the most albums to top the Billboard 200 without charting any songs in the top 40 of the Hot 100; five of Gleason's mood music albums topped the Billboard 200 in the mid-1950s.
- One Direction became the first group to debut at number one with its first three albums when Midnight Memories debuted atop the Billboard 200 chart dated December 14, 2013. It later became the first group to debut at number one with its first four albums when Four debuted atop the chart on November 26, 2014.
- Led Zeppelin holds the record for the longest gap between an album returning to the Top 10. Led Zeppelin first hit the Top 10 on the Billboard "Top LP's" chart for the week ending May 17, 1969, and returned 45 years and 35 days later at number 7 on the Billboard 200, for the week ending June 21, 2014.
- On November 29, 2015, 25 by Adele became the first album to sell 1 million copies in different weeks, with 1.11 million sold in its second week and 1.16 million sold in its fifth week on the chart.
- On May 22, 2016, Coloring Book by Chance the Rapper became the first streaming-only album to chart on the Billboard 200, debuting at number 8, with the album being streamed 57.3 million times in its first week, which was equivalent to 38,000 units sold.
- In 2016, Beyoncé and Solange Knowles became the first pair of female siblings to each have a No. 1 solo album on the Billboard 200, with Beyoncé's Lemonade and Solange's A Seat at the Table both reaching the top of the chart.
- On March 18, 2017, Future made history by achieving back-to-back number-one album debuts in successive weeks with Future and Hndrxx for the first time in the chart's history.
- On June 2, 2018, BTS became the first Korean artist to reach number one with its album Love Yourself: Tear.
- On January 19, 2019, A Boogie wit da Hoodie's Hoodie SZN became the album with the lowest weekly sales figure for a number-one album, with 1,000 sales. It subsequently did not sell enough to enter the sales-only "Top 100 Album Sales" chart. A week later, the album broke its own record when it stayed at number one for a second week, selling 749 copies.
- In 2017, Taylor Swift became the first artist to debut at the top of the chart with four albums that sold over one million copies within a week, accomplishing the feat with Speak Now, Red, 1989 and Reputation. She extended the record to five with Midnights in 2022, six with 1989 (Taylor's Version) in 2023, seven with The Tortured Poets Department in 2024, and eight with The Life of a Showgirl.
- Swift charted 10 of her albums on May 6, 2023, breaking a number of records, including the first living act to chart eight albums in the top 40 simultaneously, the first act to chart 9 albums in the top 50 simultaneously, and the first living act to chart ten albums in the top 100 simultaneously. She is also the first act to chart 10 albums simultaneously for four separate times, and the first living soloist to place four albums in the top 10.
- In July 2023, Swift became the first artist since Luminate tracking began in 1991 to have nine albums sell over 500,000 copies in pure sales in a single week. In November 2023, Swift extended the record to ten. In April 2024, she extended it yet again to eleven.
- In September 2023, Swift became the first artist to have five albums sell more than 1 million units in a calendar year with Midnights (3.810M), Lover (1.350M), Speak Now (Taylor's Version) (1.260M), Folklore (1.190M) and 1989 (1M). In November 2023, she extended the record to six albums with 1989 (Taylor's Version). In April 2024, she extended this to seven albums with The Tortured Poets Department. In October 2025, she extended it to eight albums with The Life of a Showgirl.
- In October 2023, Swift also became the first artist to have 11 albums charting for at least 100 weeks each after Red (Taylor's Version) achieved the mark.
- On October 23, 2023, Swift became the first artist to have four albums charting for at least 52 weeks (1 full year) in the top 10 of the chart with Fearless, 1989, Lover, and Midnights - the latter two doing so consecutively. Midnights is the first album released in the 2020s to achieve the mark.
- On November 4, 2023, the Rolling Stones became the first act with newly charted top 10 albums in seven different decades (1960s to 2020s), when the band's new studio album Hackney Diamonds debuted at number 3.
- The Grateful Dead hold the record for the most Top 40 albums on the Billboard 200, with 60 having charted at number 40 or higher. This is notably due to fan-exclusive unearthed live concert recordings, which are released a handful of times every year. Baton Rouge rapper NBA Youngboy became the runner-up in early 2026, amassing 35 entries with his project Slime Cry. He has more than any other rapper.
- Stevie Wonder's Songs in the Key of Life (first 13 weeks at number one), Whitney Houston's Whitney (first 11 weeks), Morgan Wallen's Dangerous: The Double Album (first 10 weeks), Wallen's One Thing at a Time (first 12 weeks), and Taylor Swift's The Tortured Poets Department (first 12 weeks) are the only five albums in Billboard 200 history to spend at least their first ten weeks at number one.
- In October 2026, Swift became the first artist to spend at least 15 weeks at number one on the Billboard 200 with multiple albums—The Tortured Poets Department (17 weeks) and The Life of a Showgirl (15 weeks).

== See also ==
- Lists of Billboard 200 number-one albums
- List of highest-certified music artists in the United States

== Sources ==
- Whitburn, Joel (1991). The Billboard Book of Top 40 Albums (Revised and enlarged 2nd ed.). Billboard Books. ISBN 0-8230-7534-6.
- Whitburn, Joel (2006). The Billboard Albums (6th ed.). Record Research Incorporated. ISBN 0-89820-166-7.
- Additional information obtained can be verified within Billboard's online archive services and print editions of the magazine.
