= The Singing Nun =

Former Belgian religious sister and singer (1933–1985)

Jeanne Deckers
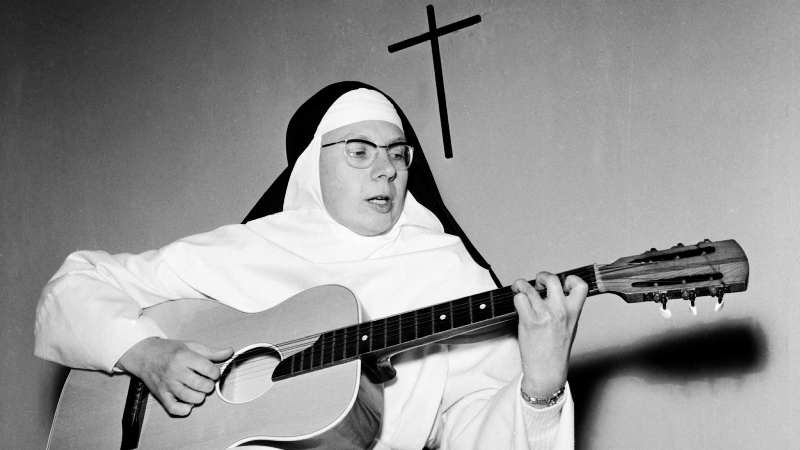
- Jeanne Deckers in the 1960s

Background information
- Also known as: The Singing Nun; Sœur Sourire; Sr. Luc Gabriel, O.P.; Luc Dominique
- Born: Jeanne-Paule Marie Deckers; 17 October 1933; Laeken, Brussels, Belgium
- Died: 29 March 1985 (aged 51) Wavre, Brabant, Belgium
- Genres: Folk, religious
- Instruments: Vocals, acoustic guitar
- Label: Philips Records

Jeanne-Paule Marie Deckers (religious name Luc Gabriel; 17 October 1933 – 29 March 1985), better known as Sœur Sourire (French for 'Sister Smile') or "The Singing Nun" in English-speaking countries, was a Belgian singer-songwriter and former member of a community of the Third Order of Saint Dominic. In 1963, she acquired widespread fame with the release of the Belgian French song Dominique, which topped the U.S. Billboard Hot 100 and other charts, along with her debut album.

Owing partially to confusion over the terms of the recording contract, she was eventually reduced to poverty. Deckers also experienced a crisis of faith, leaving the order, though she still remained a Catholic. She died by suicide in 1985 with her life partner, Annie Pécher.

== Early years ==
Jeanne-Paule Marie Deckers was born in Laeken, Brussels, Belgium, on 17 October 1933. The daughter of a pâtisserie owner, she was educated in a Catholic school in Brussels. Her mother thought of her as a "tomboy" and was pleased when she decided to join the all-girl Guides Catholiques de Belgique (GCB). When she was fifteen she had a premonition that she would become a nun.

She became an avid Girl Guide who bought her first guitar to play at Guide evening events. While studying for three years after high school, to obtain a diploma for teaching sculpture, she considered dedicating her life to religion in a Catholic convent. From the age of 21, between 1954 and 1959, she taught sculpture to youngsters. At scout camp in the summer of 1959 she met sixteen-year-old Annie Pécher, with whom she would develop a close relationship. She became convinced, however, that her new teaching profession did not suit her and she resigned.

In September 1959 she entered the Missionary Dominican Sisters of Our Lady of Fichermont, headquartered in the city of Waterloo, where she took the religious name Luc Gabriel.

== Career ==
While in the convent, Deckers wrote, sang, and casually performed her own songs. Her songs were so well received by her fellow sisters and visitors that her religious superiors encouraged her to record an album, which visitors and retreatants at the convent could purchase.

In 1962, the album was recorded in Brussels at Philips; in 1963 the single Dominique became an international hit, and her album sold nearly two million copies. Deckers became an international celebrity and took the stage name of Sœur Sourire ("Sister Smile"). She gave several live concerts and appeared on The Ed Sullivan Show on U.S. television on 5 January 1964. "Dominique" was the first song by a Belgian artist to be a number one hit single in the United States. The song's chorus "Dominique, nique, nique" caused some amusement among French listeners as the verb niquer is slang for 'have sex', with nique thus being equivalent to 'fuck(s)'; Deckers was unaware of this.

Deckers found it difficult, however, having to live up to her publicity as "a true girl scout", always happy and in a good mood: "I was never allowed to be depressed," she remembered in 1979. "The mother superior used to censor my songs and take out any verses I wrote when I was feeling sad."

In 1963 the General Music Company published a book of 15 Soeur Sourire songs with English lyrics provided by Noël Regney, who later claimed that he had co-written "Dominique." Later that same year she was sent by her order to take theology courses at the University of Louvain. She liked the student life, if not her courses.

=== Effects of fame and further musical career ===
Partially due to her ignorance of business matters, Deckers did not receive much money from the sales of her recordings. Most of her earnings were taken by Philips and her producer, while the rest automatically went to her religious congregation, which earned at least $100,000 in royalties. Her second album, titled Her Joys, Her Songs received scant attention upon its release and was quickly deleted by Philips.

In 1967, a biographical film loosely based on her story, The Singing Nun, was released by Metro-Goldwyn-Mayer and starred Debbie Reynolds in the title role. Sister Luc Gabriel reportedly rejected the film as "fiction".

Pulled between two worlds and increasingly in disagreement with the Catholic Church, Deckers left her convent in 1967 to pursue a life as a Tertiary living in the world instead. She later reported that her departure resulted from a personality clash with her superiors, that she had been forced out of the convent and did not leave of her own free will. Convent superiors denied the other sisters contact with her as she was described as a "bad influence". After she left, however, Deckers continued to adhere as closely as she could to the disciplines of the convent, still considering herself a nun, praying several times daily, and maintaining a simple and chaste lifestyle.

When she left the convent, her record company made her give up her professional names, "Sœur Sourire" and "The Singing Nun". She attempted to continue her musical career under the name Luc Dominique. Angered by what she saw as the Catholic Church's failure to implement the reforms of the Second Vatican Council, she released a song in 1967 in support of contraception, Glory be to God for the Golden Pill. This led to a backlash from the Catholic hierarchy which saw a succession of her planned concerts cancelled. In 1968, Deckers turned to publishing, writing a book of inspirational verse, but that, too, failed to gain an audience.

Deckers went on to release an album titled I Am Not a Star in Heaven and developed a repertoire of religious songs and songs for children. Despite her renewed emphasis on music, Deckers's career failed to prosper. She blamed the album's failure on not being able to use the names by which she had become known, saying that "nobody knew who it was". When a second single, "Sister Smile Is Dead", also failed, Deckers turned to teaching disabled youngsters in Wavre, Brabant, eventually opening her own school for autistic children. Deckers eventually suffered a nervous breakdown, which was followed by two years of psychotherapy.

== Later years ==
In 1973, Deckers became involved with the Catholic Charismatic Renewal. Cardinal Leo Joseph Suenens requested that she write songs for the movement, and this led to a brief but successful return to the stage, including a visit to Pittsburgh, Pennsylvania, where she sang before several thousand people. Under the name "Sister Smile", she released another album in 1979, which she described as containing "honest, religious songs" commenting that the album would help listeners to "know who I really am."

In the late 1967, the Ministry of Finance of Belgium said that she owed $63,000 in back taxes. Deckers countered that the royalties from her recording were given to her convent and therefore she was not liable for payment of any personal income tax. She then called on her former convent and her former record label, Philips. The sisters gave her what they considered to be her share (which enabled her to acquire an apartment in Wavre) on condition that she stop denigrating the congregation and sign a document stating that all accounts were balanced, but Philips, which had received 95% of the revenue, did nothing.

Deckers ran into heavy financial problems. In 1982, she tried, once again as Sœur Sourire, to score a hit with a disco synthesizer version of "Dominique", but this last attempt to resume her singing career failed. In addition to the other financial worries, the autism centre for children started by Deckers and Pécher had to close its doors for financial reasons in 1982. After this, Deckers tried to make a living by giving lessons in music and religion.

== Personal life and death ==
Deckers reconnected with Annie Pécher, whom she had known while at the University of Leuven. They developed a strong relationship, and shared an apartment until their deaths.

Frustrated by rumours that the relationship was sexual, Deckers wrote:

People at my record company think that two women who live together must be lesbians. They assert even that nuns in convents are in love. I deny these rumors as I testify against every creepy spirit. The answer is still obvious that I am not homosexual. I am loyal and faithful to Annie, but that is a whole other love in the Lord. Anyone who cannot understand this can go to the devil!

Biographer Catherine Sauvat asserts that despite this denial, Deckers did go on subsequently to have a sexual relationship with Pécher, though only after several years of life together.

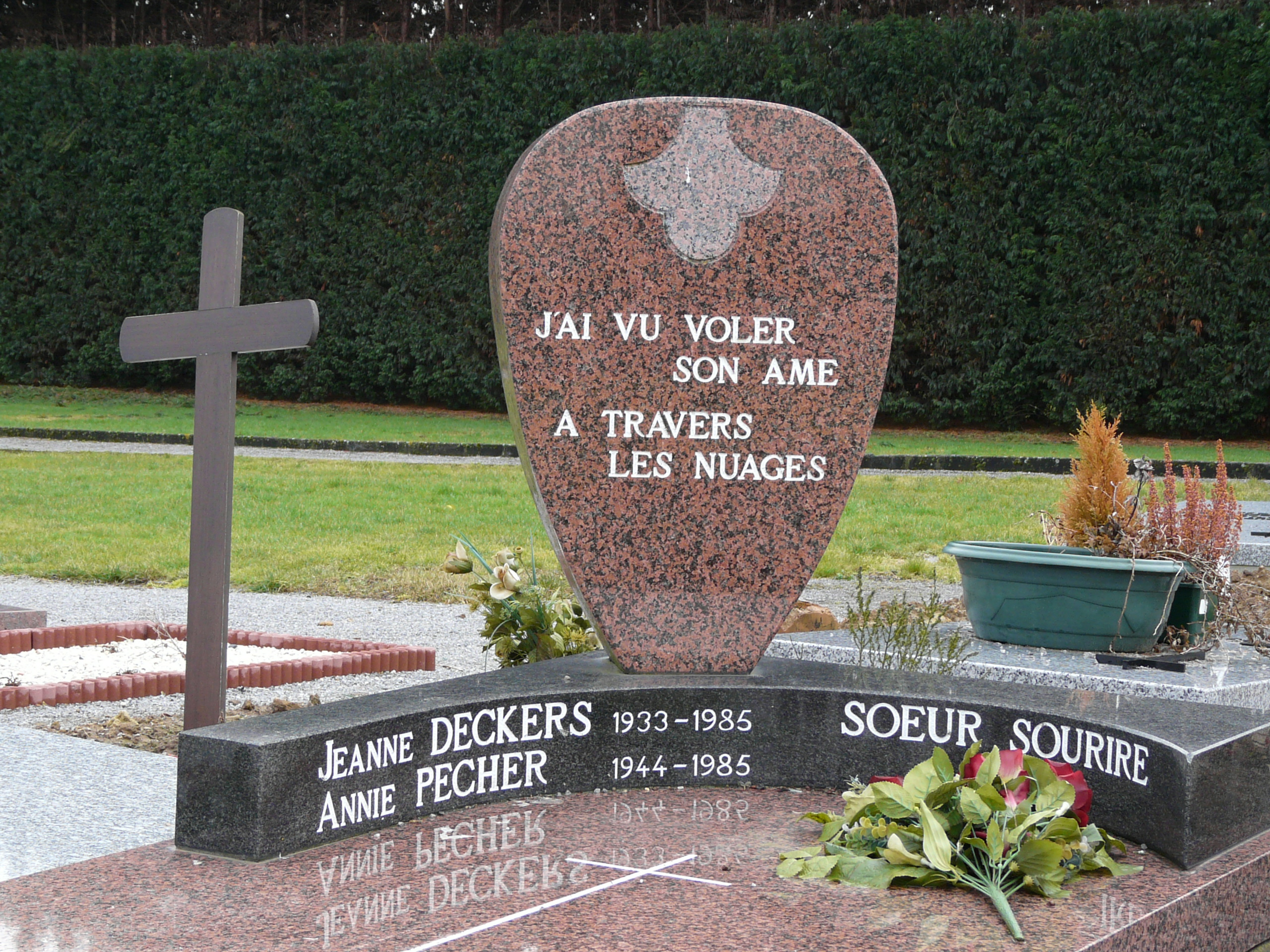
The grave of Deckers and Pécher at Chérémont Cemetery in Wavre, Brabant, Belgium

Deckers and Pécher died by suicide, taking overdoses of barbiturates and alcohol on 29 March 1985. In their suicide note, they referenced their financial problems. They also wrote that they had not lost their faith and wanted a joint burial, according to the rites of the Catholic Church. They were buried together on 4 April 1985 in Chérémont Cemetery in Wavre, Brabant, the town where they died. The inscription on their tombstone reads, "J'ai vu voler son âme / À travers les nuages" (English: "I saw her soul fly through the clouds"), a line taken from her 1966 song "Luc Dominique".

== In popular culture ==
=== Books ===
Soeur Sourire. Zie me graag (Sister Smile. Love me) is a 2005 biographical novel by Luc Maddelein and Leen van den Berg, inspired by Deckers' personal diaries and correspondence. It contains excerpts from the diaries. It was translated into French as Soeur Sourire. Journal d'une tragédie. (Sister Smile. Diary of a Tragedy).

=== Theatre ===
In 1996 The Tragic and Horrible Life of the Singing Nun premiered Off-Broadway at the Grove Street Playhouse. The play, which was written and directed by Blair Fell, was loosely based on events in Deckers' life. The production featured several musical numbers and followed the life of the title character, renamed Jeanine Fou, from her entry into the convent until her death with Pécher. The New York Times review stated the play "milks much of its comic mileage from the incongruous, and willfully tasteless, pairing of its holy setting and its trashy, Jacqueline Susann-style dialogue ... In dressing up despair in barbed frivolity, Mr. Fell provides his own skewed equivalent of tragic catharsis." The Catholic League spoke out publicly against the production.

In 2006 a musical version of Fell's play was staged during the New York Musical Theatre Festival, produced by George DeMarco and David Gerard, both of whom produced the 1996 production. Laura Daniel played Jeanine and received the NYMF Award for Outstanding Individual Performance. The musical featured music and lyrics by Andy Monroe and a book by Fell (who also contributed additional lyrics); it was directed by Michael Schiralli.

=== Films ===
The Singing Nun is a 1966 American semi-biographical film, directed by Henry Koster and with a screenplay by John Furia and Sally Benson. Based loosely on Deckers's life to that point in time, it stars Debbie Reynolds in the title role and also features Greer Garson, Ricardo Montalbán, Agnes Moorehead, Katharine Ross, Chad Everett, and Ed Sullivan as himself.

In 2009 Sister Smile, a Franco-Belgian biopic, directed by Stijn Coninx and starring Belgian actress Cécile de France as Deckers, was released. The film won the Magritte Award for Best Costume Design.

Her song Dominique was featured heavily in the second season of the show American Horror Story.

== Discography ==
=== Albums ===
- The Singing Nun (1963, Philips PCC 203)
- Her Joys, Her Songs (1964, Philips, PCC 209)
- I Am Not a Star in Heaven
- Chansons d'enfants (2014)

Compilations

- Best of Sœur Sourire (2003)
- Sœur Sourire, Volumes 1, 2 and 3 (2009)
- Sœur Sourire Sings – The Masterpieces (2021)
