= The Guess Who discography =

Cataloguing of published recordings by The Guess Who

The Guess Who is a Canadian rock band, originating as The Guess Who? in 1966, and adopting the name The Guess Who in 1968. Formed as a garage rock band, their best-known works are in the pop rock and psychedelic rock genres.

They were most successful from 1969 to 1975, under the leadership of singer/keyboardist Burton Cummings. During that period they released eleven studio albums, all of which reached the charts in Canada and the United States; their 1970 album American Woman reached no. 1 in Canada and no. 9 in the United States, and five other albums reached the top ten in Canada. They also achieved five number one singles in Canada and two in the United States.

== Studio albums ==
=== Credited to "Chad Allan & the Expressions (Guess Who?)" ===
(both names shown on the album cover) (no RPM Top Album charts until 1967)

Year	Album	Billboard 200	Record Label
1965	Shakin' All Over	–	Quality Records
1965	Hey Ho (What You Do to Me!)	–	Quality Records

=== As The Guess Who? ===
Year	Album	Billboard 200	Record Label
1966	It's Time	–	Quality Records
1968	A Wild Pair (Split album; side 1 by The Staccatos)	–	Nimbus 9 Records

=== As The Guess Who ===
Year	Album	Billboard 200	Canada (RPM)	Australia	Certification	Record Label
1969	Wheatfield Soul	45	3	-		RCA Victor
1969	Canned Wheat	91	23	-		RCA Victor
1970	American Woman	9	1	-	US: Gold	RCA Victor
1970	Share the Land	14	7	-	US: Gold	RCA Victor
1971	So Long, Bannatyne	52	10	-		RCA Victor
1972	Rockin'	79	9	33		RCA Victor
1973	Artificial Paradise	110	25	-		RCA Victor
1973	#10	155	7	-		RCA Victor
1974	Road Food	60	28	87		RCA Victor
1974	Flavours	48	11	81		RCA Victor
1975	Power in the Music	87	63	-		RCA Victor
1976	The Way They Were	–	-	-		RCA Victor

=== Unauthorized albums released by Jim Kale as the Guess Who ===
Year	Album	Billboard 200	Record label
1978	Guess Who's Back		Aquarius Records
1979	All This For A Song		Aquarius Records
1981	Now And Not Then		El Mocambo
1987	'87 (EP)		Guess Who Records
1994	Liberty		Aquarius Records
2018	The Future Is What It Used To Be		Cleopatra
2023	Plein d'Amour		DEKO

== Live albums ==
Year	Album	Billboard 200	Canada (RPM)	Australia	Record Label
1972	Live at the Paramount	39	17	55	RCA Victor
1984	Together Again	–	-	–	Ready Records
1984	Reunion	–	-	–	Quality Records
1984	The Best of the Guess Who-Live!	–	-	–	Compleat Records
2001	Running Back Thru Canada	–	-	–	ViK. Recordings
2004	The Best of Running Back Thru Canada	–	-	–	ViK. Recordings
2004	Extended Versions: The Encore Collection	–	-	–	SBME Special Products

== Compilation albums ==
Year	Album	Billboard 200	Canada (RPM)	Certification
1969	Super Golden Goodies (Canadian title)/The Guess Who (U.S. title)	–	30	
1970	Sown & Grown in Canada	–	-	
1971	Guess Who Plays the Guess Who	–	-	
1971	The Best of The Guess Who	12	9	CAN: Platinum; US: Gold
1972	Shakin' All Over (re-issue)	–	-	
1972	The History of the Guess Who	–	-	
1972	Wild One	–	-	
1973	The Best of The Guess Who Volume II	186	8	CAN: Gold
1977	The Greatest of the Guess Who	173	-	
1988	Track Record: The Guess Who Collection (2-CD)	–	85	
1992	These Eyes	–	-	
1993	At Their Best	–	-	
1997	The Ultimate Collection (3-CD)	–	-	
1999	Greatest Hits	–	-	
2001	This Time Long Ago	–	-	
2003	Platinum & Gold Collection	–	-	
2003	Anthology (2-CD)	–	-	
2005	Let's Go	–	-	
2006	Bachman-Cummings Song Book	–	-	
2010	The Essential Guess Who ("Anthology" re-issue)	–	-	

== Singles ==
Note that almost all of the band's early tracks, originally issued by "Chad Allan and the Reflections", "Bob Ashley and the Reflections" or "Chad Allan and the Original Reflections", were later re-issued on albums that were jointly credited to "Chad Allan & the Expressions"/"Guess Who?" (i.e. both group names appeared on the album cover).

Year	Title	Chart positions				Certification	Album	B-side
Year	Title	CAN	AUS	UK	US	Certification	Album	B-side
1962	Chad Allan and the Reflections: "Tribute to Buddy Holly" (Note: Early mispressed copies, though labelled "Tribute to Buddy Holly", played the track "I Just Didn't Have the Heart" on the A-side. Fewer than 100 copies of this mispressing are known to exist.) (Geoff Goddard)	-	-	-	-		Non-LP single	"Back and Forth"
1963	Chad Allan and the Reflections: "Shy Guy" (Chad Allan)	-	-	-	-		Shakin' All Over	"Baby's Got a Brand New Beau"
1963	Bob Ashley and the Reflections: "Inside Out" (Allan)	-	-	-	-		Hey Ho (What You Do to Me!)	"Made in England"
1964	Chad Allan and the Original Reflections: "Stop Teasing Me" (Randy Bachman)	-	-	-	-		Shakin' All Over / Hey Ho, What You Do to Me	"Shot of Rhythm 'N Blues"
1965	"Shakin' All Over" (Johnny Kidd)	1	27	-	22		Shakin' All Over	"Till We Kissed"
1965	"Till We Kissed" (Barry Mann/Cynthia Weil)	36	-	-	-		Shakin' All Over	"Shakin' All Over" (A-side)
1965	"Tossin' and Turnin'" (Richie Adams/Malou Rene)	3	-	-	-		Shakin' All Over	"I Want You to Love Me"
1965	"Hey Ho, What You Do to Me" (Jo Armstead/Nickolas Ashford/Valerie Simpson)	3	-	-	125		Hey Ho, What You Do to Me	"Goodnight, Goodnight"
1966	"Hurting Each Other" (Gary Geld/Peter Udell)	19	-	-	-		Hey Ho, What You Do to Me	"Baby's Birthday"
1966	"Believe Me" (Bachman)	10	-	-	-		It's Time	"Baby Feelin'"
1966	"Clock on the Wall" (Bachman)	16	-	-	-		It's Time	"One Day"
1966	"And She's Mine" (Bachman)	32	-	-	-		It's Time	"All Right"
1967	"His Girl" (Johnny Cowell)	19	-	45	-		Non-LP singles, later collected on numerous compilations	"It's My Pride"
1967	"Pretty Blue Eyes" (Teddy Randazzo/Robert Wilding)	48	-	-	-		Non-LP singles, later collected on numerous compilations	
1967	"This Time Long Ago" (Jerry Langley/Jimmy Stewart)	30	-	-	-		Non-LP singles, later collected on numerous compilations	"There's No Getting Away from You"
1967	"Flying on the Ground Is Wrong" (Neil Young)	36	-	-	-		Non-LP singles, later collected on numerous compilations	"If You Don't Want Me"
1968	"When Friends Fall Out" (Bachman/Burton Cummings)	75	-	-	-		American Woman (re-recording)	"Guess Who Blues"
1968	"Of a Dropping Pin" (Bachman/Cummings)	97	-	-	-		Canned Wheat (re-recording)	"Mr. Nothin'"
1969	"These Eyes" (Bachman/Cummings)	7	100	-	6	US: Gold	Wheatfield Soul	"Lightfoot"
1969	"Laughing" (Bachman/Cummings)	1	-	-	10	US: Gold	Canned Wheat	"Undun"
1969	"Undun" (Bachman)	21	73	-	22		Canned Wheat	"Laughing" (A-Side)
1969	"No Time" (Bachman/Cummings)	1	43	-	5		American Woman	"Proper Stranger"
1970	"American Woman" (Bachman/Cummings/Garry Peterson/Jim Kale)	1	43	19	1	US: Gold	American Woman	"No Sugar Tonight"
1970	"No Sugar Tonight" (Bachman)	1	-	19	1		American Woman	"American Woman" (A-side)
1970	"Hand Me Down World" (Kurt Winter)	10	65	-	17		Share the Land	"Runnin' Down the Street"
1970	"Share the Land" (Cummings)	2	63	-	10		Share the Land	"Bus Rider"
1971	"Bus Rider" (Winter)	-	63	-	-		Share the Land	"Share the Land" (A-side)
1971	"Hang On to Your Life" (Cummings/Winter)	5	-	-	43		Share the Land	"Do You Miss Me Darlin'"
1971	"Proper Stranger" (Bachman/Cummings) (Australian release only)	-	85	-	-		American Woman	"No Time" (A-Side)
1971	"Albert Flasher" (Cummings)	13	28	-	29		Non-LP single	"Broken"
1971	"Broken" (Cummings/Winter)	15	-	-	55		Non-LP single	"Albert Flasher" (A-side)
1971	"Rain Dance" (Cummings/Winter)	3	55	-	19		So Long, Bannatyne	"One Divided"
1971	"Sour Suite" (Cummings)	12	-	-	50		So Long, Bannatyne	"Life in the Bloodstream"
1972	"Life in the Bloodstream" (Cummings/Winter)	39	-	-	-		So Long, Bannatyne	"Sour Suite" (A-Side)
1972	"Heartbroken Bopper" (Cummings/Winter)	12	83	-	47		Rockin'	"Arrivederci Girl"
1972	"Guns, Guns, Guns" (Cummings)	58	-	-	70		Rockin'	"Heaven Only Moved Once Yesterday"
1972	"Runnin' Back to Saskatoon" (Cummings/Winter)	9	-	-	96		Live at the Paramount	"New Mother Nature"
1973	"Follow Your Daughter Home" (Cummings/Donnie McDougall/Peterson/Bill Wallace/Winter)	20	-	-	61		Artificial Paradise	"Bye Bye Babe"
1973	"Orly" (Cummings)	21	-	-	-		Artificial Paradise	"The Watcher"
1973	"Glamour Boy" (Cummings)	14	-	-	-		#10	"Lie Down"
1974	"Star Baby" (Cummings)	9	95	-	39		Road Food	"Musicioné"
1974	"Clap for the Wolfman" (Cummings/Wallace/Winter)	4	39	-	6		Road Food	"Road Food"
1975	"Dancin' Fool" (Cummings/Domenic Troiano)	14	85	-	28		Flavours	"Seems Like I Can't Live With You, But I Can't Live Without You"
1975	"Loves Me Like a Brother" (Cummings/Troiano)	21	-	-	-		Flavours	"Hoe Down Time"
1975	"Seems Like I Can't Live With You, But I Can't Live Without You" (Cummings/Troiano)	81	-	-	-		Flavours	"Dancin' Fool" (A-side)
1975	"Rosanne" (Cummings/Troiano)	55	-	-	105		Power in the Music	"Dreams"
1975	"When the Band Was Singin' 'Shakin' All Over'" (Cummings/Troiano)	-	-	-	102		Power in the Music	"Women"
1976	"Silver Bird" (Bachman/Cummings)	63	-	-	-		The Way They Were	"Runnin' Down the Street"

== Music videos ==
Year	Video
1969	"These Eyes"
1969	"When You Touch Me"
1969	"Laughing"
1970	"No Time"
1970	"American Woman"
1970	"Share the Land"
1970	"Hang On to Your Life"
1971	"Albert Flasher"
1972	"Runnin' Back to Saskatoon"
