= List of The Guess Who members =

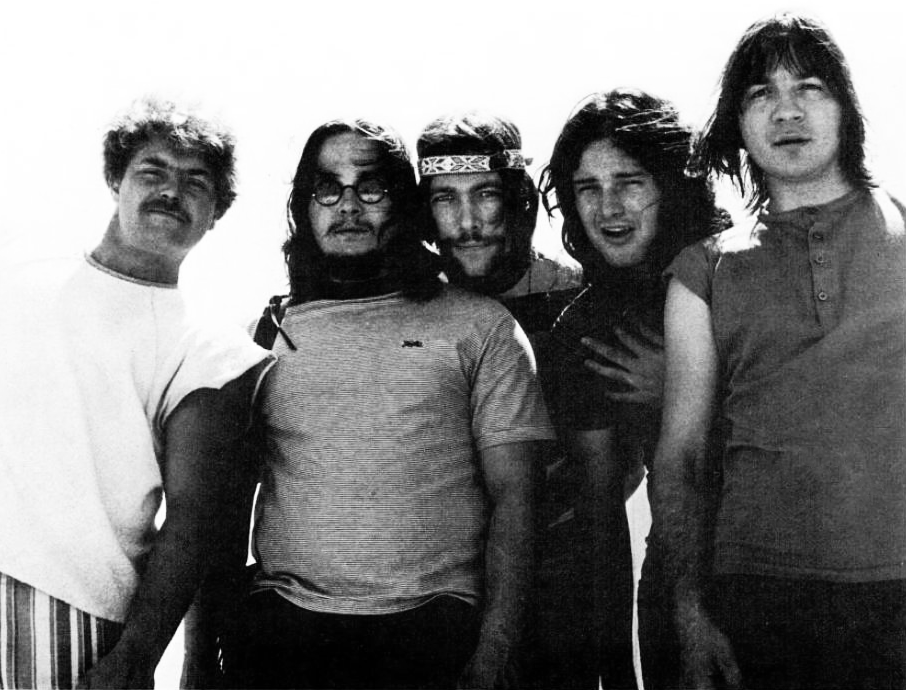
The Guess Who in 1970 (L-R: Kurt Winter, Garry Peterson, Greg Leskiw, Burton Cummings, Jim Kale)

The Guess Who is a Canadian rock band, originating as the Guess Who? in 1966, and adopting the name The Guess Who in 1968. They were most successful from 1969 to 1975, under the leadership of singer/keyboardist Burton Cummings. During that period they released eleven studio albums, all of which reached the charts in Canada and the United States; their 1970 album American Woman reached no. 1 in Canada and no. 9 in the United States, and five other albums reached the top ten in Canada. They also achieved five number one singles in Canada and two in the United States.

During the 1969-1975 era prior to the band's breakup, Cummings and drummer Garry Peterson were the only consistent members; they were joined by five guitarists and two bassists during those years. Cummings ended the band in 1975 and embarked on a solo career. In the following decades, Cummings and original guitarist Randy Bachman led several one-time reunion shows or short commemorative tours with various former members.

In 1978, original bassist Jim Kale organized a separate version of the band without the consent of Bachman and Cummings. Kale's band featured a frequently changing cast of musicians, sometimes including Peterson, and these lineups frequently toured on the nostalgia circuit. In 2024, Bachman and Cummings announced that they had gained control of the band's name, and disallowed Peterson from continuing to tour under the name (Kale had by then retired). In June 2025, Bachman and Cummings announced they would perform as The Guess Who at several shows in 2026.

This list article does not include musicians who filled in temporarily for official members or members of the version of the band led by Kale and Peterson.

== The Guess Who members (1962–1975) ==
| Image | Name | Years active | Instruments | Release contributions |
|---|---|---|---|---|
| | Garry Peterson | 1962–1975 (reunions 1979, 1983, 1999, 2000, 2000–2003) | drums; percussion; backing vocals | all Classic Era releases |
| | Jim Kale | 1962–1972 (reunions 1983, 1999, 2000) | bass; backing vocals | all releases from Shakin' All Over (1965) to Live at the Paramount (1972) |
| | Randy Bachman | 1962–1970; 2025–present (reunions 1979, 1983, 1999, 2000, 2000–2003) | lead guitar; backing vocals | all releases from Shakin' All Over (1965) to American Woman (1970) |
| | Chad Allan | 1962–1966 (died 2023) | vocals; rhythm guitar | Shakin' All Over (1965); Hey Ho (What You Do to Me!) (1965); It's Time (1966) |
| | Bob Ashley | 1962–1966 | keyboards; backing vocals | Shakin' All Over (1965); Hey Ho (What You Do to Me!) (1965) |
| | Burton Cummings | 1966–1975; 2025–present (reunions 1979, 1983, 1999, 2000, 2000–2003) | vocals; keyboards; rhythm guitar; flute; harmonica | all releases from It's Time (1966) to Power in the Music (1975) |
| | Bruce Decker | 1966–1966 (died 1986) | rhythm guitar | none |
| | Kurt Winter | 1970–1974 (died 1997) | lead and rhythm guitar · backing and occasional lead vocals | all releases from Share the Land (1970) to Road Food (1974) |
| | Greg Leskiw | 1970–1972 | lead and rhythm guitar · backing and occasional lead vocals | Share the Land (1970); So Long, Bannatyne (1971); Rockin' (1972) |
| | Donnie McDougall | 1972–1974 | lead and rhythm guitar · backing and occasional lead vocals | Live at the Paramount (1972); Artificial Paradise (1973); #10 (1973); Road Food (1974) |
| | Bill Wallace | 1972–1975 | bass; vocals | Artificial Paradise (1973); #10 (1973); Road Food (1974); Flavours (1974); Power in the Music (1975) |
| | Domenic Troiano | 1974–1975 (died 2005) | guitars; mandolin; backing vocals | Flavours (1974); Power in the Music (1975) |

== Lineups ==
| Years | Members | Studio and live releases |
|---|---|---|
| 1962 – January 1966 Chad Allan and the Reflections Chad Allan and the Expressions Guess Who? | Chad Allan – vocals, rhythm guitar; Bob Ashley – keyboards, backing vocals; Randy Bachman – lead guitar, backing vocals; Jim Kale – bass, vocals; Garry Peterson – drums | Shakin' All Over (1965); Hey Ho (What You Do to Me!) (1965) |
| January 1966 – May 1966 | The Guess Who?: Chad Allan – vocals, rhythm guitar; Burton Cummings – keyboards, vocals; Randy Bachman – lead guitar, backing vocals; Jim Kale – bass, backing vocals; Garry Peterson – drums | It's Time (1966) |
| May 1966 – August 1966 | Burton Cummings – vocals, keyboards; Randy Bachman – lead guitar, backing vocals; Bruce Decker – rhythm guitar; Jim Kale – bass, backing vocals; Garry Peterson – drums | |
| August 1966 – May 1970 Classic line-up | Burton Cummings – vocals, guitar, keyboards, flute, harmonica; Randy Bachman – guitar, backing vocals; Jim Kale – bass, backing vocals; Garry Peterson – drums, backing vocals | A Wild Pair (1968) side 2 only; Wheatfield Soul (1969); Canned Wheat (1969); American Woman (1970) |
| May 1970 – March 1972 | Burton Cummings – vocals, keyboards, flute, harmonica; Kurt Winter – lead guitar, vocals; Greg Leskiw – rhythm guitar, vocals; Jim Kale – bass, backing vocals; Garry Peterson – drums, backing vocals | Share the Land (1970); So Long, Bannatyne (1971); Rockin' (1972) |
| March 1972 – May 1972 | Burton Cummings – vocals, rhythm guitar, keyboards, flute, harmonica; Kurt Winter – lead guitar, backing vocals; Donnie McDougall – rhythm guitar, vocals; Jim Kale – bass, backing vocals; Garry Peterson – drums | Live at the Paramount (1972) |
| May 1972 – June 1974 | Burton Cummings – vocals, keyboards, flute, harmonica; Kurt Winter – lead guitar, backing vocals; Donnie McDougall – rhythm guitar, vocals; Bill Wallace – bass, vocals; Garry Peterson – drums | Artificial Paradise (1973); #10 (1973); Road Food (1974) |
| June 1974 – October 1975 | Burton Cummings – vocals, keyboards; Domenic Troiano – guitar, backing vocals; Bill Wallace – bass, backing vocals; Garry Peterson – drums | Flavours (1974); Power in the Music (1975) |

=== Reunion lineups ===
| Years | Members | Studio releases |
|---|---|---|
| November 1979 | Burton Cummings – vocals, keyboards; Randy Bachman – guitar; Bill Wallace – bass; Garry Peterson – drums | |
| 1983 | Burton Cummings – vocals, keyboards; Randy Bachman – guitar; Jim Kale – bass; Garry Peterson – drums | |
| 1999 | Burton Cummings – vocals, keyboards; Randy Bachman – guitar; Jim Kale – bass; Garry Peterson – drums | |
| 2000 | Burton Cummings – vocals, keyboards; Randy Bachman – guitar; Donnie McDougall – guitar; Jim Kale – bass; Garry Peterson – drums | |
| May 2000 – July 2003 | Burton Cummings – vocals, keyboards; Randy Bachman – guitar; Donnie McDougall – guitar; Bill Wallace – bass; Garry Peterson – drums | |
| 2026 | Burton Cummings – vocals, keyboards; Randy Bachman – guitar, vocals; Backed By: Jeff Jones – bass, backing vocals; Sean Fitzsimons – drums, backing vocals; Nick Sinopoli – percussion, backing vocals; Tim Bovaconti – guitar, backing vocals; Joe Augello – guitar, backing vocals | |
