= Bachman Cummings Songbook =

Compilation album by Randy Bachman and Burton Cummings
- Released: 2006
- Genre: Rock
- Label: Sony Music
- Producers: Randy Bachman, Burton Cummings

Professional ratings
Review scores
Source	Rating
AllMusic	4/5 stars

The Bachman Cummings Songbook is a compilation album by former The Guess Who members Randy Bachman and Burton Cummings, released in 2006 on Sony Music. The collection contains the top songs from The Guess Who, Bachman–Turner Overdrive, and Cummings' solo career.

== Track listing ==
Side A
No.	Title	Writer(s)	Performer(s)	Length
1.	"Laughing"	Bachman, Cummings	The Guess Who	2:44
2.	"These Eyes"	Bachman, Cummings	The Guess Who	3:47
3.	"Undun"	Bachman	The Guess Who	3:27
4.	"American Woman"	Bachman, Cummings, Kale, Peterson	The Guess Who	5:11
5.	"Albert Flasher"	Cummings	The Guess Who	2:29
6.	"No Sugar Tonight / New Mother Nature"	Bachman, Cummings	The Guess Who	4:56
7.	"No Time"	Bachman, Cummings	The Guess Who	3:50
8.	"Share the Land"	Cummings	The Guess Who	3:57
9.	"Sour Suite"	Cummings	The Guess Who	5:20
10.	"Let It Ride"	Bachman, Turner	Bachman–Turner Overdrive	4:28
11.	"Takin' Care of Business"	Bachman	Bachman–Turner Overdrive	4:52
12.	"You Ain't Seen Nothing Yet"	Bachman	Bachman–Turner Overdrive	3:56
13.	"Hey You"	Bachman	Bachman–Turner Overdrive	3:34
14.	"Lookin' Out for #1"	Bachman	Bachman–Turner Overdrive	5:22
15.	"Stand Tall"	Cummings	Burton Cummings	4:36
16.	"My Own Way to Rock"	Cummings	Burton Cummings	4:51
17.	"I'm Scared"	Cummings	Burton Cummings	4:10
18.	"Break It to Them Gently"	Cummings	Burton Cummings	4:38
19.	"I Will Play a Rhapsody"	Cummings	Burton Cummings	3:13
