= Undun (song) =

- 1969 US RCA Victor single

Single by the Guess Who

from the album Canned Wheat
- A-side: "Laughing"
- Released: July 1969
- Recorded: 1969
- Studio: A & R Recording (actual), RCA Studio A (contractual), New York City
- Genre: Jazz rock, pop rock, bossa nova
- Length: 3:26; 4:17 (album version)
- Label: RCA Victor
- Songwriter: Randy Bachman
- Producer: Jack Richardson

The Guess Who singles chronology
"These Eyes" (1968)	"Laughing" / "Undun" (1969)	"No Time" (1969)

"Undun" is a song recorded by the Canadian rock group the Guess Who from their album Canned Wheat (1969). "Undun" spent two weeks at number 21 on the Canadian Singles Chart in November–December 1969 and reached number 3 on the AC chart. In the US, it reached number 15 on the U.S. adult contemporary chart and number 22 on the Billboard Hot 100 in the week of November 29, 1969. "Undun" is Randy Bachman's favourite song written during his time with the Guess Who.

== Background ==
"Undun" was written by Bachman after hearing Bob Dylan's "Ballad in Plain D", which included the phrase "she was easily undone". Bachman's song tells the story of a girl he had seen at a party who, after dosing herself with LSD, slipped into a coma. The song takes its structure from jazz guitar chords Bachman had learned from his friend and neighbour Lenny Breau. Burton Cummings learned to play the flute for this track. Bachman said, "Burton could play the sax, and we discovered that a flute used the same fingering. We went to a music store, bought a flute, and he learned how to play the solo. He’d never played the flute in his life." Bachman used his Gibson ES-335 and a 1957 Gretsch 6120 Chet Atkins model to record the guitar parts.

The group was under contract to record with RCA Victor, and the label required them to make the album in RCA Studio A in New York. They found the studio to have obsolescent gear, and the performance space was far too big, intended for orchestras. The kick drum sounded like a thin click instead of the low thud they wanted. The band urged producer Jack Richardson to book time at A & R Recording where they had recorded Wheatfield Soul earlier that year. Without RCA's knowledge, the band recorded "Laughing" and "Undun" after hours at A & R, then returned to RCA and pretended to record the songs there. The clandestine recording session was discovered by RCA too late, after the album was released, and they took no action against the band. Bachman said that the two songs stand out on the album as having higher quality sound.

The original 4:17 version of "Undun", which includes a country-style guitar section at the end, appeared on the Guess Who's 1969 album, Canned Wheat, and an edit of that original was initially released as the B-side of the single "Laughing" which peaked on August 23, 1969.

== Composition ==
"Undun" has been described as jazz rock or a "jazz-tinged pop rock" song with a bossa nova flavour, especially the clean electric guitar work by Bachman, the signature flute solo by Cummings, and the chromatic movement of Jim Kale's electric bass lines. Garry Peterson maintains a standard rock drum style. Bachman said that the song's unusual structure "shouldn't have worked at all."

For his 2014 concerts, Bachman reworked the song into a "shuffle" style.

== Legacy ==
During the Guess Who's 2000 reunion Running Back Thru Canada tour, Cummings declared the song to be one of Bachman's finest compositions and "one of the best songs ever written by any Canadian songwriter".

Numerous jazz and other musicians have recorded "Undun". The American jazz singer Kurt Elling's 2007 version from his album Nightmoves was praised for its inventive arrangement by Rob Mounsey, and for Elling's haunting vocal lines. Several artists have emphasized the song's bossa nova aspects, including the Canadian singer Sophie Milman in 2007 on the album Make Someone Happy, and the American jazz singer Ranee Lee in 2004 on her album Maple Groove.

== Personnel ==
- Burton Cummings – vocals, flute
- Randy Bachman – guitar
- Jim Kale – bass
- Garry Peterson – drums

== Charts ==
Chart (1969)	Peak position
Canadian RPM Top Singles	21
Canada RPM Adult Contemporary	3
US Billboard Hot 100	22
US Adult Contemporary	15
