= Power in the Music =

Studio album by the Guess Who
- Released: July 1975
- Recorded: March 1975
- Genre: Rock
- Length: 43:00
- Label: RCA Victor
- Producer: Jack Richardson

The Guess Who chronology
Flavours (1974)	Power in the Music (1975)	The Way They Were (1976)

Singles from Power in the Music
- 1. "Rosanne" Released: 1975; 2. "When the Band Was Singin' 'Shakin' All Over" Released: 1975

Professional ratings
Review scores
Source	Rating
AllMusic	1.5/5 stars

Power in the Music is the fourteenth studio album by the Canadian rock band the Guess Who. The album was released in 1975 by RCA Records. It is their last album, before their disbandment in 1975. Subsequent studio recordings following this album were released by an unauthorized version of the band, led by bassist Jim Kale, and are not considered part of their official discography.

The album features two singles: "Rosanne" (U.S. #105, Canada #55) and "When the Band Was Singin' 'Shakin' All Over'" (U.S. #102). The lyrics of this 1975 song reference the Guess Who's 1965 hit "Shakin' All Over".

== Release history ==
In addition to the usual two channel stereo version the album was also released by RCA in a four channel quadraphonic version on both LP and 8-track tape. The quad LP version used the Quadradisc system.

The album was later released on compact disc by RCA/Iconoclassic with two bonus tracks.

== Track listing ==
All songs written by Burton Cummings and Domenic Troiano.

1. "Down and Out Woman" – 3:37
2. "Women" – 3:25
3. "When the Band Was Singin' ‘Shakin' All Over’" – 3:35
4. "Dreams" – 4:45
5. "Rich World/Poor World" – 6:20
6. "Rosanne" – 4:17
7. "Coors for Sunday" – 4:25
8. "Shopping Bag Lady" – 5:40
9. "Power in the Music" – 6:35

2014 Iconoclassic remaster bonus tracks:

- 10. "When the Band Was Singin' (Shakin' All Over)" (Rehearsal Take) – 4:54
- 11. "Coors for Sunday" (Rehearsal Take), Medley: "Then I Kissed Her" (Phil Spector, Ellie Greenwich, Jeff Barry), "Johnny B. Goode" (Chuck Berry), "Carol" (Berry), plus a snippet rehearsal take of "Shopping Bag Lady" – 13:38

== Personnel ==
The Guess Who

- Burton Cummings – lead vocals, keyboards
- Domenic Troiano – guitar, backing vocals
- Bill Wallace – bass, backing vocals
- Garry Peterson – drums

Additional personnel

- Brian Christian – engineer
- Jack Richardson – producer

== Charts ==
Chart (1975)	Peak position
Canada Top Albums/CDs (RPM)	63
US Billboard 200	87
