= Ironhorse =

Canadian rock band

Ironhorse was a Canadian rock band from Vancouver, formed by Randy Bachman, the former guitarist and singer of The Guess Who and Bachman-Turner Overdrive. The initial incarnation of the band also included Tom Sparks (vocals, guitars), John Pierce (bass), and Mike Baird (drums).

This lineup of Ironhorse released the 1979's Ironhorse album on the Scotti Brothers label, and had a minor U.S. hit single in April 1979 with "Sweet Lui-Louise", which peaked at No. 36 on the Billboard Hot 100 chart. In Canada, the song peaked slightly higher at No. 26. The same track reached No. 60 in the UK Singles Chart.

Ironhorse then underwent an almost complete lineup change, retaining only Bachman. The second incarnation of Ironhorse consisted of Bachman (guitars, vocals), Frank Ludwig (lead vocals, guitars), Ron Foos (bass), and Chris Leighton (drums). This lineup released 1980's Everything is Grey, also on Scotti Brothers Records. One of its singles, "What's Your Hurry Darlin'," peaked at No. 84 in Canada and at No. 89 in the US in May 1980.

Foos then left the group to rejoin Paul Revere and the Raiders. In 1980, Ironhorse disbanded, with the remaining members (Bachman/Leighton/Ludwig) forming Union with Bachman's former Bachman-Turner Overdrive band-mate Fred Turner. Union released one album, On Strike, on the CBS subsidiary Portrait Records, and had a minor hit with the track "Mainstreet U.S.A."

As of May 2013, Randy Bachman has secured the rights to the two Ironhorse albums.

== Discography ==
=== Ironhorse – Scotti Brothers (1979) ===
"Ironhorse" LP cover

==== Track listing ====
1. "One and Only" (Randy Bachman) – 3:32
2. "Sweet Lui-Louise" (Randy Bachman) – 3:11
3. "Jump Back In The Light" (Randy Bachman) – 3:11
4. "You Gotta Let Go" (Randy Bachman) – 4:00
5. "Tumbleweed" (Randy Bachman) – 3:19
6. "Stateline Blues" (Tom Sparks) – 3:47
7. "Watch Me Fly" (Tom Sparks) – 3:41
8. "Old Fashioned" (Randy Bachman) – dedicated to Slowhand – 3:10
9. "She's Got It" (Tom Sparks) – 3:12
10. "There Ain't No Cure" (Randy Bachman) – 3:57

==== Personnel ====
- Randy Bachman – vocals, guitars
- Tom Sparks – vocals, guitars
- John Pierce – bass
- Mike Baird – drums

=== Everything is Grey – Scotti Brothers (1980) ===
"Everything is Grey" LP cover

==== Track listing ====
1. "What's Your Hurry Darlin'" (Randy Bachman, Carl Wilson) – 4:28
2. "Everything Is Grey" (Randy Bachman) – 4:09
3. "Symphony" (Randy Bachman, Tom Sparks) – 3:24
4. "Only Way To Fly" (Frank Ludwig) – 3:56
5. "Try A Little Harder" (Randy Bachman, Frank Ludwig) – 3:30
6. "I'm Hurtin' Inside" (Randy Bachman) – 3:59
7. "Playin' That Same Old Song" (Randy Bachman, Frank Ludwig) – 3:50
8. "Railroad Love" (Randy Bachman) – 3:40
9. "Somewhere, Sometime" (Randy Bachman, Frank Ludwig) – 3:55
10. "Keep Your Motor Running" (Randy Bachman) – 3:44

==== Personnel ====
- Frank Ludwig – lead vocals, keyboards
- Randy Bachman – vocals, guitars
- Ron Foos – bass
- Chris Leighton – drums

with:

- Tom Sparks – backup vocals and guitar

== See also ==
- List of bands from Canada
- List of 1970s one-hit wonders in the United States
