= Survivor (Randy Bachman album) =

Studio album by Randy Bachman
- Released: 1978
- Studio: Studio 55 (Hollywood); Sunset Sound (Hollywood)
- Genre: Rock
- Length: 34:03 (original version)
- Label: Polydor
- Producer: Randy Bachman

Randy Bachman chronology
Axe (1970)	Survivor (1978)	Any Road (1992)

Survivor is the second solo album by the Guess Who and Bachman–Turner Overdrive's guitarist and singer Randy Bachman, released in 1978 on Polydor. It is a concept album about the rock and roll stars who have come and gone.

A remastered reissue was released through Cherry Red Records on August 4, 2009.

== Critical reception ==
Professional ratings
Review scores
Source	Rating
AllMusic	2/5 stars
The Rolling Stone Record Guide	2/5 stars

The Globe and Mail opined that "the truth is that Mr. Bachman, for all the years of dragging himself around this continent (and through Europe, too), has bamboozled countless thousands into following his ponderous, paleolithic rock while adding not a single tune or lyric that will last any longer than it takes to shuttle his albums to the used record bin."

== Track listing ==
All songs written by Randy Bachman.

1. "Just a Kid" – 3:21
2. "One Hand Clappin'" – 3:54
3. "Lost in the Shuffle" – 4:44
4. "Is the Night Too Cold for Dancin'" – 3:57
5. "You Moved Me" – 3:26
6. "I am a Star" – 5:20
7. "Maybe Again" – 6:20
8. "Survivor" – 3:01

== Personnel ==
- Randy Bachman – vocals, guitar, autoharp, guitar synthesizer, lap steel guitar
- Burton Cummings – keyboards, background vocals
- Jeff Porcaro – drums, percussion, Syndrumss
- Ian Gardiner - bass guitar
- Tom Scott – alto saxophone
- Patti Brooks – background vocals
- Becky Lopez – background vocals
- Petsye Powell – background vocals

Production

- Randy Bachman – production
- Howard Steele – engineering
- Case Veltri – engineering assistance
- Paul Little – photography
