= Follow Your Daughter Home =

- Cover of the 1973 German single

Single by The Guess Who

from the album Artificial Paradise
- B-side: "Bye Bye Babe"
- Released: December 1972 (CAN); January 1973 (US); May 1973 (UK)
- Recorded: 1972
- Genre: Rock; calypso
- Length: 3:41
- Label: Nimbus 9 0880 (CAN); RCA Victor 0880 (US); RCA Records 2361 (UK)
- Songwriters: Burton Cummings, Donnie McDougall, Garry Peterson, Bill Wallace, Kurt Winter
- Producer: Jack Richardson

The Guess Who singles chronology
"Runnin' Back to Saskatoon" (1972)	"Follow Your Daughter Home" (1972)	"Orly" (1973)

"Follow Your Daughter Home" is a song written by Burton Cummings, Donnie McDougall, Garry Peterson, Bill Wallace, and Kurt Winter and performed by The Guess Who. It reached #20 in Canada and #61 on the Billboard Hot 100 in 1973. The song was also released in the United Kingdom as a single, but it did not chart. The song was featured on their 1973 album, Artificial Paradise. The song has a calypso-influenced melody. The song was produced by Jack Richardson.
