= Laughing (The Guess Who song) =

- Reissue single

Single by The Guess Who

from the album Canned Wheat
- B-side: "Undun"
- Released: July 1969
- Recorded: 1969 at RCA Studio A, New York, New York
- Genre: Pop rock
- Length: 2:39
- Label: RCA Victor
- Songwriters: Randy Bachman, Burton Cummings
- Producer: Jack Richardson

The Guess Who singles chronology
"These Eyes" (1968)	"Laughing" / "Undun" (1969)	"No Time" (1969)

"Laughing" is a popular song by Canadian rock band the Guess Who. It peaked at #1 on the Canadian Singles Chart for a single week and at #10 on the United States' Billboard Hot 100, becoming the band's second single to reach the Top 10 on the latter. It became their second of three gold records in the United States and also made the Top 20 on singles charts in New Zealand and South Africa.

It appeared on their 1969 album, Canned Wheat, and was released as a single that year. It sold more than 350,000 copies in the first three weeks of release.

== Critical reception ==
Dave Bist of The Montreal Gazette has written that "These Eyes" and "Laughing" gave its audience the impression that the group only made music for the money. "Undun", the group's third "biggie", and "No Time", he wrote, changed that impression.

== Promo video ==
A rare black and white music video for the song exists.

== Personnel ==
- Burton Cummings - lead vocals, keyboards, rhythm guitar
- Randy Bachman - lead guitar, backing vocals
- Jim Kale - bass, backing vocals
- Garry Peterson - drums

== Charts ==
=== Weekly charts ===
Chart (1969)	Peak position
Canada Top Singles (RPM)	1
Canada Adult Contemporary (RPM)	3
New Zealand	19
South Africa (Springbok Radio)	20
US Billboard Hot 100	10
US Cash Box Top 100	4

=== Year-end charts ===
Chart (1969)	Rank
Canada	30
US Billboard Hot 100	96
US Cash Box Top 100	84

== Cover versions ==
The song was covered by saxophonist Dave Pell.

== Uses in popular culture ==
An edited version of the song is used in an Instagram post by film director Todd Phillips as foreground music of a camera test for 2019's Joker, featuring Joaquin Phoenix starring as the DC Comics character the Joker.

It was also used in trailers for the 2017 horror film Jigsaw; the sequel/soft reboot of the Saw film series.
