= Artificial Paradise (The Guess Who album) =

Studio album by the Guess Who
- Released: January 1973
- Recorded: 1972
- Studios: RCA's Music Center of the World, Hollywood, California
- Genre: Rock
- Length: 39:39
- Label: RCA Victor
- Producer: Jack Richardson

The Guess Who chronology
Live at the Paramount (1972)	Artificial Paradise (1973)	#10 (1973)

Singles from Artificial Paradise
- 1. "Follow Your Daughter Home" Released: 1973; 2. "Orly" Released: 1973

Professional ratings
Review scores
Source	Rating
AllMusic	(review/no rating)

Artificial Paradise is the tenth album by the Canadian rock band the Guess Who. It was released by RCA Records in 1973. This was the first album by the group to feature bassist Bill Wallace.

Musically, Artificial Paradise finds the Guess Who showcasing a variety of styles: rockers ("Orly", "All Hashed Out", "Rock and Roller Steam"), ballads ("Samantha's Living Room", "Lost and Found Town"), and even world music ("Hamba Gahle-Usalang Gahle").

The album is likely best remembered for its record jacket and inner sleeve, which is an extensive lampoon of direct mail advertising. The cover mentions The Guess Who only in passing.

== Release history ==
In addition to the usual 2 channel stereo version the album was also released by RCA in a 4 channel quadraphonic version on 8-track tape.

== Reception ==
AllMusic's Joe Viglione: "Artificial Paradise may be the most consistent album project by the post-Randy Bachman Guess Who, a solid offering of strong melodies, superb production, and focused artistic vision. (Despite the memorable cover art—or, perhaps, because of it) ...did much to sink this fine effort."

The album peaked at number 102 on the Billboard 200 in March 1973.

== Track listing ==
Side one

1. "Bye Bye Babe" (Winter, Wallace) - 2:50
2. "Samantha's Living Room" (McDougall) - 3:26
3. "Rock and Roller Steam" (Winter, Wallace) - 3:19
4. "Follow Your Daughter Home" (The Guess Who) - 3:42
5. "Those Show Biz Shoes" (Cummings) - 6:49

Side two

6. "All Hashed Out" (Cummings, Winter, Wallace) - 4:41
7. "Orly" (Cummings) - 2:54
8. "Lost and Found Town" (McDougall) - 3:49
9. "Hamba Gahle-Usalang Gahle" (Cummings, Winter, Wallace) - 4:53
10. "The Watcher" (Wallace, Cummings) - 3:10

== Personnel ==
The Guess Who

- Burton Cummings - lead vocals, keyboards, flute, harpsichord
- Kurt Winter - lead guitar
- Donnie McDougall - rhythm and acoustic guitar, backing vocals; lead vocals on "Samantha's Living Room" and "Lost and Found Town"
- Bill Wallace - bass, backing vocals; lead vocals on "Bye Bye Babe" and "All Hashed Out" (duet)
- Garry Peterson - drums

Additional personnel

- Bob Zimmitti - percussion, congas on "Follow Your Daughter Home"
- Stanley Winistock - fiddle on "Orly"

== Production ==
- Jack Richardson - producer
- Brian Christian - engineer
- Dennis Smith - technician
- Vic Anesini - mastering
- Ralph Chapman - liner notes
- Pacific Eye & Ear - concept
- Marty Slick - liner notes
- Lorrie Sullivan - photography
- Ron Thompson - writer

== Charts ==
Chart (1973)	Peak position
Canada Top Albums/CDs (RPM)	25
US Billboard 200	110
