= Lorelei Bachman =

Canadian writer and songwriter

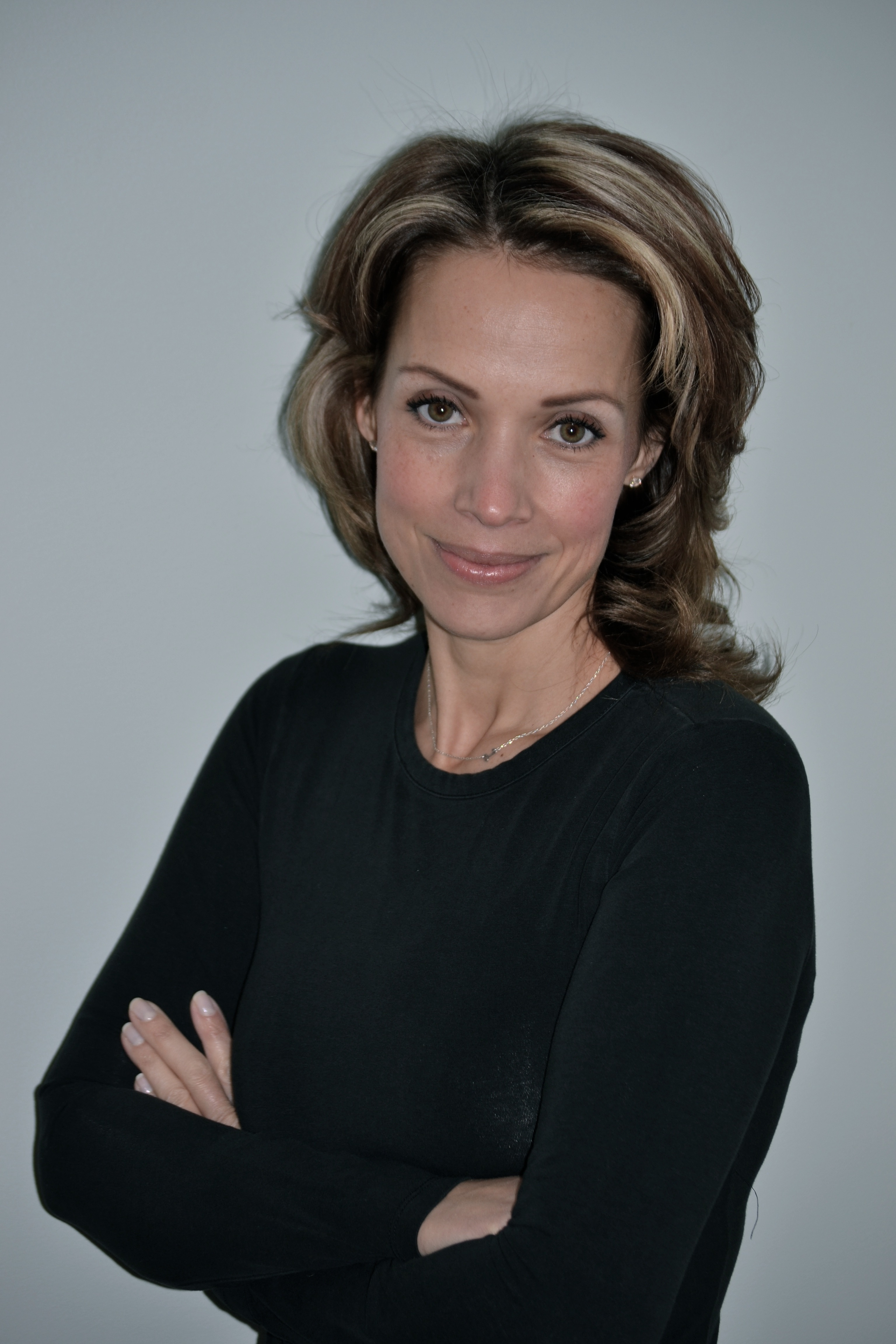

Background information
- Born: Lorelei Bachman; May 20, 1973 (age 53)
- Origin: Surrey, British Columbia, Canada
- Genres: Pop
- Occupations: Singer-songwriter, Author, Writer
- Instruments: Vocals, piano
- Years active: 1995–present
- Website: loreleibachman.com

Lorelei Elise Bachman (/ˈbækmən/ BAK-mən; born May 20, 1973) is a Canadian writer and songwriter.

== Personal life ==
Bachman is from Surrey, British Columbia, Canada. She is the daughter of Canadian rocker Randy Bachman of the classic rock bands The Guess Who and Bachman Turner Overdrive.

Bachman is of German, Scottish, Ukrainian and British descent. She accompanied her father and siblings to Germany for the CBC Genealogy program "Who Do You Think You Are?"

== Career ==
Bachman has written pop music for recording artists as well as thematic music for television and theatre. She co-wrote several selections for Koba Entertainment's Follow Your Berry Own Beat. Her music was also featured in the television series Edgemont.

Bachman is a published author. Her children’s book "Margo Madagascar" was published by Quarry Press in 2015 and featured at Word Vancouver 2016. Her second book, "Quiet Like Me" is soon to be released. Bachman was a regular column contributor for The Early Childhood Coalition. In addition, Bachman has written for print and online publications. She currently works as Social Media Manager.

== Education ==
Bachman holds a Bachelor of Arts in sociology and a Master of Arts in Integrated Studies in Cultural Studies from Athabasca University. Her thesis: "My Story or Yours: Challenges, Criticisms and Collaboration in Native Autobiography by Non-Native Collectors" was published by Athabasca University Press and is featured on the Indigenous Studies program portal at the University of Saskatchewan. She also holds a DÉLF language proficiency diploma from the French Ministry of Education and a diploma in pâtisserie from Dubrulle International Culinary School, now known as The Art Institute of Vancouver.

== Television ==
Network	Name	Notes
2007	CBC Television	Who Do You Think You Are?
2015	Katie Chats with Katie Uhlmann	"Socan Music Awards"
2017	Farpoint Films	Documentary: Bachman

== Radio ==
Year	Program Name	Notes
2013	CBC Radio Edmonton	"Follow Your Berry Own Beat - Promotional Interview"
2017	CBC Radio	"The Doc Project: Why I Left: Finding Freedom (under alias "Jane")
2018	The Drew Marshall Show Drew Marshall	Lorelei Bachman on Mother's Day

== Print ==
Year	Name	Notes
2014	Athabasca University	My Story or Yours: Challenges, Criticisms and Collaboration in Native Autobiography by Non-Native Collectors
2015	Quarry Press	"Margo Madagascar"
2017	Anglotopia	Exploring WWII in the Channel Islands: A Day Trip to Guernsey
2018	Anglotopia	Midwifery in the UK: From Florence Nightingale to Call the Midwife
2018	Lethbridge Herald	Alberta Early Childhood Coalition: The Importance of Parent-Child Play.
2018	Lethbridge Herald	Alberta Early Childhood Coalition: Developing Emotional Maturity.
2018	Lethbridge Herald	Alberta Early Childhood Coalition: Get Outside Get Healthy.
2018	Lethbridge Herald	Alberta Early Childhood Coalition: Developing Social Competence.
2018	Lethbridge Herald	Alberta Early Childhood Coalition: Kids and Electronics Can be a Balancing Act.
2021	Vocal Media	He Never Hated Cats Before
