= Wild One (The Guess Who album) =

Wild One!

Compilation album by the Guess Who
- Released: 1972
- Recorded: 1965–1967
- Genre: Rock
- Length: 21:42
- Label: Pickwick
- Producer: Bob Burns

The Guess Who chronology
Rockin' (1972)	Wild One! (1972)	Live at the Paramount (1972)

Professional ratings
Review scores
Source	Rating
AllMusic	1.5/5 stars

Wild One! is a compilation album by the Canadian rock band the Guess Who. It features tracks recorded and originally released in Canada between 1965 and 1967, prior to their breakout US success with "These Eyes". This album features original lead singer Chad Allan on lead vocals for all tracks except for 6 & 9, which are sung by Burton Cummings.

== Track listing ==
1. "Wild One" (Chad Allan)
2. "Baby Feelin'" (Johnny Kidd)
3. "I Want You to Love Me" (Jim Kale, Chris Youlden)
4. "Don't Be Scared" (Bruce Johnston)
5. "Tuff E Nuff" (Johnny Otis)
6. "Pretty Blue Eyes" (Steve Lawrence)
7. "Could This Be Love" (Helen Miller, Rose Marie McCoy)
8. "Shot of Rhythm and Blues" (Curtis Thompson)
9. "If You Don't Want Me" (Burton Cummings)
