= Ben McPeek =

Canadian musician (1934–1981)

- Born: 28 August 1934; Trail, British Columbia, Canada
- Died: 14 January 1981 (aged 46); Toronto, Ontario, Canada
- Education: The Royal Conservatory of Music; University of Toronto
- Occupations: composer, arranger, conductor, pianist

Benjamin Dewey McPeek (28 August 1934 – 14 January 1981) was a Canadian composer, arranger, conductor, and pianist.

== Early life ==
McPeek was born in Trail, British Columbia. He earned an associate degree from The Royal Conservatory of Music in 1954 and a Bachelor of Music from the University of Toronto in 1956. He was a pupil of John Beckwith, Gordon Delamont, Talivaldis Kenins, Oskar Morawetz, Godfrey Ridout, and John Weinzweig.

== Career ==
McPeek began performing as a pianist with dance bands in Toronto during the mid-1950s. In the late 1950s he performed with the Five Playboys with some frequency on CBC Radio.

In 1960 McPeek made his first foray into musical theatre when he became music director of the revue Up Tempo 60 at the King Edward Hotel. He went on to compose music for several other theatrical productions between 1963 and 1968, including That Hamilton Woman, Suddenly This Summer, Actually This Autumn, and Spring Thaw. In 1963 he wrote his first opera, The Bargain, which was based on the legend of Faust. The opera was filmed for CBC Television in 1966 and was later staged for the first time in 1978 by the COMUS Music Theatre of Canada. McPeek's original handwritten piano score for the opera is currently held in the collection at the Canadian Music Centre.

In 1964 McPeek established his own company, Ben McPeek Ltd., which promoted himself as a "jingle" writer for radio and television. He soon became the top jingle composer in Canada, and composed over 2,000 jingles during the 1960s and 1970s for such companies as Canadian National, Chargex, Coca-Cola, the Labatt Brewing Company, Speedy Muffler King, and the Toronto Dominion Bank.

McPeek composed works for brass and woodwind quintet, the Paul Bunyan Suite (1977, recorded by the Canadian Brass), six piano sonatas, a piano concerto, several works for solo piano, and the orchestral works Northern 484, Fantasia, and Concert Suite. He also co-wrote the musical Joey with Helen Porter, which was premièred in 1973 at the Charlottetown Festival.

McPeek was also involved in the popular music scene. In 1967, he co-founded the record label Nimbus 9 along with producer Jack Richardson and others. The label went on to produce several of The Guess Who's early albums. That year he also set up the Giant label.

He died in Toronto, aged 46.
