= A Good Feelin' to Know =

A Good Feelin’ to Know

Studio album by Poco
- Released: October 25, 1972
- Recorded: June 7–9, 1972
- Genre: Country rock
- Length: 40:42
- Label: Epic
- Producer: Jack Richardson, Jim Mason

Poco chronology
From the Inside (1971)	A Good Feelin’ to Know (1972)	Crazy Eyes (1973)

A Good Feelin’ to Know is the fourth studio album by the American country rock band Poco. The title track became the band's most recognizable tune from its early days. However, the album did not do as well commercially as expected, discouraging Richie Furay, who would leave the band after the release of the band's next album Crazy Eyes.

== Reception ==
Professional ratings
Review scores
Source	Rating
Allmusic	3/5 stars
Encyclopedia of Popular Music	5/5 stars

In his Allmusic review, music critic Bruce Eder wrote; "The album as a whole features a louder, harder-rocking sound a step or two removed from the country-rock they'd been known for... a curious throwback/advance. This album's relative failure made Richie Furay begin to lose faith in his own group's prospects."

== Track listing ==
1. "And Settlin' Down" (Richie Furay) – 3:41
2. "Ride the Country" (Paul Cotton) – 6:25
3. "I Can See Everything" (Timothy B. Schmit) – 3:32
4. "Go and Say Goodbye" (Stephen Stills) – 2:46
5. "Keeper of the Fire" (Cotton) – 4:20
6. "Early Times" (Cotton) – 4:23
7. "A Good Feelin' to Know" (Furay) – 3:53
8. "Restrain" (Schmit) – 5:13
9. "Sweet Lovin'" (Furay) – 6:23

== Charts ==
Chart (1972/73)	Position
Australia (Kent Music Report)	63
Canada	66
United States (Billboard 200)	69

== Personnel ==
- Paul Cotton – guitar, vocals
- Richie Furay – guitar, vocals
- Rusty Young – steel guitar, guitar, vocals
- Timothy B. Schmit – bass, vocals
- George Grantham – drums, vocals

With:

- Barry Flast – piano

== Production ==
- Producer: Jack Richardson, Jim Mason
