= Wheatfield Soul =

Studio album by The Guess Who
- Released: March 1969
- Recorded: September 1968
- Studios: A & R Studios, New York
- Genres: Rock; pop; psychedelic rock
- Length: 40:27
- Label: Nimbus 9, RCA Victor
- Producer: Jack Richardson

The Guess Who chronology
It's Time (1966)	Wheatfield Soul (1969)	Canned Wheat (1969)

Singles from Wheatfield Soul
- 1. "These Eyes" Released: December 1968 (CAN) April 1969 (US)

Professional ratings
Review scores
Source	Rating
Allmusic	2.5/5 stars
Robert Christgau	B−
Rolling Stone	(positive)

Wheatfield Soul is the fourth studio album by the Canadian rock band the Guess Who, released in March 1969. Their first RCA Records release, the album is also notable for being the first full-length Guess Who album to feature Burton Cummings exclusively on lead vocals, without original lead singer Chad Allan. Featuring the US top 10 hit "These Eyes", it marked the beginning of the band's international success.

== Release history ==
"These Eyes" was released as a single. Wheatfield Soul is the group's first psychedelic LP that also focuses on British influenced pop and rock. An original version of "Friends of Mine" is on the Guess Who's posthumous compilation This Time Long Ago.

Added to the 2009 remastered CD version was "When Friends Fall Out," "Guess Who Blues," and "Of a Dropping Pin." This version of "When Friends Fall Out" never made it to any original, early Guess Who albums. A later re-recording appeared on American Woman.

== Track listing ==
=== Original release ===
All songs written by Randy Bachman and Burton Cummings except where noted.

Side one

1. "These Eyes" – 3:45
2. "Pink Wine Sparkles in the Glass" – 2:13
3. "I Found Her in a Star" (Cummings) – 2:36
4. "Friends of Mine" – 10:04

Side two

5. "When You Touch Me" (Bachman, Cummings, Rob Matheson) – 3:38
6. "A Wednesday in Your Garden" (Bachman) – 3:20
7. "Lightfoot" (Bachman, Cummings, Matheson) – 3:07
8. "Love and a Yellow Rose" – 5:05
9. "Maple Fudge" – 1:49
10. "We're Coming to Dinner" – 2:43

=== 2009 Remastered CD (IconoClassic ICON 1008) ===
1. "These Eyes"
2. "Pink Wine Sparkles in the Glass"
3. "I Found Her in a Star"
4. "Friends of Mine"
5. "When You Touch Me"
6. "A Wednesday in Your Garden"
7. "Lightfoot"
8. "Love and a Yellow Rose"
9. "Maple Fudge"
10. "We're Coming to Dinner"
11. "When Friends Fall Out" – 3:17 (#75 Canada, July 1968)
12. "Guess Who Blues" – 3:31
13. "Of a Dropping Pin" – 3:24 (#97 Canada, December 1968)

== Personnel ==
The Guess Who

- Burton Cummings – lead vocals, piano, organ, rhythm guitar, flute
- Randy Bachman – lead guitar, sitar
- Jim Kale – bass, backing vocals
- Garry Peterson – drums, percussion, tablas

Production

- Jack Richardson − producer
- Ben McPeek − musical director
- David Greene − engineer
- Elliot Scheiner − engineer
- CD Mastered by Bob Irwin at Sundazed Studios, Coxsackie, New York, and Vic Anesini at Sony Music Studios, New York City

== Charts ==
Chart (1969)	Peak position
Canada Top Albums/CDs (RPM)	3
US Billboard 200	45
