= American Woman =

1970 single by the Guess Who

- US reissue single

Single by the Guess Who

from the album American Woman
- B-side: "No Sugar Tonight"
- Released: March 1970
- Recorded: August 13, 1969
- Genre: Blues rock; hard rock; psychedelic rock
- Length: 3:50 (single version); 5:07 (album version)
- Label: RCA Victor
- Songwriters: Burton Cummings; Garry Peterson; Jim Kale; Randy Bachman
- Producer: Jack Richardson

The Guess Who singles chronology
"No Time" (1969)	"American Woman" (1970)	"Hand Me Down World" (1970)

Audio
- "The Guess Who - American Woman (Official Audio)" on YouTube

"American Woman" is a song by the Canadian rock band the Guess Who. The song was first released in January 1970 on the album American Woman, and again in March 1970 as the second single from the album, backed with "No Sugar Tonight". The song reached number one for three weeks commencing May 9 on both the United States' Billboard Hot 100 and the Canadian RPM magazine singles chart. Billboard magazine placed the single at number three on the Year-End Hot 100 singles of 1970 list, and it was listed as number five for 1970 on the RPM Year-End Chart. On May 22, 1970, the single was certified as gold by the Recording Industry Association of America (RIAA). It also reached the top ten in the Netherlands, Switzerland and Austria, and the top twenty in the United Kingdom and New Zealand.

Produced by Jack Richardson, the single was recorded on August 13, 1969, at RCA's Mid-America Recording Center in Chicago.

== Writing and lyrics ==
The music and lyrics of the song "American Woman" were improvised on stage during a concert in Southern Ontario. Guitarist Randy Bachman recalled it being at a concert in Kitchener, although lead singer Burton Cummings said it was at the Broom and Stone, a curling rink in Scarborough. Bachman was playing notes while tuning his guitar after replacing a broken string, and he realized he was playing a new riff that he wanted to remember. He continued playing it and the other band members returned to the stage and joined in, creating a jam session in which Cummings improvised the lyrics. They noticed a kid with a cassette recorder making a bootleg recording and asked him for the tape. They listened to the tape and noted down the words that Cummings had extemporized, and which he later revised.

The song's lyrics have been the matter of debate, often interpreted as an attack on U.S. politics (especially the draft). Cummings, who composed the lyrics, said in 2013 that they had nothing to do with politics. "What was on my mind was that girls in the States seemed to get older quicker than our girls and that made them, well, dangerous. When I said 'American woman, stay away from me,' I really meant 'Canadian woman, I prefer you.' It was all a happy accident."

Jim Kale, the group's bassist, explained his take on the lyrics:

The popular misconception was that it was a chauvinistic tune, which was anything but the case. The fact was, we came from a very strait-laced, conservative, laid-back country, and all of a sudden, there we were in Chicago, Detroit, New York – all these horrendously large places with their big city problems. After that one particularly grinding tour, it was just a real treat to go home and see the girls we had grown up with. Also, the war was going on, and that was terribly unpopular. We didn't have a draft system in Canada, and we were grateful for that. A lot of people called it anti-American, but it wasn't really. We weren't anti-anything. John Lennon once said that the meanings of all songs come after they are recorded. Someone else has to interpret them.

Bachman expressed the view in 2014 that it was "an anti-war protest song", explaining that when they came up with it on stage, the band and the audience had a problem with the Vietnam War. Said Bachman: "We had been touring the States. This was the late '60s, one time at the US/Canada border in North Dakota they tried to draft us and send us to Vietnam. We were back in Canada, playing in the safety of Canada where the dance is full of draft dodgers who've all left the States".

The Guess Who were invited to play at the White House on July 17, 1970, shortly after the song's release. It was reported that, because of its perceived anti-American lyrics, Pat Nixon, the wife of President Richard Nixon, asked that they not play "American Woman". However, Cummings later clarified that it was the band's own idea not to play it, and that their manager had created the earlier story as a publicity stunt.

== Personnel ==
- Burton Cummings – vocals
- Randy Bachman – lead and rhythm guitar
- Jim Kale – bass
- Garry Peterson – drums

While most of the band's charting songs during this period were credited to just Bachman or Cummings alone or the pair, this piece was credited to all four members of the band; this was in keeping with the way they all first improvised it together on stage. This full-band writing credit happened only one other time on a Guess Who single, with their 1973 top 20 Canadian hit "Follow Your Daughter Home", albeit with a different line-up.

== Charts ==
=== Weekly charts ===
Chart (1970)	Peak position
Argentina (CAPIF)	9
Australia	43
Austria (Top 40)	7
Canadian RPM Singles Chart	1
Netherlands (Dutch Charts)	4
New Zealand (Listener)	16
Switzerland (Hit Parade Top 75 Singles)	4
UK (The Official Charts Company)	19
US Billboard Hot 100	1
US Cash Box Top 100	1

=== Year-end charts ===
Chart (1970)	Rank
Australia	105
Canada	5
Netherlands (Single Top 100)	76
US Billboard Hot 100	3
US Cash Box Top 100	7

== Certifications ==
Region	Certification	Certified units/sales
Canada (Music Canada)	2× Platinum	160,000^{‡}
United States (RIAA)	Gold	1,000,000^{^}
^{^} Shipments figures based on certification alone.^{‡} Sales+streaming figures based on certification alone.

== Lenny Kravitz version ==
"American Woman"
- Standard non-US artwork

Single by Lenny Kravitz

from the album 5 and Austin Powers: The Spy Who Shagged Me
- B-side: "Fields of Joy" (live)
- Released: May 10, 1999
- Genre: Funk rock; alternative rock
- Length: 4:21 (album version); 3:53 (radio edit)
- Label: Virgin
- Songwriters: Burton Cummings; Garry Peterson; Jim Kale; Randy Bachman
- Producer: Lenny Kravitz

Lenny Kravitz singles chronology
"Fly Away" (1998)	"American Woman" (1999)	"Black Velveteen" (1999)

Music video
- "Lenny Kravitz - American Woman (Official Music Video)" on YouTube

American singer-songwriter Lenny Kravitz covered "American Woman" for the soundtrack of Austin Powers: The Spy Who Shagged Me. It was released as a single in May 1999 and was later included on the reissue of Kravitz's 1998 album 5. Kravitz's version, which he produced himself, is slower and softer than the original, without the signature guitar solo; he later said to Randy Bachman that the reason why he skipped the lead guitar part was "I couldn't get the sound. I couldn't get the tone."

The cover reached the top 20 in Australia, Finland, Iceland, New Zealand, and Spain, as well as number 26 in Canada and number 49 on the US Billboard Hot 100. The music video (directed by Paul Hunter) featured actress Heather Graham (who starred in The Spy Who Shagged Me). In 1999, the Guess Who joined Kravitz and his band for a live performance of "American Woman" at the MuchMusic Video Awards.

=== Awards ===
Year	Nominee / work	Award	Result
2000	42nd Annual Grammy Awards	Best Male Rock Vocal Performance	Won

=== Track listings ===
UK and European CD single

1. "American Woman" (single version) – 3:50
2. "Fields of Joy" (live) – 4:20

Australasian CD EP

1. "American Woman" (single version) – 3:50
2. "Straight Cold Player" (live) – 3:42
3. "Thinking of You" (Hexum Dancehall remix) – 5:58
4. "Fields of Joy" (live) – 4:20

=== Charts ===
==== Weekly charts ====
Chart (1999)	Peak position
Australia (ARIA)	14
Canada Top Singles (RPM)	26
Canada Rock/Alternative (RPM)	2
Finland (Suomen virallinen lista)	16
France (SNEP)	88
Germany (GfK)	78
Iceland (Íslenski Listinn Topp 40)	2
Netherlands (Dutch Top 40 Tipparade)	8
Netherlands (Single Top 100)	59
New Zealand (Recorded Music NZ)	12
Spain (Promusicae)	19
Sweden (Sverigetopplistan)	59
US Billboard Hot 100	49
US Adult Alternative Airplay (Billboard)	18
US Adult Pop Airplay (Billboard)	23
US Alternative Airplay (Billboard)	7
US Mainstream Rock Airplay (Billboard)	3
US Pop Airplay (Billboard)	17

==== Year-end charts ====
Chart (1999)	Position
Australia (ARIA)	71
Canada Rock/Alternative (RPM)	10
US Adult Top 40 (Billboard)	79
US Mainstream Rock Tracks (Billboard)	14
US Mainstream Top 40 (Billboard)	96
US Modern Rock Tracks (Billboard)	24

Chart (2000)	Position
US Adult Top 40 (Billboard)	87
US Mainstream Top 40 (Billboard)	96

=== Certifications and sales ===
Region	Certification	Certified units/sales
Australia (ARIA)	Gold	35,000^{^}
United States	—	655,489
^{^} Shipments figures based on certification alone.

=== Release history ===
Region	Date	Format(s)	Label(s)	Ref(s).
United States	May 10, 1999	Mainstream rock; active rock; alternative radio	Virgin	
United States	June 21, 1999	Hot adult contemporary; modern adult contemporary; contemporary hit radio	Virgin	
United Kingdom	August 30, 1999	CD; cassette	Virgin	

== Other cover versions ==
"American Woman" has been covered by a number of artists. In 1982, Swiss hard rock band Krokus included a cover on their album One Vice at a Time. Butthole Surfers released a cover version on a bonus 5" vinyl single included with their 1985 home video release Blind Eye Sees All. The 2002 DVD reissue uses the same version as background music for the bonus photo gallery. They also made a drum-heavy experimental remix version of this recording, which appeared on their 1986 album Rembrandt Pussyhorse. Anal Cunt recorded a grindcore version for their 1995 album Top 40 Hits.

The Memphis alternative rock band, Muddy Magnolias, borrowed the title and referenced the main riff in the song's bridge, but their "American Women" is otherwise a different song.

== Use in film ==
The song was featured in Sam Mendes's film American Beauty, performed by main character Lester Burnham (played by Kevin Spacey). Sam Eagle (voiced by Eric Jacobson) performed a karaoke version of this song in a Muppets viral video, until he stops in protest of its lyrics, and finds that it is a Canadian song even more upsetting. It was used in the trailer for the 2012 HBO film Game Change. A version sung by an older man at a karaoke party (Harper Roisman) was used in the film The Cable Guy (1996). It was heard during the ending credits of the Witchblade TV film (2000), starring Yancy Butler and based on the Top Cow comic book series. "American Woman" was featured in the second installment of the Austin Powers film trilogy, The Spy Who Shagged Me, with Felicity Shagwell (Heather Graham) dancing provocatively whilst it played. The song was featured in the second episode of Due South's first season, "Diefenbaker's Day Off". Kelly Clarkson recorded a cover version of the song as a theme song from the Paramount Network TV series, American Woman.

== See also ==
- List of anti-war songs
