= No Time (The Guess Who song) =

1969 single by The Guess Who

Song by the Guess Who

from the album Canned Wheat
- Released: September 1969
- Recorded: 1969
- Studio: RCA Studio A, New York, New York
- Genre: Pop rock; hard rock; psychedelic pop
- Length: 3:44 (single version)
- Label: Nimbus 9, RCA Victor
- Songwriters: Randy Bachman, Burton Cummings
- Producer: Jack Richardson

"No Time"
- US reissue single

Single by the Guess Who

from the album American Woman
- B-side: "Proper Stranger"
- Released: November 1969
- Recorded: August 12, 1969
- Studio: RCA Mid-America Recording Center, Studio B, Chicago, Illinois
- Genre: Pop rock; hard rock; psychedelic pop
- Length: 3:50
- Label: RCA Victor
- Songwriters: Randy Bachman, Burton Cummings
- Producer: Jack Richardson

The Guess Who singles chronology
"Laughing" / "Undun" (1969)	"No Time" (1969)	"American Woman" / "No Sugar Tonight" (1970)

"No Time" is a song by Canadian rock band the Guess Who, composed by guitarist Randy Bachman and lead singer Burton Cummings.

There are two versions of the song. The original recording was done for the Guess Who's album Canned Wheat, but it is the re-recording featured on the American Woman album that was released as a single in 1969 and is the better-known. It is slightly faster in tempo and has the two verses transposed, but the extended Bachman guitar solo was cut. The single peaked at No. 5 in the U.S. and was the third in a string of million-selling singles that all hit No. 1 in Canada for The Guess Who. It also made the Top 20 in New Zealand.

== Background ==
"No Time" is a breakup song; a reverse Dear John letter stating, "No time left for you." Of the song, Randy Bachman said, "That was our country-rock song... Me and Burton trying to be like Neil [Young] and Stephen Stills." The song was composed on a Saturday at Cummings' mother's house, where Bachman came up with the guitar line and the song built from that.

== Chart performance ==
=== Weekly charts ===
Chart (1969–1970)	Peak position
Australia	43
Canada RPM	1
New Zealand (Listener)	16
US Billboard Hot 100	5
US Cash Box Top 100	4

=== Year-end charts ===
Chart (1970)	Rank
Canada	12
U.S. Billboard	70
U.S. Cash Box	21

== Certifications ==
Region	Certification	Certified units/sales
Canada (Music Canada)	Gold	40,000^{‡}
^{‡} Sales+streaming figures based on certification alone.

== In popular culture ==
- This song was used in the movie Pirates of Silicon Valley and the miniseries Canada Russia '72.
