= Canned Wheat =

Studio album by the Guess Who
- Released: September 1969
- Recorded: 1969
- Studios: RCA, New York City; A&R, New York City
- Genres: Rock, psychedelic rock
- Length: 40:12
- Label: RCA Victor
- Producer: Jack Richardson

The Guess Who chronology
Wheatfield Soul (1969)	Canned Wheat (1969)	American Woman (1970)

Singles from Canned Wheat
- 1. "Of a Dropping Pin" Released: 1968; 2. "Laughing / Undun" Released: July 1969

Professional ratings
Review scores
Source	Rating
Allmusic	4.5/5 stars
Rolling Stone	(favorable)

Canned Wheat is the fifth studio album by Canadian rock band the Guess Who, released in September 1969. It peaked at number 91 on the Billboard Pop Albums chart. Two of the band's hits were taken from the album: "Laughing" and "Undun". The album also includes the original version of "No Time" which would later be re-recorded for their American Woman album and released as a single. The album is regarded as a rock classic.

== Production ==
The band was sent to record the follow-up to Wheatfield Soul at RCA Studio A in New York City. As per company policy at the time, RCA recording artists were required to use the company's own studios. Wheatfield Soul was cut independently and before the band signed with RCA. The band and their producer Jack Richardson felt that the sound at RCA was inferior to that of the independent A&R Studios, where Wheatfield Soul was recorded. They duly recorded Canned Wheat at RCA and secretly re-recorded two of the strongest numbers "Laughing" and "Undun" nearby at A&R. To prove the point that the RCA studio was unsuitable, A&R dubs of "Laughing" and "Undun" were sent to RCA. When RCA released "Laughing" and "Undun" as a two-sided single and it began to hit the charts, RCA wanted an album put out as soon as possible. There was no time to re-record the rest of the material, so Canned Wheat was released, as recorded at RCA studios, yet including the "Laughing" and "Undun" versions cut at A&R.

== Release history ==
Canned Wheat was first issued as RCA Victor LSP-4157 in 1969. It was reissued in the RCA "Pure Gold" budget line series as ANL1-0981 in 1975 and reissued again by budget label Pickwick by arrangement with RCA as ACL-7067. In addition to the standard two channel stereo version a four-channel quadraphonic mix was also issued on the 8-track tape format in 1971.

RCA first reissued the album on compact disc in 1988. It was then remastered and re-released on CD by Buddah Records in 2000 and included two bonus tracks. The first run of Buddah CD pressings accidentally replaced the song "Species Hawk" with "Miss Frizzy". This was corrected on the second run and the pressings with "Miss Frizzy" are collector's items now. Both songs ("Silver Bird" and "Miss Frizzy") are featured on the 1976 album The Way They Were.

== Track listing ==
All songs written by Randy Bachman and Burton Cummings except where noted.

Side one

1. "No Time" – 5:15
2. "Minstrel Boy" – 3:18
3. "Laughing" – 3:05
4. "Undun" (Bachman) – 4:17
5. "6 A.M. or Nearer" (Bachman) – 5:24

Side two

6. "Old Joe" (Cummings) – 3:07
7. "Of a Dropping Pin" – 3:42
8. "Key" – 11:24
9. "Fair Warning" – 1:44

=== 2000 re-issue bonus tracks ===
10. "Species Hawk" – 3:33 [some copies mistakenly include "Miss Frizzy" – 5:06]
11. "Silver Bird" – 2:43

== Personnel ==
The Guess Who

- Burton Cummings – lead vocals, piano, organ, rhythm guitar, flute, harmonica
- Randy Bachman – lead & rhythm guitar, co-lead vocals, sitar
- Jim Kale – bass, backing vocals
- Garry Peterson – drums, percussion, tabla, congas, backing vocals

Production

- Jack Richardson – producer
- John Woram – engineer

== Charts ==
Chart (1969−1970)	Peak position
Canada Top Albums/CDs (RPM)	23
US Billboard 200	91
