= These Eyes =

- Reissue single

Single by the Guess Who

from the album Wheatfield Soul
- B-side: "Lightfoot"
- Released: December 1968 (Canada); March 1969 (US)
- Recorded: September 19 and 21, 1968
- Genre: Pop rock; baroque pop; blue-eyed soul
- Length: 3:45
- Label: Nimbus 9 (Canada); RCA Victor (US)
- Songwriters: Randy Bachman, Burton Cummings
- Producer: Jack Richardson

The Guess Who singles chronology
"Of a Dropping Pin" (1968)	"These Eyes" (1968)	"Laughing" / "Undun" (1969)

"These Eyes" is a song by the Canadian rock band the Guess Who. The song was co-written by the group's lead guitarist Randy Bachman and lead singer Burton Cummings and originally included on the band's 1969 album Wheatfield Soul. It was first released as a single (backed by a tribute to Gordon Lightfoot titled "Lightfoot"), in their native Canada, where its chart success (#7), along with the influence of CKLW-AM Windsor's radio station music director Rosalie Trombley, helped land them a U.S. distribution deal with RCA Records. It was subsequently released in the U.S. in March 1969, and became a breakthrough success for the group (and for Canadian music in general, which would see a sudden rise in popularity throughout North America); it would be their first single to reach the top ten on the Billboard Pop Singles chart, peaking at number six, and would eventually be certified gold by the RIAA for sales of over one million copies. It was also a top ten hit in South Africa. While it was actually the 18th single released by the band overall, it was the first from the line-up of Cummings, Bachman, Jim Kale, and Garry Peterson as produced by Jack Richardson.

== Background and writing ==
Bachman had the original piano chords with an original title of "These Arms". Cummings changed the title to "These Eyes" and added the middle eight. At first, the band didn't want to release the song, and considered the gentle ballad too great a departure from their hard rock roots. The song features an orchestral arrangement by Ben McPeek.

== Content ==
The song is noted for its repeated long section which starts in C major, then goes up a whole tone to D major, then up a whole tone again in E major, and finally in the coda to F-sharp major, before the fade.

== Personnel ==
- Burton Cummings - lead vocals, Hohner Pianet electric piano
- Randy Bachman - guitar
- Jim Kale - bass
- Garry Peterson - drums

== Covers ==
Among the many cover versions released over the years, Junior Walker & the All-Stars' version reached number three on the R&B Singles Chart, number 16 on the Billboard Pop Singles in October 1969, and number 28 in Canada.

Alton Ellis' cover of this song is featured on his 1970 album Sunday Coming. This reggae arrangement was produced by Coxsone Dodd. In 1971 another reggae adaptation followed: "These Eyes (Crying every night)" by Stranger Cole (produced by Byron Smith) followed by Tommy McCook and the Supersonics instrumental version titled "Mighty Alley". Subsequently U-Roy and Hopeton Lewis sang and toasted new lyrics over "Mighty Alley" to create the recording "Tom Drunk", both recordings produced by Duke Reid. Herman Marquis also issued an instrumental version titled "Tom's Version", produced by Byron Smith.

Michael Bolton, then known as Michael Bolotin, covered the song on his 1976 sophomore solo album Everyday of My Life.

Natalie Cole covered the song on her 1981 album Happy Love, her final album under her Capitol Records contract.

Filipino Singer Gary Valenciano covered the song on his 1995 album Outside Looking In with his Dance Version.

Canadian hip-hop artist Maestro Fresh Wes sampled this song for his 1998 Canadian hit "Stick to Your Vision" from the Built to Last album. In addition, the chorus (of which the first part states "These eyes/Seen a lot of shame in the game/These eyes/Seen a lot of pain in the fame/These eyes/Seen a lot of highs and lows/But that's just the way life goes") uses Burton Cummings' vocals for the words "these eyes" in a call-and-response manner.

Canadian musician Lawrence Gowan released a cover of the song on his Best of... greatest hits release in 1997 as a tribute to the Guess Who being the first concert he ever saw when he was a child.

The song was covered by jacksoul on their 2006 album mySOUL.

The song was featured in the 2007 American comedy film Superbad where it is sung by Michael Cera.

The band Ween would often perform a humorous cover of the song live called "Deez Nutz".

In 2008, Gregg Gillis, better known to the public as Girl Talk, sampled the song for the track entitled "Set It Off" from his fourth album, Feed the Animals.

The song is briefly sung by the character Donkey in the 2010 DreamWorks Animation film, Shrek Forever After.

Angie Stone performed a soulful version of the song on her 2016 album, Covered in Soul.

== Other uses in popular culture ==
The Guess Who's version appears in a 2018 TV commercial for JBL. This version was also used in the 2005 psychological thriller film Stay, directed by Marc Forster. The song is also featured in the 1995 film Now and Then, the 2007 comedy film Superbad and the 2024 Canadian comedy-drama film Universal Language.

Labatt USA used These Eyes for their advertisement for Labatt Blue in 2015.

== Charts ==
=== Weekly charts ===
Chart (1969)	Peak position
Australian Singles (Kent Music Report)	100
Canada Top Singles (RPM)	7
South African Singles Chart	10
US Billboard Hot 100	6

=== Year-end charts ===
Chart (1969)	Peak position
Canada Top Singles (RPM)	30
U.S. Billboard	44
U.S. Cash Box	22

== Certifications ==
Region	Certification	Certified units/sales
Canada (Music Canada)	Platinum	80,000^{‡}
United States (RIAA)	Gold	1,000,000^{^}
^{^} Shipments figures based on certification alone.^{‡} Sales+streaming figures based on certification alone.
