= American Woman (album) =

Studio album by The Guess Who
- Released: January 1970
- Recorded: August – November 1969
- Studios: RCA Mid-America Recording Center, Studio B, Chicago, Illinois
- Genres: Hard rock; psychedelic rock
- Length: 38:17
- Label: RCA Victor
- Producer: Jack Richardson

The Guess Who chronology
Canned Wheat (1969)	American Woman (1970)	Share the Land (1970)

Singles from American Woman
- 1. "No Time" Released: November 1969; 2. "American Woman" / "No Sugar Tonight" Released: March 1970

Professional ratings
Review scores
Source	Rating
Allmusic	4/5 stars
Rolling Stone	(favorable)
The Village Voice	B+

American Woman is the sixth studio album by Canadian rock band the Guess Who, released in January 1970. It was the last to feature lead guitarist Randy Bachman, though he has returned to the band on many occasions since then. The album was one of their most successful releases, receiving Gold certification in the United States.

The album contains several of the group's most popular hits, including the title cut and "No Sugar Tonight", which together reached number one in Canada and the US, and a remake of "No Time", a song the group previously recorded for Canned Wheat. The newer version was released as a single and is the one most familiar to listeners. The album's musical styles consists of psychedelic rock and hard rock.

== Release history ==
In addition to the usual 2 channel stereo version a 4 channel quadraphonic mix was also released by RCA on the 8-track tape format. American Woman was first released on CD by RCA in 1998. Buddha Records released a remastered version in 2000 and included a bonus track, "Got to Find Another Way". In 2017, Iconoclassic Records released a two-disc deluxe version featuring various single edits, outtakes, and the entire 1976 The Way They Were release, which is a collection of tracks recorded in 1970 before Randy Bachman quit the band, intended for the follow-up album to American Woman.

In 2019 the album was reissued again in the UK by Dutton Vocalion on the Super Audio CD format. This disc is a 2 albums on 1 disc compilation which also contains the 1970 Guess Who album Share the Land. The Dutton Vocalion release contains the complete stereo and quad versions of both albums.

== Reception ==
American Woman became the Guess Who's only album to reach the top 10 on the Billboard Pop Albums chart, peaking at number 9 and staying 55 weeks on the charts. The album also reached number one on the Canadian Albums Chart.

== Track listing ==
All songs written by Randy Bachman and Burton Cummings except as noted.

Side one

1. "American Woman" (Bachman, Cummings, Jim Kale, Garry Peterson) – 5:07
2. "No Time" – 3:45
3. "Talisman" – 5:05
4. "No Sugar Tonight/New Mother Nature" – 4:52

Side two

5. "969 (The Oldest Man)" (instrumental) (Bachman) – 2:58
6. "When Friends Fall Out" – 2:58
7. "8:15" – 3:26
8. "Proper Stranger" – 4:47
9. "Humpty's Blues/American Woman (Epilogue)" (Bachman, Cummings, Kale, Peterson) – 6:11

2000 Remaster

10. "Got to Find Another Way" (bonus) – 2:51

2017 Iconoclassic Records deluxe 2-disc re-issue

=== Disc 1: Bonus Tracks ===
10. "American Woman" [single edit] (Bachman, Cummings, Kale, Peterson) – 3:50
11. "No Sugar Tonight" [single edit] – 2:04
12. "Got To Find Another Way" [session outtake] – 2:51
13. "Close Up The Honky Tonks" [session outtake] (Red Simpson) – 3:33
14. "Not to Return" [takes 1&2] – 3:30
15. "Talisman" [take 1] – 4:30
16. "Talisman" [session chatter] – 2:05
17. "No Sugar Tonight" [takes 1&2] – 6:59
18. "American Woman" [take 1] (Bachman, Cummings, Kale, Peterson) – 4:44

=== Disc 2: The Way They Were ===
1. "Silver Bird" – 2:41
2. "Species Hawk" – 3:29
3. "Runnin’ Down the Street" (Kale, Peterson) – 4:16
4. "Miss Frizzy" – 5:08
5. "Palmyra" – 5:50
6. "The Answer" – 3:54
7. "Take the Long Way Home" (Bachman) – 5:43

== Personnel ==
The Guess Who

- Burton Cummings – lead vocals, rhythm guitar, keyboards, flute, harmonica
- Randy Bachman – lead and rhythm guitar, backing vocals
- Jim Kale – bass, backing vocals
- Garry Peterson – drums, backing vocals

Production

- Jack Richardson – producer
- Brian Christian – engineer
- Vic Anesini – 2017 remaster (Iconoclassic Records deluxe 2-disc re-issue)

== Charts ==
Chart (1970)	Peak position
Canada Top Albums/CDs (RPM)	1
US Billboard 200	9

== Certifications ==
Region	Certification	Certified units/sales
Canada (Music Canada)	Platinum	100,000^{^}
United States (RIAA)	Gold	500,000^{^}
^{^} Shipments figures based on certification alone.
