= Garry Peterson =

Canadian rock drummer (born 1945)

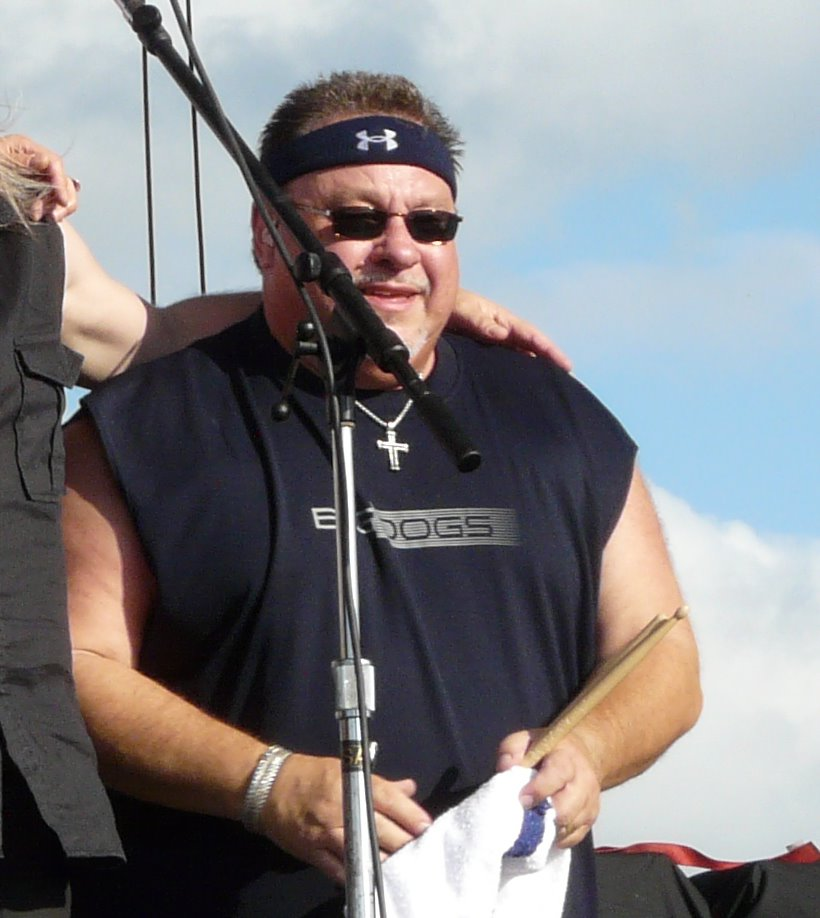
- Peterson in 2008

Background information
- Born: May 26, 1945 (age 81); Winnipeg, Manitoba, Canada
- Genres: Hard rock, psychedelic rock, blues rock, garage rock
- Instrument: Drums
- Years active: 1949–2024
- Formerly of: The Guess Who, Bachman-Turner Overdrive
- Spouse: Kimberley Peterson

Garry Denis Peterson (born May 26, 1945) is a Canadian-American retired drummer. Peterson was originally a "child prodigy" drummer, backing many popular acts in the 1950s, but is best remembered as an original member of the Guess Who. Being the longest-serving member of the group, he was the band's drummer from 1962 to 1975 and appeared with the band for several periodic reunions until 2003.

He later joined Bachman–Turner Overdrive until he was fired a few years later. He subsequently joined an unauthorized Guess Who band put together by original bassist Jim Kale. This version of the band toured and recorded for over 40 years until being stopped in 2024 by lawsuits from Burton Cummings and Randy Bachman.

== Career ==
=== Early career: 1949–1958 ===
He was born in Winnipeg, and his father, Ferdie Peterson (who was also a drummer) got him to start playing the drums at age two, and professionally when he was four years old. In 1950, when he was five, he played drums for Peggy Lee at the Chicago Theatre. At nine years old, he joined the American Federation of Musicians. Garry was a child prodigy drummer, and backed Lionel Hampton, the Four Lands, Ames Brothers, and the Andrews Sisters. His influences are Ringo Starr, David Garibaldi, Buddy Rich, and Gene Krupa. He is also inspired by jazz and classical music, and played in the Winnipeg Symphony Orchestra for one season.

=== The Guess Who: 1958–1975 ===
Peterson met Randy Bachman in junior high school, where they were both on their baseball team. They, with another friend, formed the band the Embers in 1958. Garry and Randy Bachman from the band met Chad Allan, Bob Ashley, and Jim Kale from Al & the Silvertones who were the band's "biggest rivals" and became Chad Allan and the Reflections. Early photos of the feature Peterson playing the saxophone.

They later renamed the band to the Guess Who and added Burton Cummings as their keyboardist and lead singer. The Guess Who charted fourteen Top 40 singles in the United States and more than thirty in Canada. These songs include "American Woman", "These Eyes", "Laughing", "No Sugar Tonight/New Mother Nature", and "No Time".

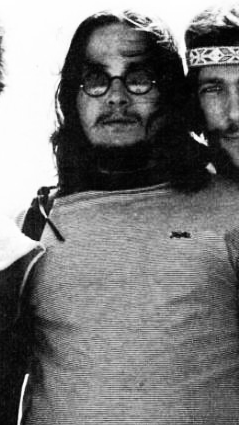
Peterson in 1970

Peterson, Cummings and Bill Wallace all played on Rick Neufeld's 1974 album Prairie Dog. Peterson and Cummings toured in the original Guess Who band until 1975.

=== Post-Guess Who: 1975–1982 ===
When the Guess Who stopped in 1975, Garry formed an unsuccessful band with Mandala lead singer Roy Kenner called Delphia. He then stepped away from music for a few years, working jobs including a night clerk in his father-in-law's hotel and an insurance salesman.

From 1979 to 1983, Peterson played in Burton Cummings' backing band for his solo performances. Between 1981 and 1982, he played drums on albums for Richard Stepp, Herman van Veen, and Nancy Nash.

=== Bachman–Turner Overdrive: 1983–1986 ===
He backed Burton Cummings for a while, until 1983, when he decided to leave Cummings to join Randy Bachman in Bachman–Turner Overdrive. Peterson plays on their 1984 Bachman–Turner Overdrive album. Although he was not a member at the time, Peterson played percussion, drums and backing vocals on BTO's first album, also called Bachman–Turner Overdrive from 1973, and also performed congas, drums and other percussive instrument on Randy Bachman's solo album Axe in 1970.

Peterson was kicked off of the band's tour after breaking his ankle in an Ice hockey accident. Peterson had received a phone call from Tim Bachman saying that the band "no longer required" him. Peterson's booting from BTO was an especially dark time for him, as he sold his home and art collections to pay for taxes since he was receiving no income, and Burton Cummings never forgave him for ditching him to go with Bachman.

=== Unauthorized Guess Who band and lawsuit: 1987–present ===
A year after leaving Bachman–Turner Overdrive, he joined a separate unauthorized band formed by Jim Kale calling themselves the Guess Who. Since then, he had toured with Kale, but was the sole original member in the group from Kale retiring in 2016 until his version of the band ended in September 2024. The last time all four original Guess Who members performed together was at the closing ceremonies of the Pan American Games at Winnipeg Stadium on August 8, 1999. A 2003 performance at the Molson Canadian Rocks for Toronto SARS benefit concert with a capacity of 450,000 is now recognised at the largest outdoor ticketed event in Canadian history.

From 2023 onward, Bachman and Burton Cummings had engaged in legal battles with the new Guess Who featuring Garry Peterson. These battles include a cease and desist order and accusations of false advertising. As a result of a court agreement, Peterson’s Guess Who could not perform songs written or co-written by Cummings or Bachman.

Peterson was the only original Guess Who member touring with the new version currently from 2016, but in recent years was on occasion absent from concerts because of health reasons, causing those gigs to contain no original members on stage, with the oldest serving member in the band on stage only dating back to 2008. The U.S. Patent and Trademark Office records show that since 2006, Peterson and Kale co-owned the rights to the "Guess Who" name only during live performances and not for studio releases. Nevertheless, the group had released several studio albums, which failed to chart and received generally negative reviews.

The group had cancelled all tour dates and shut down their website in April 2024. Cummings and Bachman won the long running Guess Who lawsuit in September 2024, ending Kale and Peterson's version of the Guess Who.

== Personal life ==
Born in Canada, Peterson now lives in the United States, Greensboro, North Carolina, with his wife Kimberly Ann Peterson. He and Kimberly met at the Greensboro Coliseum Complex when Bachman–Turner Overdrive were playing there. Peterson has dual citizenship of Canada and the United States. He has leg problems, and sometimes uses a wheelchair or a mobility scooter when having to walk long distances.

== Awards ==
Peterson has received many honours as a part of the Guess Who. These include an induction into the Canadian Music Hall of Fame (1987), induction into the Canada's Walk of Fame (1999), and receiving the Governor General's Performing Arts Award for Lifetime Artistic Achievement for their contributions to popular music in Canada (2002).

== Discography ==
=== The Guess Who ===
The Guess Who discography

=== Randy Bachman ===
Year	Album
1970	Axe

=== Bachman–Turner Overdrive ===
Year	Album
1973	Bachman–Turner Overdrive
1984	Bachman–Turner Overdrive
1986	Live Live Live
1994	Best of Bachman–Turner Overdrive Live

=== Burton Cummings ===
Year	Album
1980	Woman Love
1981	Sweet Sweet
1984	Heart

=== Richard Stepp ===
Year	Album
1981	Richard Stepp

=== Herman van Veen ===
Year	Album
1982	Voor Kinderen

=== Nancy Nash ===
Year	Album
1982	Letting Go
