= Jack Richardson (music producer) =

Canadian record producer (1929–2011)

- Born: 23 July 1929; Toronto, Ontario, Canada
- Died: 13 May 2011 (aged 81); London, Ontario, Canada
- Occupation: Record producer
- Known for: Producer for the Guess Who; Jack Richardson Music Awards

Jack Arnold Richardson CM (23 July 1929 – 13 May 2011) was a Canadian Juno Award-nominated record producer and Order of Canada recipient. He is perhaps best known for producing the biggest hit records from The Guess Who from 1969 to 1975. He was part of the faculty at Fanshawe College in London, Ontario as an educator in the Music Industry Arts program for almost 20 years, as well as at the Harris Institute for the Arts in Toronto, Ontario. His son is record producer Garth Richardson.

== Biography ==
Richardson was born in Toronto, Ontario, and had early musical training playing in various school bands. By 1949 he was playing professionally in "The Westernaires" who had a regular radio program. In 1958 he was working as an account executive for McCann-Erickson, a firm that produced a regular television program and in the mid-1960s Richardson and three others from this firm decided to form their own production company, Nimbus 9. Initially, audio recording was only one aspect of Nimbus 9, which was formed to provide multi-media production to their clients. Within a brief period of time, however, audio recording became the single focus of operations.

In 1968, Richardson approached the Canadian branch of the Coca-Cola company with an idea to produce and market a long-playing album through a type of bottle-cap reimbursement scheme. On one side of the release were The Guess Who, and on the flip-side, a group from Ottawa, Ontario called The Staccatos (later to become the Five Man Electrical Band). Both of these groups were already well known within Canada: The Guess Who were featured as the house band on the weekly CBC TV show Let's Go and had ten top 40 hits in Canada between 1965 and 1967, while The Staccatos had reached the Canadian top 40 twice in that same period of time. The split album the two groups recorded, A Wild Pair, could only be obtained by sending ten Coca-Cola bottle cap liners and $1 (for shipping expenses) to Coca-Cola. Guess Who guitarist Randy Bachman estimates that the album sold enough units to qualify for gold record status in Canada; however, no certification figures are available as the LP was not distributed through normal retail channels.

After the success of A Wild Pair, Richardson mortgaged his own home to obtain funds to produce an album with The Guess Who. He took the group to Phil Ramone's A&R Recording studio in New York City, and produced the1968 Wheatfield Soul album, which spawned an international hit, "These Eyes".

Richardson and The Guess Who had many more hits in the next few years (including the US and Canadian #1 single "American Woman"), and as Richardson's reputation as a producer grew, so did his list of famous clients. From the early 1970s on, Richardson produced some of the biggest selling records of the era: Alice Cooper's Love It to Death, The Irish Rovers' #1 hit "Wasn't That A Party", Bob Seger's "Night Moves", Badfinger, Moxy, Poco, Max Webster and many others. This was in addition to the hits he was producing for The Guess Who, who were for a time (1970) the best selling rock group in the world.

From 1984 to 1986, Richardson was the music producer for the television show, Party with the Rovers (The Irish Rovers) for Global TV in association with Ulster TV in Ireland.

Later, Richardson decided on another career change and became a professor in the Music Industry Arts (MIA) program at Fanshawe College in London, Ontario, until he retired from teaching in 2007.

In 1998, Richardson was awarded the Special Achievement Award at the SOCAN Awards in Toronto.

A non-profit organisation and associated award was started in 2005 as the Jack Richardson Music Awards. The award was given to up-and-coming musical acts and artists from London in a variety of categories. In 2018, the nonprofit and its awards were renamed the Forest City London Music Awards.

When Jack Richardson died at the age of 81, The Guess Who frontman Burton Cummings paid tribute on his blog by writing: "He was a great friend... bright, talented and funny. He taught me infinite amounts of about producing and arranging."

== Selected discography ==
Among Richardson's producer credits are the following:

- The Guess Who - Wheatfield Soul, Canned Wheat, American Woman
- FLICKER - Everybody's Everyday
- The Irish Rovers - Wasn't That A Party, Grandma Got Run Over by a Reindeer
- Bob Seger - Night Moves
- Alice Cooper - Love It to Death (co-producer with Bob Ezrin), Muscle of Love (co-producer with Jack Douglas)
- Kim Mitchell - Kim Mitchell (co-producer with Mitchell)
- Manowar - Hail to England, Sign of the Hammer
- Max Webster - Universal Juveniles
- Starz - Coliseum Rock
- Madcats - Streetgame
- Moxy - Moxy II
- Poco - A Good Feelin' to Know, Crazy Eyes, Seven
- Badfinger - Say No More
- Sword - Sweet Dreams
- Dan Schafer- A Day Without You, Dear (RCA US & Canada single)
- Tufano & Giammarese - Dennis Tufano and Carl Giammarese - The Tufano & Giammarese Band, Ode (1975)

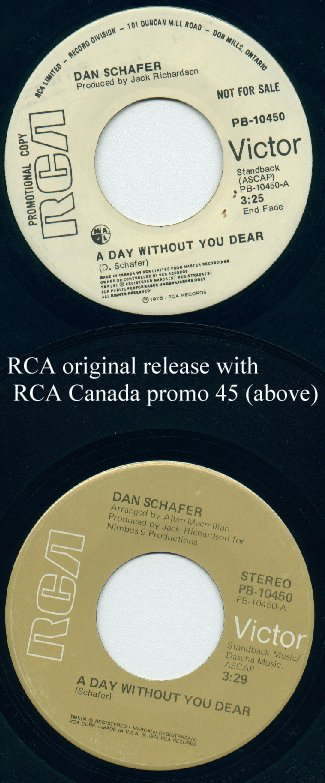
RCA Victor Canadian promo & US release single 1976

== See also ==
- Category:Albums produced by Jack Richardson (record producer)
