= The Guess Who =

Canadian rock band

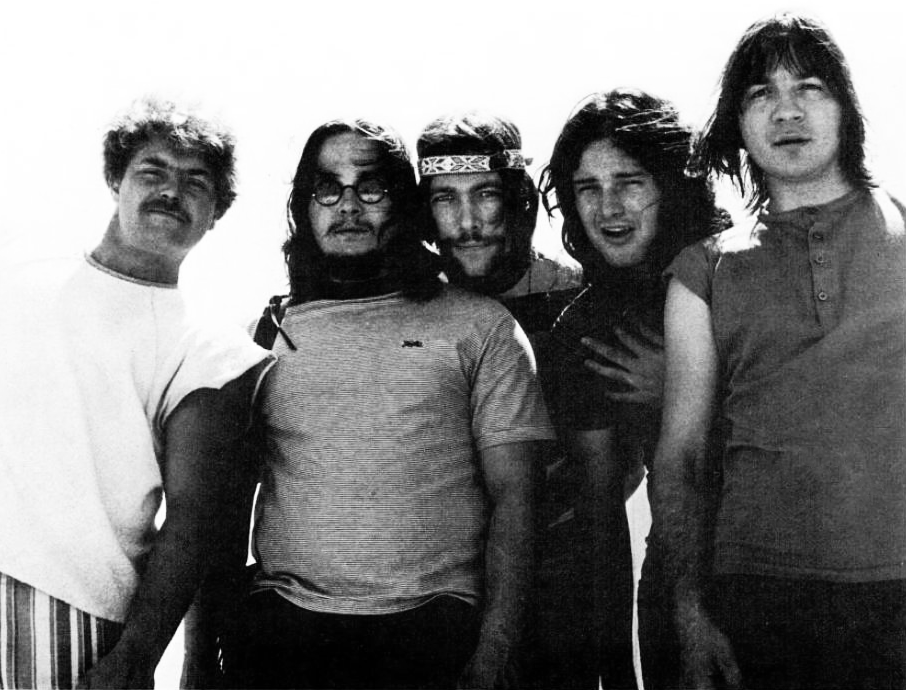
- The Guess Who in 1970. From left to right: Kurt Winter, Garry Peterson, Greg Leskiw, Burton Cummings, and Jim Kale.

Background information
- Also known as: Al & the Silvertones (1958–1962); Chad Allan & the Reflections (1962–1963); Chad Allan & the Expressions (1963-1965); Guess Who? (1965–1966); The Guess Who? (1966–1969)
- Origin: Winnipeg, Manitoba, Canada
- Genres: Hard rock; psychedelic rock; blues rock; garage rock
- Years active: 1958–1975; 1979; 1983; 1999–2003; 2025–present (Note: An unauthorized version of the band led by bassist Jim Kale and drummer Garry Peterson was active from 1978 to 2024.)
- Labels: Nimbus 9; RCA Victor
- Members: Randy Bachman; Burton Cummings
- Past members: Jim Kale; Garry Peterson; Chad Allan; Bob Ashley; Bruce Decker; Kurt Winter; Greg Leskiw; Donnie McDougall; Bill Wallace; Dale Russell; Domenic Troiano; See also List of the Guess Who members
- Website: theguesswho.com

The Guess Who is a Canadian rock band formed in Winnipeg, Manitoba, in 1958. The band found their greatest success from 1969 to 1972, with hit songs including "American Woman", "These Eyes", "No Time", "No Sugar Tonight", "Laughing", "Share the Land" and "Clap for the Wolfman".

During their most successful period, the Guess Who released eleven studio albums, all of which reached the charts in Canada and the United States. Their 1970 album American Woman reached number 1 in Canada and the United States, while five other albums reached the top ten in Canada. The Guess Who charted fourteen Top-40 singles in the United States, and more than thirty in Canada.

The Guess Who officially disbanded in 1975, though several periodic reunions took place over the years. Former bassist Jim Kale began touring and recording under the Guess Who name in 1977, sometimes with other former members but often performing without any original band members on stage. After a lengthy legal dispute, the band's primary songwriters, guitarist Randy Bachman and frontman Burton Cummings, regained control of the Guess Who name in a 2024 settlement, and toured in 2026 with a new lineup.

== History ==
=== Predecessor groups (1958–1965) ===
In 1958, Winnipeg singer and guitarist Chad Allan formed a local rock band called Al and the Silvertones. After several lineup changes, the band stabilized in 1962 under the name Chad Allan and the Reflections, which included Allan and keyboardist Bob Ashley, plus future Guess Who mainstays Randy Bachman on guitar, Jim Kale on bass, and Garry Peterson on drums.

Chad Allan and the Reflections released their first single, "Tribute To Buddy Holly", on Canadian-American Records in 1962. They then signed with Quality Records and released several singles in 1963–1964, which gained some regional notice around Winnipeg but made little impact in the rest of Canada. One single was credited, perhaps mistakenly, to Bob Ashley and the Reflections.

After an American group called the Reflections released the 1964 hit single "(Just Like) Romeo and Juliet", the group changed its name to Chad Allan and the Expressions. Under this new name, they released the garage rock album Shakin' All Over in January 1965. That album's single, "Shakin' All Over", earlier recorded by Johnny Kidd & the Pirates, was the band's first major hit, reaching no. 1 in Canada, no. 22 in the United States, and no. 27 in Australia. Their Canadian label, Quality Records, disguised the single by crediting it to Guess Who?, as a publicity stunt to generate speculation that it was by a more famous British Invasion band working incognito.

After Quality Records revealed the band to be Chad Allan and the Expressions, disc jockeys continued to announce the group as Guess Who?, effectively forcing the band to accept the new name. They released their second album, Hey Ho (What You Do to Me!) in late 1965; it was credited to Chad Allan and the Expressions with "Guess Who?" displayed prominently on the cover.

=== Early years (1965–1968) ===
Keyboardist Bob Ashley left the band in January 1966 because of the rigors of touring. He was replaced by 18-year-old Burton Cummings (formerly of Winnipeg group the Deverons) who also took on lead vocal duties in conjunction with Chad Allan as the band formally renamed itself as the Guess Who? (The question mark would be dropped later.) Just a few months later, Allan departed; he returned to college and then became a media personality with the CBC. This left Cummings as the sole lead singer. After Allan's departure in 1966, guitarist Bruce Decker, a former bandmate of Cummings in the Deverons, joined for a few months.

The first album under the Guess Who name, It's Time, was released in 1966, with Cummings on vocals and keyboards, Bachman on guitar, Kale on bass, and Peterson on drums. Decker, despite being pictured on the cover of the album, did not participate in the recording. Conversely, some contributions by Allan (recorded before he left the group) can be heard on the album, though he is not credited or pictured on the album cover. Many of the songs were written by Randy Bachman.

The Guess Who continued to release singles that were moderately successful in Canada, and "His Girl" entered the UK charts in 1967. The band travelled to the United Kingdom to promote the single, but this was a financial mistake as the song quickly dropped off the charts. They were unable to book shows or obtain work visas while in the UK, and returned to Canada heavily in debt. Later in 1967, the Guess Who were hired as the house band for the CBC Radio show The Swingers, and as the house band for the CBC Television program Let's Go, which was hosted by their former bandmate Chad Allan. They initially performed hit singles by other artists, but the CBC producers encouraged them to develop more of their own music as well. This gave the Guess Who greater exposure in Canada and financial stability for the next two years.

After seeing the Guess Who on Let's Go, record producer and sales executive Jack Richardson contacted the band about participating in an advertising project for Coca-Cola. This project became a split album titled A Wild Pair with Ottawa band the Staccatos (themselves soon to renamed Five Man Electrical Band). The album could be purchased only by mail-order from Coca-Cola. Richardson served as the Guess Who's producer until the band's breakup in 1975, and they were managed during that entire period by Don Hunter.

=== American Woman era (1968–1970) ===
Richardson signed the Guess Who to his Nimbus 9 label and production company, and personally financed the recording of a new album in late 1968. The band was also signed to RCA for distribution outside of Canada. The Guess Who transitioned to a more mature pop-rock sound with soul and jazz influences. Their second studio album Wheatfield Soul was released in early 1969 and achieved success in both Canada and the United States. The single "These Eyes" reached the top ten in the United States and became a gold record with sales of more than one million copies. Wheatfield Soul would prove to be a breakthrough not only for The Guess Who, but for Canadian music in general in the United States, and within a year, multiple Canadian acts had broken through to chart in the United States, where American and British acts had up until then dominated the charts. The follow-up album Canned Wheat was released in September 1969 and featured the double-sided hit singles "Laughing" and "Undun".

For their third studio album, the band adopted more hard-rock influences. American Woman was released in January 1970 and became a Billboard Top 10 hit. It was their first album to top the Canadian albums chart, and their first to reach the top ten on the American Billboard album chart. The title track, written by Bachman and Cummings (although all four original members are credited), reached number 1 in both countries, and was also a substantial hit in the United Kingdom. This made the Guess Who the first Canadian band to achieve a chart-topping single in the United States during Billboard's Hot 100 era (Canadian doo-wop group The Crew Cuts had a number one single in 1954 before the Hot 100 was instituted). "No Time" and "No Sugar Tonight/New Mother Nature" also reached high on the singles charts in both Canada and the United States.

=== Continued success (1970–1974) ===
While American Woman became a success in the early months of 1970, Bachman recorded an all-instrumental solo album titled Axe with Peterson on drums. The Guess Who began recording a follow-up to American Woman, completing seven tracks (which were withheld and not released until 1976 under the title The Way They Were.)

Bachman took a break from touring with the Guess Who due to illness, with American guitarist Bobby Sabellico filling in temporarily. Bachman played a final show with the band and exited the band in May 1970; his relations with Cummings had deteriorated and his recent conversion to Mormonism caused dissatisfaction with the band's rock 'n' roll lifestyle. Bachman later formed the successful hard-rock band Bachman–Turner Overdrive, which remains active into the 2020s.

Indicating a move into more intricate arrangements and vocal harmonies, while shooting for album rock radio, the Guess Who replaced Bachman with two guitarists from the Winnipeg rock scene: Kurt Winter from the band Brother, and Greg Leskiw from the band Wild Rice. Winter brought some songs from his previous band and became one of the Guess Who's primary songwriters. Leskiw occasionally contributed lead vocals. On July 17, 1970, the band was invited to perform at the White House for U.S. President Richard Nixon's family and guests, but they were asked not to play "American Woman" due to its apparent criticism of the United States. However, in 2020, Cummings admitted the song isn't a criticism of America. Additionally, he said the White House never asked them to drop the song. That whole urban legend was created by the group's manager as a publicity stunt.

The expanded lineup quickly recorded the album Share the Land, which was released in late 1970 and became another substantial hit in both Canada and the United States. Songs from the albums Wheatfield Soul through Share the Land were compiled for the album The Best of The Guess Who, which became another successful release in both countries in 1971.

The band's commercial fortunes and chart performance then declined in the United States, perhaps due to an inability to be taken seriously by the fans of album rock radio, though they remained very successful in their native Canada. They released the albums So Long, Bannatyne in mid-1971, and Rockin' in early 1972. Both albums displayed more progressive and experimental elements. Shortly after the release of Rockin', Leskiw suddenly left the band in the middle of a US tour. Leskiw was replaced on short notice by guitarist/singer Donnie McDougall, a veteran of the Winnipeg rock scene who had most recently played with the Vancouver-based Mother Tucker's Yellow Duck. With McDougall on board, the band recorded the album Live at the Paramount at the Paramount Theatre in Seattle in May 1972; it was released in August and included some songs that had not appeared on previous studio albums.

Just two months after McDougall joined the Guess Who in 1972, founding bassist Jim Kale was dismissed from the band; he then joined Vancouver band Scrubbaloe Caine who released one album and achieved some Canadian hit singles in the mid-1970s. Kale subsequently formed and played with the Jim Kale Band, followed by the Ripple Brothers, before falling on hard times later in the decade. The Guess Who replaced Kale with Bill Wallace, who had played with Kurt Winter in their early Winnipeg band Brother. This lineup released the albums Artificial Paradise in early 1973, #10 in late 1973 (the title of which represented their number of original albums up to that point), and Road Food in early 1974. Road Food included the single "Clap for the Wolfman", which was a hit in both Canada and the United States, and the band's first top ten American single since 1970. The novelty song was a tribute to disc jockey Wolfman Jack, who lent his voice to the recording.

=== Breakup of the Guess Who (1974–1975) ===
For undisclosed reasons, guitarists Winter and McDougall were dismissed from the band in June 1974. They were replaced by a single guitarist, Domenic Troiano, who had founded the successful Canadian band Bush and had also served briefly with James Gang. Having grown up in Toronto, Troiano was the first member of The Guess Who not to hail from Winnipeg. He had also collaborated with an earlier version of the Guess Who on an aborted movie soundtrack in 1970 and had played on Bachman's album Axe that year. The lineup of Cummings, Troiano, Wallace, and Peterson released the albums Flavours in late 1974 and Power in the Music in mid-1975. Due to Troiano's songwriting influence, these albums moved toward jazz rock; Cummings was unhappy with the stylistic change and the group disbanded in October 1975.

Cummings then embarked on a lengthy solo career. Troiano also enjoyed a solo career until his death in 2005. Gary Peterson teamed with Toronto singer and ex-Domenic Troiano associate Roy Kenner and Bobby Sabellico in an R&B band, Delphia, in 1979. The group went unsigned and left no recordings. Peterson then worked as a night clerk in his father-in-law's hotel and as an insurance salesman to make ends meet before eventually making his way back to music. He played drums in the backup band accompanying Cummings from 1979 through 1983, followed by Bachman-Turner Overdrive from 1984 through 1986.

=== Post-breakup activities and classic lineup reunions (1979–2003) ===
Members of the classic-era Guess Who reunited a number of times over the years, the first being when Cummings, Bachman, Peterson, and late-classic-era bassist Wallace reformed for a CBC television special in November 1979. This was followed by a short tour of notable Canadian cultural venues in 1983, resulting in the live album Together Again! (known as The Best of The Guess Who – Live! in the United States). In May 1997, with their hometown of Winnipeg facing severe floods, Cummings and Bachman reunited for a fundraiser for disaster relief, organized by Canadian actor Tom Jackson. At the request of the Premier of Manitoba, Cummings, Bachman, Kale and Peterson appeared together at the closing ceremonies of the Pan American Games at Winnipeg Stadium on August 8, 1999. The band reportedly received $250,000 Canadian dollars to do so. This inspired plans for a reunion tour, though Kale dropped out. Another lineup featuring classic-era members Cummings, Bachman, Peterson, McDougall, and Wallace engaged in a lengthy reunion tour from 2000 to 2003, including playing the halftime show at the 2000 Grey Cup. On July 30, 2003, this lineup performed before an estimated audience of 450,000 at the Molson Canadian Rocks for Toronto benefit concert. The show was the largest outdoor ticketed event in Canadian history. Since 2003, Bachman and Cummings have collaborated occasionally under the name Bachman-Cummings.

=== Legal disputes over Jim Kale's use of "The Guess Who" name (1978–2024) ===
Former bassist Jim Kale, who left the band in 1972, approached Cummings for permission to use the Guess Who name for a single reunion concert promoted by the CBC in 1978. While he was granted permission to use the name for the concert, Kale went beyond what was allowed and instead used the name for a new lineup that gigged regularly. This group released two albums under the Guess Who name in 1978 and 1981, with Kale, Donnie McDougall and Kurt Winter as the "classic" members present.

In 1987, Kale discovered that the name the Guess Who had never been trademarked, and filed registration applications with the United States trademark office for the band name, unbeknownst to the other original members. Kale used his newly registered mark to continue performing in the United States under the Guess Who moniker. Because he owned the name, Kale essentially leased the rights to the rest of the group for the 2000-2003 "Running Back Through Canada" tour, earning a 20% share despite not performing in the lineup. After the tour and subsequent audio and video releases, Kale was joined by drummer Gary Peterson in a partnership from 2006 to 2024, continuing to lead a group under The Guess Who name. Kale intermittently retired on several occasions until 2016, during which he continued to hire musicians with no historic connection to the band to perform as the Guess Who. Albums from Kale's version of the Guess Who were not released through a major label, did not chart and received mostly unfavorable reviews. While Peterson often appeared in Kale's Guess Who lineup, there were also instances when the band performed without any original members present.

Both Cummings and Bachman were highly critical of Kale and Peterson's version of the Guess Who, calling it "the fake Guess Who", or "Kale's Klones" and calling the band's concerts "fake bullshit shows". Kale referred to his own potential iteration of the group as "a band of trained monkeys". The dispute has been compared to John Fogerty's dispute with his former bandmates over the use of the name Creedence Clearwater Revisited.

Early in 2023, Bachman and Cummings sent multiple cease-and-desist letters to the Kale/Peterson-led nostalgia band, accusing them of misleading the public. In October 2023, after having received no response to the letters, Bachman and Cummings launched a "false advertising" lawsuit against Kale and Peterson, claiming that the band has used the Guess Who name, photos of Bachman and Cummings, and original recordings, "to give the false impression that Plaintiffs are performing as part of the cover band". Bachman and Cummings sought $20 million in damages. A hearing pertaining to the lawsuit and Kale's and Peterson's counterclaims was scheduled for January 2024.

In April 2024, a federal judge denied Kale and Peterson's motion to dismiss the Bachman and Cummings suit. That same month, Cummings, through his music publishing company, took the highly unusual step of terminating his license agreement with BMI so that his catalog would be removed from BMI's blanket license agreements with music venues. With this legal maneuver, not only would any musician publicly performing a Cummings-authored Guess Who song be liable for monetary damages, so would the owners of any venue where the song was performed. Following this action, the band was unable to perform most of the group's biggest hits, as Cummings authored or co-authored the vast majority of them including "These Eyes", "American Woman", "No Time", "Share the Land", and many others. The group's concerts were immediately canceled and the website for Kale and Peterson's Guess Who was shuttered in July 2024, effectively bringing an end to this version of the band.

In September 2024, Bachman and Cummings announced that they had gained control of the Guess Who name in an out-of-court settlement.

=== Return of the Guess Who under Bachman and Cummings' leadership (2025–present) ===
In June 2025, Bachman and Cummings announced they would reform the Guess Who for the "Taking It Back" tour in 2026. In November of that year, the band's lineup was revealed to consist of Bachman and Cummings, backed by drummer Sean Fitzsimons, bassist Jeff Jones, percussionist and vocalist Nick Sinopoli, and guitarists Tim Bovaconti and Joe Augello, some of whom previously served as backing musicians in Cummings' solo band the Carpet Frogs.

== Honours ==
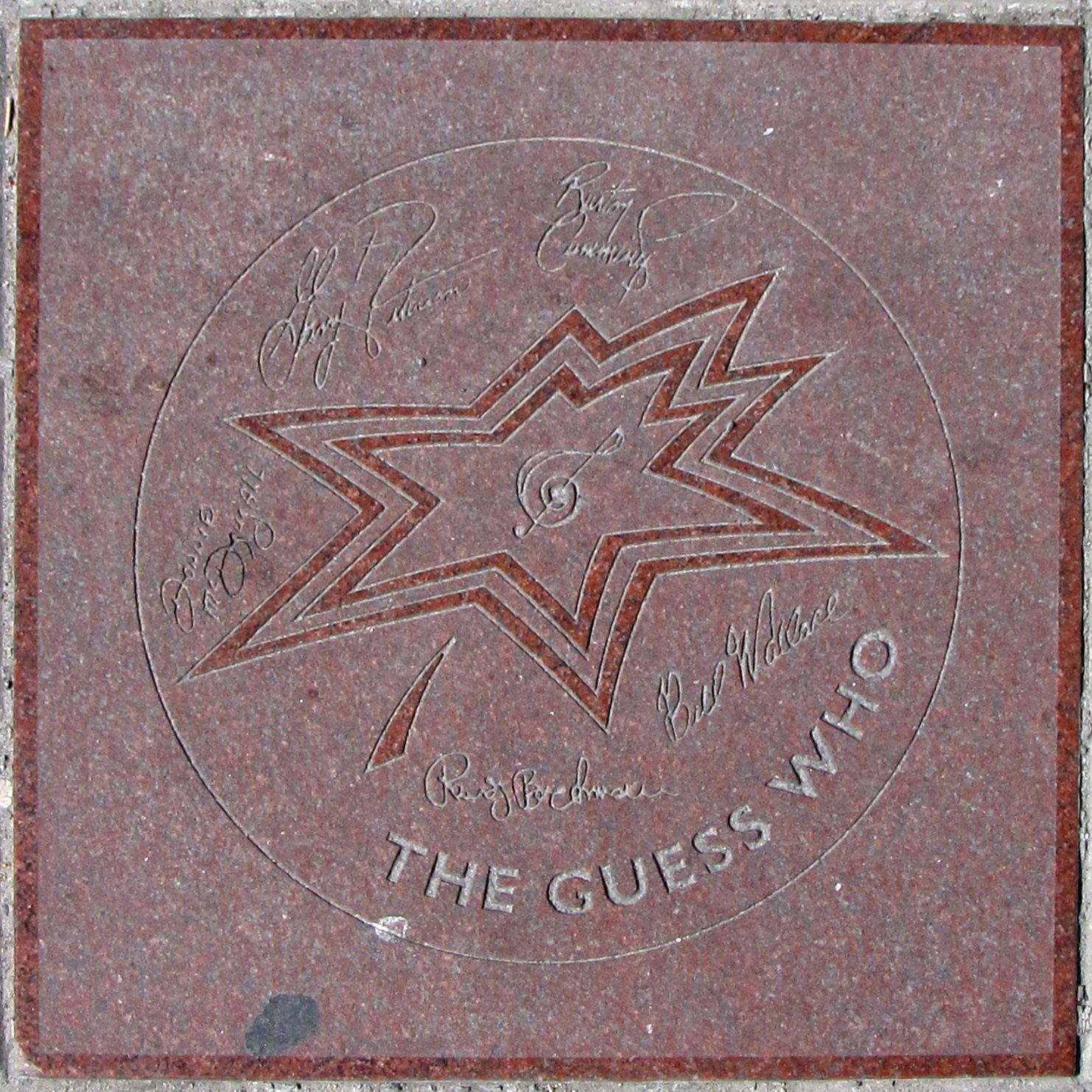
The band's star on Canada's Walk of Fame. Signatures, from top left clockwise: Garry Peterson, Burton Cummings, Bill Wallace, Randy Bachman and Donnie McDougall.

The Guess Who's original members, Cummings, Bachman, Kale and Peterson, were inducted into the Canadian Music Hall of Fame in 1987. In 2001, the original members of the Guess Who received honorary doctorates from Brandon University. For Cummings, this was a special honour because he had not graduated from high school. That same year, the group was inducted into Canada's Walk of Fame. The signatures of then-current band members Bachman, Cummings, McDougall, Peterson, and Wallace are engraved into the commemorative stone. In 2002, the then-current remaining performing original members, Bachman, Cummings, McDougall, Peterson, and Wallace received the Governor General's Performing Arts Award for Lifetime Artistic Achievement for their contributions to popular music in Canada. In 2018, several master tapes of the band's recordings, possibly including unreleased material, were donated to the St. Vital Museum in Winnipeg.

== Members ==
Current members

- Randy Bachman – lead guitar, backing vocals (1960–1970, 1979, 1983, 1999–2003, 2025–present)
- Burton Cummings - lead vocals, keyboards, rhythm guitar, flute, harmonica (1966–1975, 1979, 1983, 1999–2003, 2025–present)

Former members (Note: The timeline does not include musicians who featured in Kale and Peterson's version of the band from 1978 to 2024)

- Chad Allan – lead vocals, rhythm guitar (1958–1966)
- Bob Ashley – keyboards, backing vocals (1962–1965)
- Jim Kale – bass, backing vocals (1962–1972, 1983, 1999–2000)
- Garry Peterson – drums, percussion, backing vocals (1962–1975, 1979, 1983, 1999–2003)
- Bruce Decker – rhythm guitar (1966)
- Kurt Winter – lead and rhythm guitar, backing vocals (1970–1974)
- Greg Leskiw – lead and rhythm guitar, vocals (1970–1972)
- Donnie McDougall – lead and rhythm guitar, vocals (1972–1974, 2000-2003)
- Bill Wallace – bass, vocals (1972–1975, 1979, 2000–2003)
- Domenic Troiano – lead and rhythm guitars, backing vocals (1974–1975)

== Discography ==
=== Studio albums ===
==== Official albums ====
- Shakin' All Over (1965) (as Chad Allan & The Expressions)
- Hey Ho (What You Do to Me!) (1965) (as Chad Allan & The Expressions)
- It's Time (1966) (as The Guess Who?)
- A Wild Pair (with The Staccatos) (1968) (as The Guess Who?)
- Wheatfield Soul (1969)
- Canned Wheat (1969)
- American Woman (1970)
- Share the Land (1970)
- So Long, Bannatyne (1971)
- Rockin' (1972)
- Artificial Paradise (1973)
- #10 (1973)
- Road Food (1974)
- Flavours (1974)
- Power in the Music (1975)

=== Live albums ===
- Live at the Paramount (1972)
- Together Again (1984)
- Running Back Thru Canada (2000)

== Filmography ==
- 1983: Together Again (live concert with interviews)
- 2002: Running Back Thru Canada (live with bonus tracks)
- 2003: Molson Canadian Rocks for Toronto (two tracks only)
- 2004: Running Back Thru Canada DVD

== See also ==
- List of bands from Canada

== Notes ==
Preceded by	Grey Cup Halftime Show; 2000	Succeeded by Sass Jordan and Michel Pagliaro
