= Randy Bachman =

Canadian musician (born 1943)

Randy Bachman OC OM FRCMT(hon)
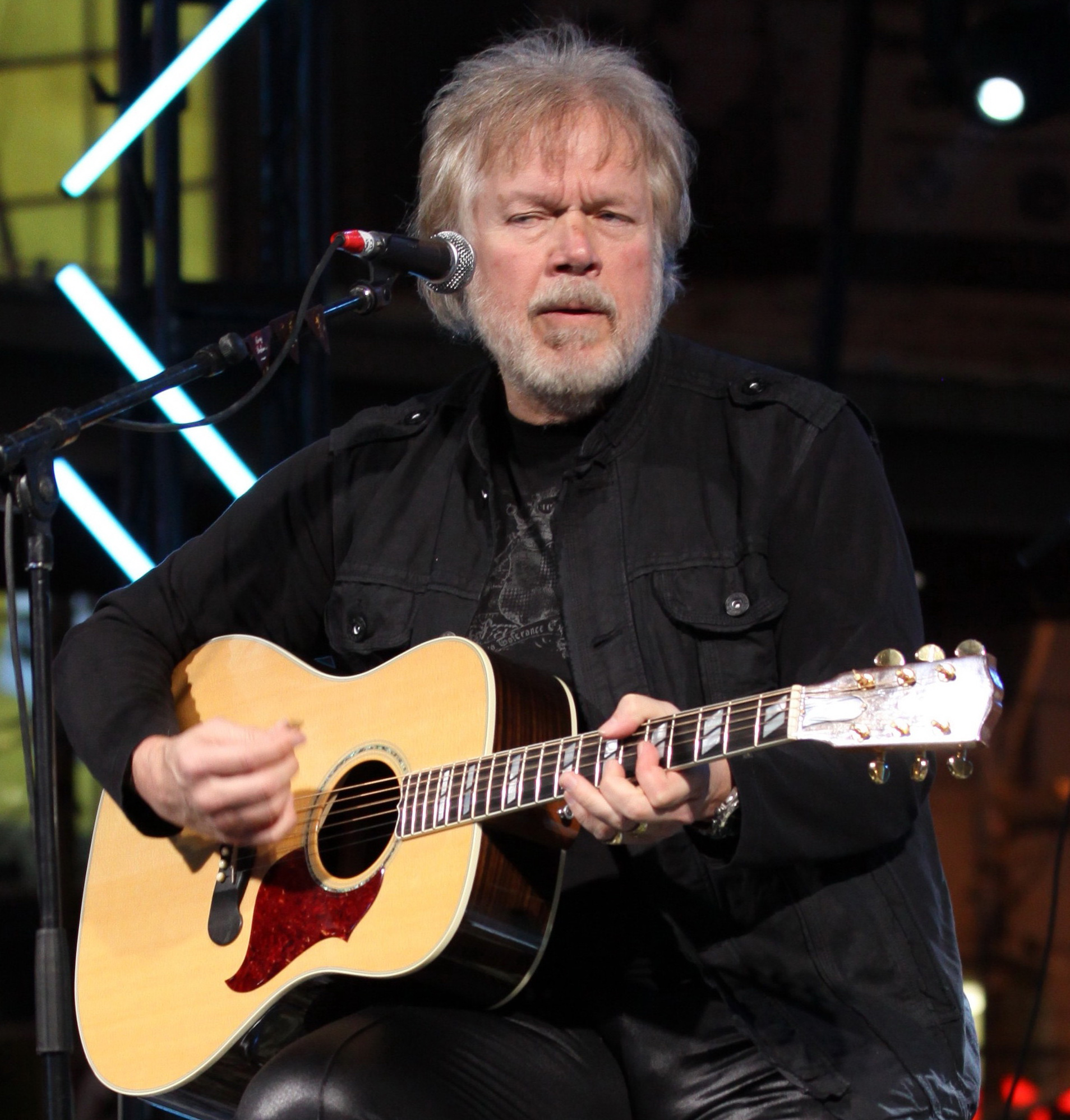
- Bachman in concert in 2009

Background information
- Born: Randolph Charles Bachman; September 27, 1943 (age 83); Winnipeg, Manitoba, Canada
- Genre: Rock
- Occupations: Musician; songwriter; radio personality
- Instruments: Guitar; vocals
- Years active: 1960–present
- Member of: The Guess Who; Bachman-Turner Overdrive
- Website: randybachman.com

Randolph Charles Bachman (/ˈbækmən/ BAK-mən; born September 27, 1943) is a Canadian guitarist, singer, and songwriter. He was a founding member of the bands the Guess Who and Bachman–Turner Overdrive. He was the writer and singer of several hit rock songs, including, "Takin' Care of Business", and "You Ain't Seen Nothing Yet". Bachman also recorded as a solo artist and was part of a number of short-lived bands such as Brave Belt, Union and Ironhorse. He was a national radio personality on CBC Radio, hosting the weekly music show, Vinyl Tap. Bachman was inducted into the Musicians Hall of Fame and Museum in 2016.

== Early life and education ==
Born in Winnipeg, Manitoba, to Karl (Charlie) Bachman and Anne (Nancy) Dobrinsky, Bachman is of half-German Canadian and half-Ukrainian Canadian descent. At age three, he won a singing contest on CKY's King of the Saddle programme and at age five he had started studying the violin in the Royal Toronto Conservatory system. He studied violin until the age of 12 when he grew dissatisfied with the structured lessons. While he could not read music, he found that he could play anything if he heard it once; he referred to this skill as "phonographic memory".

At age 15, Bachman saw Elvis Presley play on Tommy Dorsey's television show and the sight of the guitar around Presley's neck inspired him. He learned three chords from his cousin, then started practising on a modified Hawaiian Dobro. At age 16, Bachman met Lenny Breau and during the next two years Breau taught Bachman finger picking. Breau also introduced him to Chet Atkins' music.

In 1959, Bachman bought a ticket to see Les Paul in concert at a Winnipeg supper club but could not get in as he was too young. He instead helped Paul set up before the show and also helped him reload everything into the car after the show. Still a budding guitarist at this point, Bachman asked Paul if he could teach him a guitar lick; Paul ended up teaching his version of "How High the Moon".

He was initially a good student at school until he took up the guitar, when he focused on that instrument to the exclusion of his education. He passed Grade 9 at Edmund Partridge Junior High School, but repeated both the 10th and 11th grades, initially at West Kildonan Collegiate. In his second year of Grade 11, he was placed in a class of students who mostly either "flunked or dropped out and came back", and was asked to be class president by the teacher, who thought he had "discipline and determination" because he had been playing violin since the age of five. He was expelled from West Kildonan in the middle of that year because of his "lack of studiousness", and finished his schooling at Garden City Collegiate. He went on to study business administration at what is now Red River College, but did not graduate.

== Professional musical career ==
=== The Guess Who ===
In 1960, Bachman and Chad Allan co-founded Al and the Silvertones in Winnipeg. By 1962, the band had changed their name to Chad Allan and the Expressions and later to the Guess Who. In 1965, the Guess Who had a No. 1 hit in Canada with their version of Johnny Kidd's "Shakin' All Over", which also charted in the US at No. 22. In 1966, Chad Allan left the band and Burton Cummings became the primary vocalist. Between 1966 and 1968, the Guess Who worked mostly in their home country, releasing numerous Top 40 singles in Canada. In early 1969, the group finally broke through internationally with the hit song "These Eyes", co-written by Bachman and Cummings. The Guess Who released three successful albums over the next two years: Wheatfield Soul (1969), Canned Wheat (1969), and American Woman (1970), which brought them mainstream attention. Bachman wrote or cowrote (primarily with Cummings) most of the group's songs during this period.

In early 1970, the single "American Woman" hit No. 1 on the US Hot 100 charts, a first for a band from Canada. A group composition, the song critiques the "ghetto scenes" and "war machines" of the US, reflecting the Guess Who's experiences of extensive touring in large American cities. With the Vietnam War at its peak, many American men went to Canada to escape US Military service. Bachman left the band at the height of its popularity, shortly after the release of American Woman. He has been quoted as leaving due to the other band members' lifestyle choices conflicting with his beliefs upon converting to the Church of Jesus Christ of Latter-day Saints, in addition to wanting to spend more time with his family members. He was also suffering health problems related to his gall bladder and needed to be under a doctor's care, something that was difficult to do while on the road.

=== Brave Belt and Bachman–Turner Overdrive ===
Before his departure from the Guess Who in May 1970, Bachman recorded an instrumental solo album for RCA Records, Axe, over three days in March 1970. The following year, he formed the country rock band Brave Belt with Chad Allan. Brave Belt released its first self-titled LP in 1971. Randy's brother Robbie Bachman was the drummer for Brave Belt, at barely 18 years-old. Fred Turner subsequently joined Brave Belt on bass and vocals, resulting in the band evolving into a heavier sound, which led to the departure of Chad Allan.

Left with a three-member line-up, Brave Belt added Tim Bachman as a second guitarist. With this lineup, the members signed a record deal with Mercury Records and renamed the band Bachman-Turner Overdrive. Often referred to as "B.T.O." for short, they released their first self-titled album, Bachman–Turner Overdrive in May 1973.

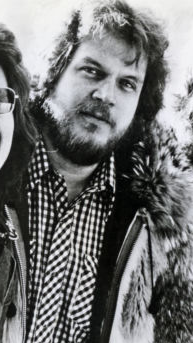
Bachman in 1974.

In December 1973, the band released their second album, Bachman–Turner Overdrive II. This album brought the band greater commercial success than their debut, with hits such as "Takin' Care of Business" and "Let It Ride", which charted at Nos. 12 and 23 in the US, respectively. In 1974, they released their third album titled, Not Fragile. The release hit No. 1 on the album charts in both Canada and the United States. The album contained the hits, "Roll On Down the Highway" and "You Ain't Seen Nothin' Yet", which charted at Nos. 14 and 1, respectively. With the latter, Randy had the rare accomplishment of recording an American chart-topper for two different Canadian bands; the other being "American Woman" while he was in the Guess Who.

The band remained on the charts through the mid-1970s with their next two albums, Four Wheel Drive and Head On. With these albums, they successfully had additional hit songs with "Hey You", "Take It Like a Man", and "Lookin' Out For No. 1". In late-1976, during the recording of their sixth studio album Freeways, some disagreements surfaced within the band. Bachman wrote all but one song and sang on every song but two, while some of the other band members felt that they did not have enough good material to record and wanted to delay the release. Upon its release, the album charted at No. 70 in the US, but had no hit singles. Randy Bachman officially quit the band in mid-March 1977. The rest of the band would continue to record and tour until the end of the decade, after Randy agreed to sell the rights to the "BTO" name to the remaining band members.

=== 1979–1981 ===
After his departure from Bachman–Turner Overdrive, Bachman recorded a second solo album titled Survivor. This release failed to chart in the US. Following the solo album, he formed a new rock band, with bassist/singer Tom Sparks, called Ironhorse. Ironhorse released their debut self-titled album in 1979. It contained the single "Sweet Lui-Louise", which charted at No. 36 in the US and No. 26 in Canada, and performed well in other parts of Europe including Italy. After the tour for this album, Tom Sparks left the band and was replaced by Frank Ludwig. The band released a second album in 1980 titled Everything Is Grey. The release contained pop rock influences with greater use of keyboards than the first album. After BTO broke up in early 1980, Fred Turner and Randy formed a new band called Union, and released only one album titled On Strike in 1981.

Later in the article From Rags to Riches and Back, Randy recalled building up a net worth of close to $10 million by 1977, only to go broke within four years. He attributed this to his divorce from his first wife Lorayne Stevenson and the court battles over custody of their children, as well as heavy investment in musical projects that did not become fruitful.

=== 1980s–1990s and reunions ===
Bachman rejoined the Guess Who in 1983 with Burton Cummings and other members of the American Woman era, for a publicized reunion. The band toured Canada and released a video of live performances. After The Guess Who reunion ended, Bachman rejoined Bachman-Turner Overdrive with Fred Turner, Tim Bachman, and Garry Peterson of The Guess Who taking over on drums. The reformed band released the self-titled Bachman-Turner Overdrive in 1984, as well as a live album in 1986, after which they opened for Van Halen during the 5150 tour in 1986. By 1987, Randy left the band.

By 1988, Bachman-Turner Overdrive had reformed again, this time with the popular 1974–1977 lineup. The band toured together until 1991, when Randy again departed.

In 1992, Bachman released his first solo album in 14 years, Any Road. Its personal songs included "Prairie Town", a remembrance of growing up in Winnipeg where he and Neil Young were teenage musicians at one time. Bachman recorded fast and slow versions of the song–representing winter and summer in Winnipeg, respectively, he said–featuring Young on vocals and guitar and Cowboy Junkies singer Margo Timmins on vocals. The accompanying videos were filmed in part in Young's barn in California.

Bachman rejoined the Guess Who for a reunion performance in Winnipeg at the end of the XIII Pan Am Games in August 1999.

=== 2000s ===
Bachman continued as a member of the Guess Who, and played with them on several tours. In 2000, he made a guest appearance on The Simpsons in an episode as himself, in a fictionalized reunion with his former Bachman–Turner Overdrive band-mates, C. F. Turner and Robin Bachman. Series creator Matt Groening, whose father is originally from Winnipeg, is a fan of the band. During their performance in the episode, Homer Simpson humorously yells "get to the working overtime part" while they perform "Takin' Care of Business".

In 2001, Bachman received an honorary Doctorate of Music from Brandon University in Brandon, Manitoba, along with the other members of The Guess Who. That year he won three SOCAN Classic Awards. In 2005, Bachman was awarded the Order of Manitoba, the highest award in the Province of Manitoba. He was inducted into Canada's Walk of Fame for the first time, for his time with the Guess Who in 2001. In 2002, the Guess Who were recipients of The Governor General's Performing Arts Award, Canada's foremost distinction for excellence in the performing arts. By July 2003, Bachman left the Guess Who with singer Burton Cummings, only to form a new project called Bachman Cummings.

In 2004, Bachman helped Kalan Porter on his debut album 219 Days. He reportedly suggested that Kalan do a drone on the violin during "In Spite of It All". He was also featured performing a guitar solo near the end of the song "And We Drive". During this period, Bachman also released an album of original melodic-jazz songs titled Jazz Thing.

By the summer of 2005, Bachman began hosting the coast-to-coast radio show Vinyl Tap on CBC Radio One. For the show, he played audio recordings, primarily Classic rock music, while reminiscing about personal encounters with famous artists and musicians from his 50-year career in rock music. The show ran for 16 seasons with its final episode on Canada Day, July 1, 2021. After this cancellation by CBC, Bachman said he planned to take the program to another broadcaster or turn it into a podcast.

On July 2, 2005, Bachman performed at the Canadian leg of the global Live 8 mega-concert organized by Bob Geldof. In 2008, Bachman was made an officer of the Order of Canada.

Bachman continued his career touring with the Randy Bachman Band, as well as the Bachman-Cummings Band. During this time he featured in a theater-styled show called "Every Song Tells A Story", where he performed live and unplugged with his band, often telling the stories behind writing his most famous songs from the 1960s and 1970s. Bachman and Burton Cummings performed throughout Canada as Bachman & Cummings in the summer of 2006, while on tour with the Carpet Frogs. Bachman and Fred Turner completed a new Bachman & Turner album that was released in September 2010. The album's single, titled "Rollin' Along", was released in June 2010 on iTunes. The pair launched a two-year world tour (2010–2011) under their Bachman & Turner moniker, beginning at the Sweden Rock Festival in June 2010. Other confirmed dates included the High Voltage Festival in London, UK, in July 2010 and the Manitoba Homecoming Event in Winnipeg, Manitoba. The pair released the next single "Rock n' Roll Is the Only Way Out" on their official website.

=== The 2010s ===
Bachman was inducted into Canada's Walk of Fame for the second time, now as a solo artist, in 2012. In June 2015, he received SOCAN's Lifetime Achievement Award. In 2014, he released a home video package of his "Every Song Tells A Story" performances, which includes an occasional accompanying symphonic orchestra.

In 2015, he released an album titled Heavy Blues from his newly-formed band, Bachman. The album was influenced by classic 1960s blues rock and features musical contributions from other musicians, including Neil Young, Joe Bonamassa, Peter Frampton, Robert Randolph, and Jeff Healey. Later in March 2018, Bachman released a tribute to George Harrison containing versions of the latter's hits. The album featured one original song titled "Between Two Mountains", and also featured Walter Trout on the album's version of "While My Guitar Gently Weeps".

Randy and Fred Turner continued to tour as Bachman & Turner through 2018, when Fred amicably retired.

=== The 2020s ===
Bachman appeared in a CBC television broadcast benefit called "Stronger Together, Tous Ensemble" on April 26, 2020, featuring various Canadian musicians and entertainers. Bachman made a brief one-minute appearance to thank the front-line Canadian workers and proceeded to play a short parody of "Taking Care of Business".

== Guitar style ==
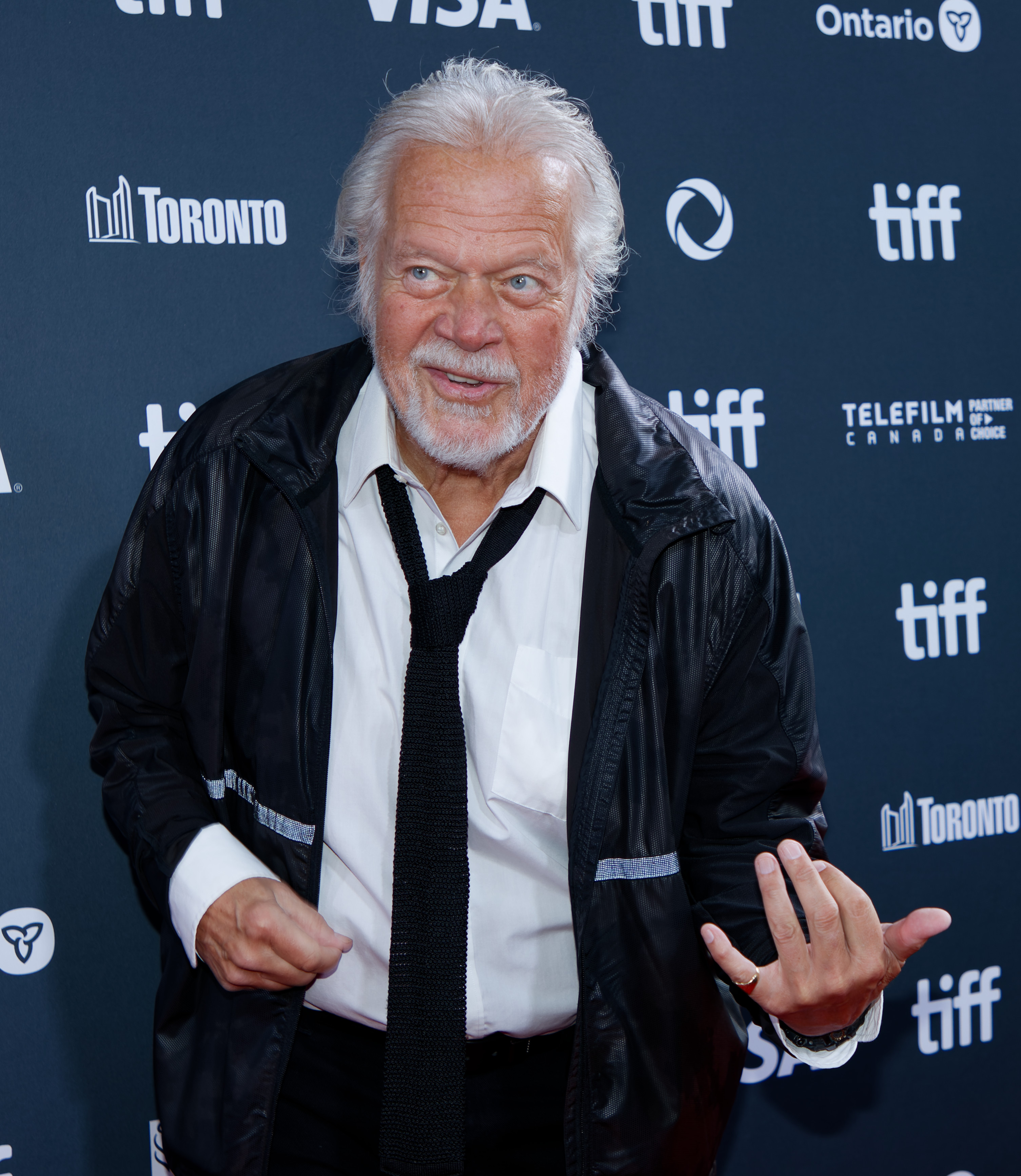
Bachman playing air guitar at the 2024 Toronto International Film Festival

Bachman has stated that his guitar sound was influenced by his early violin studies, saying "when I wanted to play a rock solo, I played like it was violin ... Violin is mostly slow, melodic stuff. So my guitar solos tend to be smooth, slow lines."

He has mentioned in interviews that his guitar influences include Lenny Breau, Leslie West, Wes Montgomery, George Peterson, and Hank Marvin.

== Personal life ==
Bachman's first marriage was to Lorayne Stevenson (1966 to 1977). With Stevenson, Bachman had six children. His son, Tal Bachman, is a recording artist best known for his 1999 top-20 hit song "She's So High". His daughter Lorelei Bachman is also a writer and musician. He was later married to Denise McCann from 1982 to 2011, and they had one child. They resided in Salt Spring Island, British Columbia, Canada. Bachman and McCann separated in 2011.

Bachman converted to his wife's Mormon religion in 1966, when he married her at 23. During his early Guess Who years, Bachman's Mormon beliefs conflicted with the sex, drugs and rock 'n' roll lifestyle of the other band members. His son Tal Bachman later renounced the religion. Randy Bachman left the religion shortly afterwards, stating: "(My) son, who is a scholar, pointed out things to me that were incorrect, not true, legend.”

Bachman has struggled with obesity. He originally lost 60 pounds by diet and exercise after previously weighing 380 pounds. He became aware of the threat his obesity posed to his health during a performance at Winnipeg Stadium for the 1999 Pan American Games, realizing that his weight-induced back and knee pain was making touring impossible.

During an extended ground time following the September 11, 2001 attacks, Bachman began overeating again. At his next physical after the tour, his physician told him he was morbidly obese. He asked, "Doesn't morbid mean death?" The physician told him of the risks he faced as a result of his obesity. Bachman remembered that Carnie Wilson, the daughter of his friend Brian Wilson of the Beach Boys, had successfully lost weight using bariatric surgery, and sought out her surgeon to help him. Following surgery, he lost 155 pounds by 2006, reaching his 225-pound target weight.

Bachman also had a successful operation on his shoulder in November 2007 to repair a torn rotator cuff, which he has blamed on his decades-long use of heavy guitars.

Bachman has 28 grandchildren and 6 great-grandchildren.

Bachman is a member of the Canadian charity Artists Against Racism.

In January 2023, Bachman announced on Twitter that his younger brother Robbie had died, but he did not specify a cause of death. In the statement, he also paid tribute to Jeff Beck, who died two days earlier, saying "maybe Jeff Beck needs a drummer!"

In May 2023, he announced in a tweet the deaths of his brothers Gary and Tim "in quick succession since the pandemic," leaving Randy as the only living member among the four Bachman brothers.

In 2021, his 1957 Gretsch 6120 Chet Atkins guitar, which had been stolen from a hotel room in the Toronto area 45 years before, was found in Japan using facial recognition software. The guitar was in the possession of a Japanese musician named Takeshi, and Bachman subsequently travelled to Japan to trade another guitar of the same model.

== Discography ==
=== Solo ===
- 1970 Axe – referred to on the cover in the release by RCA in 1975 as simply "Randy Bachman Solo Album"
- 1978 Survivor
- 1992 Any Road – referred to on the cover simply as "Bachman"
- 1993 Bob's Garage – live 5-track mini-album recorded for a radio show in Seattle
- 1996 Merge
- 1998 Songbook
- 2001 Every Song Tells A Story
- 2004 Jazz Thing
- 2006 Bachman Cummings Songbook – a compilation that features tracks from The Guess Who, Burton Cummings, and Bachman–Turner Overdrive
- 2006 The Thunderbird Trax – a compilation of previously unreleased material recorded by Bachman and Cummings, collected from Bachman's tool shed in 1987
- 2007 Jazz Thing II
- 2007 Jukebox
- 2008 Takin' Care of Christmas – a compilation of Bachman performing classic Christmas songs, with the title track being a reworked version of BTO's "Takin' Care of Business"
- 2010 Bachman & Turner, with former BTO vocalist/bassist Fred Turner
- 2014 Vinyl Tap Every Song Tells A Story
- 2015 Heavy Blues
- 2018 By George By Bachman – a tribute album to George Harrison

=== Chad Allan & The Expressions ===
Original albums:

- 1965: Shakin 'All Over'
- 1965: Hey Ho (What You Do To Me)
- 1966: Chad Allan & The Expressions

Compilation:

- 2008: Early Roots – Compilation.

=== The Guess Who? ===
- 1966: It's Time (The Guess Who album) – This is the only album with Chad Allan and Burton Cummings sharing the vocals.
- 1968: A Wild Pair – Side A is dedicated to The Staccatos, while side B features The Guess Who?

=== The Guess Who ===
Studio albums:

- 1969: Wheatfield Soul
- 1969: Canned Wheat
- 1970: American Woman
- 1970: Born in Canada
- 1976: The Way They Were

Live albums:

- 1984: Together Again
- 1984: Reunion
- 2000: Running Back Thru Canada

=== Brave Belt ===
- 1971: Brave Belt
- 1972: Brave Belt II

=== Bachman-Turner Overdrive ===
Studio albums:

- 1973: Bachman-Turner Overdrive
- 1973: Bachman-Turner Overdrive II
- 1974: Not Fragile
- 1975: Four Wheel Drive
- 1975: Head On
- 1977: Freeways
- 1984: Bachman-Turner Overdrive

Live albums:

- 1977: B.T.O. Live in Japan
- 1986: Live Live Live
- 1990: All Time Greatest Hits Live – Reissue of Live Live Live
- 1994: Best Of Bachman-Turner Overdrive Live
- 1998: King Biscuit Flower Hour Presents
- 2003: From the Front Row Live

Compilations:

- 1976: Best of BTO (So Far)
- 1983: You Ain't Seen Nothin 'Yet'
- 1986: BTO's Greatest
- 1993: Anthology
- 1998: Takin 'Care of Business
- 2000: The Millennium Collection
- 2001: Classic
- 2005: Gold
- 2008: The Definitive Collection
- 2010: Icon
- 2015: Bachman – Turner Overdrive Classic Album Set – 8 CD box set
- 2020: Essentials

=== Ironhorse ===
- 1979: Ironhorse
- 1980: Everything is Gray
- 2018: Ironhorse / Everything is Gray – compilation

=== Union ===
- 1981: On Strike

=== Bachman Cummings ===
- 2006: The Thunderbird Trax – recorded in 1987
- 2006: Bachman Cummings Songbook – compilation
- 2007: Jukebox

=== Bachman & Turner ===
- 2010: Bachman & Turner
- 2010: Forged In Rock
- 2010: Rolling Along – compilation
- 2012: Live at the Roseland Ballroom, NYC

=== Collaborations ===
- 1997: Ringo Starr And His Third All-Starr Band Volume 1 – Randy on "No Sugar Tonight" and "You Ain't Seen Nothin' Yet"
- 2000: Calgary Rock Awards – Various Artists compilation; Randy on six songs.
- 2000: The Anthology... So Far by Ringo Starr And His All-Starr Band – Randy on "Takin 'Care Of Business" and "You Ain't Seen Nothin' Yet"
- 2001: The Best Of Ringo Starr And His All-Starr Band So Far... – Live compilation; Randy on "You Ain't Seen Nothin' Yet"
- 2001: The Anthology ... Sampler by Ringo Starr And His All-Starr Band – Randy on "You Ain't Seen Nothin' Yet"
- 2004: 219 Days by Kalan Porter – Vocals on "And We Drive"
- 2009: Songs from the Road by Jeff Healey – Guitar on "Hoochie Coochie Man"
- 2009: High Class Trailer Trash by Shelly Rastin – featuring Randy Bachman
- 2012: Who Are You: An All Star Tribute To The Who – Various Artists compilation; Randy on guitar, with Gretchen Wilson on vocals on "Who Are You"

== See also ==
- Canadian rock
- Music of Canada
