= 20th Century Masters – The Millennium Collection: The Best of Bachman–Turner Overdrive =

Compilation album by Bachman–Turner Overdrive
- Released: September 26, 2000
- Genre: Rock
- Length: 53:42
- Label: Mercury; MCA
- Producer: Bill Levenson (compilation); Randy Bachman (original recordings of all tracks except "I'm In Love", produced by BTO, and "Heartaches", produced by Jim Wallace)

Bachman–Turner Overdrive chronology
King Biscuit Flower Hour: Bachman–Turner Overdrive (1998)	20th Century Masters – The Millennium Collection: The Best of Bachman–Turner Overdrive (2000)	Gold (2006)

20th Century Masters – The Millennium Collection: The Best of Bachman–Turner Overdrive is a compilation by the Canadian rock band Bachman–Turner Overdrive, released on September 26, 2000 by Mercury and MCA Records. The album features an essay on the band written by Joseph F. Laredo.

== Reception ==
Professional ratings
Review scores
Source	Rating
AllMusic	(Note: The review of Colour Collection is used for the review of 20th Century Masters, but the rating is for the latter.)
The Encyclopedia of Popular Music	4/5 stars

James Christopher Monger said of the Colour Collection reissue that "Universal International's Colour Collection features a branded die-cut digipak and 15 Bachman-Turner Overdrive songs", noting that "As far as "greatest-hits" compilations go, this one hits all of the right notes", concluding by saying that fans should instead buy either The Anthology (1993) or Gold (2005).

== Track listing ==
Standard edition
No.	Title	Writer(s)	Original release	Length
1.	"Gimme Your Money Please"	C.F. Turner	Bachman–Turner Overdrive (May 1973)	4:41
2.	"Blue Collar"	C.F. Turner	Bachman–Turner Overdrive	6:30
3.	"Takin' Care of Business"	Randy Bachman	Bachman–Turner Overdrive II (December 1973)	4:50
4.	"Let It Ride"	C.F. Turner and Randy Bachman	Bachman–Turner Overdrive II	4:23
5.	"Roll On down the Highway"	C.F. Turner and Robin Bachman	Not Fragile (1974)	3:57
6.	"You Ain't Seen Nothing Yet"	Randy Bachman	Not Fragile	3:54
7.	"Hey You"	Randy Bachman	Four Wheel Drive (May 1975)	3:31
8.	"Take It Like a Man"	C.F. Turner and Blair Thornton	Head On (December 1975)	3:40
9.	"Lookin Out for #1"	Randy Bachman	Head On	5:19
10.	"Shotgun Rider"	Randy Bachman	Freeways (1977)	5:21
11.	"I'm In Love"	C.F. Turner, Thornton, Randy Bachman and Jim Clench	Street Action (1978)	3:52
12.	"Heartaches"	C.F. Turner	Rock n' Roll Nights (1979)	3:53
Total length:				53:42

== Personnel ==
Adapted from the booklet:

=== Bachman-Turner Overdrive ===
- Randy Bachman – lead and acoustic guitar, vocals (1–10)
- Tim Bachman – acoustic lead and rhythm guitar, vocals (1–4)
- Blair Thornton (on tracks 5–12) – lead and slide guitar, background vocals
- C.F. Turner – bass, guitar, vocals
- Jim Clench – bass, vocals (11–12)
- Rob Bachman – drums and percussion, background vocals

=== Additional personnel ===
- Barry Keane – congos on "Blue Collar"
- Norman Durkee – piano on "Takin' Care of Business"
- Little Richard – piano on "Take it Like a Man"
- John Hall – piano on "I'm In Love"
