= Gold (Bachman–Turner Overdrive album) =

Compilation album by Bachman–Turner Overdrive
- Released: October 11, 2005
- Genre: Rock
- Length: 2:35:06
- Label: Mercury
- Producer: Randy Bachman

Bachman–Turner Overdrive chronology
20th Century Masters – The Millennium Collection: The Best of Bachman–Turner Overdrive (2001)	Gold (2005)	Bachman–Turner Overdrive 40th Anniversary (2013)

Professional ratings
Review scores
Source	Rating
AllMusic	4/5 stars

Bachman–Turner Overdrive Gold is a compilation album by Bachman–Turner Overdrive. It was released in 2005 by Mercury Records.

== Track listing ==
Disc one

1. "Gimme Your Money Please" (Fred Turner)
2. "Hold Back the Water" (Randy Bachman, Robbie Bachman, Kirk Kelly)
3. "Blue Collar" (Turner)
4. "Little Gandy Dancer" (Randy Bachman)
5. "Stayed Awake All Night" (Randy Bachman)
6. "Don't Get Yourself in Trouble" (Randy Bachman)
7. "Thank You for the Feelin'" (Turner)
8. "Takin' Care of Business" (Randy Bachman)
9. "Give it Time" (Turner)
10. "Welcome Home" (Randy Bachman)
11. "Let It Ride" (Randy Bachman, Turner)
12. "You Ain't Seen Nothing Yet" (Randy Bachman)
13. "Not Fragile" (Turner)
14. "Rock Is My Life, and This Is My Song" (Randy Bachman)
15. "Roll on Down the Highway" (Turner, Robbie Bachman)
16. "Free Wheelin'" (Blair Thornton)
17. "Blue Moanin'" (Turner)

Disc two

1. "Four-Wheel Drive" (Randy Bachman, Thornton)
2. "Hey You" (Randy Bachman)
3. "Flat Broke Love" (Turner)
4. "She's Keepin' Time" (Randy Bachman)
5. "Quick Change Artist" (Randy Bachman, Turner)
6. "Don't Let the Blues Get You Down" (Turner)
7. "Find Out About Love" (Randy Bachman)
8. "It's Over" (Turner)
9. "Take It Like a Man" (Turner, Thornton)
10. "Lookin' Out for #1" (Randy Bachman)
11. "Away from Home" (Turner)
12. "Down to the Line" (Randy Bachman, Kim Fowley, Mark Anthony, Vincent Furnier)
13. "Life Still Goes On [I'm Lonely]" (Turner)
14. "Shotgun Rider" (Randy Bachman)
15. "My Wheels Won't Turn" (Randy Bachman)
16. "Down, Down" (Randy Bachman)
17. "Down the Road" (Turner, Thornton, Robbie Bachman, Jim Clench)
18. "Heartaches" (Turner)

== Personnel ==
Disc One/Tracks 1–11:

- Randy Bachman - lead guitar, lead vocals
- Fred Turner - bass guitar, lead vocals
- Tim Bachman - guitar, vocals
- Robbie Bachman - drums

Disc One/Tracks 12–17 and Disc Two/Tracks 1–16:

- Randy Bachman - lead guitar, lead vocals
- Fred Turner - bass guitar, lead vocals
- Blair Thornton - 2nd lead guitar, backing vocals
- Robbie Bachman - drums

Disc Two/Tracks 17–18:

- Fred Turner - guitar, lead vocals
- Jim Clench - bass guitar, lead vocals
- Blair Thornton - lead guitar, backing vocals
- Robbie Bachman - drums
