= Best of B.T.O. (So Far) =

Greatest hits album by Bachman–Turner Overdrive
- Released: July 1976
- Recorded: 1973–1975
- Genre: Rock
- Label: Mercury

Bachman–Turner Overdrive chronology
Head On (1975)	Best of B.T.O. (So Far) (1976)	B.T.O. Live – Japan Tour (1977)

Singles from Best of B.T.O.
- 1. "Gimme Your Money Please" Released: 1976

Professional ratings
Review scores
Source	Rating
Allmusic	link
Christgau's Record Guide	B+

Best of B.T.O. (So Far) (1976, Mercury Records) is a compilation album by Bachman–Turner Overdrive that contains material from their first five studio albums. "Gimme Your Money Please," a cut from the band's 1973 debut album, was released as a single in 1976 to support this greatest hits package.

A remastered version was released in 1998, titled Best of B.T.O. (Remastered Hits), which added the tracks "Four Wheel Drive", "Free Wheelin'", and "Down to the Line". The European issue added another six tracks. All songs were also full-length album versions, though in the U.S. the single edit of "Let It Ride" was used.

== Track listing ==
1. "Roll On Down the Highway" (Robbie Bachman, C.F. Turner) - 3:56
2. "Hey You" (Randy Bachman) - 3:33
3. "Lookin' Out for #1" (Randy Bachman) - 5:20
4. "Gimme Your Money Please" (C.F. Turner) - 4:21
5. "Let It Ride" (Randy Bachman, C.F. Turner) - 3:33
6. "Take It Like a Man" (C.F. Turner, Blair Thornton) - 3:40
7. "You Ain't Seen Nothing Yet" (Randy Bachman) - 3:38
8. "Blue Collar" (C.F. Turner) - 6:05
9. "Takin' Care of Business" (Randy Bachman) - 4:45

=== Additional tracks on Best of B.T.O. (Remastered Hits) - 1998 ===
10. "Four-Wheel Drive" (Randy Bachman, Blair Thornton) - 4:20
11. "Free Wheelin'" (Blair Thornton) - 3:44
12. "Down to the Line (Randy Bachman, Kim Fowley, Mark Anthony, Vincent Furnier) - 4:01

=== Additional tracks on the European Best of B.T.O. (Remastered Hits) - 1998 ===
13. "I'm in Love" (B.T.O.) - 3:52
14. "Shotgun Rider" (Randy Bachman) - 5:21
15. "Jamaica" (J. Vallance) - 4:08
16. "Down the Road" (B.T.O.) - 4:05
17. "Heartaches" (C.F. Turner) - 3:53
18. "Down, Down" (Randy Bachman) - 4:22

=== Additional tracks on the Brazilian Best of B.T.O. (Remastered Hits) - 1998 ===
13. "I'm in Love" (B.T.O.) - 3:52
14. "Jamaica" (J. Vallance) - 4:08
15. "Down the Road" (B.T.O.) - 4:05
16. "Heartaches" (C.F. Turner) - 3:53
17. "Down, Down" (Randy Bachman) - 4:22
18. "Hold Back the Water" (Randy Bachman, Rob Bachman, R. Kelly) - 5:04

== Lineup ==
Tracks 1, 2, 3, 6 and 7:

- Randy Bachman - lead guitar, vocals
- C.F. "Fred" Turner - bass, vocals
- Blair Thornton - 2nd lead guitar, backing vocals
- Robbie Bachman - drums

Tracks 4, 5, 8 and 9:

- Randy Bachman - lead guitar, vocals
- C.F. "Fred" Turner - bass, vocals
- Tim Bachman - guitar, backing vocals
- Robbie Bachman - drums

== Personnel ==
- Bachman-Turner Overdrive: Composer, Performer, Primary Artist
- Randy Bachman: Composer, Producer, Guitar, Vocals
- Blair Thornton: Composer, Guitar, Backing Vocals
- Tim Bachman: Guitar, Backing Vocals
- C.F. Turner: Composer, Bass, Vocals
- Robbie Bachman: Composer, Drums
- Little Richard: Piano (Guest Artist)
- Norman Durkee: Piano (Guest Artist)
- Barry Keane: Congas (Guest Artist)

== Charts ==
Album

Year	Chart	Position
1976	US Billboard 200 Pop Albums	19

Singles

Year	Single	Chart	Position
1976	"Gimme Your Money Please"	US Billboard Pop Singles	70

== Certifications ==
Certifications for "Best of B.T.O. (So Far)"
Region	Certification	Certified units/sales
Canada (Music Canada)	Platinum	100,000^{^}
United States (RIAA)	Platinum	1,000,000^{^}
^{^} Shipments figures based on certification alone.
