= The Anthology (Bachman–Turner Overdrive album) =

Compilation album by Bachman–Turner Overdrive
- Released: July 20, 1993
- Genre: Rock
- Length: 152:08
- Label: Mercury

Bachman–Turner Overdrive chronology
BTO's Greatest (1986)	The Anthology (1993)	Best of Bachman–Turner Overdrive Live (1994)

Professional ratings
Review scores
Source	Rating
AllMusic	4/5 stars

The Anthology is a 2-disc set that contains previously released and unreleased material of Bachman–Turner Overdrive studio and live recordings. In addition, the first two songs on Disc One are from BTO's precursor group, Brave Belt.

== Track listing ==
Disc one

1. "The Letter" (Wayne Carson Thompson) - 4:35 (demo of 1971, previously unreleased)
2. "I Think You Better Slow Down/Slow Down Boogie" (Randy Bachman) - 9:09 (recorded for the first LP sessions, previously unreleased)
3. "Hold Back the Water" (Randy Bachman, Robbie Bachman, Kirk Kelly) - 5:04
4. "Blue Collar" (C.F. Turner) - 6:09
5. "Gimme Your Money Please" (C.F. Turner) - 4:40
6. "Stayed Awake All Night" (Randy Bachman) - 8:26 (previously unreleased version)
7. "Thank You for the Feelin'" (C.F. Turner) - 4:04
8. "Takin' Care of Business" (Randy Bachman) - 4:49
9. "Give It Time" (C.F. Turner) - 5:41
10. "Welcome Home" (Randy Bachman) - 5:29
11. "Let It Ride" (Randy Bachman, C.F. Turner) - 4:24
12. "Freewheelin'" [Quad Mix] (Blair Thornton) - 3:44
13. "Sledgehammer" (Randy Bachman) - 4:33
14. "Blue Moanin'" (C.F. Turner) - 3:42

Disc two

1. "You Ain't Seen Nothing Yet" (Randy Bachman) - 3:52
2. "Not Fragile" [Quad Mix] (C.F. Turner) - 4:05
3. "Rock Is My Life, And This Is My Song" [Quad Mix] (Randy Bachman) - 5:00
4. "Roll On Down the Highway" (Robbie Bachman, C.F. Turner) - 3:58
5. "Four-Wheel Drive" (Randy Bachman, Blair Thornton) - 4:20
6. "Hey You" (Randy Bachman) - 3:33
7. "Flat Broke Love" [Quad Mix] (C.F. Turner) - 3:56
8. "Don't Let the Blues Get You Down" (C.F. Turner) - 4:11
9. "Find Out About Love" (Randy Bachman) - 4:41
10. "It's Over" (C.F. Turner) - 3:23
11. "Take It Like a Man" (C.F. Turner, Blair Thornton) - 3:42
12. "Lookin' Out For No. 1" (Randy Bachman) - 5:19
13. "Down To The Line" (Randy Bachman, Kim Fowley, Mark Anthony, Vincent Furnier) - 4:01 (non-album single of 1975)
14. "Don't Get Yourself in Trouble" [Live Version] (Randy Bachman) - 10:34
15. "Shotgun Rider" (Randy Bachman) - 5:21
16. "I'm in Love" (Robbie Bachman, C.F. Turner, Jim Clench, Blair Thornton) - 3:50
17. "Heartaches" (C.F. Turner) - 3:53
