= BTO's Greatest =

Greatest hits album by Bachman–Turner Overdrive
- Released: 1986
- Genre: Rock
- Length: 54:18
- Label: Mercury
- Producer: Randy Bachman (tracks: 1–10); Jim Vallance (tracks: 11–12)

Bachman–Turner Overdrive chronology
Live Live Live (1986)	BTO's Greatest (1986)	The Anthology (1993)

Professional ratings
Review scores
Source	Rating
AllMusic	link

BTO's Greatest is a U.S. CD-only compilation album by Bachman–Turner Overdrive. It was released in 1986 by Mercury Records. It was released in Europe also on vinyl.

== Track listing ==
1. "Looking Out for No.1" (Randy Bachman) - 5:20
2. "Roll On Down the Highway" (Robbie Bachman, Fred Turner) - 3:55
3. "Hey You" (Randy Bachman) - 3:34
4. "Freeways" (Randy Bachman) - 4:56
5. "Takin' Care of Business" (Randy Bachman) - 4:52
6. "Down, Down" (Randy Bachman) - 4:20
7. "You Ain't Seen Nothing Yet" (Randy Bachman) - 3:38
8. "Let It Ride" (Randy Bachman, Turner) - 4:28
9. "Flat Broke Love" (Turner) - 3:57
10. "Can We All Come Together" (Randy Bachman) - 5:50
11. "Rock and Roll Nights" (Jim Clench) - 5:19
12. "Jamaica" (Jim Vallance) - 4:09
