= Blair Thornton =

Canadian guitarist (born 1950)

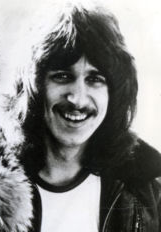
- Thornton in 1974

Background information
- Born: July 23, 1950 (age 76); Vancouver, British Columbia, Canada
- Genre: Rock
- Occupation: Guitarist
- Years active: 1970–present

Blair Montgomery Thornton (born July 23, 1950) is a Canadian guitarist and songwriter most widely known for his work with the rock band Bachman-Turner Overdrive (BTO). He also played in the band Crosstown Bus prior to joining BTO.

== Biography ==
Thornton was a guitarist in later lineups of the Nelson, BC band Crosstown Bus. The band had released one album, High Grass, on MCA Records before Blair's arrival.

Thornton joined BTO in early 1974 during the supporting tour for the Bachman-Turner Overdrive II album, replacing Tim Bachman shortly after that album was released. Thornton made his live debut with BTO at a March 1974 televised event for Don Kirshner's In Concert program hosted by Don E. Branker.

Thornton's first album with BTO was the highly successful Not Fragile LP, released in the fall of 1974. Upon Thornton's arrival, BTO began incorporating "dual-lead" guitar solos into many new songs, with Thornton playing the lead guitar parts along with primary lead guitarist Randy Bachman. Such solos were not a major feature on the band's first two albums. In interviews years later, Randy noted that Blair Thornton was a welcome addition:

He was known for playing in the Eric Clapton/Bluesbreakers style. [He] was more advanced on the guitar than my brother Tim, who was basically a rhythm player who left all the lead to me. Blair brought in a new style. We now had twin lead guitars, and that made my job a lot easier; it gave us more versatility.

As a songwriter, Thornton contributed two compositions to the Not Fragile album: "Givin' It All Away" and an instrumental called "Freewheelin'" that also wound up as the B-side of the No. 1 hit "You Ain't Seen Nothing Yet". He also co-wrote three songs for the follow-up 1975 album, Four Wheel Drive, including the title track (with Randy Bachman), and co-wrote the Top 40 hit "Take It Like a Man" (with Fred Turner) for the late 1975 album Head On. Two other songs on Head On, "It's Over" and "Wild Spirit", also credit Thornton as a co-writer.

Following Randy Bachman's departure from the group in 1977, Thornton took over as primary lead guitarist on their next two albums: Street Action (1978) and Rock n' Roll Nights (1979), also contributing several compositions. Thornton rejoined the "classic" Not Fragile line-up (Randy Bachman, Robbie Bachman, and Fred Turner) in 1988 for a reunion tour. In 1991, Randy Bachman left the group again and this time was replaced by Vancouver guitarist-singer Randy Murray. This version of BTO proved to be the most enduring, as they toured together until the latter part of 2004.

In 2014, Thornton along with original band members Fred Turner, Robbie and Randy Bachman were inducted into the Canadian Music Hall of Fame. Thornton currently enjoys a quiet semi-retirement with his wife, Shane.

== Discography ==
=== With Bachman–Turner Overdrive ===
==== Studio albums ====
| Title | Details |
|---|---|
| Not Fragile | Released: September 1974; Label: Mercury; Formats: LP, MC, 8-track |
| Four Wheel Drive | Released: May 1975; Label: Mercury; Formats: LP, MC, 8-track |
| Head On | Released: December 1975; Label: Mercury; Formats: LP, MC, 8-track |
| Freeways | Released: February 1977; Label: Mercury; Formats: LP, MC, 8-track |
| Street Action | Released: February 1978; Label: Mercury; Formats: LP, MC, 8-track |
| Rock n' Roll Nights | Released: March 1979; Label: Mercury; Formats: LP, MC, 8-track |
| Trial by Fire: Greatest & Latest | Released: 1996; Label: CMC; Formats: CD |

==== Live albums ====
| Title | Details |
|---|---|
| B.T.O. Japan Tour Live | Released: 1977; Label: Mercury; Formats: LP; Recorded at Nippon Budokan in 1977 |
| Best of Bachman–Turner Overdrive Live | Released: January 24, 1994; Label: Curb; Formats: CD, MC; More recordings from Tallahassee in 1985 |
| King Biscuit Flower Hour: Bachman–Turner Overdrive | Released: April 7, 1998; Label: King Biscuit Flower Hour; Formats: CD; Recorded in Chicago in 1974 |

==== Singles ====
| Single | Year |
|---|---|
| "You Ain't Seen Nothing Yet" | 1974 |
| "Not Fragile" (France-only release) | 1974 |
| "Roll On Down the Highway" | 1975 |
| "Hey You" | 1975 |
| "Quick Change Artist" (Canada-only release) | 1975 |
| "Down to the Line" | 1975 |
| "Take It Like a Man" | 1976 |
| "Away from Home" (UK-only release) | 1976 |
| "Lookin' Out for #1" | 1976 |
| "My Wheels Won't Turn" | 1977 |
| "Life Still Goes On (I'm Lonely)" | 1977 |
| "Shotgun Rider" | 1977 |
| "Down, Down" (Germany-only release) | 1977 |
| "Down the Road" | 1978 |
| "Jamaica" | 1979 |
| "Heartaches" | 1979 |
| "Wooly Bully" | 1989 |
| "The House of the Rising Sun" (Europe-only release) | 1996 |

== Awards and recognitions ==
=== Juno Awards ===
| Year | Award | Result |
|---|---|---|
| 1974 | Most Promising Group of the Year | Won |
| 1974 | Contemporary Album of the Year | Won |
| 1975 | Group of the Year | Won |
| 1975 | Best Selling Album of the Year | Won |
| 1976 | Group of the Year | Won |
| 1976 | Best Selling Album of the Year | Won |
| 1976 | Best Selling Single of the Year | Won |
| 1978 | Group of the Year | Nominated |
| 2014 | Canadian Music Hall of Fame Inductee | |
