= Bachman–Turner Overdrive (disambiguation) =

Bachman–Turner Overdrive are a Canadian rock band from Winnipeg, Manitoba.

Bachman–Turner Overdrive may also refer to:

- Bachman–Turner Overdrive (1973 album)
- Bachman–Turner Overdrive (1984 album)

== See also ==
- Bachman–Turner Overdrive II (1973)
- BTO (disambiguation)
