= Fred Turner (musician) =

Canadian musician

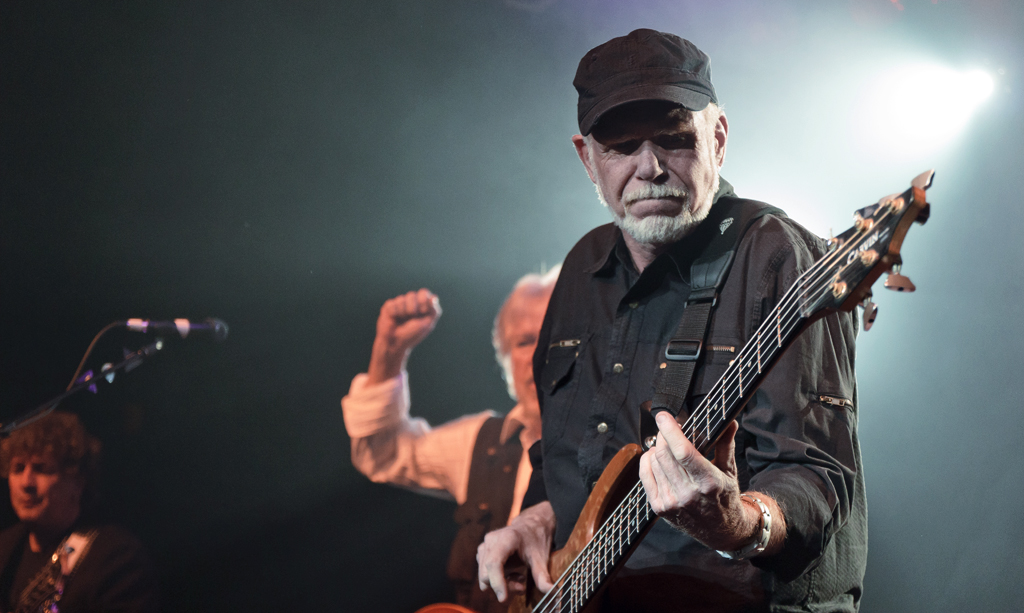
- Turner performing in 2011

Background information
- Also known as: C.F. Turner, Fred Turner
- Born: Charles Frederick Turner; October 16, 1943 (age 82); Winnipeg, Manitoba, Canada
- Genres: Rock, hard rock
- Occupations: Musician, songwriter
- Instruments: Vocals, bass, guitar
- Years active: 1970–2018, 2023–present
- Website: bachmanandturner.com

Charles Frederick Turner (born October 16, 1943) is a Canadian rock bassist, vocalist and songwriter known as a founder and only constant member of the 1970s rock band Bachman–Turner Overdrive, though he only makes select appearances in concert since their reformation in 2023.

== History ==
Fred Turner played in over a dozen bands in and around Winnipeg during his early adult years, his first vocal recordings being with the group Pink Plumm, which released one independent single titled "Along Came Pride". Based upon advice Randy Bachman received from Neil Young, Turner was subsequently asked to join Randy's band Brave Belt in 1971. At the time, Turner was playing and singing in a cover band called the D-Drifters. The D-Drifters wanted to continue doing cover songs, and had repeatedly rejected Turner's original compositions. When the call came from Bachman, Turner jumped at the chance to join a band that played original material.

The lead vocalist for the first Brave Belt album was Chad Allan, Randy Bachman's former bandmate from The Guess Who. While shopping around the tapes to record companies and eventually getting interest from Reprise Records, Randy was required to list the band members for contracts. Although he had played both lead guitar and bass on the recording, Randy listed Turner as the bassist. Turner's photo was put on the Brave Belt back cover, but he was not involved in the recordings.

Turner did join Brave Belt for live performances to support the first album, and soon stepped in as a full-time lead vocalist and bassist, which led to the departure of Allan. Fred contributed five song compositions to the follow-up Brave Belt II album (1972), and he sang lead vocal on nine of the album's eleven songs. The Brave Belt II touring lineup, which now consisted of Turner with Randy, Robbie and Tim Bachman, recorded another album despite being dropped from Reprise Records. While shopping around this "Brave Belt III" album and eventually being signed by Mercury Records, the band changed its name to Bachman–Turner Overdrive (BTO). Although Randy Bachman was the more widely known name because of his years with The Guess Who, Robbie Bachman stated in numerous interviews that there could have been no "BTO sound" without Turner's contributions: "The first Brave Belt album was very country-rock. Everything changed when Fred joined the band. We had Fred Turner's heavy, rough voice. We evolved because of Mr. Turner." Said Turner himself, "I think I brought a hard edge to the band. It was pretty countryish when I joined."

Turner and BTO enjoyed a period of peak popularity between 1973 and 1976, which saw the band release five Top 40 albums and six US Top 40 singles (eleven in Canada). Fred composed and sang lead on BTO's first US-charting single, "Blue Collar" (#68 in 1973), which appeared on the band's debut album. However, it was the second album, Bachman–Turner Overdrive II, that made BTO a household name, propelled by the hits "Takin' Care of Business" (US #12, Canada #3) and "Let It Ride" (US #23, Canada #3). "Let it Ride" featured Turner as lead vocalist and co-composer. The band then found international success with the 1974 album Not Fragile, which hit #1 in both the US and Canada while reaching the top ten in several other countries. BTO had two more hit albums with Four Wheel Drive and Head On, which charted at Nos. 5 and 23, respectively, in the US.

When Randy Bachman left Bachman–Turner Overdrive in late 1977, Turner switched from bass to rhythm guitar to make room for bassist–vocalist Jim Clench. This new line-up for 1978–79 was only called B.T.O. and nothing else, due to legal issues surrounding the use of the Bachman surname. After two albums and supporting tours through late 1979, this version of B.T.O. officially disbanded in early 1980. Turner resumed his original role on the bass upon rejoining Randy Bachman in a band called Union, which released a 1981 album titled On Strike. Bachman–Turner Overdrive then re-formed for a 1984 album and subsequent tour. Turner continued to perform in touring versions of B.T.O. through 2004, with the only new original material being released on the 1996 album Trial by Fire: Greatest and Latest. Turner's last performance on stage with any formation of B.T.O. was in 2004 with Randy Murray. The two were backed by members of the Little River Band because drummer Robbie Bachman and guitarist Blair Thornton were unable to attend B.T.O.'s last show. Turner is the only member of Bachman–Turner Overdrive to be on every album the band released.

"Turner's songwriting and nimble bass guitar work provide a groovy foundation, but his greatest strength is his voice. His ragged rumble is truly a voice built for rock & roll."

— Bret Adams, Allmusic.

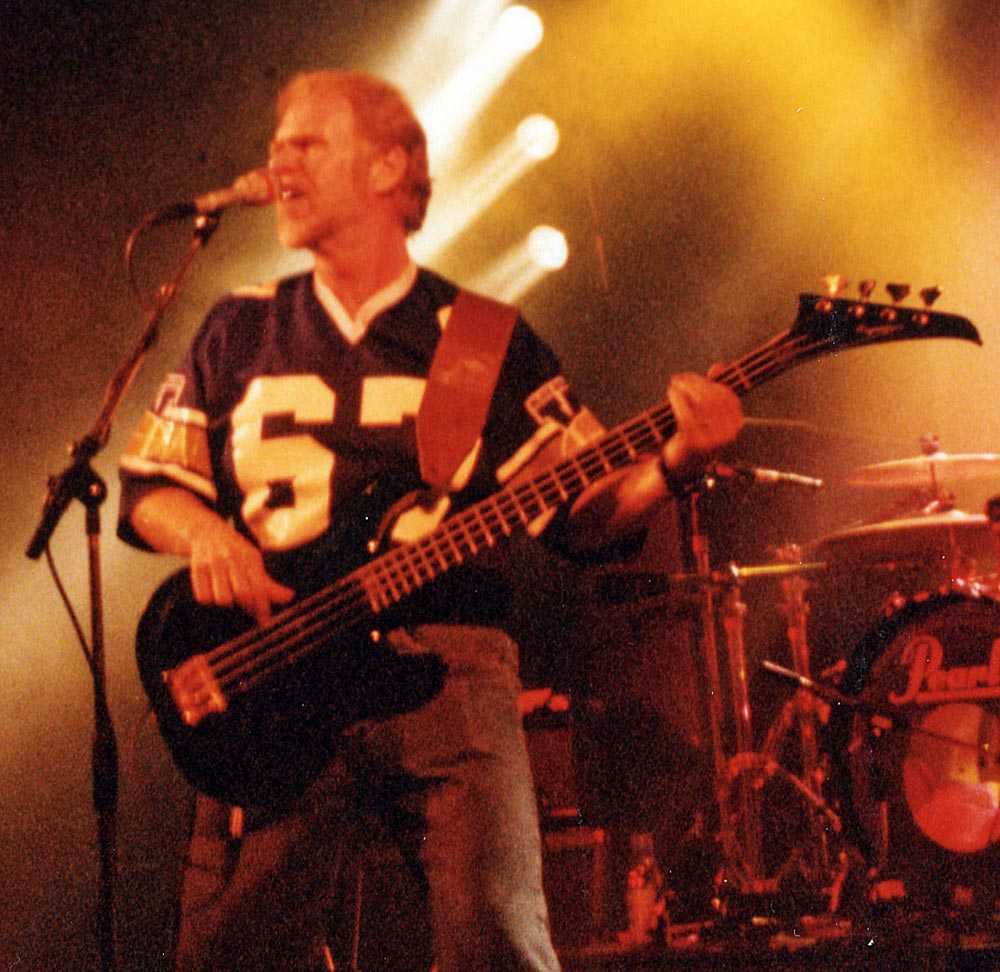
Turner performing in Örebro with B.T.O. in 1991

Turner is the lead vocalist on many of Bachman–Turner Overdrive's most popular tracks, including "Roll On Down the Highway," "Let It Ride," "Blue Collar," "Four Wheel Drive," "Not Fragile" and "Take It Like a Man." His songwriting credits include "Gimme Your Money Please," "Blue Collar," "Not Fragile," "Take It Like a Man" (with Blair Thornton), "Let It Ride" (with Randy Bachman) and "Roll On Down the Highway" (with Robbie Bachman). Turner also wrote and sang the lead on "Heartaches" (1979), the lone B.T.O. single to chart in the post-Randy Bachman era.

Turner recorded a solo song for the Animal Magnetism CD called "Walk With You" in 1996. The Animal Magnetism album was put together by Riff West. Other musicians that recorded songs for this album include Lonesome Dave Peverett of Foghat, Pat Travers, and Edgar Winter. In 2000, he made a voice appearance with Randy Bachman on an episode of The Simpsons.

In 2014, Turner and the rest of the Not Fragile-era Bachman-Turner Overdrive band members were inducted into the Canadian Music Hall of Fame.

== 2010 Bachman and Turner reunion ==
Turner reunited with Randy Bachman and recorded a new self-titled album that was released in September 2010 under the name "Bachman & Turner." Originally, Randy was developing a solo album and asked Fred to be a guest vocalist on one track called "Rock n’ Roll is the Only Way Out". However, after Fred sent back the track with his voice added, Randy was so impressed at how well the vocals fit the music, he decided to scrap his solo effort in favour of a full-on collaboration with Turner.

Bachman and Turner embarked on a 2010–11 world tour in support of their 2010 album, though numerous BTO songs were also played in their live set. The B&T world tour opened in June 2010 at the Sweden Rock Festival. The two continued on-and-off concert tours for several more years until, in March 2018, Randy Bachman announced that the 74-year-old Turner had amicably retired from touring.

== Awards, recognition and other achievements ==
- 1974: Juno Award winner, Most Promising Group of the Year
- 1975: Juno Award winner, Group of the Year
- 1976: Juno Award winner, Group of the Year
- 1978: Juno Award nomination, Group of the Year
- 2008: Guitar Magazine, Takin' Care of Business rated at number 10 in top 100 most covered songs
- 2009: iTunes, Takin' Care of Business is the most downloaded song on iTunes
- 2014: Canadian Music Hall of Fame, Inductee (as a member of Bachman-Turner Overdrive)

== Discography ==
All releases by Bachman-Turner Overdrive/BTO unless otherwise noted.

Studio albums

Year	Title	U.S. certification	Chart number
1972	Brave Belt II (Brave Belt)	–	–
1973	Bachman–Turner Overdrive	Gold	70
1973	Bachman–Turner Overdrive II	Gold	4
1974	Not Fragile	Gold	1
1975	Four Wheel Drive	Gold	5
1975	Head On	Gold	23
1977	Freeways	–	70
1978	Street Action	–	135
1979	Rock n' Roll Nights	–	165
1981	On Strike (Union)	–	–
1984	Bachman–Turner Overdrive	–	87
1996	Trial By Fire: Greatest and Latest	–	–
2010	Bachman & Turner (Bachman & Turner)	–	–

Live albums

Year	Title	U.S. certification	Chart number
1977	B.T.O. Live – Japan Tour	–	–
1986	Live! Live! Live!	–	–
1994	Best of Bachman–Turner Overdrive Live	–	–
1997	Motorcity Detroit USA Live	–	–
1998	King Biscuit Flower Hour: Bachman–Turner Overdrive	–	–
2012	Live at the Roseland Ballroom, NYC (Bachman & Turner)	–	–

Compilation albums

Year	Title	U.S. certification	Chart number
1976	Best of BTO (So Far)	Platinum	19
1983	You Ain't Seen Nothing Yet	–	–
1986	BTO's Greatest	–	–
1993	The Anthology	–	–
1998	Takin' Care of Business	–	–
2000	20th Century Masters: The Millennium Collection: The Best of Bachman–Turner Overdrive	–	–
2001	The Very Best of Bachman–Turner Overdrive	–	–
2005	Bachman–Turner Overdrive Gold	–	–

Singles

Year	Single	Chart	Position
1972	"Never Comin' Home" (Brave Belt)		–
1972	"Dunrobin's Gone" (Brave Belt)		_
1972	"Another Way Out" (Brave Belt)		_
1973	"Blue Collar"	Rock Singles	68
1974	"Let It Ride"	Pop Singles	23
1974	"Takin' Care of Business"	Pop Singles	12
1974	"You Ain't Seen Nothing Yet"	Pop Singles	1
1974	"Roll on Down The Highway"	Pop Singles	14
1975	"Hey You"	Pop Singles	21
1976	"Down to the Line"	Pop Singles	43
1976	"Take It Like a Man"	Pop Singles	33
1976	"Lookin' Out For #1"	Pop Singles	65
1976	"Lookin' Out For #1"	Adult Contemporary	15
1976	"Gimme Your Money Please"	Pop Singles	70
1977	"My Wheels Won't Turn"		–
1977	"Shotgun Rider"		–
1978	"Down The Road"		–
1979	"Jamaica"		–
1979	"Heartaches"	Pop Singles	60
1984	"Service with a Smile"		–
1984	"For The Weekend"	Pop Singles	83
1996	"House of the Rising Sun"		–
2010	"Rollin' Along" (Bachman & Turner)		–

== Filmography ==
Year	Type	Title
1974	Music Video	You Ain't Seen Nothin' Yet
1975	Documentary/ Live Shows	1975 Road Special
1983	Music Video	For The Weekend
1988	Live Show	'88 Reunion
1995	Documentary/ Live Shows	BTO: The Movie
2012	Live Show	Live at the Roseland Ballroom, NYC (Bachman & Turner)
2012	Motion Picture	The Campaign (Bachman & Turner)
