= Robbie Bachman =

Canadian drummer (1953–2023)

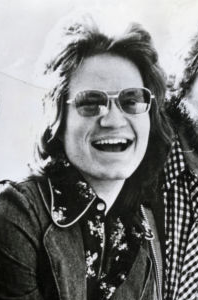
- Bachman in 1974

Background information
- Also known as: Rob Bachman
- Born: Robin Peter Kendall Bachman; February 18, 1953; Winnipeg, Manitoba, Canada
- Died: January 12, 2023 (aged 69) Vancouver, British Columbia, Canada
- Occupation: Drummer
- Years active: 1971–2005
- Formerly of: Brave Belt, Bachman-Turner Overdrive

Robin Peter Kendall Bachman (February 18, 1953 – January 12, 2023) was a Canadian drummer and the youngest brother of guitarist, singer and songwriter Randy Bachman. He was the original drummer for both the Brave Belt and Bachman–Turner Overdrive bands. He was most often credited as "Robbie" or "Rob" on the liner notes of Brave Belt and BTO albums.

== Early life ==
While growing up, Bachman practised the drums at home, often playing along with his older brother Randy Bachman.

== Bachman–Turner Overdrive ==
In 1971, Randy offered the Brave Belt drumming job to his then-18-year-old brother, and Robbie accepted. Other members of Brave Belt were Chad Allan and Fred Turner. Robbie co-wrote the song "Summer Soldier" for the 1972 Brave Belt II album. Later in 1972, another Bachman brother, Tim, joined Brave Belt after the departure of Allan.

When Brave Belt changed their name to Bachman–Turner Overdrive (BTO) in 1973, Robbie was credited with designing the BTO "gear" logo. BTO enjoyed a period of peak popularity between 1973 and 1976, releasing five Top 40 albums, six U.S. Top 40 singles, and eleven Top 40 singles in Canada. Robbie co-wrote (with Fred Turner) one of Bachman–Turner Overdrive's biggest hits, "Roll On down the Highway" (Billboard No. 14 and RPM No. 4 in 1975). He remained with BTO until late 1979, after their tour supporting the 1979 album Rock n' Roll Nights had ended.

In 1984, Robbie declined to join a reformation of BTO due to licensing issues with brother Randy. He also opposed Randy's decision to include Tim Bachman as the second guitarist, instead of Blair Thornton. He was replaced on that 1984 album and supporting tours by former Guess Who drummer Garry Peterson. Robbie later rejoined the Not Fragile line up of BTO for reunion tours lasting from 1988 until 1991, after which Randy Bachman left the band. Robbie and the rest of the group, with replacement guitarist/vocalist Randy Murray, toured as BTO until 2005, after which time he retired from music. The only new material to come from this line-up is found on the 1996 album Trial By Fire: Greatest & Latest.

In 2009, Fred Turner and Randy Bachman reunited and began recording a new album, which was released in September 2010 under the name "Bachman & Turner" to coincide with a world tour. Robin Bachman and Blair Thornton had brought a lawsuit against Randy Bachman in an effort to prevent him and Turner from touring under the Bachman–Turner Overdrive or BTO name.

On March 29, 2014, Robbie and the Not Fragile line-up of Bachman-Turner Overdrive were inducted into the Canadian Music Hall of Fame.

== Personal life and death ==
Bachman was the youngest brother of musician Randy Bachman, and was the uncle to Tal Bachman. He died on January 12, 2023, aged 69. He is survived by his wife Chrissy. His death was confirmed by Randy. His brother Tim died on April 28, 2023.

== Discography ==
=== With Bachman–Turner Overdrive ===
==== Studio albums ====
Title	Details
Bachman–Turner Overdrive	Released: May 17, 1973; Label: Mercury; Formats: LP, MC, 8-track
Bachman–Turner Overdrive II	Released: December 1973; Label: Mercury; Formats: LP, MC, 8-track
Not Fragile	Released: September 1974; Label: Mercury; Formats: LP, MC, 8-track
Four Wheel Drive	Released: May 1975; Label: Mercury; Formats: LP, MC, 8-track
Head On	Released: December 1975; Label: Mercury; Formats: LP, MC, 8-track
Freeways	Released: February 1977; Label: Mercury; Formats: LP, MC, 8-track
Street Action	Released: February 1978; Label: Mercury; Formats: LP, MC, 8-track
Rock n' Roll Nights	Released: March 1979; Label: Mercury; Formats: LP, MC, 8-track
Trial by Fire: Greatest & Latest	Released: 1996; Label: CMC; Formats: CD

==== Live albums ====
Title	Details
B.T.O. Japan Tour Live	Released: 1977; Label: Mercury; Formats: LP; Recorded at Nippon Budokan in 1977
Best of Bachman–Turner Overdrive Live	Released: January 24, 1994; Label: Curb; Formats: CD, MC; More recordings from Tallahassee in 1985
King Biscuit Flower Hour: Bachman–Turner Overdrive	Released: April 7, 1998; Label: King Biscuit Flower Hour; Formats: CD; Recorded in Chicago in 1974

==== Singles ====
Single	Year
"Gimme Your Money Please"/"Little Gandy Dancer"	1973
"Blue Collar"	1973
"Stayed Awake All Night" (UK-only release)	1973
"Down and Out Man" (Japan-only release)	1973
"Let It Ride"	1974
"Give It Time" (France-only release)	1974
"Takin' Care of Business"	1974
"You Ain't Seen Nothing Yet"	1974
"Not Fragile" (France-only release)	1974
"Roll On Down the Highway"	1975
"Hey You"	1975
"Quick Change Artist"	1975
"Down to the Line"	1975
"Take It Like a Man"	1976
"Away from Home" (UK-only release)	1976
"Lookin' Out for #1"	1976
"Gimme Your Money Please" (reissue)	1976
"My Wheels Won't Turn"	1977
"Life Still Goes On (I'm Lonely)"	1977
"Shotgun Rider"	1977
"Down, Down" (Germany-only release)	1977
"Down the Road"	1978
"Jamaica"	1979
"Heartaches"	1979
"Wooly Bully"	1989
"The House of the Rising Sun" (Europe-only release)	1996
