= King Biscuit Flower Hour: Bachman–Turner Overdrive =

Live album by Bachman–Turner Overdrive
- Released: April 7, 1998
- Recorded: March 8, 1974
- Genre: Rock
- Label: King Biscuit Flower Hour Records

Bachman–Turner Overdrive chronology
Trial by Fire: Greatest and Latest (1996)	King Biscuit Flower Hour: Bachman–Turner Overdrive (1998)	20th Century Masters – The Millennium Collection: The Best of Bachman–Turner Overdrive (2000)

Professional ratings
Review scores
Source	Rating
AllMusic	2.5/5 stars

King Biscuit: Bachman–Turner Overdrive is a live album recorded in Chicago on March 8, 1974, originally for broadcast on the King Biscuit Flower Hour. King Biscuit Records released a remastered version in 2004 as part of the King Biscuit Archive Series with the title "Greatest Hits Live".

== Track listing ==
1. "Let It Ride" (Randy Bachman, C.F. Turner)
2. "Give It Time" (C.F. Turner)
3. "Roll on Down the Highway" (Robbie Bachman, C.F. Turner)
4. "Welcome Home" (Randy Bachman)
5. "Takin' Care of Business" (Randy Bachman)
6. "Slow Down Boogie" (Randy Bachman)
7. "You Ain't Seen Nothing Yet" (Randy Bachman) (bonus studio track; alternate take)
8. Interview

== Personnel ==
- Randy Bachman – lead guitar, lead vocals
- C.F. Turner – bass, lead vocals
- Tim Bachman – 2nd lead guitar, backing vocals
- Robbie Bachman – drums
