= You Ain't Seen Nothing Yet (album) =

Compilation album by Bachman–Turner Overdrive
- Released: 1983
- Genre: Rock
- Label: Polygram

Bachman–Turner Overdrive chronology
Rock n' Roll Nights (1979)	You Ain't Seen Nothing Yet (1983)	Bachman–Turner Overdrive (1984)

You Ain't Seen Nothing Yet is a compilation album by Bachman–Turner Overdrive. It was released in 1983 by Polygram Records.

== Track listing ==
1. "You Ain't Seen Nothing Yet"
2. "Givin' It All Away"
3. "Rock Is My Life, And This Is My Song"
4. "Sledgehammer"
5. "Hey You"
6. "Flat Broke Love"
7. "She's Keeping Time"
8. "Free Wheelin'"
9. "Takin' Care of Business"
10. "Roll on Down the Highway"
11. "Down, Down"
12. "Four Wheel Drive"
