= Best of Bachman–Turner Overdrive Live =

Live album by Bachman–Turner Overdrive
- Released: January 25, 1994
- Genre: Rock
- Label: Curb

Bachman–Turner Overdrive chronology
The Anthology (Bachman–Turner Overdrive album) (1993)	Best of Bachman–Turner Overdrive Live (1994)	Trial by Fire: Greatest and Latest (1996)

Professional ratings
Review scores
Source	Rating
Allmusic	2/5 stars

Best of Bachman–Turner Overdrive Live is an album of concert material from a 1985 Bachman–Turner Overdrive performance in Tallahassee, Florida. The album was released on Curb Records in 1994, and should not be confused with All Time Greatest Hits Live, which was a 1990 re-release of the 1986 album Live Live Live, featuring other material sourced from the same concerts.

The album is notable for being one of three releases (two live, one studio) featuring a short-lived reunion line up of the band featuring founding members Randy Bachman, Tim Bachman, and C. F. "Fred" Turner, who had not played together since Tim's departure after the second BTO album. This lineup was joined by drummer Garry Peterson from Randy's old band, The Guess Who. The set includes versions of both The Guess Who's first hit, a cover of "Shakin' All Over", and their greatest hit, the original song "American Woman".

== Track listing ==
1. "Takin' Care of Business" (Randy Bachman) - 5:47
2. "Blue Collar" (C. F. Turner) - 6:55
3. "Gimme Your Money Please" (C. F. Turner) - 5:29
4. "American Woman" (Randy Bachman, Burton Cummings, Jim Kale, Garry Peterson) - 4:18
5. "Rock Is My Life, and This Is My Song" (Randy Bachman) - 5:11
6. "Shakin' All Over" (Johnny Kidd) - 4:15
7. "Four Wheel Drive" (Randy Bachman, Blair Thornton) - 4:54
8. "For the Weekend" (Randy Bachman) - 4:30
9. "Not Fragile" (C. F. Turner) - 4:32
10. "Let It Ride" (Randy Bachman, C. F. Turner) - 4:00

== Personnel ==
- Randy Bachman: Lead Guitar, Lead Vocals
- Tim Bachman: Guitar, Backing Vocals
- Garry Peterson: Drums
- C. F. "Fred" Turner: Bass, Lead Vocals
- Billy Chapman - Piano on "Takin' Care of Business"
