= Not Fragile =

Studio album by Bachman–Turner Overdrive
- Released: August 1974
- Recorded: 1974
- Studios: Kaye-Smith Studios, Seattle, Washington; Sound City, Van Nuys, California
- Genres: Hard rock; arena rock; blues rock
- Length: 36:14
- Label: Mercury
- Producer: Randy Bachman

Bachman–Turner Overdrive chronology
Bachman–Turner Overdrive II (1973)	Not Fragile (1974)	Four Wheel Drive (1975)

Singles from Not Fragile
- 1. "You Ain't Seen Nothing Yet" Released: September 1974; 2. "Roll on Down the Highway" Released: January 1975

Not Fragile is the third studio album by Canadian rock band Bachman–Turner Overdrive (BTO), released in 1974. It proved to be the group's most popular studio album, and reached No. 1 on both the US Billboard 200 and the Canadian RPM albums chart.

== Description ==
In a 1995 interview, Randy Bachman indicated that he thought that using the word "fragile" as a title for a rock album, as Yes had done with their 1971 album Fragile, was "strange." He thought that BTO music could be "dropped and kicked" without breaking, so, without intending any commentary about Yes, the band "tongue-in-cheek" called their next album Not Fragile.

The album marks the debut of guitarist Blair Thornton, who, unlike his predecessor Tim Bachman, is billed on the album liner notes as "second lead guitar". Thornton's dual-guitar work with Randy Bachman is a prominent feature on many Not Fragile tracks. "Roll On Down the Highway" and "You Ain't Seen Nothing Yet" were hit singles, with the latter hitting No. 1 on the Canadian and US singles charts in November 1974, receiving GOLD certification by the RIAA. Other cuts had significant airplay on FM rock radio. The album produced the only BTO singles to chart in the United Kingdom. "You Ain't Seen Nothing Yet" hit No. 2 on the UK charts in November 1974, and "Roll On Down the Highway" hit the No. 22 position in January 1975.

"You Ain't Seen Nothing Yet" was a leftover track that was not originally intended to be included on Not Fragile. It was only after Charlie Fach of Mercury Records heard the other eight tracks, and did not see hit single potential in any of them, that he asked if the band had anything else he could hear. They played him the leftover track and he assured them it was more radio-friendly than any of the others, convincing the band to add it to the album.

The Not Fragile album contains the only instrumental track in BTO's discography, a Blair Thornton composition called "Free Wheelin'". This track would appear as the B-side to the "You Ain't Seen Nothing Yet" single.

Not Fragile has gone on to achieve triple platinum status. Randy Bachman has called it the band's "crowning achievement," stating: "Not Fragile was when it all came together for us. We captured the album-oriented rock audience as well as the singles audience with that album. Not Fragile made BTO recognized around the world."

Professional ratings
Review scores
Source	Rating
Allmusic	link
Christgau's Record Guide	B
Tom Hull	A

== Track listing ==
No.	Title	Writer(s)	Lead vocals	Length
1.	"Not Fragile"	C.F. Turner	Turner	4:06
2.	"Rock Is My Life, and This Is My Song"	Randy Bachman	Randy Bachman	5:00
3.	"Roll on Down the Highway"	Turner, Rob Bachman	Turner	3:58
4.	"You Ain't Seen Nothing Yet"	Randy Bachman	Randy Bachman	3:54
5.	"Free Wheelin'"	Blair Thornton	instrumental	3:45
6.	"Sledgehammer"	Randy Bachman	Randy Bachman, Turner	4:34
7.	"Blue Moanin'"	Turner	Turner	3:44
8.	"Second Hand"	Randy Bachman	Randy Bachman	3:24
9.	"Givin' It All Away"	Thornton	Randy Bachman, Turner	3:49

== Personnel ==
Bachman–Turner Overdrive

- Randy Bachman – vocals, guitars
- C. F. Turner – vocals, bass guitar
- Blair Thornton – guitars, backing vocals
- Robbie Bachman – drums, percussion

Guest musician

- Frank Trowbridge – slide guitar on "Blue Moanin'"

Production

- Producer: Randy Bachman
- Engineer: Mark Smith
- Assistant engineer: Buzz Richmond
- Mixing assistant: Richard Dashut
- Mastering: Tom "Curly" Ruff
- Recording studio: Kaye-Smith Studios, Seattle
- Mixed at: Sound City Studios, Los Angeles
- Equipment: John Austin and Greg "Weasel" Morgan
- Design: Joe Kotleba
- Art direction: Jim Ladwig
- Photography: John Brott, Tom Zamiar

== Charts ==
=== Weekly charts ===
Chart (1974–75)	Peak position
Australian Albums (Kent Music Report)	2
Austrian Albums (Ö3 Austria)	8
Canada Top Albums/CDs (RPM)	1
Dutch Albums (Album Top 100)	15
German Albums (Offizielle Top 100)	6
New Zealand Albums (RMNZ)	17
Swedish Albums (Sverigetopplistan)	2
UK Albums (Official Charts)	12
US Billboard 200	1

=== Year-end charts ===
Chart (1975)	Position
Australian Albums (Kent Music Report)	13
German Albums (Offizielle Top 100)	21

=== Singles ===
Year	Single	Chart	Position
1974	"You Ain’t Seen Nothing Yet"	U.S. Billboard Pop Singles	1
1974	"You Ain’t Seen Nothing Yet"	Canada RPM Singles	1
1975	”Roll On Down the Highway"	U.S. Billboard Pop Singles	14
1975	”Roll On Down the Highway"	Canada RPM Singles	4

== Certifications and sales ==
Region	Certification	Certified units/sales
Canada (Music Canada)	Platinum	100,000^{^}
United Kingdom (BPI)	Silver	60,000^{^}
United States (RIAA)	Gold	500,000^{^}
^{^} Shipments figures based on certification alone.
