= Street Action =

Studio album by BTO
- Released: February 1978
- Studios: Can-Base, Mushroom
- Genres: Rock, hard rock
- Length: 40:15
- Label: Mercury
- Producer: BTO

BTO chronology
| Freeways (1977) | Street Action (1978) | Rock n' Roll Nights (1979) |

Singles from Street Action
- 1. "Down the Road" Released: 1978

Street Action is the seventh studio album by Canadian rock band Bachman–Turner Overdrive (BTO), released in 1978. It was the first BTO album released after the 1977 departure of co-founder Randy Bachman. As part of an agreement upon leaving, Randy requested the rights to the full Bachman surname to use for his pending solo album, then sold the rights to "BTO" and its trademarks to the remaining three band members. Thus, the band was required to release its next two albums (the remaining two under their contract with Mercury Records) using only BTO as the band name, and not Bachman-Turner Overdrive.

BTO replaced Randy Bachman with bassist/vocalist Jim Clench, who had most recently been in April Wine. Fred Turner, who played bass on all previous BTO releases, moved to rhythm guitar, and he shared lead vocal duties with Clench. Street Action had a distinctively heavier sound than the previous two BTO studio albums (Head On and Freeways).

The album was reissued in 2016 as part of the Bachman-Turner Overdrive Classic Albums Box Set.

== Composition and production ==
All songs on Street Action are credited to BTO in the liner notes. However, Fred Turner stated that some songs were written by Blair Thornton and himself for Freeways, while Jim Clench also brought in several of his own compositions.

The album was recorded at Mushroom Studios in Vancouver, British Columbia.

== Critical reception ==
Professional ratings
Review scores
| Source | Rating |
|---|---|
| AllMusic | 2/5 stars |
| The Encyclopedia of Popular Music | 1/5 stars |
| The Rolling Stone Album Guide | 1/5 stars |

Street Action was met with negative reviews.

Rolling Stone wrote that "C.F. Turner suffers from Bachman’s ailment of being unable to sing a cliché with enough conviction to make you forget it’s a cliché."

== Track listing ==
(All songs by Clench, Thornton, Turner and Robbie Bachman)

1. "I'm in Love" – 3:52 (lead vocal: C.F. Turner)
2. "Down the Road" – 4:03 (lead vocal: Jim Clench)
3. "Takes a Lot of People" – 4:06 (lead vocal: Turner)
4. "A Long Time for a Little While" – 3:52 (lead vocal: Clench)
5. "Street Action" – 4:16 (lead vocal: Turner)
6. "For Love" – 4:39 (lead vocal: Turner)
7. "Madison Avenue" – 6:01 (lead vocal: Turner)
8. "You're Gonna Miss Me" – 4:07 (lead vocal: Clench)
9. "The World Is Waiting for a Love Song" – 5:04 (lead vocal: Turner)

== Personnel ==
- Robbie Bachman – drums, percussion
- Jim Clench – bass, vocals
- Blair Thornton – lead guitar
- C.F. Turner – guitar, vocals

with:

- John Hall – piano on "I'm In Love"
- Tom Keenlyside – saxophone on "Madison Avenue"

Production

- Engineer: Rolf Henneman
- Assistant engineer: Jeff Tolman
- Art direction: James OMara
- Photography: James OMara

== Charts ==
| Chart (1978) | Peak position |
|---|---|
| Canada Top Albums/CDs (RPM) | 62 |
| US Billboard 200 | 130 |
