= Freeways (album) =

Studio album by Bachman–Turner Overdrive
- Released: February 1977
- Recorded: 1976–1977
- Studios: Phase One, Scarborough, Ontario
- Genre: Rock
- Length: 39:20
- Label: Mercury
- Producer: Randy Bachman

Bachman–Turner Overdrive chronology
B.T.O. Live – Japan Tour (1977)	Freeways (1977)	Street Action (1978)

Singles from Freeways
- 1. "My Wheels Won't Turn" Released: 1977; 2. "Life Still Goes On (I'm Lonely)" Released: 1977; 3. "Shotgun Rider" Released: 1977

Professional ratings
Review scores
Source	Rating
AllMusic	3/5 stars
The Rolling Stone Album Guide	2/5 stars

Freeways is the sixth studio album by Canadian rock band Bachman–Turner Overdrive, released in 1977. It was the last album that Randy Bachman would be a part of with BTO until seven years later when a "reunion" Bachman-Turner Overdrive studio album was made and released in 1984. This is also the last studio album to be made with the band's classic and most successful Not Fragile line up. It was the first BTO studio album to become a commercial failure, featuring the first BTO single that did not chart ("My Wheels Won't Turn"). Randy Bachman wrote every song besides "Life Still Goes On (I'm Lonely)", while only two of the album's eight songs featured Fred Turner as the lead vocalist.

Many of BTO's core fans did not like the album, as it was not the heavy, guitar driven rock n' roll that BTO was known for. Turner was reportedly so unhappy with this album that he wouldn't allow a straight-on picture of himself to be used on the cover, saying he felt like a "side man." He expressed anger that Randy had added strings to the lone Turner composition ("Life Still Goes On") without his permission, and went so far as to state that Freeways should have been a Randy Bachman solo album.

Years later, Randy would agree that the Freeways album was rushed to the studio, and that the band should have taken some down time, allowing them to develop more song ideas. He did however, mention "Down Down", "Shotgun Rider", and "My Wheels Won't Turn" as songs that were worthy of inclusion on any BTO album, singling out the Duane Allman-esque guitar solo on "My Wheels Won't Turn" as one of Blair Thornton's finest moments on record.

This album was one of the last albums to reach the charts by any formation of BTO. The 8-track tape version of this album has the distinction of being one of the few 8-tracks that is arranged exactly like the album, with no song breaks.

== Track listing ==
All songs written by Randy Bachman, with lead vocals by Randy Bachman, except where noted

1. "Can We All Come Together" – 5:54
2. "Life Still Goes On (I'm Lonely)" (C.F. Turner) – 3:55 (Vocal C.F. Turner)
3. "Shotgun Rider" – 5:17
4. "Just for You" – 4:43
5. "My Wheels Won't Turn" – 5:20
6. "Down, Down" – 4:18
7. "Easy Groove" – 5:00
8. "Freeways" – 4:53 (Vocal C.F. Turner)

== Personnel ==
- Randy Bachman - vocals, acoustic and electric guitars, lap steel guitar, 6 string bass
- C.F. Turner - vocals, bass
- Blair Thornton - guitar, background vocals
- Robbie Bachman - drums, percussion

Production

- Producer: Randy Bachman
- Engineer: George Semkiw
- Assistant engineer: Mick Walsh, Mark Wright
- Art direction: Jim Ladwig
- Design: Joe Kotleba
- Photography: Bruce Cole
- Cover photo: Kenneth McGowan

== Charts ==
Chart (1977)	Peak position
Canada Top Albums/CDs (RPM)	34
Swedish Albums (Sverigetopplistan)	41
US Billboard 200	70

== Certifications ==
Region	Certification	Certified units/sales
Canada (Music Canada)	Gold	50,000^{^}
^{^} Shipments figures based on certification alone.
