= Brave Belt =

Canadian country rock band

- Origin: Winnipeg, Manitoba, Canada
- Genres: Country rock, soft rock
- Years active: 1971-1972
- Label: Reprise Records
- Past members: Randy Bachman; Chad Allan; Robbie Bachman; Fred Turner; Tim Bachman

Brave Belt was a Canadian rock band from Winnipeg, Manitoba originally consisting of Randy Bachman (guitar/vocals), his former Guess Who bandmate, Chad Allan (vocals/keyboards), and Randy's brother Robbie (drums). Randy also provided bass tracks for the recording of the band's first album, Brave Belt (Reprise Records, 1971). C. F. "Fred" Turner was added shortly after as bassist for the supporting concerts.

The band made the Canadian Top 40 with the minor hit "Crazy Arms, Crazy Eyes," which peaked at No. 35 in November 1971. However, they missed the U.S. charts completely.

== History ==
In 1972, Turner became the lead vocalist for the Brave Belt II album. Allan left the band after the recording was completed. During the supporting concerts for Brave Belt II, Tim Bachman was added as a second guitarist. Despite the changes, Brave Belt II sold poorly and the band struggled to book live shows. In a 1974 Rolling Stone interview, Randy estimated there were losses of about $150,000 in 1971-72 ($923,000 in 2020 dollars), with himself personally absorbing about 60% of the loss, as he was paying the other band member salaries from his Guess Who royalties.

Although dropped from the Reprise label, the Brave Belt II lineup (C. F. Turner with Randy, Tim and Robbie Bachman) recorded and shopped around a demo that was supposed to be a Brave Belt III album. New management convinced them to change their name − they eventually settled on Bachman–Turner Overdrive.

Thus, the eponymous first Bachman–Turner Overdrive album is essentially Brave Belt III, the album that was rejected by Reprise Records. Bachman had contacted many record labels to get the Brave Belt III tapes signed. Charlie Fach at Mercury eventually listened to the tapes and liked what he heard. Bachman listened to some suggestions, remixed and re-edited the tapes, and the band recorded at least two new songs. The result was the first Bachman–Turner Overdrive album for Mercury, released in May 1973.

== Legacy ==
Though Brave Belt is relatively unknown some 40 years later, the importance of the band was summed up by Randy Bachman in a 2001 interview:

It was an innocent time of soul-searching. Nobody would play with me when I left The Guess Who. I was completely black-listed. I couldn't get a decent musician to play with me, except Chad Allan, who had also been in The Guess Who and left. He and I bonded together, and I might not have gotten started without him, even though he left sometime after that first album. Those [Brave Belt] albums are so important to me because, for the first time, I was making my own music, paying for it, finding strengths in it, and going through the process of finding the right music for the record. It led to me becoming a stronger producer for BTO.

Brave Belt I and Brave Belt II were re-released on a single CD March 17, 2009.

== Albums ==
=== Brave Belt - Reprise Records - 1971 ===
==== Track listing ====
Side one

1. "Crazy Arms, Crazy Eyes" - (Randy Bachman) - 2:44
2. "Lifetime" - (Randy Bachman) - 1:53
3. "Waitin' There For Me" - (Randy Bachman) - 3:17
4. "I Am The Man" - (Chad Allan) - 4:03
5. "French Kiss" - (Chad Allan, Rob Matheson) - 3:46
6. "It's Over" - (Randy Bachman) - 3:05

Side two

7. "Rock And Roll Band" - (Chad Allan) - 3:52
8. "Wandering Fantasy Girl" - (Chad Allan) - 2:50
9. "I Wouldn't Trade My Guitar For A Woman" - (Chad Allan) - 1:47
10. "Holy Train" - (Chad Allan) - 3:05
11. "Anyday Means Tomorrow" - (Randy Bachman) - 3:02
12. "Scarecrow" - (Chad Allan, Rob Matheson) - 5:38

==== Personnel ====
- Chad Allan - piano, lead (4, 5, 8, 10, 12), co-lead (1, 2, 7, 9) and backing (11) vocals, accordion, rhythm guitar, mandolin
- Randy Bachman - lead guitar, lead (3, 6, 11), co-lead (1, 2, 7, 9) and backing vocals, bass, herzog
- Robbie Bachman - drums (1–8, 10, 11), percussion

Additional Personnel

- Wally Didduck - fiddle
- Ron Halldorson - pedal steel guitar
- Billy Mac - drums (9, 12)

=== Brave Belt II - Reprise Records - 1972 ===
==== Track listing ====
Side one

1. "Too Far Away" - (Randy Bachman) - 3:38
2. "Dunrobin's Gone" - (Chad Allan, Bob Ericson) - 3:10
3. "Can You Feel It" - (C. F. Turner) - 2:36
4. "Put It In A Song" - (C. F. Turner, Tim Bachman) - 3:34
5. "Summer Soldier" - (Chad Allan, Randy Bachman, Robbie Bachman) - 3:23
6. "Goodbye, Soul Shy" - (C. F. Turner) - 3:45

Side two

7. "Never Comin' Home" - (Randy Bachman) - 3:40
8. "Be A Good Man" - (C. F. Turner) - 2:51
9. "Long Way 'Round" - (credited to "Charles Charles"—collective pseudonym of C. F. Turner & Randy Bachman) - 2:15
10. "Another Way Out" - (Chad Allan, Randy Bachman) - 3:30
11. "Waterloo Country" - (Chad Allan) - 5:00

==== Personnel ====
- Randy Bachman - guitars, backing vocals
- Chad Allan - keyboards, backing vocals, lead vocals (tracks 2 & 10)
- C. F. Turner - bass, lead vocals (except tracks 2 & 10)
- Robbie Bachman - drums, backing vocals, percussion

==== Additional personnel ====
- Tim Bachman - guitars, backing vocals (touring only)
- Dunrobin Avenue is a street in EAST KILDONAN, Winnipeg, Manitoba

The album reached #36 in Canada.

== Canadian chart singles ==
- "Rock and Roll Band" (1971) - #64
- "Crazy Arms, Crazy Eyes" (1971) - #35
- "Never Comin' Home" (1972) - #57
- "Dunrobin's Gone" (1972) - #58 #5 CAN AC
- "Another Way Out" (1972)

== Bibliography ==
- "Bachman Forms A New Group". Billboard. March 27, 1971. p. 55.
