= Rock n' Roll Nights =

Studio album by BTO
- Released: February 1979
- Recorded: 1978–1979, Mushroom Studios, Vancouver, Canada
- Genre: Rock, soft rock
- Length: 36:50
- Label: Mercury
- Producer: BTO, Jim Vallance

BTO chronology
Street Action (1978)	Rock n' Roll Nights (1979)	You Ain't Seen Nothing Yet (1983)

Singles from Rock n' Roll Nights
- 1. "Jamaica" Released: 1979; 2. "Heartaches" Released: 1979

Professional ratings
Review scores
Source	Rating
AllMusic	2/5 stars
The Rolling Stone Album Guide	1/5 stars

Rock n' Roll Nights is the eighth studio album by Canadian rock band BTO, released in 1979. This record was one of three BTO albums that did not feature co-founder Randy Bachman. Rock n' Roll Nights is also one of the two albums from this band to feature Jim Clench, formerly of April Wine. This LP generated worldwide sales of only about 350,000 copies, though a single from the album called "Heartaches" managed to reach #60 on the U.S. charts and cracked the Top 40 in Canada. Rock n' Roll Nights is a rare find on CD, as it was released only for a short time on that format in 1990.

The band used multiple outside songwriters on Rock n' Roll Nights, including Jim Vallance of Prism and Bryan Adams (who penned the song, "Wastin' Time"). C.F. Turner and Jim Clench would later appear as session musicians for Adams' debut album in 1980, on which Adams recorded his own version of "Wastin' Time".

The band played two songs — "Heartaches", the last BTO single to chart, and "Jamaica"—live on American Bandstand in February 1979 to support the Rock n' Roll Nights album release. Producer Vallance played the piano for the TV taping of "Heartaches". During an interview segment on the show, Dick Clark discusses concerns with the band about the increasing and dominating popularity of disco music at the time. Many consider disco and the decline of guitar-based hard rock in the late 1970s to be among the reasons that both Street Action and Rock n' Roll Nights sold so poorly.

After touring to support Rock n' Roll Nights through much of 1979, BTO officially disbanded in early 1980. They would not reform until 1983, with Randy Bachman back in the group.

The song "Rock and Roll Hell" would later be re-recorded, with new verses and a new arrangement, by Kiss in 1982, for the album Creatures of the Night. In 2024, Bryan Adams released a recording of the Kiss version of the song as a limited-edition double A-side seven-inch single via his independent label, Bad Records.

The song "Jamaica" would be re-recorded, with new words, as "Kristina" by Rick Springfield on his 1982 album Success Hasn't Spoiled Me Yet.

== Track listing ==
1. "Jamaica" (Jim Vallance) – 4:08 (Lead vocal: Jim Clench)
2. "Heartaches" (C.F. Turner) – 3:51 (Lead vocal: C.F. Turner)
3. "Heaven Tonight" (Jim Clench, Blair Thornton) – 3:03 (Lead vocal: Clench)
4. "Rock and Roll Nights" (Clench) – 5:30 (Lead vocal: Clench)
5. "Wastin' Time" (Bryan Adams) – 3:28 (Lead vocal: Clench)
6. "Here She Comes Again" (Clench, Thornton, Vallance) – 3:00 (Lead vocal: Turner)
7. "End of the Line" (Clench) – 3:25 (Lead vocal: Clench)
8. "Rock and Roll Hell" (Vallance) – 4:06 (Lead vocal: Turner)
9. "Amelia Earhart" (David Simmonds, Vallance) – 6:19 (Lead vocal: Clench)

== Personnel ==
- C. F. Turner - rhythm guitar, lead and backing vocals
- Blair Thornton - lead guitar
- Jim Clench - bass, lead and backing vocals
- Robbie Bachman - drums, percussion

with:

- Jim Vallance - all keyboards, occasional rhythm and slide guitars, percussion, backing vocals

Production

- Producers: Jim Vallance
- Engineers: John Brand, Rolf Henneman
- Assistant engineer: Mike Donegani
- Mixing: Jim Vallance
- Art direction, photography: James O'Mara

== Charts ==
Chart (1979)	Peak position
US Billboard 200	165
