= Four Wheel Drive (album) =

Studio album by Bachman–Turner Overdrive
- Released: May 1975
- Studios: Sounds Interchange, Toronto
- Genre: Rock
- Length: 33:32
- Label: Mercury
- Producer: Randy Bachman

Bachman–Turner Overdrive chronology
Not Fragile (1974)	Four Wheel Drive (1975)	Head On (1975)

Singles from Four Wheel Drive
- 1. "Hey You" Released: May 1975; 2. "Quick Change Artist" Released: 1975

Professional ratings
Review scores
Source	Rating
AllMusic	3.5/5 stars
Christgau's Record Guide	C+

Four Wheel Drive is the fourth studio album by Canadian rock band Bachman–Turner Overdrive, released in 1975 (see 1975 in music). It peaked at No. 1 in Canada on the RPM national albums chart on October 4 and again on October 18, 1975 while hitting No. 5 on the U.S. Pop Albums chart. The most popular single from the album, "Hey You," was written by Randy Bachman. It reached No. 1 in Canada, holding the top position on the RPM national singles chart for two weeks in June, 1975, and No. 21 on the U.S. charts. Some reviews stated the song was directed at Bachman's former Guess Who bandmate, Burton Cummings. "Quick Change Artist" was released as a single in Canada only, and reached No. 13 on the RPM chart.

According to liner notes supplied with the BTO compilation CD The Anthology, Mercury Records had wanted a quick follow-up to the highly successful Not Fragile album. Thus, Four-Wheel Drive was recorded in six days, much of it containing material that was left over from the Not Fragile sessions.

== Track listing ==
No.	Title	Writer(s)	Lead Vocals	Length
1.	"Four Wheel Drive"	Randy Bachman, Thornton	Turner	4:20
2.	"She's a Devil"	Thornton, Turner	Turner	4:43
3.	"Hey You"	Randy Bachman	Bachman	3:34
4.	"Flat Broke Love"	Turner	Turner	3:56
5.	"She's Keepin' Time"	Randy Bachman	Bachman	4:09
6.	"Quick Change Artist"	Randy Bachman, Turner	Turner	3:19
7.	"Lowland Fling"	Randy Bachman, Thornton	Bachman	5:20
8.	"Don't Let the Blues Get You Down"	Turner	Turner	4:11

== Personnel ==
- Randy Bachman – vocals, lead guitars, acoustic guitar
- C.F. Turner – vocals, bass guitar
- Blair Thornton – lead guitars, slide guitar, background vocals
- Robbie Bachman – drums, percussion, background vocals

== Production ==
- Producer: Randy Bachman
- Engineer: Mark Smith
- Mastering: Tom "Curly" Ruff
- Director: Bruce Allen
- Art direction: Jim Ladwig
- Design: Joe Kotleba
- Cover construction: Parvis Sadighian
- Art Design: Ryan Walsh, Alex Does
- Photography: John Brott, Tom Zamiar

== Charts ==
Chart (1975)	Peak position
Australian Albums (Kent Music Report)	10
Canada Top Albums/CDs (RPM)	1
Finnish Albums (The Official Finnish Charts)	23
German Albums (Offizielle Top 100)	19
New Zealand Albums (RMNZ)	5
Norwegian Albums (VG-lista)	10
Swedish Albums (Sverigetopplistan)	42
US Billboard 200	5

== Certifications ==
Region	Certification	Certified units/sales
Canada (Music Canada)	Gold	50,000^{^}
United States (RIAA)	Gold	500,000^{^}
^{^} Shipments figures based on certification alone.
