= Randy Murray =

- Born: Charles Randall Murray; 9 December 1955 (age 70); Calgary, Alberta, Canada
- Genres: Rock music
- Occupation: Musician
- Instruments: Guitar, vocals
- Years active: 1970s–2017
- Formerly of: Bachman–Turner Overdrive

Charles Randall "Randy" Murray (born 9 December 1955) is a Canadian rock guitarist and vocalist, and was a long-serving member of Bachman–Turner Overdrive. From 1989 to 1992 he taught music, did custom recordings and held a radio talk show in Prince George, British Columbia. From the late 1970s to 1989, Murray was a fixture on the B.C./Alberta music scene. He was a member of the BTO line-up that was fronted by Tim Bachman while there were two versions of the group in the late 1980s, and again (this time along with Blair Thornton, Robbie Bachman, and Fred Turner) from 1991 until 2005, making this line-up the longest enduring of all the various Bachman-Turner Overdrive, B.T.O. and BTO incarnations. He began full time work as the Communications and Development Associate at the Anglican Diocese of New Westminster’s Cathedral Church in Vancouver, January 2006 and was subsequently appointed Communications Officer for the Anglican diocese July 15, 2009, retiring December 15, 2023. Murray continued performing around his hometown of Vancouver sporadically but retired from public performance in 2017.

== Accomplishments ==
- 2017 - Released the album Aunt Mary's Take-Out with long time friend Rachel Cambrin under the name "Ordinary Lies"
- 1988 - Formed the Surreal McCoys, a classic rock band who were resident at Vancouver's Roxy club.
- 1987/1988 - Toured with Tim Bachman, performing BTO tunes.
- 1985 - Released the EP Warm Hands/Cold Heart under the name Vox Phantom.
- 1984-1989 - Collaborated with Dave Reimer in the Invaders, a classic rock band.
- Early 1980s - Member of David Raven, who released an EP on the Radioactive label.
- Early 1980s - Member of Ennis-Murray Band, with Paul Ennis, Mike Rogers, Jeff Sugarman
- Late 1970s - Member of X-Static, with Paul Ennis and Ron MacDonald

== Sources ==
- "BTO official website" Retrieved 23 Jan 2007.
- "Randy Murray" Retrieved 23 Jan 2007.
- "CanadianBands.com" Retrieved 26 Oct 2015.
