= Bachman–Turner Overdrive (1973 album) =

Studio album by Bachman–Turner Overdrive
- Released: May 17, 1973
- Recorded: 1972–1973
- Studios: RCA Studios, Toronto
- Genres: Hard rock, boogie rock
- Length: 34:57
- Label: Mercury
- Producers: Bachman–Turner Overdrive, Randy Bachman

Bachman–Turner Overdrive chronology
Bachman–Turner Overdrive (1973)	Bachman–Turner Overdrive II (1973)

Singles from Bachman–Turner Overdrive
- 1. "Gimme Your Money Please"/"Little Gandy Dancer" Released: June 1973; 2. "Blue Collar" Released: 1973

Bachman–Turner Overdrive is the self-titled debut studio album by Canadian rock band Bachman–Turner Overdrive, released in 1973. It was originally to be titled Brave Belt III, following the Brave Belt II album, made by the previous line-up of the group, called Brave Belt.

The album did not produce a true hit single ("Blue Collar" reached No. 68 on the U.S. Billboard charts and No. 21 in Canada), but it was certified "Gold" by the RIAA in October 1974, largely pulled up by strong sales of Bachman–Turner Overdrive II, which had gone Gold five months earlier. "Gimme Your Money Please" and "Little Gandy Dancer" were released as a double A-side single in Canada only. After the release of Bachman–Turner Overdrive II, this first album was often referred to as "BTO 1".

== Critical reception ==
Professional ratings
Review scores
Source	Rating
AllMusic	2.5/5 stars
Christgau's Record Guide	B+
The Rolling Stone Record Guide	2/5 stars

Record World described "Gimme Your Money Please" as "a hard hitting rocker."

Something Else Reviews said that "Blue Collar" "flirts with something seemingly not in the Bachman-Turner Overdrive wheelhouse: Jazz. The key here is the guitar solo. It's all Bachman. Randy gets a million points for style on this one."

== Track listing ==
All lead vocals by Fred Turner, except where indicated.

No.	Title	Writer(s)	Lead Vocals	Length
1.	"Gimme Your Money Please"	C.F. Turner		4:41
2.	"Hold Back the Water"	Randy Bachman, Rob Bachman, Kirk Kelly		5:06
3.	"Blue Collar"	C.F. Turner		6:10
4.	"Little Gandy Dancer"	Randy Bachman		4:22
5.	"Stayed Awake All Night"	Randy Bachman	Randy and Tim Bachman	4:07
6.	"Down and Out Man"	Tim Bachman, Randy Bachman*	Tim Bachman	3:12
7.	"Don't Get Yourself in Trouble"	Randy Bachman	Turner and Randy	4:54
8.	"Thank You for the Feelin'"	C.F. Turner		4:07

- *Album liner notes credited the songwriting of "Down and Out Man" to Tim Bachman and R.B. Charles. The latter name was later revealed to be a rearrangement of Randolph Charles Bachman (Randy).

== Personnel ==
- C.F. Turner – vocals, bass guitar
- Randy Bachman – lead guitar, vocals
- Tim Bachman – rhythm guitar, vocals
- Robbie Bachman – drums, percussion

with

- Barry Keane – congas on "Blue Collar"
- Will MacCalder – piano
- Garry Peterson – drums, percussion, backing vocals

Production

- Producers: Bachman–Turner Overdrive, Randy Bachman
- Engineers: Dave Slagter, Mark Smith
- Mastering: Tom "Curly" Ruff
- Technician: Allan Moy
- Design: Robbie Bachman
- Art direction: Jim Ladwig
- Photography: Ed Caraeff
- Booklet design: Joe Kotleba
- Cover sculpture: Parviz Sadighian
- Photography: Tom Zamiar

== Charts ==
Chart (1973)	Peak position
Canada Top Albums/CDs (RPM)	9
US Billboard 200	70

== Certifications ==
Region	Certification	Certified units/sales
Canada (Music Canada)	Platinum	100,000^{^}
United States (RIAA)	Gold	500,000^{^}
^{^} Shipments figures based on certification alone.
