= Blue Collar (Bachman–Turner Overdrive song) =

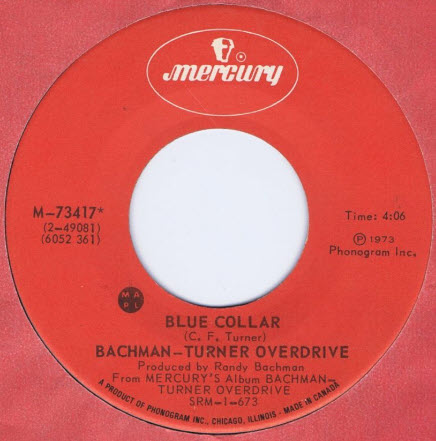
- Blue Collar 45 RPM single

Single by Bachman–Turner Overdrive

from the album Bachman–Turner Overdrive
- B-side: "Hold Back the Water"
- Released: August 1973
- Genre: rock, pop rock, jazz rock
- Songwriter: C. F. Turner
- Producer: Randy Bachman

Bachman–Turner Overdrive singles chronology
"Gimme Your Money Please" / "Little Gandy Dancer" (1973)	"Blue Collar" / "Hold Back the Water" (1973)	"Let it Ride" (1974)

"Blue Collar" is a song by the Canadian rock band Bachman–Turner Overdrive. It was written by Fred Turner, who also sings the lead vocal. It appears as the third track on their 1973 eponymous debut album. It was the second single from the album released in Canada, following "Gimme Your Money Please"/"Little Gandy Dancer", but the first to be released in the US.

== Background ==
The song's lyrics contrast the "9 to 5" white-collar worker with the night shift blue-collar worker (represented by the singer). The singer notes that the stressed white-collar worker's "restless face is no longer mine," adding that the night shift worker can "rest my feet while the world's in heat."

== Release ==
The 1973 single peaked at #21 on the Canadian RPM charts, making it the first of BTO's eleven top 40 singles in Canada. It peaked at #68 on the US Billboard charts during the final week of 1973, and was a popular AOR radio song, as evidenced by regional performance in metros like Columbus, Ohio (#15) and Chicago (#23). The song runs 6:10 on the album, while the single version is edited to 4:06.

== Reception ==
Bob Freska from Something Else Reviews writes: "Written and sung by Fred Turner, 'Blue Collar' is a mellow and generally optimistic take on being an off hours working stiff. More importantly, it flirts with something seemingly not in the Bachman-Turner Overdrive wheelhouse: Jazz. It's laid back. It has washy ride cymbals and some very non-rock guitar chords and intervals. The key here is the guitar solo. It's all Bachman. Randy gets a million points for style on this one."

The Vinyl District review by Michael H. Little calls the song "a mid-tempo and syncopated slice of ersatz jazz fusion that's about as blue collar as Oscar Wilde. The fact that I once operated a jackhammer makes me nine times more blue collar than this tune, which features lots of jazzbo guitar vamping, and percussion that could just as well be by Santana."

== Personnel ==
According to the liner notes of Bachman–Turner Overdrive.

- C.F. Turner – bass guitar, lead vocals
- Randy Bachman – lead guitar
- Tim Bachman – rhythm guitar
- Robbie Bachman – drums, percussion
- Barry Keane – congas
- Will MacCalder – piano

== Track listing ==
1973 single
No.	Title	Length
1.	"Blue Collar"	4:06
2.	"Hold Back the Water"	2:40
Total length:		6:46

== Charts ==
Chart (1973)	Peak position
Canada Top Singles (RPM)	21
US Billboard Hot 100	68
