= Head On (Bachman–Turner Overdrive album) =

Studio album by Bachman–Turner Overdrive
- Released: December 1975
- Recorded: 1975
- Studios: RCA Studios, Toronto
- Genre: Rock
- Length: 42:28
- Label: Mercury
- Producer: Randy Bachman

Bachman–Turner Overdrive chronology
Four Wheel Drive (1975)	Head On (1975)	Best of B.T.O. (So Far) (1976)

Singles from Head On
- 1. "Take It Like a Man" Released: January 1976; 2. "Lookin' Out for #1" Released: 1976

Professional ratings
Review scores
Source	Rating
AllMusic	link
Christgau's Record Guide	B−

Head On is the fifth studio album by Canadian rock band Bachman–Turner Overdrive, released in December 1975. On the original vinyl release, the outer album cover expanded into a 24x24 inch poster featuring all four members of the band at that time. It was re-released in 2003 on Repertoire Records in conjunction with Mercury Records. The re-release featured the bonus track "Down to the Line", which was released as a single in 1975 but not included on the vinyl nor the original Mercury CD release of Head On.

The single "Take It Like a Man" reached #33 on the US Billboard Hot 100 charts and received significant airplay at that time. It was the last of the band's six U.S Top 40 singles. Pioneering rocker Little Richard played piano on the recording. Near the end of the song, C.F. Turner tells him to "play it Richard", and he does, with heavy expression. Another single from this album, the jazzy "Lookin' Out for #1", did not crack the Top 40 on the U.S. pop charts, but reached #15 on the Adult Contemporary chart, receiving heavy airplay upon its release on both conventional rock and soft rock stations.

"Away from Home" was also released as a single in the UK only, with "Down To The Line" on the B-side. It did not chart.

== Commercial performance ==
By February 1976, Head On had sold 900,000 copies in the US. It was a top five album in Canada, hitting the #3 position on February 21, 1976. It was the last non-compilation BTO album to reach the Top 40 on the US Billboard 200, hitting the #23 position on March 6, 1976.

== Track listing ==
No.	Title	Writer(s)	Lead Vocals	Length
1.	"Find Out About Love"	Randy Bachman	Randy Bachman	4:40
2.	"It’s Over"	C.F. Turner, Blair Thornton	Turner	3:18
3.	"Average Man"	Randy Bachman, Robbie Bachman	Randy Bachman	4:00
4.	"Woncha Take Me for a While"	Turner, Randy Bachman	Turner	5:05
5.	"Wild Spirit"	Turner, Thornton	Turner	2:59
6.	"Take It Like a Man"	Turner, Thornton	Turner	3:40
7.	"Lookin’ Out for #1"	Randy Bachman	Randy Bachman	5:20
8.	"Away from Home"	Turner	Turner	4:30
9.	"Stay Alive"	Randy Bachman	Randy Bachman	4:12
10.	"Down to the Line (*)"	Randy Bachman, Kim Fowley, Mark Anthony, Vincent Furnier	Randy Bachman	4:01

- (*) Available only on the 2003 rerelease on CD and the 2013 Japanese Mini LP Remastered CD (as non-album single of 1975)

The Randy Bachman-penned "West Coast Turnaround" was recorded during the Head On sessions but was not released until 2013, when it appeared as a bonus track on the Bachman-Turner Overdrive 40th Anniversary album.

== Personnel ==
- Randy Bachman - vocals, guitar
- Blair Thornton - guitar
- C.F. Turner - vocals, bass guitar
- Robbie Bachman - drums, percussion, backing vocals on "Down to the Line"

Additional musicians

- Little Richard - piano (6, 9)
- Barry Keane - congas

== Production ==
- Producer: Randy Bachman
- Engineer: Mark Smith

== Charts ==
Chart (1975–1976)	Peak position
Australian Albums (Kent Music Report)	54
Canada Top Albums/CDs (RPM)	3
New Zealand Albums (RMNZ)	7
Swedish Albums (Sverigetopplistan)	8
US Billboard 200	23

== Certifications ==
Region	Certification	Certified units/sales
Canada (Music Canada)	Platinum	100,000^{^}
United States (RIAA)	Gold	500,000^{^}
^{^} Shipments figures based on certification alone.
