= Gimme Your Money Please =

- 1973 Spain single sleeve

Single by Bachman–Turner Overdrive

from the album Bachman–Turner Overdrive
- A-side: "Little Gandy Dancer"
- Released: June 1973
- Genre: Hard rock, boogie rock
- Songwriter: C. F. Turner
- Producer: Randy Bachman

Bachman–Turner Overdrive singles chronology
"Gimme Your Money Please" / "Little Gandy Dancer" (1973)	"Blue Collar" (1973)

"Gimme Your Money Please" is the debut single by the Canadian rock band Bachman–Turner Overdrive. It was written by Fred Turner, who also sings the lead vocal. It appears as the first track on their 1973 debut album Bachman–Turner Overdrive. It was also the first single from the album, as a double A-side with "Little Gandy Dancer". The song is about someone getting mugged, with the victim thinking "wasn't that strange" that the mugger asked "please."

== Release ==
The 1973 single charted in Canada only. The single was reissued in 1976 to promote the compilation The Best of B.T.O. (So Far), with the 1975 song "Four-Wheel Drive" as the B-side. It charted in both the US and Canada.

== Reception ==
Goldmine magazine critic Martin Popoff ranked it number 3 in his list of the top 20 "pounding-est" sounding BTO songs, recalling that he had fond memories of spinning it. Record World described the song as a "hard hitting rocker." In a review for the Bachman–Turner Overdrive album on AllMusic, music critic Joe Viglione stated that it is "one of C.F. Turner's best contributions to the Bachman-Turner Overdrive catalog." Cash Box described the 1976 single release as being "done up with integrity. The lead vocal is growled out in syncopated time to the hard driving rhythm, and the result is a class A progressive single."

== Track listings ==
All info is according to the Netherlands' chart website.

1973 7-inch single
No.	Title	Length
1.	"Gimme Your Money Please"	3:50
2.	"Little Gandy Dancer"	4:16
Total length:		8:06

1976 7-inch single #1
No.	Title	Length
1.	"Gimme Your Money Please"	3:24
2.	"Four Wheel Drive"	3:16
Total length:		6:40

1976 7-inch single #2
No.	Title	Length
1.	"Gimme Your Money Please"	3:50
2.	"Lookin' Out for Number 1"	3:50
Total length:		7:40

== Personnel ==
According to the liner notes of Bachman–Turner Overdrive.

- C.F. Turner – bass, lead vocals and backing vocals
- Randy Bachman – lead guitar, backing vocals
- Tim Bachman – rhythm guitar, backing vocals
- Robbie Bachman – drums, percussion

== Charts ==
=== 1973 issue ===
Chart (1973)	Peak position
Canada Top Singles	45

=== 1976 reissue ===
Chart (1976)	Peak position
Canada Top Singles	47
US Hot 100 (Billboard)	70
