= Bachman–Turner Overdrive II =

Studio album by Bachman–Turner Overdrive
- Released: December 17, 1973
- Recorded: 1973
- Studios: Kaye-Smith Studios, Seattle, Washington
- Genres: Hard rock, boogie rock
- Length: 39:07
- Label: Mercury
- Producer: Randy Bachman

Bachman–Turner Overdrive chronology
Bachman–Turner Overdrive (1973)	Bachman–Turner Overdrive II (1973)	Not Fragile (1974)

Singles from Bachman–Turner Overdrive II
- 1. "Let It Ride" Released: April 12, 1974; 2. "Takin' Care of Business"" Released: May 6, 1974

Professional ratings
Review scores
Source	Rating
AllMusic	3/5 stars
Christgau's Record Guide	B+

Bachman–Turner Overdrive II is the second album by Canadian rock band Bachman–Turner Overdrive, released in 1973. The album reached #4 in the US and #6 in Canada.

Bachman–Turner Overdrive II includes BTO's first Top 40 single, "Let It Ride", which peaked at #23 on the US Billboard Hot 100. The album's second and bigger hit single is "Takin' Care of Business". Though it never cracked the Top 10 on the US singles charts (reaching #12 in 1974), it became one of the band's most enduring anthems and stayed on the Billboard chart for 20 weeks. Both singles reached #3 on the Canadian RPM chart.

== Track listing ==
No.	Title	Writer(s)	Lead Vocals	Length
1.	"Blown"	R. Bachman, T. Bachman	T. Bachman	4:18
2.	"Welcome Home"	R. Bachman	R. Bachman	5:29
3.	"Stonegates"	Turner	Turner	5:35
4.	"Let It Ride"	R. Bachman, Turner	Turner	4:27
5.	"Give It Time"	Turner	Turner	5:44
6.	"Tramp"	R. Bachman, Robbie Bachman	R. Bachman	4:02
7.	"I Don't Have to Hide"	T. Bachman	T. Bachman	4:22
8.	"Takin' Care of Business"	R. Bachman	R. Bachman	4:50

== Personnel ==
Bachman-Turner Overdrive

- Randy Bachman - lead guitar, vocals
- Tim Bachman - guitar, vocals
- Fred Turner - bass, vocals
- Robbie Bachman - drums, percussion

Guest musician

- Norman Durkee - piano on "Takin' Care of Business"

Production

- Producer: Randy Bachman
- Engineer: Buzz Richmond
- Assistant engineer: Mark Sterling
- Mastering: Tom "Curly" Ruff
- Equipment: John Austin
- Design: John Youssi
- Art direction: Jim Ladwig
- Photography: Dave Roels

== Charts ==
Chart (1973–1975)	Peak position
Australian Albums (Kent Music Report)	55
Canada Top Albums/CDs (RPM)	6
German Albums (Offizielle Top 100)	34
US Billboard 200	4

== Certifications ==
Region	Certification	Certified units/sales
Canada (Music Canada)	Platinum	100,000^{^}
United States (RIAA)	Gold	500,000^{^}
^{^} Shipments figures based on certification alone.
