= Bachman–Turner Overdrive (1984 album) =

Studio album by Bachman–Turner Overdrive
- Released: September 1984
- Studio: At Little Mountain Sound Studios,
- Genre: Hard rock
- Length: 40:16
- Label: Compleat
- Producers: Randy Bachman, Bachman–Turner Overdrive

Bachman–Turner Overdrive chronology
You Ain't Seen Nothing Yet (1983)	Bachman–Turner Overdrive (1984)	Live Live Live (1986)

Singles from Bachman–Turner Overdrive
- 1. "Service with a Smile" Released: 1984; 2. "For the Weekend" Released: 1984; 3. "My Sugaree" Released: 1984

Professional ratings
Review scores
Source	Rating
AllMusic	2/5 stars

Bachman–Turner Overdrive is the ninth studio album and second eponymous album by Canadian rock band Bachman–Turner Overdrive, released in 1984. It is the last BTO studio album of original material to date and the only one without Robbie Bachman on drums. He disputed some of the agreements for the recording and reunion, including the choice of Tim Bachman instead of Blair Thornton, and declined to join. Garry Peterson, who was Randy Bachman's bandmate in The Guess Who, plays drums on the album. The album was originally released on Compleat Records, but it is currently in print under the Sun Record label. The leadoff song, "For the Weekend", was released as a single and also included an accompanying music video. Reaching #83 in the Billboard Hot 100, "For the Weekend" was the last BTO single to chart by any formation of the band.

== Track listing ==
1. "For the Weekend" (R. Bachman) – 4:20
2. "Just Look at Me Now" (T. Bachman, Turner) – 4:38
3. "My Sugaree" (R. Bachman) – 3:47
4. "City's Still Growin'" (Turner) – 5:44
5. "Another Fool" (R. Bachman) – 5:29
6. "Lost in a Fantasy" (R. Bachman) – 4:11
7. "Toledo" (Turner) – 4:12
8. "Service with a Smile" (R. Bachman) – 4:21

== Personnel ==
- Randy Bachman - guitar, vocals
- C. F. Turner - bass guitar, vocals
- Tim Bachman - rhythm guitar, background vocals
- Garry Peterson - drums, percussion, background vocals

=== Additional personnel ===
- Will MacCalder - piano
- Denise McCann - background vocals

== Production ==
- Producers: Randy Bachman, Bachman–Turner Overdrive
- Engineers: Patrick Glover, Dave Slagter
- Mixing: Dave Slagter
- Digital mastering: Hollis Flatt, MC Rather
- Digital transfers: Don Powell
- Original design concept: Jim Ladwig
- Illustrations: John Youssi

== Charts ==
Chart (1984)	Peak position
Canada Top Albums/CDs (RPM)	85
US Billboard 200	191
