= Take It Like a Man (Bachman–Turner Overdrive song) =

- 7" single cover

Single by Bachman–Turner Overdrive

from the album Head On
- B-side: "Woncha Take Me for a While"
- Released: January 1976
- Recorded: 1975
- Genre: Blues rock
- Length: 3:40 (album); 3:14 (single)
- Label: Mercury
- Songwriters: Fred Turner, Blair Thornton
- Producer: Randy Bachman

Bachman–Turner Overdrive singles chronology
"Down to the Line" (1975)	"Take It Like a Man" (1976)	"Lookin' Out for #1" (1976)

"Take It Like a Man" is a 1975 song written by Fred Turner and Blair Thornton, and first recorded by Canadian rock group Bachman–Turner Overdrive (BTO) for their December 1975 album Head On. The lead vocal is provided by Turner. Released in January 1976, it was the first and more successful of two singles issued from the LP, the second being the jazzy "Lookin' Out for #1", which missed the U.S. Top 40 but gained some airplay on soft rock stations. "Take It Like a Man" was the sixth and last single by BTO to reach the Top 40 on the U.S. Billboard Hot 100, peaking at No. 33 on March 13, 1976. On the Canadian RPM charts, it reached the No. 24 position.

== Background ==
"Take It Like a Man" is a blues-rock song that features a prominent piano accompaniment played by pioneering rocker Little Richard, including a piano solo that closes the song. Just before the solo starts, Fred Turner can be heard shouting, “Play it, Richard!" Little Richard also played piano on the Head On song “Stay Alive”, which was not released as a single.

== Reception ==
Cash Box said it's "an excellent tune, and with a fat rhythm section" and with "some great rifting from the guitars, a soulful vocal, and a little rag-rock piano." Record World said that "this tune stands up to the best [the band has] done."

== Personnel ==
- Randy Bachman – rhythm & lead guitars
- Fred Turner – bass, lead vocal
- Blair Thornton – rhythm & lead guitars
- Robbie Bachman – drums, percussion
- Little Richard – piano

== Track listing ==
1976 single
No.	Title	Length
1.	"Take It Like a Man"	3:14
2.	"Woncha Take Me for a While"	5:05
Total length:		8:19

== Charts ==
Chart (1976)	Peak position
Canada RPM	24
US Billboard Hot 100	33
