= Jamaica (song) =

Single by Bachman–Turner Overdrive

from the album Rock n' Roll Nights
- Released: 1979
- Recorded: 1978
- Genre: Rock
- Length: 4:08
- Label: Mercury
- Songwriter(s): Jim Vallance
- Producer(s): Jim Vallance

"Jamaica" is a song by Canadian rock group Bachman–Turner Overdrive that appears on the 1979 album Rock n' Roll Nights. It features Jim Clench on lead vocals. It was written by well-known songwriter Jim Vallance. It was released as a single but did not chart. The song, along with "Heartaches," was played live on American Bandstand in February 1979 to support the Rock n' Roll Nights album release.

Using different lyrics, Rick Springfield remade the song under the title "Kristina" on his 1982 album Success Hasn't Spoiled Me Yet.
