= Down to the Line =

- 7" single cover

Single by Bachman–Turner Overdrive
- B-side: "She’s a Devil"
- Released: 1975
- Recorded: 1975
- Genre: Rock
- Length: 3:54
- Label: Mercury
- Songwriters: Randy Bachman, Kim Fowley, Mark Anthony, Vincent Furnier
- Producer: Randy Bachman

Bachman–Turner Overdrive singles chronology
"Hey You" (1975)	"Down to the Line" (1975)	"Take It Like a Man" (1976)

"Down to the Line" is a 1975 song written by Randy Bachman, with Kim Fowley, Mark Anthony and Vincent Furnier (better known as Alice Cooper). It was first recorded by Canadian rock group Bachman–Turner Overdrive (BTO) as a non-album single and released in November 1975, just ahead of their December 1975 album Head On. The lead vocal is provided by Randy Bachman. It was the only non-album single released by BTO, though it was included on some later releases of the Head On album in CD format. "Down to the Line" just missed the U.S. Top 40, peaking at #43 on the Billboard Hot 100 on January 3, 1976. The single fared much better in Canada, peaking at #13 on the Canadian RPM charts.

As the Head On album had yet to be released, the B-side of “Down to the Line” is the song “She’s a Devil” from the band's earlier 1975 album Four Wheel Drive.

The original single credits only Randy Bachman as the song's composer. Mark Anthony and Kim Fowley later sued Bachman over the chorus riff of "Down to the Line", which is identical to the main riff in the Alice Cooper song "Escape", composed by Fowley, Anthony and Cooper for the Welcome to My Nightmare album. As a result of the lawsuit, settled out of court, the three additional writing credits were added to Bachman's on subsequent releases of "Down to the Line" (compilation albums and re-issues of Head On).

Cash Box called it a "simple hooksong that courses through the veins of the listener and overtakes the ability to say no." Record World said that "Marked by a handclapping rhythm and a thrust of power chording, this new effort shows that [the group is] still one of the country's premier rock bands."

== Track listing ==
1975 single
No.	Title	Length
1.	"Down to the Line"	3:54
2.	"She's a Devil"	4:29
Total length:		8:23

== Charts ==
Chart (1976)	Peak position
Canada RPM	13
US Billboard Hot 100	43
