= Lookin' Out for Number 1 (Bachman–Turner Overdrive song) =

1975 song by Bachman–Turner Overdrive

"Lookin' Out for #1"

Single by Bachman–Turner Overdrive

from the album Head On
- B-side: "Find Out About Love"
- Released: 1976
- Recorded: 1975
- Genre: Rock, soft rock, jazz rock
- Length: 3:50 (single); 5:19 (album)
- Label: Mercury
- Songwriter(s): Randy Bachman
- Producer(s): Randy Bachman

Bachman–Turner Overdrive singles chronology
"Take It Like a Man" (1976)	"Lookin' Out for #1" (1976)	"Gimme Your Money Please" (1976)

"Lookin' Out for #1" is a 1975 song written by Randy Bachman and first recorded by Canadian rock group Bachman–Turner Overdrive (BTO) for their December, 1975 album Head On. The lead vocal is provided by Randy Bachman. Released in early 1976, it was the second of two singles from the LP to be issued in North America, following "Take It Like a Man".

A departure from BTO's earlier heavy rock releases, "Lookin' Out for #1" was strongly influenced by Randy’s jazz upbringing and tutelage under Lenny Breau. In his book Randy Bachman’s Vinyl Tap Stories, Randy stated: "The chord progression on ‘Lookin' Out for #1’ came from the Mickey Baker Guitar Book that Lenny Breau had told me about when I was a teenager. It was a chance for me to stretch out a bit on the guitar. It’s still among my most requested live songs, and made the transition to my jazz career."

"Lookin’ Out for #1" spent six weeks on the U.S. Billboard Hot 100, reaching as high as #65 the weeks of May 15 and 22, 1976. On the Billboard Adult Contemporary chart, however, it was a Top 20 hit, peaking at #15 on May 29, 1976. As a result, the song got significant airplay on soft rock radio stations, a first for BTO. Cash Box said that it "is a beautiful acoustic ballad with some evidently Spanish influence" and "the best thing this band has done in a long time." Record World said that "a firm jazz lilt is established by Randy's dexterous guitar styling."

There are multiple versions of the "Lookin’ Out for #1" single. The initial U.S. and Canadian releases have an edited version of the song, running 3:50. Some versions released in Europe have the full album version of the song, running 5:19. Both of these releases had "Find Out About Love" as the B-side. A version released in late 1976 has "Take It Like a Man", the band’s prior hit from the Head On album, on the B-side.

== Track listing ==
1976 single (original release)
No.	Title	Length
1.	"Lookin' Out for #1"	3:50
2.	"Find Out About Love"	4:40
Total length:		8:30

== Charts ==
Chart (1976)	Peak position
US Billboard Hot 100	65
US Billboard Easy Listening	15
Canada RPM Top 100	40
