= Roll On down the Highway =

"Roll On Down the Highway"
- 7" single cover

Single by Bachman–Turner Overdrive

from the album Not Fragile
- B-side: "Sledgehammer"
- Released: January 1975
- Recorded: 1974
- Genre: Rock; blues rock; hard rock; heavy metal
- Length: 3:56
- Label: Mercury
- Songwriters: Fred Turner, Robbie Bachman
- Producer: Randy Bachman

Bachman–Turner Overdrive singles chronology
"You Ain't Seen Nothing Yet/Free Wheelin'" (1974)	"Roll On Down the Highway" (1975)	"Hey You" (1975)

"Roll On Down the Highway" is a song written by Fred Turner and Robbie Bachman, first recorded by Canadian rock group Bachman–Turner Overdrive (BTO) for their 1974 album Not Fragile. The lead vocal is provided by Turner.

Turner and Randy Bachman had originally been contracted by Ford to write a song for the automotive company's commercials, but Ford never picked up any of their compositions. Robbie Bachman later helped develop one of Turner's ideas into a Top 20 hit. "Roll On down the Highway" peaked at No. 14 on the US Billboard Hot 100 on March 1, 1975. It reached No. 8 on the Cash Box Top 100 singles, and No. 4 on the Canadian RPM chart, and gave the band their second—and final—hit in the United Kingdom, reaching No. 22 in the UK Singles Chart.

The song was the second of two singles issued from the Not Fragile LP, and was the follow-up to the group's greatest hit, "You Ain't Seen Nothing Yet".

Billboard described "Roll On down the Highway" as a "driving rocker combining simplicity of sound with vocal and instrumental skill." Cash Box called it a "great car radio tune," saying "gruff and gritty, they strike the primal chord and growl out the lyrics with gusto." Record World called it "interstate, international, intergalactic rollin' rock!"

== Chart performance ==
=== Weekly charts ===
Chart (1975)	Peak position
Australia (KMR)	80
Canada RPM Top Singles	4
Germany	18
New Zealand (RIANZ)	20
UK Singles Chart Top 100	22
US Billboard Hot 100	14
US Cash Box Top 100	8

=== Year-end charts ===
Chart (1975)	Rank
Canada	54
US (Joel Whitburn's Pop Annual)	133

== Track listing ==
1975 single
No.	Title	Length
1.	"Roll On Down the Highway"	3:56
2.	"Sledgehammer"	4:29
Total length:		8:25

== Cover versions ==
In 2005, California-based girl group The Donnas covered "Roll On down the Highway" for the soundtrack of the Lindsay Lohan movie Herbie: Fully Loaded.
