= Hey You (Bachman–Turner Overdrive song) =

- 7" single cover

Single by Bachman–Turner Overdrive

from the album Four Wheel Drive
- B-side: "Flat Broke Love"
- Released: May 1975
- Recorded: 1975
- Genre: Rock
- Length: 3:33
- Label: Mercury
- Songwriter: Randy Bachman
- Producer: Randy Bachman

Bachman–Turner Overdrive singles chronology
"Roll on Down the Highway" (1975)	"Hey You" (1975)	"Down to the Line" (1975)

"Hey You" is a song written by Randy Bachman and first recorded by Canadian rock group Bachman–Turner Overdrive (BTO) for their 1975 album Four Wheel Drive. It was the first and more successful of two singles issued from the LP, the second being "Quick Change Artist", which was released in Canada only.

== Background ==
The lead vocal is provided by Randy Bachman. There were rumours circulated that Randy Bachman directed the lyrics of "Hey You" at former bandmate Burton Cummings, who had publicly stated that Bachman would never make it in the music business again following his departure from The Guess Who. Randy confirmed the rumours in interviews years later, stating: "I deserved to gloat a bit after all the mud Burton had slung at me."

Cash Box said it has elements of earlier Bachman-Turner Overdrive singles "Let It Ride" and "You Ain't Seen Nothing Yet" and contains "the stuttering vocals of Randy Bachman, and some more heavy guitar chording."

== Track listing ==
1975 single
No.	Title	Length
1.	"Hey You"	3:33
2.	"Flat Broke Love"	3:56
Total length:		7:29

== Charts ==
"Hey You" was the second BTO single to hit number 1 on the Canadian RPM chart, following "You Ain't Seen Nothing Yet". It held the top position on the RPM chart for two weeks in June 1975. The song peaked at number 21 on the US Billboard Hot 100 on July 5, 1975.

Chart (1975)	Peak position}
Austria	14
Canada RPM Top Singles	1
New Zealand	10
US Billboard Hot 100	21
West Germany	9
