= Bachman–Turner Overdrive =

Canadian rock band

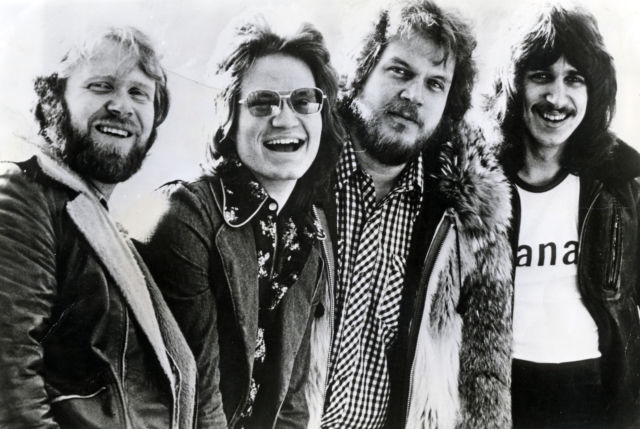
- BTO in 1974 (L–R: Fred Turner, Robbie Bachman, Randy Bachman, Blair Thornton)

Background information
- Also known as: B.T.O. Brave Belt (1971–1972)
- Origin: Winnipeg, Manitoba, Canada
- Genres: Rock; hard rock; boogie rock
- Works: Discography
- Years active: 1971–1980; 1983–2005; 2023–present
- Labels: Mercury; MCA; Curb
- Spinoffs: Bachman & Turner
- Spinoff of: Brave Belt
- Members: C. F. Turner; Randy Bachman; Tal Bachman; Brent Howard; Koko Bachman; Lance LaPointe
- Past members: Robbie Bachman; Tim Bachman; Blair Thornton; Jim Clench; Garry Peterson; Chad Allan; Billy Chapman; Randy Murray; Mick Dalla-Vee; Marc LaFrance
- Website: www.btoband.com

Bachman–Turner Overdrive, often abbreviated as BTO, is a Canadian rock band formed in Winnipeg, Manitoba, in 1971 under its original name "Brave Belt" by brothers Randy Bachman, Robbie Bachman, and Tim Bachman, along with fellow Winnipeg musician Fred Turner. Their 1970s catalogue included seven top-40 albums (five in the US) and 11 top-40 singles in Canada (six in the US). In Canada, they have six certified platinum albums and one certified gold album. In the US, they have five certified gold albums and one certified platinum album. The band has sold over 30 million albums worldwide and has fans affectionately known as "gearheads" (derived from the band's gear-shaped logo). Many of their songs, including "Let It Ride", "You Ain't Seen Nothing Yet", "Takin' Care of Business", "Hey You", and "Roll on Down the Highway", still receive regular play on classic rock stations.

The original line-up consisted of Randy Bachman (lead guitar, lead vocals), Fred Turner (bass guitar, lead vocals), Tim Bachman (guitar, vocals), and Robbie Bachman (drums, percussion, backing vocals). This line-up released two albums in 1973. The second and most commercially successful line-up featured Blair Thornton (lead guitar), in place of Tim Bachman. This line-up released four albums between 1974 and 1977, including two that reached the top five on the US pop charts, as well as the band's only US number-one single ("You Ain't Seen Nothing Yet").

After the band went into a hiatus in 2005, Randy Bachman and Fred Turner reunited in 2009 to tour and collaborate on a new album. In 2010, they played the halftime show at the Grey Cup in Edmonton. The two continued to work together until Turner retired from music in 2018.

On March 29, 2014, the classic Not Fragile line-up reunited for the first time since 1991 to mark Bachman–Turner Overdrive's induction into the Canadian Music Hall of Fame, and participated in a tribute performance of "Taking Care of Business". On January 12, 2023, drummer and co-founder Robbie Bachman died at age 69, followed three months later by his brother, rhythm guitarist Tim on April 28, 2023 (aged 71).

On June 29, 2023, Randy Bachman announced that Bachman–Turner Overdrive would reunite to tour once again, with Turner making appearances on select dates. The rest of the group is made up of Bachman's son, Tal, as well as his backing band used for solo tours and Bachman and Turner.

== History ==
=== Early history: Brave Belt (1971–1973) ===
After finding success with the Guess Who, Randy Bachman left at the height of the group's popularity in July 1970, citing health issues and lifestyle differences with the other band members. He recalled being labelled "a lunatic and a loser" and being told "nobody wanted to work with me." The exception was Chad Allan, former Guess Who lead singer, who had left that band four years before Randy. The two agreed to explore a musical project, and Randy then turned to family. The result was the band Brave Belt, formed in Winnipeg in 1971 with the additions of Randy's brother Robin "Robbie" Bachman on drums, and Gary Bachman acting as band manager. Brave Belt's self-titled first album, which had Randy playing both lead guitar and bass, was composed primarily of country-rock songs. Randy stated Allan and he chose country-rock because of the popularity of crossover bands such as Buffalo Springfield and also because Randy did not want his new band to sound like a knock-off of the Guess Who. The album did not sell particularly well, with only one single ("Crazy Arms, Crazy Eyes") managing to crack the Canadian RPM top 40 (number 35). The record label still wanted Brave Belt to tour, so Randy, at the suggestion of Neil Young, hired fellow Winnipeg bassist/vocalist C. F. ("Fred") Turner to perform in the band's scheduled gigs.

Turner was soon asked to be a full-time member and sing lead for the recording of Brave Belt II in 1972. Chad Allan appeared as a vocalist on two Brave Belt II songs, but left the band shortly after the album's recording. During the tour to support this album, another Bachman sibling, Tim Bachman, was added as a second guitarist, because the band believed its three-piece arrangement was too restrictive. Brave Belt II also failed to achieve any notable chart success, and in mid-1972, their supporting tour was cancelled halfway through. Turner's influence had started to make itself felt, though, as he composed five songs for the Brave Belt II album and sang lead on 9 of the album's 11 songs. Brave Belt II had a harder, more riff-heavy sound than its predecessor, complemented by Turner's throaty, powerful voice.

According to Randy Bachman's autobiography, Bachman–Turner Overdrive's sound was born at a Lakehead University gig in Thunder Bay, Ontario, shortly after Allan's departure. A promoter, disheartened with Thursday night crowd reactions to Allan's country-flavoured songs, which the band was still playing, decided to sack Brave Belt for the Friday and Saturday night shows and bring in a more rock-oriented replacement from Toronto. When the replacement band did not materialize, he begged Brave Belt to stay on and play a set of classic rock cover songs. As the band played songs like "Proud Mary", "Brown Sugar", and "All Right Now", the dance floor filled up, and according to Randy, "We instantly saw the difference between playing sit-down music people could talk over and playing music they would jump out of their seats and dance to."

Certain that Reprise Records would drop Brave Belt from their label, but not wanting to wait, Randy Bachman asked for and received a release from their contract. Randy then emptied his own bank account to finance another set of recordings with the Brave Belt II line-up, and began to shop around the next album. Said Randy in 1974, "I went to A&M, Epic, Atlantic, Columbia, Asylum – you name it. A week later, I'd get letters saying 'Dear Randy, We pass.' We're thinking of calling our greatest hits album We Pass and printing all those refusals on the jacket. I've got all 22 of them".

The band eventually landed a deal with Mercury Records, one which Randy proclaimed as a pure stroke of luck. In April 1973, Charlie Fach of Mercury Records returned to his office after a trip to France to find a stack of demonstration tapes waiting on his desk (which was after Fach's assistant had already sent one refusal letter to Randy). Wanting to start completely fresh, he took a trash can and slid all the tapes into it except one, which missed the can and fell onto the floor. Fach picked up the tape and noticed Bachman's name on it. He remembered talking to him the previous year and had told Bachman that if he ever put a demo tape together to send it to him. Coincidentally, Mercury had just lost Uriah Heep and Rod Stewart to other labels, and Fach was looking for new rock acts to replace them. Fach called Bachman, and Randy describes the conversation from there:

I could hear "Gimme Your Money Please" playing in the background, and that was the first song on the tape. Back then, you sent out two 7 1/2-inch reels of your album, an A-side and a B-side, and that was side one, cut one. He said, "Randy, this is fabulous. Is the rest of the album like this?" And I said, "Yeah, it's all just good ol', dancing rock-and-roll." So he said, "Well, I have a meeting with my A&R people, but as far as I'm concerned, this is great and I want to sign it."

=== New band name: Bachman-Turner Overdrive ===
At this point, the band's demo tape was still called Brave Belt III. Fach convinced the band that a new name was needed, one that capitalized on the name recognition of the band members. The band had already mulled over using their surnames (à la Crosby, Stills, Nash & Young). While on their way back from a gig in Toronto, the group had spotted a copy of a trucker's magazine called Overdrive while dining at the Colonial Steak House in Windsor, Ontario. After this, Turner wrote "Bachman–Turner Overdrive" and the initials "B.T.O." on a napkin. The rest of the band decided the addition of "Overdrive" was the perfect way to describe their music.

BTO released their eponymous first album in May 1973. The album broke through in the US via border towns such as Detroit and Buffalo and stayed on the charts for many weeks, despite lacking a hit single. The Turner-penned "Blue Collar" reached number 21 on the Canadian RPM charts, but stalled at number 68 on the US chart. The album's eventual success was the result of the band's relentless touring. Reportedly, Fach had agreed to put this album on the Mercury label only if the band would promote it with a heavy concert schedule. Wherever the band was getting significant airplay, Bachman–Turner Overdrive immediately traveled there, regardless of the tour routing, to build momentum.

One such opportunity occurred in St. Louis. Fred Turner said, "We got a call from radio station KSHE that was putting on a benefit. They wanted a band to headline that nobody heard of because the headline acts they had booked got bigger offers and weren't coming. We had the BTO I album out then, so they at least had something to play and make it look like we were big. They started playing our record every hour, every cut off the album, across six states – 150,000 watts. The record company called and said, 'What the hell's happening? We shipped 10,000 records to St. Louis in one week!' We got there and it was an outdoor drive-in theatre, 15 to 20 thousand people. The region had been saturated with our album. They didn't know we were Canadian, they just knew the songs. It was incredible."

Backed by manager Bruce Allen (who replaced Randy's brother Gary in 1972 when Gary was unable to relocate to Vancouver with the rest of Brave Belt), BTO logged over 300 dates in its first year of existence, which paid off. BTO I was later certified gold in 1974 by the Recording Industry Association of America.

=== Breakthrough and success 1973–1976 ===
BTO's second album, Bachman–Turner Overdrive II, was released in December 1973 and became an enormous hit in the US (peaking at number four in 1974) and their native Canada (peaking at number six on the RPM albums chart). Alternate titles considered for the album were Adrenaline Rush and Heavy Duty. It also yielded two of their best-known hit singles, "Let It Ride" and "Takin' Care of Business". While "Let It Ride" was BTO's first top-40 hit in the U.S. (peaking at number 23), "Takin' Care of Business" (Billboard #12, RPM #3) became one of the band's most enduring anthems. Randy had already written the core of "Takin' Care of Business" several years earlier as "White Collar Worker" while in the Guess Who, but that band had felt it was not their type of song. It reappeared in BTO's repertoire during the supporting gigs for the first album primarily, as Randy put it, "To give Fred Turner a chance to rest his voice." Randy had heard DJ Daryl Burlingham say the day before a gig, "We're takin' care of business on CFUN radio", and he decided to insert the lyrics "takin' care of business" into the chorus where "white collar worker" previously existed.

Tim Bachman left the band in early 1974 shortly after the release of Bachman–Turner Overdrive II. Randy Bachman, a Mormon convert, had very strong religious beliefs and established rules to be in BTO. Among them was a rule that drugs, alcohol, and premarital sex were prohibited on tour, and Tim is alleged to have broken all of these. He reportedly was given opportunities to change his lifestyle and did, at least temporarily. Said Randy in a 1974 Rolling Stone interview: "I know from experience what can ruin a good thing. Drugs made the guys in the Guess Who change. They got sloppy. They ruined themselves and their marriages." Some other accounts state that Tim left because he wanted to study record engineering and concert promotion. Tim himself lamented that during a months-long stretch on the road, he was only able to see his infant son a total of three days. In a 2002 interview, brother Robbie said, "He was basically asked to leave. He wasn't BTO caliber [and] it was difficult to rely on him. I guess the band was conflicting with his whole life."

BTO continued a very busy tour schedule and during the supporting tour for BTO II, Tim was replaced by Blair Thornton. Thornton had been in the Vancouver-based band Crosstown Bus, which released one album on MCA Records. In September 1974, the first BTO album with the modified line-up, Not Fragile (a play on the hit album Fragile by Yes), was released. It became a huge success, reaching number one on both the Canadian and US albums charts by late October. It included the number-one single "You Ain't Seen Nothing Yet" and album-oriented rock favourite "Roll on Down the Highway" (number 14 Billboard, number four RPM). Not Fragile remains BTO's top-selling noncompilation album, selling over eight million copies to date.

In 1975, the band engaged in highly successful tours of Europe and the US, wherein BTO was supported by Thin Lizzy, an emerging band also on the Mercury Records label. Said Randy, "Lizzy were just opening in England, but our label wanted to bust them in the rest of Europe and break them wide open in the States, so we toured with Phil and the boys for seven or eight months." With management pressure to capitalize on their growing success, BTO quickly recorded Four Wheel Drive in May 1975, which included the single "Hey You". Although reaching no higher than number 21 on the US charts, "Hey You" became BTO's second number-one single on the Canadian RPM chart. Meanwhile, the album charted in the top five in both the US and Canada.

Following a cross-Canada tour in the summer of 1975, which garnered caustic comments from the Canadian press as BTO had spent most of the last 18 months in the US, the band members were already developing songs for the next album. BTO went on to record Head On, releasing it in December 1975. This album produced the 1976 top-40 single "Take It Like a Man", which featured a guest appearance by Little Richard, who wailed away on his piano. Head On also featured the jazzy Randy Bachman composition "Lookin' Out for No. 1", which reached number 15 on the Adult Contemporary chart. While garnering some airplay on traditional rock stations, it also received fairly heavy rotation on soft rock stations, which normally did not play bands like BTO. Between the latter two albums, BTO released their only nonalbum single "Down to the Line". This song appeared on some of the later compilation CDs, as well as on reissues of the Head On album in CD format. Head On was the last BTO studio album to chart in the US top 40, peaking at number 23 in early 1976, while also climbing to number three in Canada.

The first BTO compilation album, Best of B.T.O. (So Far) released in July 1976, featured songs from each of the band's first five studio albums. A single, a re-release of "Gimme Your Money Please", was put out from this album, and it also charted well, keeping BTO on both the AM and FM airwaves. Although peaking at only number 19 on the charts, this compilation album became the best-selling BTO album to date, reaching double platinum status in the US.

=== Randy's departure and the new "BTO" 1977–1979 ===
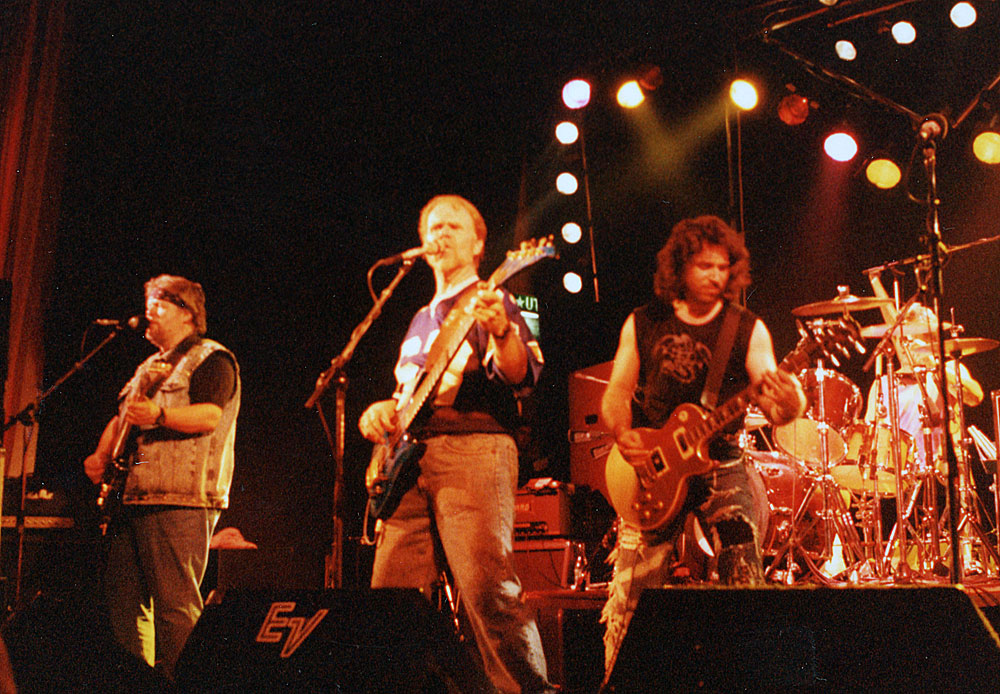
BTO in Örebro, Sweden, April 1991 L-R: Randy Bachman, Fred Turner, Blair Thornton, Robbie Bachman

Freeways, BTO's sixth studio album that was recorded in late 1976 and released in February 1977, signaled the end of BTO's most successful line-up. Facing some criticism for the "sameness" of the band's songs on the two follow-up albums to Not Fragile, Randy Bachman wanted to update BTO's sound, including adding horns and strings on some songs, but the rest of the band seemed to disagree. Said Fred Turner:

Since he (Randy) was funding the whole thing, everything went on his and Mercury's timetable. It finally came to a head for Freeways when Blair, Rob, and myself told Randy we were burnt out, didn't like the songs we were writing, didn't like the songs he was writing, and that we wanted to take some time to regroup – especially since all the other bands were taking a year or two between albums, not doing two a year like we were. Randy told us his songs were fine and forced the album. It ended that version of the band.

Years later, Randy seemed to agree with Turner, stating, "Looking at it now, we should have taken four, five, six months off ... live a little, and then come back together with new ideas. In retrospect, that's what a lot of great bands do. And we didn't." Freeways reached number 34 on the Canadian RPM chart, but only reached number 70 on the US pop albums chart. It contained no charting singles.

Randy Bachman left the group in May 1977, three months after the release of Freeways. His initial intention was to temporarily disband while he worked on a solo project, "But it was decided by management it wouldn't work." He conceded, "We also ran out of common interests." Robbie Bachman noted that the band had scheduled a meeting wherein Fred, Blair, and he were going to discuss getting back to their rock and roll roots following the relative failure of Freeways. Randy then shocked the rest by saying he was leaving, despite the fact that BTO was still under contract with Mercury to release two more albums over the next 18 months.

Randy was replaced by bassist Jim Clench, formerly of April Wine. Bassist Turner moved to rhythm guitar with Thornton becoming the primary lead guitarist. Clench and Turner shared lead vocal duties. Though this line-up included drummer Robbie Bachman, the band had to record and tour only as "BTO" because of an agreement with Randy, who wanted to retain the rights to his surname for his solo career. While Randy kept the rights to the full Bachman name, the remaining band members bought the rights to "BTO" and its trademarks, including the gear logo. The restructured BTO released Street Action in February 1978. The album was a commercial failure, missing the top 100 on the US albums chart and spawning no hit singles.

The band also released Rock n' Roll Nights in March 1979. It was the first BTO album to prominently feature outside songwriters, particularly Prism's Jim Vallance, who also co-produced the album. Vallance had taken over as main producer after Barry Mraz was fired by the band, and would later score huge success in the 1980s with Bryan Adams. Like its predecessor, though, Rock n' Roll Nights also sold poorly (an estimated 350,000 copies worldwide). The album did, however, produce a moderately successful single called "Heartaches". Written by Turner, it cracked the top 40 in Canada and reached number 60 on the US chart, making it the first BTO single in three years to chart in the US. BTO played this song on American Bandstand in February 1979 (with producer Vallance guesting on piano), along with another single from the same album called "Jamaica". Fred Turner and Jim Clench also appeared on Bryan Adams's debut album in 1980 as session musicians. (Adams had written one song, "Wastin' Time", for BTO's Rock n' Roll Nights album; Adams' own version of the song appeared a year later on his debut album.)

=== Disbandment, side projects, and reunions 1979–1991 ===
BTO completed a relatively successful 80-date tour for Street Action through late 1978, but only one show for Rock n' Roll Nights was played, at Victoria Memorial Arena in Victoria, BC, on April 7, 1979, and BTO officially disbanded in early 1980. After Randy recorded the solo album Survivor in 1978, he went on to form the short-lived Ironhorse in 1979. Ironhorse released two albums, Ironhorse and Everything Is Grey, before disbanding. Tom Sparks was the vocalist for the first Ironhorse album along with Randy, but was replaced by Frank Ludwig for the second album in 1980. Sparks reportedly did not like the constant touring and being away from home for such long times. A reformed version of Ironhorse, renamed as Union, released one album in 1981 entitled On Strike. Fred Turner was a member of Union along with Randy. The album sold poorly, as Randy was wrapped up in a bitter divorce and custody battle, thus unable to tour to support the release.

BTO reunited in 1983. Their line-up for their first studio LP in five years (released in 1984) consisted of Randy and Tim Bachman, Fred Turner, and former Guess Who drummer Garry Peterson, who were joined by Billy Chapman, their drum tech, on keyboards. Younger brother Robbie Bachman declined to participate after business and trademark disagreements with Randy and the others:

When Randy wanted to get back together again, I said, "Okay, let's have a publishing company with the band. Let's all write the tunes. We'll all share equally and there won't be any more animosity." He said no, so I got up and left. Blair wasn't asked to rejoin because Randy knew that Blair wouldn't take any crap like Timmy would. They went out and started to use the name BTO within a year and the same trademark that Randy sold to us! So Blair and I sued him and we won. They had to pay us royalties.

In Randy's 2000 autobiography, Takin' Care of Business, he counters that Robbie declined to participate in the reunion when Fred and he refused to share in the publishing royalties of the hit BTO songs Randy and Fred authored.

The new album, simply (and confusingly) titled Bachman–Turner Overdrive, was released in September 1984 on Charlie Fach's new Compleat label. "For the Weekend", a song from this album, was released as a single and had a companion music video. It dented the US charts at number 83, making it the first chart appearance by a BTO song in five years, and also the last by any formation of the band.

In July 1986, they released a live album, recorded at The Moon in Tallahassee, on August 1, 1985, called Live! Live! Live!, which featured two new tracks, "Bad News Travels Fast" and "Fragile Man". The latter was actually a studio recording with the audience sound added to it. A studio version of "Bad News Travels Fast" was released on the soundtrack for the movie Body Slam. They were the opening band for the new Sammy Hagar-fronted Van Halen on their 5150 tour in 1986. This plum opening slot was done by a trio line-up of Randy, Tim, and Garry Peterson (allegedly with some bass parts and Fred's voice provided via tapes), since Fred Turner had been unavailable when the group was first contacted by Van Halen's management. Chapman later stepped in as drummer for Peterson after the latter severely injured his leg while playing softball during the group's downtime on the road.

After the Van Halen tour ended, Randy split and Tim kept going briefly as BTO (see lineups below). The others reluctantly gave him permission to do so to get his way out of debt. Billy Chapman briefly drummed in Tim's lineup and later became the drummer for Randy Bachman's band and appeared on Randy's 1993 solo album Any Road.

In 1988, the 1974–77 Not Fragile line-up (Randy, Fred, Blair, Robbie) reformed once again, took to the road, and recorded an unknown number of songs together. The only song to make it out into the public by this version of the band was a cover of the song "Wooly Bully", which is only available on the American Boyfriends movie soundtrack. By late 1991, Randy Bachman had left the group again, with two explanations. The first, according to Randy Bachman, was that the band agreed to take a break, but at some point, the other members decided they wanted to continue doing concerts because the money was too good to pass up. Randy stated they asked him to tour with them, but he was working on his solo project and had to decline. The others then chose to go on as BTO without him. In the second explanation, the other members (particularly Robbie and Blair) have maintained that Randy quit.

=== Trial by Fire era (1991–2005) ===
Randy Bachman was replaced by Randy Murray after his second departure from the band in late 1991. (Murray had been in Tim Bachman's 1987–88 touring incarnations of BTO.) This reconstituted version of BTO (Murray with Robbie Bachman, Fred Turner, and Blair Thornton) proved to be its most enduring, as they toured together from 1991 until December 2004. This lineup recorded tracks included on Trial by Fire: Greatest and Latest.

The sibling rivalry between Robbie and Randy that had started with the 1984 reunion album continued during this era. Said Randy in a 1999 interview, "They said, 'We'll just call ourselves BTO. People will know you're not there.' The problem is when BTO pulls into town, the radio, the press people, call them Bachman-Turner Overdrive. It's like Coke and Coca-Cola, two names that go hand in hand. It kind of gets represented that I'm there and when they play the gig, I clearly am not there. [And] they've got another guy to take my place who unfortunately is named Randy. So, there's this inference that I'm there and I'm not there, which is a disservice to the fans." Replied brother Robbie, "Randy Murray doesn't fill anyone's shoes. He brings his own."

In 2003, the Canadian Music Hall of Fame voted to induct Bachman–Turner Overdrive into the museum. The band would have had to play as the Not Fragile line-up, however, meaning the inclusion of Randy Bachman to the band for that performance. The current version of BTO at the time declined the invitation unless they could be inducted as "BTO" without Randy Bachman playing on stage. The hall refused and the band was not inducted. (The "classic" line-up of Randy Bachman, Fred Turner, Blair Thornton, and Robbie Bachman was eventually inducted - by astronaut Chris Hadfield - in 2014.)

In an interview in 2004, Rob Bachman had stated that BTO was working on 9 or 10 new songs. Numerous sources reported that the band could not get a good label to release the project and wanted this album to be distributed and publicized well, unlike what happened to the Trial by Fire CD. A plan had been made to release a live DVD/CD from a show in 2003 in their hometown of Winnipeg, but thus far this has not happened.

=== Hiatus 2005–2009 ===
After the 2005 disbandment of the band, several of their albums were reissued. The first one to be made available again after the disbandment was Freeways in 2005, followed by Bachman–Turner Overdrive II in 2006 and Four Wheel Drive in 2008. Brave Belt I and Brave Belt II were re-released on a single CD March 17, 2009.

Although Rob and Blair remained very reticent about BTO since late 2004, Rob had been rumoured to state he no longer wished to play in the band and had hung up his drum sticks. On January 10, 2023, Robbie Bachman died at age 69.

On January 23, 2009, Tim Bachman played on stage at one of Randy Bachman's shows, the first time they had together since 2003. Randy Bachman, who already hosted the successful radio show Randy's Vinyl Tap, was slated to be the host of a new television show called Road to Guitar, which was set to air on the Discovery Channel. He was on tour with Burton Cummings during the summer of 2009, and played dates for the Randy Bachman Band in the United States and Canada for August and September.

Throughout his tenure in BTO and until 2017, Randy Murray played bar gigs and casual shows around the Vancouver area. He began working in Anglican Church communications in 2002. He is currently the communications officer of the Anglican Diocese of New Westminster and retired from music in 2017. He is the only Trial by Fire–era member of BTO, besides Fred Turner, to have played shows after the disbandment in January 2005. Like Rob, Murray has also stated he no longer wishes to be in BTO.

=== Bachman and Turner reunion 2009–2018 ===
Due to the intense interest in a Bachman-Turner reunion, Randy Bachman and Fred Turner announced their reteaming on December 8, 2009, in their hometown of Winnipeg.

Information on the 2010 Bachman and Turner tour and the new album was provided at their then-new website bachmanandturner.com. As Randy wrote on the site, the project started with his request to Turner that he sing lead on the song, "Rock 'n Roll Is the Only Way Out", but after hearing the track with Turner's vocals, Randy asked if his former bandmate could contribute more vocals and some original compositions and offered to put his solo project on hold in favour of a Bachman-Turner album. It morphed into a full-blown collaboration.

On September 12, 2009, the Winnipeg Free Press had already reported that Randy Bachman and C.F. Turner would reunite to play concert dates in Europe, Canada, and the US in 2010 backed by Randy's current band of Marc LaFrance, Mick Dalla-Vee, and Brent Howard, billed simply as Bachman and Turner. Some early confirmed tour dates announced were June 2010 at the Sweden Rock Festival and the High Voltage Festival in July 2010 at London UK; the story added that also interest arose from agents as far away as South America and Australia.

Bachman and Turner's tour and album plans resulted in a lawsuit by Rob Bachman and Blair Thornton regarding ownership of the band name and related trademarks. Rob Bachman and Blair Thornton claim that US and Canadian rights in the BTO name and trademark were transferred to Rob Bachman, Blair Thornton, and Fred Turner when Randy Bachman commenced a solo career in 1977. Randy Bachman is said to have registered the names "Bachman-Turner", "BTU", "Bachman-Turner United", and "Bachman-Turner Union" in both the United States and Canada. These names are said to cause confusion with the names "Bachman-Turner Overdrive" and "BTO", resulting in potential damages to Rob Bachman and Blair Thornton. There appeared to be general legal agreement that one could perform under one's own legal names such as "Bachman and Turner", so the newly reunited pair were billed as such for the 2010 tour and album. The band played the halftime show at the 2010 Grey Cup in Edmonton.

The rock duo's self-titled album, Bachman & Turner, was released September 7, 2010, in North America and on September 20, 2010, in Europe. In November 2010, they performed at the famous Roseland Ballroom in New York City as part of their North American tour. A double live album, Live at the Roseland Ballroom, NYC, was recorded at that show, which was also filmed and released on DVD and Blu-ray in 2012.

Capitalizing on the recent Bachman and Turner album and supporting shows, BTO released another compilation set in 2013, Bachman–Turner Overdrive: 40th Anniversary, with 26 songs on two CDs. Much of the collection had been released before, but the four previously unreleased songs included "Rough Ride" from the 1984 BTO reunion album sessions and "West Coast Turnaround" from the 1975 Head On sessions. The CD set also features one Brave Belt song ("Never Comin' Home") and eight songs on disc two are from the long out-of-print B.T.O. Live – Japan Tour album from 1976. Disc two also adds live versions of "Blue Collar" and "Give It Time", recorded at the same Japan concerts, but not released on the LP edition. On March 10, 2018, Randy Bachman announced that Fred Turner would be retiring from touring.

=== Resumption of Bachman-Turner Overdrive ===
In June 2023, Randy announced a resuming of Bachman–Turner Overdrive, in honor of their 50th anniversary, with a lineup consisting of the backup members of Bachman and Turner (who had also been backing him solo, as well): Mick Dalla-Vee (vocals, bass), Marc LaFrance (vocals, drums, percussion), and Brent Howard Knudsen (vocals, guitar), along with Randy's son Tal Bachman, who had previously achieved success as a solo artist, on vocals, guitar, and piano. The new lineup also toured in the fall of 2023, with more dates following in early 2024. Bruce Allen, Blair Thornton, and Fred Turner gave the new line-up their blessing, with Turner slated to appear with them on a new BTO album and possibly guesting on some tour dates, as well.

=== Band member deaths ===
On November 3, 2010, Jim Clench died at age 61 in a Montreal hospital after a battle with stage-four lung cancer.

Robbie Bachman died on January 12, 2023, aged 69. Less than four months later, on April 28, 2023, Tim Bachman died at age 71 after battling cancer.

== Impact and influence ==
BTO has been recognized in many music circles for carrying on the torch of guitar-heavy rock and roll at a time when soft rock was dominating the top-40 charts, and progressive and glam acts were getting an increasing share of FM radio play. As drummer Rob Bachman put it: "We were basically fans of all kinds of music, but really liked the old kind of rock-and-roll...like Elvis and the funky kinds of rock bands like the Stones. Luckily for us, Creedence had just called it quits, and we came out with three- and four-chord rock-and-roll with Fred Turner's gruff voice. So it was basically this working man's kind of rock-and-roll."

A reviewer assesses, however, that critics are divided over BTO's legacy:

Dave Marsh noted that the band peaked with Not Fragile, an album that "seemed to exhaust Bachman's imagination; everything before and since is simply sluggish." The band's entry in The Illustrated Encyclopedia of Rock acknowledges BTO's limitations, while properly assessing their assets: "However much it might be open to derision as formula cash-register boogie, BTO's rock is at least dexterously played and arranged, with dynamics reminiscent of mid-period Led Zeppelin." For a period during the mid-1970s, BTO enjoyed high sales, steady radio play, and sold-out arena shows.

Stated John Einarson, author of the biography Randy Bachman: Still Takin' Care of Business, "If the Guess Who made Canadian music North American, Bachman-Turner Overdrive made it international, earning gold and platinum records not only in the US and Canada, but [also] in Sweden, Australia, New Zealand, and South Africa, among others."

After accusing BTO of "shamelessly stealing riffs from the Rolling Stones, the Doobie Brothers, and anyone else who happened to be handy," Toronto Star critic Craig MacInnis acknowledged, "They knew how to put the hooks in all the right places, led by the urgent fretwork of Randy Bachman and the gravel vocal stylings of Turner, whose voice resembles a fully revved Harley-Davidson."

Stephen King derived his Richard Bachman pen name from Bachman–Turner Overdrive, stating he was listening to the band's song "You Ain't Seen Nothing Yet" at the time his publisher asked him to choose a pseudonym on the spot.

The band was featured in The Simpsons episode "Saddlesore Galactica", which has Randy and Fred voicing their own characters as BTO makes a reunion tour appearance in Springfield.

Randy Bachman and Fred Turner also appeared in the 2012 comedy movie The Campaign, making a cameo performing the song "Taking Care of Business".

Takin' Care of Business was also the title of a 1990 movie starring Jim Belushi as an escaped convict who wins tickets to see the Chicago Cubs in the World Series and finds the Filofax of businessman Charles Grodin. The song serves as the theme song to the movie.

The band is referenced in the 1994 novel Shoedog by George Pelecanos.

== Awards and recognition and other achievements ==
- 1974: Juno Award winner, Most Promising Group of the Year
- 1975: Juno Award winner, Group of the Year
- 1976: Juno Award winner, Group of the Year
- 1978: Juno Award nomination, Group of the Year
- 2008: Guitar Magazine, "Takin' Care of Business" rated at number 10 in top 100 most covered songs
- 2014: Canadian Music Hall of Fame, Inductee

== Personnel ==
=== Members ===
==== Current ====
- C. F. Turner – lead vocals, bass, guitar (1971–1979, 1983–1986, 1988–2005, 2009–2018, 2023-present; not touring 2023-present)
- Randy Bachman – lead vocals, guitar (1971–1977, 1983–1986, 1988–1991, 2023–present)
- Tal Bachman – lead vocals, guitar (2023–present)
- Brent Howard – guitar, backing vocals (2023–present)
- Lance LaPointe – bass (2025–present)
- Koko Bachman – drums (2025–present)

==== Former ====
- Chad Allan – lead vocals, keyboards (1971–1972; died 2023)
- Robbie Bachman – drums, percussion, backing vocals (1971–1979, 1988–2005; died 2023)
- Tim Bachman – lead vocals, guitar (1971–1974, 1983–1986; died 2023)
- Blair Thornton – guitar, backing vocals (1974–1979, 1988–2005)
- Jim Clench – lead vocals, bass (1977–1979; died 2010)
- Garry Peterson – drums, backing vocals (1983–1986)
- Billy Chapman – keyboards (1983–1986)
- Randy Murray – lead vocals, guitar (1991–2005)
- Mick Dalla-Vee – guitar, keyboards, backing vocals (2009–2018, 2023–2025), bass (2023–2025; substitute for C. F. Turner)
- Marc LeFrance – drums, backing vocals (2009–2018, 2023–2025)

=== Line-ups ===
1971-1972 (as Brave Belt)	Randy Bachman – lead vocals, guitar; C. Fred Turner – lead vocals, bass; Chad Allan – lead vocals, keyboards; Tim Bachman – guitar, backing vocals; Robbie Bachman – drums, percussion
1973–1974	Randy Bachman – lead vocals, guitar; C. Fred Turner – lead vocals, bass; Tim Bachman – guitar, backing vocals; Robbie Bachman – drums, percussion
1974–1977	Randy Bachman – lead vocals, guitar; C. Fred Turner – lead vocals, bass; Blair Thornton – guitar, backing vocals; Robbie Bachman – drums, percussion, backing vocals
1977–1979 (as B.T.O.)	C. Fred Turner – lead vocals, guitar; Jim Clench – bass, lead vocals; Blair Thornton – guitar, backing vocals; Robbie Bachman – drums, percussion, backing vocals
1979–1983	Disbanded
1983–1986	Randy Bachman – lead vocals, guitar; C. Fred Turner – lead vocals, bass; Tim Bachman – guitar, backing vocals; Garry Peterson – drums, backing vocals; Billy Chapman – keyboards
1987–1988 (as Tim's B.T.O)	Tim Bachman – guitar, lead vocals; Randy Murray – guitar, lead vocals; David Reimer – bass, backing vocals; Billy Chapman – drums (January 1987 – April 1987); John Cody – drums (May 1987 – January 1988); Rick Fedyk – drums (January 1988 – April 1988)
1988 (as Tim's B.T.O)	Tim Bachman – guitar, vocals; Mike Kelly – guitar, vocals; Jim Robinson – bass; Rick Fedyk – drums (May 1988); Vince Ditrich – drums (June–September 1988)
1988–1991	Randy Bachman – lead vocals, guitar; C. Fred Turner – lead vocals, bass; Blair Thornton – guitar, backing vocals; Robbie Bachman – drums, percussion, backing vocals
1991–2005 (as B.T.O)	Randy Murray – guitar, lead vocals; C. Fred Turner – lead vocals, bass; Blair Thornton – guitar, backing vocals; Robbie Bachman – drums, percussion, backing vocals
2005–2009	Disbanded
2009–2018 (as Bachman & Turner)	Randy Bachman – lead vocals, guitar; C. Fred Turner – lead vocals, bass; Mick Dalla-Vee – guitar, keyboards, backing vocals; Brent Howard – guitar, backing vocals; Marc LaFrance – drums, backing vocals
2018–2023	Disbanded
2023–March 2025	Randy Bachman – lead vocals, guitar; C. Fred Turner – lead vocals, bass (on select dates); Tal Bachman – lead vocals, guitar; Mick Dalla-Vee – bass, guitar, keyboards, backing vocals; Brent Howard – guitar, backing vocals; Marc LaFrance – drums, backing vocals
April 2025–present	Randy Bachman – lead vocals, guitar; Tal Bachman - lead vocals, guitar; Brent Howard – guitar, backing vocals; Lance LaPointe – bass; Koko Bachman – drums

== Discography ==
- Bachman–Turner Overdrive (1973)
- Bachman–Turner Overdrive II (1973)
- Not Fragile (1974)
- Four Wheel Drive (1975)
- Head On (1975)
- Freeways (1977)
- Street Action (1978)
- Rock n' Roll Nights (1979)
- Bachman–Turner Overdrive (1984)
- Trial by Fire: Greatest & Latest (1996)

== Filmography ==
Year	Title
1975	1975 Road Special
1988	88 Reunion
1995	BTO: The Movie

== See also ==
- Canadian rock
- Music of Canada
- List of Canadian musicians
- List of bands from Canada
- Sibling musical groups
