= Let It Ride (Bachman–Turner Overdrive song) =

Single by Bachman–Turner Overdrive

from the album Bachman–Turner Overdrive II
- B-side: "Tramp"
- Released: April 12, 1974
- Recorded: 1973
- Genre: Rock
- Length: 4:27 (LP); 3:33 (single)
- Label: Mercury
- Songwriters: Randy Bachman, Fred Turner
- Producer: Randy Bachman

Bachman–Turner Overdrive singles chronology
"Blue Collar" (1973)	"Let It Ride" (1974)	"Takin' Care of Business" (1974)

"Let It Ride" is a 1974 single by Bachman-Turner Overdrive, written by Randy Bachman and Fred Turner, with the latter providing lead vocals. It was first recorded for the 1973 album Bachman–Turner Overdrive II. The single peaked at No. 23 on the U.S. Billboard Hot 100 on April 27, 1974 (making it BTO's first Top 40 song in the US), and spent two weeks at No. 14 on the Cash Box Top 100. In Canada, the song reached No. 3.

== Background ==
The tune was inspired by a traffic incident. While on tour in 1973 supporting The Doobie Brothers, the band was on a highway in the Band’s AMC station wagon with Manitoba license plates and got boxed in by a couple of trucks. When the station wagon and the trucks reached a rest area, the musicians confronted the truck drivers, who responded by saying the band members should settle down and just let it ride.

== Reception ==
Cash Box called it a "hard rocking outing" saying that "the vocals, both up front and background harmonies, hit the mark and blend perfectly with the music." Record World said that "forceful, driving instrumental work comes to the forefront" and "gritty vocalizing clinches it."

== Cover versions ==
- The song was covered by Canadian rock band Big Sugar on their 1998 album, Heated.
- It was also covered by Canadian country music group Farmer's Daughter on their 1998 album This Is the Life. Their version was released as a single in 1999 and peaked at No. 30 on the RPM Country Tracks chart in Canada.
- In 2015, Canadian heavy metal band Kobra and the Lotus covered the song on their first EP Words of the Prophets.
- In 2000, The Guess Who included "Let it Ride" in their setlist for the Runnin' Back Through Canada Tour, along with other Bachman-Turner Overdrive songs. Randy Bachman sang lead.

== In other media ==
"Let It Ride" has appeared in a number of films and television series. It has been in films such as:

- Anchorman 2: The Legend Continues
- Lovelace
- The Hooker with a Heart of Gold
- Halloween
- Gutterballs
- Invincible
- Radio

As well as TV shows like:

- My Name Is Earl
- The Wonder Years, Supernatural
- Ed, "Ray Donovan" and "Mayans MC"

== Track listing ==
1973 single
No.	Title	Length
1.	"Let It Ride"	3:33
2.	"Tramp"	4:03
Total length:		7:36

== Charts ==
=== Weekly ===
Chart (1974)	Peak position
Canada RPM	3
U.S. Billboard Hot 100	23
U.S. Cash Box Top 100	14

=== Year-end ===
Chart (1974)	Rank
Canada	57
U.S. (Joel Whitburn's Pop Annual)	170
