= Tim Bachman =

Canadian guitarist and vocalist (1951–2023)

- Born: Timothy Gregg Bachman; August 1, 1951; Winnipeg, Manitoba, Canada
- Died: April 28, 2023 (aged 71)
- Genres: Rock
- Occupation: Musician
- Instruments: Guitar, vocals
- Formerly of: Brave Belt, Bachman-Turner Overdrive

Timothy Gregg Bachman (August 1, 1951 – April 28, 2023) was a Canadian guitarist and vocalist best known for his work with rock bands Brave Belt and Bachman–Turner Overdrive (BTO). Bachman was one of the four founding members of BTO together with his brothers Randy (guitar/vocals) and Robbie (drums), and Fred Turner (bass/vocals). BTO has sold nearly 30 million albums worldwide.

== Career ==
Tim Bachman played guitar in a few Winnipeg-area bands, some with his younger brother Robbie on drums. He then briefly quit music, feeling that the Winnipeg scene had become stagnant. He got a job and began attending college. He returned to music in 1972, when his older brother Randy was looking to add a second guitar to the Brave Belt lineup. This occurred after the departure of Chad Allan, which left Brave Belt with only three members.

Bachman left BTO in 1974, shortly after the release of Bachman–Turner Overdrive II. Tim said it was to spend more time with his family and to work on concert promotion but brothers Rob and Randy reported that he was fired for breaking Randy's rules of the road which prohibited alcohol and drugs.

Tim Bachman rejoined BTO (whose other members, at that time, were Randy Bachman, Fred Turner, and Garry Peterson), for a 1984 reunion album and supporting tours, including a high-profile world tour opening for Van Halen.

== Personal life ==
In 2008, he suffered a heart attack and subsequently underwent quadruple bypass surgery. Bachman died on April 28, 2023, at the age of 71, after suffering from cancer. His brother Robbie had died less than four months earlier.

== Sexual offense allegations ==
On June 14, 2010, Bachman was charged by the Abbotsford Police Department with sexual interference of a person under 14, touching a young person for a sexual purpose, and sexual assault. Police recommended a charge of sexual exploitation, but Crown attorney opted to split the case into three separate counts. After an extensive investigation police charged Bachman for incidents that allegedly began in Abbotsford in 2000 when the complainant was 11 years old and continued for three years.

Stacy Bohun alleged that Bachman would grope her when she was a foster child living in his home in the Fraser Valley. Bachman was found not guilty on these counts, as Justice Neill Brown ruled that the testimony of Bohun was too unreliable to support a criminal conviction.

On May 26, 2014, Bachman was arrested again by Abbotsford police on new sex charges relating to incidents from the 1990s involving a different under-aged victim. He faced charges of sexual assault, sexual interference, and invitation to sexual touching. He was released pending trial on conditions which included avoiding contact with anyone under the age of 16, and avoiding any public park, schoolground, daycare, swimming pool or any other facility where minors under 16 might be present. Those charges were stayed on November 19, 2015. A representative of the Criminal Justice Branch could not provide any details regarding why the charges were stayed, but did state that this decision was reached while the prosecutor was preparing for the preliminary inquiry.

== Discography ==
=== With Bachman–Turner Overdrive ===
Title	Details
Bachman–Turner Overdrive (1973)	Released: May 17, 1973; Label: Mercury
Bachman–Turner Overdrive II	Released: December 1973; Label: Mercury
Bachman–Turner Overdrive (1984)	Released: September 1984; Label: Compleat
Live! Live! Live! (1986)	Released: July 1986; Label: Curb
Best of Bachman–Turner Overdrive Live (1994)	Released: January 24, 1994; Label: Curb
