= Anthology (The Guess Who album) =

Compilation album by The Guess Who
- Released: 2003, 2010 (re-issue)
- Recorded: 1964, 1966–1975
- Genre: Rock
- Length: 148:17
- Labels: RCA Victor, BMG
- Producer: Jack Richardson

The Guess Who chronology
Power in the Music (1975)	Anthology (2003)

Professional ratings
Review scores
Source	Rating
Allmusic	4/5 stars

Anthology is a 2003 compilation album by the Canadian rock band The Guess Who. Anthology is a career-spanning collection of songs recorded between 1964 and 1975. The songs are arranged in chronological order.

This compilation was re-released as The Essential Guess Who as a part of The Essential series in 2010.

CD 1 contains a hidden track of an RCA radio spot for Wheatfield Soul. CD 2 contains two hidden tracks, promos for Road Food and Flavours.

== Reception ==
Steve Leggett of AllMusic: "This two-disc, 39-track set collects all of those singles, from the group’s fiery 1964 cover of “Shakin’ All Over” (sung by Chad Allan—Cummings hadn't yet joined the band) through 1974's willfully nostalgic “Clap for the Wolfman,” which was to be the Guess Who's last big radio hit—they disbanded a year later in 1975. In between they released classics like the gorgeous ballad “These Eyes,” the Zombies-like “Undun,” the fuzz guitar-laced “No Time,” a subtly veiled critique of American capitalism, “American Woman,” the marvelous pop songs “Hand Me Down World” and “Bus Rider,” the stomping “Heartbroken Bopper,” and the driving, slightly sarcastic “Star Baby,” and each of these is collected here, among other interesting tracks."

== Track listing ==
Disc 1
No.	Title	Writer(s)	Album	Length
1.	"Shakin' All Over"	Johnny Kidd	Shakin' All Over	2:46
2.	"It's My Pride"	Randy Bachman	1967 non-album B-side	2:48
3.	"When Friends Fall Out"	Bachman/Burton Cummings	1968 non-album single	3:14
4.	"These Eyes"	Bachman/Cummings	Wheatfield Soul	3:43
5.	"A Wednesday in Your Garden""	Bachman	Wheatfield Soul	3:20
6.	"Laughing"	Bachman/Cummings	Canned Wheat	2:44
7.	"6 A.M. or Nearer"	Bachman	Canned Wheat	5:00
8.	"Undun"	Bachman	Canned Wheat	3:25
9.	"No Time"	Bachman/Cummings	American Woman	3:45
10.	"No Sugar Tonight/New Mother Nature"	Bachman/Cummings	American Woman	4:52
11.	"American Woman"	Bachman/Cummings/Jim Kale/Garry Peterson	American Woman	5:09
12.	"The Answer"	Bachman/Cummings	The Way They Were (rec. 1970)	4:05
13.	"Hand Me Down World"	Kurt Winter	Share the Land	3:26
14.	"Bus Rider"	Winter	Share the Land	2:57
15.	"Share the Land"	Cummings	Share the Land	3:52
16.	"Hang On to Your Life (single version)"	Cummings/Winter	Share the Land	3:22
17.	"Do You Miss Me Darlin'"	Cummings/Winter	Share the Land	3:56
18.	"Albert Flasher"	Cummings	1971 non-album single	2:27
19.	"Broken"	Cummings/Winter	1971 non-album single B-side	3:08
20.	"Pain Train"	Cummings/Winter	So Long, Bannatyne	3:44
21.	"Sour Suite"	Cummings	So Long, Bannatyne	5:18

Disc 2
No.	Title	Writer(s)	Album	Length
1.	"Rain Dance"	Cummings/Winter	So Long, Bannatyne	2:46
2.	"Heartbroken Bopper"	Cummings/Winter	Rockin'	3:12
3.	"Smoke Big Factory"	Cummings/Winter/Kale	Rockin'	3:57
4.	"Guns, Guns, Guns"	Cummings	Rockin'	4:59
5.	"Runnin' Back to Saskatoon (single version)"	Cummings/Winter	Live at the Paramount	3:36
6.	"Follow Your Daughter Home"	Cummings/McDougall/Peterson/Wallace/Winter	Artificial Paradise	3:41
7.	"Samantha's Living Room"	Donnie McDougall	Artificial Paradise	3:26
8.	"Orly"	Cummings	Artificial Paradise	2:54
9.	"Those Show Biz Shoes"	Cummings	Artificial Paradise	6:49
10.	"Glamour Boy (single version)"	Cummings/Winter	#10	3:49
11.	"Cardboard Empire"	Bill Wallace, Winter	#10	3:25
12.	"Star Baby"	Cummings	Road Food	2:42
13.	"Sona Sona"	Cummings	Track Record (rec. 1974)	3:25
14.	"Clap for the Wolfman"	Cummings, Wallace, Winter	Road Food	4:15
15.	"Hoe Down Time"	Cummings/Domenic Troiano	Flavours	3:52
16.	"Dancin' Fool"	Cummings/Troiano	Flavours	3:34
17.	"Dreams"	Cummings/Troiano	Power in the Music	5:03
18.	"When the Band Was Singin' (Shakin' All Over)"	Cummings/Troiano	Power in the Music	5:49

=== Production ===
- Mastered by Vic Anesini at Sony Music Studios, NYC
- Compilation Producer – Al Quaglieri
