= The Best of The Guess Who Volume II =

1973 compilation album by The Guess Who

Compilation album by The Guess Who
- Released: November 1973
- Recorded: 1970–1973
- Genre: Rock
- Length: 42:23
- Label: RCA Victor
- Producer: Jack Richardson

The Guess Who chronology
#10 (1973)	The Best of The Guess Who Volume II (1973)	Road Food (1974)

Professional ratings
Review scores
Source	Rating
AllMusic	3/5 stars

The Best of The Guess Who Volume II is the fifth compilation album by the Canadian group The Guess Who. It was originally released by RCA Records in 1973, and contains recordings made between 1970 and 1973.

== Release history ==
In addition to the usual two-channel stereo version the album was also released by RCA in a four-channel quadraphonic version on LP record and 8-track tape in 1974. The quad LP release used the Quadradisc system. The album peaked at number 186 on the Billboard 200 in January 1974.

In 1979, Pickwick Records reissued the album under license from RCA. This budget version omits the songs "Sour Suite" and "Guns, Guns, Guns". (When RCA in Canada reissued this album on cassette in 1985, they used the Pickwick track listing.)

RCA first issued the album on compact disc in 1992. In 2019, the album was reissued in the UK by Dutton Vocalion on the Super Audio CD format. The disc also contains the 1972 album Rockin'. The Dutton Vocalion release contains the complete stereo and quad versions of both albums.

== Track listing ==
Side one
No.	Title	Writer(s)	Length
1.	"Broken"	Burton Cummings; Kurt Winter	3:05
2.	"Albert Flasher"	Cummings	2:24
3.	"Rain Dance"	Cummings; Winter	2:44
4.	"Sour Suite"	Cummings	4:06
5.	"Life in the Bloodstream"	Cummings	3:10
6.	"Guns, Guns, Guns"	Cummings	4:59

Side two
No.	Title	Writer(s)	Length
7.	"Heartbroken Bopper"	Cummings; Winter	4:10
8.	"Runnin' Back to Saskatoon"	Cummings; Winter	6:16
9.	"Follow Your Daughter Home"	Cummings; Donnie McDougall; Garry Peterson; Bill Wallace; Winter	3:39
10.	"Orly"	Cummings	2:54
11.	"Glamour Boy"	Cummings	4:52

Tracks 1 & 2: non-album single (1971)

Tracks 3, 4 & 5: from the album So Long, Bannatyne (1971)

Tracks 6 & 7: from the album Rockin' (1972)

Track 8: from the album Live at the Paramount (1972)

Tracks 9 & 10: from the album Artificial Paradise (1973)

Track 11: from the album #10 (1973)

== 1979 Pickwick/Camden LP and 1985 RCA cassette track listing ==
Side one
No.	Title	Writer(s)	Length
1.	"Broken"	Burton Cummings; Kurt Winter	3:05
2.	"Albert Flasher"	Cummings	2:24
3.	"Rain Dance"	Cummings; Winter	3:25
4.	"Glamour Boy"	Cummings	4:52
5.	"Life in the Bloodstream"	Cummings	3:10

Side two
No.	Title	Writer(s)	Length
6.	"Runnin' Back to Saskatoon"	Cummings; Winter	6:24
7.	"Follow Your Daughter Home"	Cummings; Donnie McDougall; Garry Peterson; Bill Wallace; Winter	3:39
8.	"Orly"	Cummings	2:54
9.	"Heartbroken Bopper"	Cummings; Winter	3:26

== Personnel ==
The Guess Who

on tracks 1−7

- Burton Cummings − lead vocals, keyboards
- Kurt Winter − lead guitar
- Greg Leskiw − rhythm guitar, backing vocals
- Jim Kale − bass, backing vocals
- Garry Peterson − drums, backing vocals

on track 8

- Burton Cummings – lead vocals, keyboards
- Kurt Winter – lead guitar
- Donnie McDougall − rhythm guitar, backing vocals
- Jim Kale − bass, backing vocals
- Garry Peterson – drums

on tracks 9−11

- Burton Cummings – lead vocals, keyboards
- Kurt Winter – lead guitar
- Donnie McDougall − rhythm guitar, backing vocals
- Bill Wallace – bass, backing vocals
- Garry Peterson – drums

Additional personnel

- Jack Richardson − producer
- Brian Christian − engineer and Quadraphonic remix

== Charts ==
Chart (1973)	Peak position
Canada Top Albums/CDs (RPM)	8
US Billboard 200	186

== Certifications ==
Region	Certification	Certified units/sales
Canada (Music Canada)	Gold	50,000^{^}
^{^} Shipments figures based on certification alone.
