= The Best of The Guess Who =

Compilation album by The Guess Who
- Released: April 1971
- Recorded: 1968–1970
- Genre: Rock
- Length: 42:29
- Label: RCA Victor
- Producer: Jack Richardson

The Guess Who chronology
Share the Land (1970)	The Best of The Guess Who (1971)	So Long, Bannatyne (1971)

Professional ratings
Review scores
Source	Rating
Allmusic	4/5 stars
Christgau's Record Guide	B+

The Best of The Guess Who is the fourth compilation album by the Canadian group The Guess Who. It was originally released by RCA Records in April 1971 and contains recordings made between 1968 and 1970. The album reached number 12 on the Billboard top LPs chart in the United States.

A follow-up, The Best of The Guess Who Volume II, was released in 1973.

== Release history ==
The first half of the album contains tracks from 1968 to 1970, while the second half of the album contains tracks from the 1970 album "Share the Land". Some of the songs on this album are single edits. For example, the single version of "American Woman" is missing the acoustic introduction. The single version of "Undun", is used as well without the piano intro.

Randy Bachman appears as lead guitar for the first half of the album, while Kurt Winter and Greg Leskiw appear on guitar on the second half of the album.

In addition to the usual 2-channel stereo version, the album was also released by RCA in a 4-channel quadraphonic version on 8-track tape and reel-to-reel.

RCA first reissued the album on compact disc in 1988; the single version of "American Woman" was replaced with the album version. Another reissue by RCA/Legacy Recordings in 2006 restored the single recording and added three bonus tracks.

In 2014, the album was released in the Super Audio CD format by Audio Fidelity. This version contains the complete stereo and quadraphonic versions on one disc. The stereo version includes the full album version of "American Woman", but the quad version has the edited recording. Both the stereo and quad versions of "Hang On to Your Life" include the Psalm 22 ending.

== Reception ==
Gary Hill of AllMusic says "It is sometimes hard to believe that the same group that brought the world the jazzy 'Undun' and the CS&N-ish hippie anthem 'Share the Land' is also responsible for the rocking 'No Time.' This 11-track collection paints a very entertaining picture of a multi-talented band and is a perfect introduction for the casual fan."

== Track listing ==
Side one
No.	Title	Writer(s)	Length
1.	"These Eyes"	Burton Cummings; Randy Bachman	3:43
2.	"Laughing"	Cummings; Bachman	2:44
3.	"Undun"	Bachman	3:25
4.	"No Time"	Cummings; Bachman	3:45
5.	"American Woman"	Cummings; Bachman; Jim Kale; Garry Peterson	3:50
6.	"No Sugar Tonight/New Mother Nature"	Cummings; Bachman	4:52

Side two
No.	Title	Writer(s)	Length
7.	"Hand Me Down World"	Kurt Winter	3:26
8.	"Bus Rider"	Winter	2:56
9.	"Share the Land"	Cummings	3:53
10.	"Do You Miss Me Darlin'?"	Cummings; Winter	3:55
11.	"Hang On to Your Life"	Cummings; Winter	4:08

2006 reissue bonus tracks
No.	Title	Writer(s)	Length
12.	"Albert Flasher"	Cummings	2:27
13.	"Broken"	Cummings; Winter	3:08
14.	"Rain Dance"	Cummings; Winter	2:44

- The original 1990 CD issue contains a misprint of the running time for "No Sugar Tonight/New Mother Nature" as 7:51.

== Personnel ==
The Guess Who

on tracks 1−6

- Burton Cummings – lead vocals, rhythm guitar, keyboards, flute, harmonica
- Randy Bachman – lead and rhythm guitar, backing vocals
- Jim Kale – bass, backing vocals
- Garry Peterson – drums, backing vocals

on tracks 7−11 + bonus tracks

- Burton Cummings − lead vocals, keyboards
- Kurt Winter − lead guitar, backing vocals
- Greg Leskiw − rhythm guitar, backing vocals
- Jim Kale − bass, backing vocals
- Garry Peterson − drums, backing vocals

Additional personnel

- Arranger: The Guess Who (Tracks 4−11)
- Engineer: David Greene and Elliot Scheiner (Tracks 1−3), Randy Kling (Tracks 4−6), Brian Christian (Tracks 4−5)
- Producer: Jack Richardson

== Charts ==
Chart (1971)	Peak position
Canada Top Albums/CDs (RPM)	9
US Billboard 200	12

== Certifications ==
Region	Certification	Certified units/sales
Canada (Music Canada)	Platinum	100,000^{^}
United States (RIAA)	Gold	500,000^{^}
^{^} Shipments figures based on certification alone.
