= Shakin' All Over (album) =

Studio album by Chad Allan & The Expressions
- Released: April 1965
- Recorded: 1963–1964
- Studio: CJAY-TV Studio B (Winnipeg, Manitoba) Kay Bank (Minneapolis, Minnesota)
- Genre: Garage rock
- Length: 29:17
- Label: Quality, Scepter
- Producer: Bob Burns

Chad Allan & The Expressions chronology
Shakin' All Over (1965)	Hey Ho (What You Do to Me!) (1965)

Singles from Shakin' All Over
- 1. "Shy Guy" Released: 1963; 2. "Stop Teasing Me" Released: 1964; 3. "Shakin' All Over" Released: 1965; 4. "Tossin' and Turnin'" Released: 1965

Professional ratings
Review scores
Source	Rating
Allmusic	2.5/5 stars

Shakin' All Over is the debut studio album by the Canadian rock band The Guess Who, although at the time they were known as "Chad Allan & the Expressions". It is regarded as a garage rock album and features their hit version of Johnny Kidd & the Pirates hit song "Shakin' All Over".

The 2001 release of Shakin' All Over is actually a collection of tracks from the band's first three albums.

== Canadian release on Quality ==
All songs written and composed by Chad Allan except where noted.

No.	Title	Writer(s)	Length
1.	"Shakin' All Over"	Johnny Kidd	2:46
2.	"Tossin' and Turnin'"	Ritchie Adams, Malou Rene	2:34
3.	"Stop Teasing Me"	Randy Bachman	2:38
4.	"Like I Love You"		2:02
5.	"Till We Kissed (Where Have You Been)"	Barry Mann, Cynthia Weil	2:39
6.	"Shy Guy"		2:30
7.	"Shot of Rhythm 'N Blues"	Curtis Thompson	2:09
8.	"I Want You to Love Me"	Jim Kale	2:23
9.	"I'd Rather Be Alone"		2:19
10.	"I've Been Away"	Bachman	2:11
11.	"Tuff E Nuff"	Johnny Otis	2:36
12.	"Turn Around and Walk Away"		2:30

== US release on Scepter ==
No.	Title	Writer	Length
1.	"Shakin' All Over"	Johnny Kidd	2:46
2.	"Hey Ho, What You Do to Me"	Nickolas Ashford, Valerie Simpson	2:10
3.	"Tossin' and Turnin'"	Ritchie Adams, Malou Rene	2:34
4.	"I Should Have Realized"	Chad Allan, Linda Timmins	2:03
5.	"Hurting Each Other"	Gary Geld, Peter Udell	2:17
6.	"I'll Keep Coming Back"	Gerry Robinson, Mitch Murray, Eddie Silvers, Neil Levenson	1:55
7.	"Could This Be Love"	Helen Miller, Rose Marie McCoy	2:10
8.	"Stop Teasing Me"	Randy Bachman	2:38
9.	"Till We Kissed (Where Have You Been)"	Barry Mann, Cynthia Weil	2:39
10.	"Theme from a Music Box"	Randy Bachman	2:10
11.	"Don't Be Scared"	Bruce Johnston	2:10
12.	"Goodnight, Goodnight"	Randy Bachman	2:25

== 2001 Shakin' All Over collection ==
No.	Title	Writer	Length
1.	"Shakin' All Over"	Johnny Kidd	2:42
2.	"Tuff E Nuff"	Johnny Otis	2:35
3.	"I'd Rather Be Alone"		2:14
4.	"All Right"	M. Hayes, J. Purcell, C. McClellan	2:24
5.	"Baby Feelin'"	Johnny Kidd	2:35
6.	"You Know He Did"	Lee Ransford, Al Ransom	2:06
7.	"Believe Me"	Randy Bachman	2:55
8.	"Clock on the Wall"	Randy Bachman	3:03
9.	"It's My Pride"	Randy Bachman	2:48
10.	"If You Don't Want Me"	Burton Cummings	3:03
11.	"Baby's Birthday"		1:59
12.	"Made in England"	Ian Anderson, Randy Bachman	3:03
13.	"Seven Long Years"	Burton Cummings	2:48
14.	"Gonna Search"	Randy Bachman	2:34
15.	"Stop Teasing Me"	Randy Bachman	2:30
16.	"Hey Ho, What You Do to Me"	Nickolas Ashford, Valerie Simpson	2:23
17.	"One Day"	Randy Bachman	2:10
18.	"I Should Have Realized"		2:12
19.	"Use Your Imagination"	Cole Porter, Artie Wayne	2:12
20.	"Don't Act So Bad"	Jim Kale	3:15
21.	"As"	Randy Bachman	2:27
22.	"Just a Matter of Time"		2:12
23.	"Flying on the Ground is Wrong"	Neil Young	2:34
24.	"Goodnight, Goodnight"	Randy Bachman	2:30

== Personnel ==
- Chad Allan – lead vocals, rhythm guitar
- Randy Bachman – lead guitar, backing vocals
- Jim Kale – bass, backing vocals
- Garry Peterson – drums, saxophone
- Bob Ashley – piano, organ

== Charts ==
Singles

Year	Single	Chart	Position
1965	"Shakin' All Over"	Canada	1
1965	"Shakin' All Over"	Australia	27
1965	"Shakin' All Over"	Billboard Hot 100	22
1965	"Tossin' and Turnin'"	Canada	3
