= Brother (Canadian band) =

Canadian rock band

- Origin: Winnipeg, Manitoba, Canada
- Genre: Rock music
- Years active: 1969-1971
- Members: Kurt Winter; Bill Wallace; Vance Schmidt

Brother was a short-lived rock trio from Winnipeg, Manitoba, best known for the fact that all three members later joined The Guess Who. They are only known to have recorded three songs.

== History ==
Brother was formed in 1969 by guitarist/singer Kurt Winter, bassist/singer Bill Wallace, and drummer/singer Vance Schmidt (later known as Vance Masters). In the summer of 1970, the band members organized and headlined the Niverville Pop Festival, Manitoba's first rock festival.

Through the Winnipeg rock scene, the members of Brother were longtime acquaintances of The Guess Who, and the two bands often attended each other's gigs. Guitarist Randy Bachman left The Guess Who in mid-1970, and that band's leader Burton Cummings recruited Winter as Bachman's replacement. Winter took some unrecorded Brother songs with him, including "Hand Me Down World" and "Bus Rider", which appeared on the 1970 Guess Who album Share the Land. Some later Guess Who songs including "Rain Dance" and "Runnin' Back to Saskatoon" were also based on Brother songs.

Brother ceased to exist after Winter's departure, with Wallace and Schmidt joining other Manitoba bands. The three members of Brother briefly reunited in 1971 to record the singles "Second Time Around the Woodpile" and "Sending Money"; the recording was financed by Winter but failed to attract notice. The Guess Who's bassist Jim Kale departed that band in 1972 and was replaced by Wallace, the second member of Brother to move to The Guess Who. Winter and Wallace were members of The Guess Who simultaneously for about two years; Winter left that band in 1974, and Wallace remained until the band split in 1975.

After The Guess Who broke up, various former members of that band attempted reunion tours with floating line-ups. Winter briefly joined a line-up led by Jim Kale in 1977-78, including recording on the 1978 album Guess Who's Back. Schmidt, now known as Vance Masters, joined Burton Cummings's solo band in 1977 and then joined Winter in the Kale-led Guess Who from 1977-1979, playing live and contributing drums to the 1978 album Guess Who's Back and 1979's All This For A Song. Wallace contributed to a Guess Who reunion show in 1979 and a lengthy nostalgia tour from 2000 to 2003.

Brother reformed one more time for a charity performance in 1994. Winter retired from music in 1978, and died of kidney failure on December 14, 1997, at the age of 51. Masters (Schmidt) remained active in the Manitoba music scene, playing with some of Winnipeg's longest running groups through the 1980s, including The Trigger Brothers, Yogi and Friends, and Twister. In 1992, he began a 10-year stint with the country-rock band, Guns 4 Hire. He retired in 2016, due to the symptoms of Multiple Sclerosis, and died at the age of 77 on June 22, 2023, following a severe COVID-19 infection.
