= Live at the Paramount (The Guess Who album) =

Live album by The Guess Who
- Released: August 1972
- Recorded: May 22, 1972
- Venues: Paramount Theater, Seattle, Washington
- Genre: Rock
- Length: 48:32 (LP version)
- Label: RCA Victor
- Producer: Jack Richardson (for Nimbus Nine)

The Guess Who chronology
Rockin' (1972)	Live at the Paramount (1972)	Artificial Paradise (1973)

Professional ratings
Review scores
Source	Rating
Allmusic -	4/5 stars
Rolling Stone -	(favorable)

Live at the Paramount is a live album released by Canadian rock group The Guess Who in 1972. It was recorded on May 22, 1972 at the Paramount Theatre in Seattle, Washington. Live at the Paramount was the first Guess Who album to feature Donnie McDougall on rhythm guitar and the last to feature original bassist Jim Kale. It also includes performances of three exclusive songs not included on any of their studio albums: "Glace Bay Blues", "Runnin' Back to Saskatoon", and "Truckin' Off Across the Sky".

The album reached number 39 on the Billboard 200 album chart in the United States. This was the group's only live album until the 'classic lineup' reunion in 1983 (resulting in the album Together Again, released the following year).

RCA reissued the original seven track album on compact disc in 1990. The 2000 RCA/Buddha CD reissue was remixed and added six bonus tracks from the same concert which did not fit on the original LP. Four tracks from the show remain unreleased: "Get Your Ribbons On" (the original show opener); "Heartbroken Bopper"; "Guns, Guns, Guns"; and "Follow Your Daughter Home".

== Track listing ==
=== Original album ===
Side one

1. "Albert Flasher" (Burton Cummings) - 3:32
2. "New Mother Nature" (Cummings) - 4:39
3. "Glace Bay Blues" (Blair MacLean, Gary MacLean, Don McDougall) - 3:21
4. "Runnin' Back to Saskatoon" (Cummings, Kurt Winter) - 6:16
5. "Pain Train" (Cummings, Winter) - 6:10

==== Side two ====
1. "American Woman" (Randy Bachman, Cummings, Jim Kale, Garry Peterson) - 17:05
2. "Truckin' Off Across the Sky" (Cummings, Kale, McDougall, Peterson, Winter) - 7:15

=== 2000 Buddha CD re-release ===
1. "Pain Train" (Cummings, Winter) - 7:00
2. "Albert Flasher" (Cummings) - 2:59
3. "New Mother Nature" (Cummings) - 4:26
4. "Runnin' Back to Saskatoon" (Cummings, Winter) - 6:52
5. "Rain Dance" (Cummings, Winter) - 2:53
6. "These Eyes" (Bachman, Cummings) - 4:29
7. "Glace Bay Blues" (Blair MacLean, Gary MacLean, Don McDougall) - 3:19
8. "Sour Suite" (Cummings) - 3:58
9. "Hand Me Down World" (Winter) - 3:53
10. "American Woman" (Bachman, Cummings, Kale, Peterson) - 16:53
11. "Truckin' Off Across the Sky" (The Guess Who) - 7:21
12. "Share the Land" (Cummings) - 4:46
13. "No Time" (Bachman, Cummings) - 6:06

== Personnel ==
The Guess Who

- Burton Cummings - lead vocals, piano, harmonica, flute
- Kurt Winter - lead guitar, backing vocals
- Donnie McDougall - lead guitar, acoustic guitar, backing vocals; lead vocals on "Glace Bay Blues"
- Jim Kale - bass, backing vocals
- Garry Peterson - drums, backing vocals

Additional personnel

- Brian Christian - engineer
- Dennis Smith - engineer
- Jack Richardson - producer

== Charts ==
Chart (1972−1973)	Peak position
Australian Albums (Kent Music Report)	55
Canada Top Albums/CDs (RPM)	17
US Billboard 200	39
