= Hang On to Your Life =

Single by The Guess Who

from the album Share the Land
- B-side: "Do You Miss Me Darlin'"
- Released: December 1970 (CAN); January 1971 (US); March 1971 (UK)
- Recorded: 1970 at RCA's Mid-America Recording Center, Chicago, Illinois
- Genre: Rock
- Length: 4:09 (album); 3:20 (single)
- Label: Nimbus Records 0414 (CAN); RCA Victor 0414 (US); RCA Records 2065 (UK)
- Songwriters: Burton Cummings, Kurt Winter
- Producer: Jack Richardson

The Guess Who singles chronology
"Share the Land" (1970)	"Hang On to Your Life" (1970)	"Albert Flasher" (1971)

"Hang On to Your Life" is a song written by Burton Cummings and Kurt Winter and performed by The Guess Who. The song is featured on their 1970 album, Share the Land. The producer was Jack Richardson and the arrangement was by The Guess Who. On the 8-track tape edition of Share the Land, the song was edited to make it a bit longer in order to fill out the timing on the first channel (a few extra measures appear before each verse).

== Background ==
This song is an anti-drug message. In the chorus section, the phrase: "Oh Life", is repeated a few times, in an echo that fades falsely, depicting a heartbeat. ("Oh Life, Oh Life, Oh Life"). Before the song's ending, the "Oh" in the phrase is heard stronger, with the repeated phrase fading in the spoken coda section.

At the end of the album version Cummings recites verses 13-15 of Psalm 22. The single version ends just before he speaks.

== Personnel ==
Personnel taken from Share the Land liner notes.

- Burton Cummings – lead vocals, organ
- Kurt Winter – lead guitar
- Greg Leskiw – lead guitar
- Jim Kale – bass
- Garry Peterson – drums, congas

== Chart performance ==
It reached #5 in Canada and #43 on the Billboard Hot 100 in 1971. It was also released in the United Kingdom as a single, but it did not chart.
