= Niverville Pop Festival =

Canadian rock music festival

The Niverville Pop Festival was a rock music festival held on an acreage southeast of Niverville, Manitoba on May 24, 1970. Held nine months after Woodstock, the festival is widely regarded as the first rock festival in Manitoba and one of the most important festivals in Manitoba rock history.

Attracting a crowd of tens of thousands, the festival included acts such as Joey Gregorash, Brother (featuring Bill Wallace and Kurt Winter), Burton Cummings, Sugar 'n' Spice, John Einarson's Pig Iron Blues Band, The Fifth, Billy Graham Jazz Group and many others. The festival was organized to raise money for the Lynne Derksen Oxygenator Fund. Lynne Derksen was a student at Canadian Mennonite Bible College who had fallen from a hayride, resulting in life-threatening injuries, and required the use of an oxygenator. The festival, which had no expenses, was organized by Kurt Winter, Vance Masters, and Harold Wiebe, and raised about eight thousand dollars for the fund.

Like Woodstock, the Niverville Pop Festival saw heavy rain and large crowds, many of them hippies who came from Winnipeg. After a large thunderstorm struck, many concert-goers stripped naked and ran around in the rain and mud waiting for local Mennonite farmers to tow their cars back to the pavement of Highway 59.
