= Hey Ho =

Hey Ho may refer to:

== Music ==
=== Albums ===
- Hey Ho (What You Do to Me!), by Chad Allan and the Expressions, 1965
- Hey! Ho! Let's Go: The Anthology, by Ramones

=== Songs ===
- "Hey Ho" (Gin Wigmore song), 2010
- "Hey Ho, What You Do to Me", a 1965 song by The Guess Who
- "Hey Ho", by Ludacris from the album Battle of the Sexes
- "Hey Ho!", by Lust (Lords of Acid album)
- "Hey Ho Hey Ho ...", by The Blow Parade
- "(Hey Ho) Move Your Body", by Gibson Brothers
- "Hey - Ho", by The Beachcombers
- "Hey Ho", by Sebastian

== See also ==
- "Hey Joe", a popular rock standard from the 1960s, first performed by the Leaves, notably covered by The Jimi Hendrix Experience
- "Ho Hey", a song by The Lumineers
- "Heigh-Ho", a song from Snow White and the Seven Dwarfs
