= Hand Me Down World =

Single by The Guess Who

from the album Share the Land
- B-side: "Runnin' Down the Street"
- Released: June 1970 (CAN); July 1970 (US); August 1970 (UK)
- Genre: Rock
- Length: 3:26
- Label: Nimbus Records 1863 (CAN); RCA Victor 0367 (US); RCA Records 1994 (UK)
- Songwriter: Kurt Winter
- Producer: Jack Richardson

The Guess Who singles chronology
"American Woman" / "No Sugar Tonight" (1970)	"Hand Me Down World" (1970)	"Share the Land" (1970)

"Hand Me Down World" is song written by Kurt Winter, performed and released in 1970 by The Guess Who, for whom Winter served as lead guitarist from 1970 to 1974 and 1977 to 1978. It reached #10 in Canada, #17 on the Billboard Hot 100, and #65 in Australia. The song was also released in the United Kingdom as a single, but did not chart. It is featured on their 1970 album, Share the Land.

Winter wrote the song while still a member of his pre-Guess Who band Brother. The Guess Who version of the song was produced by Jack Richardson and arranged by The Guess Who.

This song was a rebellion against the older political systems. In the repeated choruses, Cummings and the other vocalists stated that they don't want any hand me down shoes, love, and world, because they "Got one already". Also, the line: "I think we missed it" was another way of going against the establishment.

Cash Box reviewed the song stating "powered by a youth message song and the team’s special fervor, this new Guess Who single maintains the lyric involvement begun by their 'American Woman' giant."

== Personnel ==
- Burton Cummings – lead vocals, electric piano
- Kurt Winter – lead guitar
- Greg Leskiw – lead guitar
- Jim Kale – bass
- Garry Peterson – drums

== Chart performance ==
=== Weekly charts ===
Chart (1970)	Peak position
Australia	65
Canada RPM	10
U.S. Billboard Hot 100	17
U.S. Cash Box Top 100	13

== Other versions ==
- Tesla released a version of the song on their 2007 album, Real to Reel.
