= Share the Land (song) =

Single by The Guess Who

from the album Share the Land
- B-side: "Bus Rider"
- Released: September 1970 (CAN, US); November 1970 (UK)
- Recorded: 1970 at RCA's Mid-America Recording Center, Chicago, Illinois
- Genre: Rock; pop rock
- Length: 3:53
- Label: Nimbus Records 0388 (CAN); RCA Victor 0388 (US); RCA Records 2026 (UK)
- Songwriter: Burton Cummings
- Producer: Jack Richardson

The Guess Who singles chronology
"Hand Me Down World" (1970)	"Share the Land" (1970)	"Hang on to Your Life" (1970)

"Share the Land" is a song written by Burton Cummings and performed by the Guess Who. It reached #2 in Canada, #10 on the Billboard Hot 100, and #63 in Australia in 1970. The song was also released in the United Kingdom as a single, but it did not chart. The song is featured on their 1970 album, Share the Land.

The song was produced by Jack Richardson and arranged by the Guess Who. The song's lyrics looks forward to a future point where the world's land is to be given away and everyone will live together.

== Personnel ==
- Burton Cummings – lead vocals, piano
- Kurt Winter – lead guitar
- Greg Leskiw – lead guitar
- Jim Kale – bass
- Garry Peterson – drums

== Chart positions ==
=== Weekly charts ===
Chart (1970–71)	Peak position
Australia	63
Canada RPM	2
U.S. Billboard Hot 100	10
U.S. Cash Box Top 100	5

=== Year-end charts ===
Chart (1970)	Rank
Canada	27
U.S. (Joel Whitburn's Pop Annual)	89
