= Jukebox (Bachman & Cummings album) =

Studio album by Randy Bachman & Burton Cummings
- Released: June 12, 2007
- Recorded: 2006
- Studios: Metalworks Studios, Toronto, Canada, except "American Woman 2007", recorded live at CBC Soundstage rehearsals, March 2006. Additional piano on "Agent Double-O Soul" recorded at Blue Moon Studio, Agoura Hills, California. Additional recording at The Barn Studios, Salt Spring Island, B.C., Canada
- Genre: Rock
- Label: Sony BMG
- Producers: Randy Bachman & Burton Cummings

Professional ratings
Review scores
Source	Rating
CANOE	link

Jukebox is a studio album from Canadian rock musicians Randy Bachman and Burton Cummings, performing together under the name "The Bachman-Cummings Band". It was released on Sony BMG on June 12, 2007. The album features cover versions of songs from the 1960s that Bachman and Cummings listened to while growing up in Winnipeg, Manitoba. Bachman and Cummings are backed on the album by the Canadian band The Carpet Frogs. The album debuted at #23 on the Canadian Albums Chart.

== Track listing ==
1. "Baby Come Back" – (Eddy Grant) – 2:42
2. "Who Do You Love?" – (Ellas McDaniel) – 5:07
3. "I'm Happy Just to Dance with You" – (Lennon/McCartney) – 3:55
4. "The Walk" – (Jimmy McCracklin) – 3:15
5. "Don't Talk to Him" – (Cliff Richard, Bruce Welch) – 2:55
6. "Man of Mystery" – (Michael Carr) – 2:06
7. "Ain't That Just Like a Woman" – (Claude Demetrius, Fleecie Moore) – 3:05
8. "Little Queenie" – (Chuck Berry) – 4:18
9. "Good Times" – (Sam Cooke) – 2:40
10. "Like a Rolling Stone" – (Bob Dylan) – 6:20
11. "Judy in Disguise (With Glasses)" – (Andrew Bernard, John Fred) – 2:56
12. "Don't You Just Know It" – (Huey "Piano" Smith) – 4:09
13. "Yeh, Yeh" – (Jon Hendricks, Rodgers Grant, Pat Patrick) – 2:55
14. "Agent Double-O Soul" – (Charles Hatcher, Bill Sharpley) – 3:07
15. "The Letter" – (Wayne Carson Thompson) – 4:02
16. "Ain't That Loving You Baby" – (Ivory Joe Hunter, Clyde Otis) – 2:35
17. "American Woman 2007" – (Randy Bachman, Burton Cummings, Jim Kale, Garry Peterson) – 4:43
