= It's Time (The Guess Who album) =

Studio album by The Guess Who
- Released: June 1966
- Recorded: March–May 1966
- Studio: Sound 80, Minneapolis
- Genre: Garage rock
- Length: 30:28
- Label: Quality
- Producer: Bob Burns

The Guess Who chronology
Hey Ho (What You Do to Me!) (1965)	It's Time (1966)	Wheatfield Soul (1969)

Singles from It's Time
- 1. "Believe Me" Released: February 1966; 2. "Clock on the Wall" Released: May 1966; 3. "And She's Mine" Released: 1966

Professional ratings
Review scores
Source	Rating
Allmusic	3.5/5 stars

It's Time is the third studio album by the Canadian rock band The Guess Who. It's the last to feature original lead singer Chad Allan, who left before the release of the album, and the first to include vocalist/keyboard player Burton Cummings. Bruce Decker (of the Deverons) is shown on the cover, but does not appear on the album. "It's Time" was a turning point for the group, moving towards the garage rock style of their later albums.

== Track listing ==
All songs written and composed by Randy Bachman except where noted.

No.	Title	Writer	Length
1.	"All Right"	Jerry Ross, Lester Vanadore	2:24
2.	"And She's Mine"		2:42
3.	"As"		2:26
4.	"You Know He Did"	L. Ransford (pen name for Allan Clarke, Graham Nash, Tony Hicks of the Hollies)	2:04
5.	"Baby Feelin'"	Johnny Kidd	2:03
6.	"Clock on the Wall"		3:04
7.	"Don't Act So Bad"	Jim Kale	3:10
8.	"Believe Me"		2:56
9.	"Seven Long Years"	Burton Cummings	2:47
10.	"One Day"		2:03
11.	"Gonna Search"		2:30
12.	"Guess I'll Find a Place"	Chad Allan	2:24

== Personnel ==
- Chad Allan - lead vocals, rhythm guitar
- Burton Cummings - keyboards, backing vocals and lead on tracks (1, 6, 7, & 9)
- Randy Bachman - lead guitar, backing vocals
- Jim Kale - bass, backing vocals
- Garry Peterson - drums

== Charts ==
Singles

Year	Single	Chart	Position
1966	"Believe Me"	Canada	10
1966	"Clock on the Wall"	Canada	16
1966	"And She's Mine"	Canada	32
