= Believe Me (The Guess Who song) =

- Cover of the 1966 Canadian single

Single by The Guess Who

from the album It's Time
- B-side: "Baby Feelin'"
- Released: February 1966
- Recorded: 1966
- Genre: Rock
- Length: 2:46
- Label: Quality Records 1797 (Canada); Scepter Records 12131 (U.S.)
- Songwriter(s): Randy Bachman
- Producer(s): Bob Burns

The Guess Who singles chronology
"Hurting Each Other" (1966)	"Believe Me" (1966)	"Clock on the Wall" (1966)

"Believe Me" is a song written by Randy Bachman and performed by The Guess Who. It reached #10 in Canada in 1966. The song was released in the United States as a single, but it did not chart. It was featured on their 1966 album, It's Time.

The song was produced by Bob Burns and arranged & sung by Chad Allan. It was the first single to feature Burton Cummings, who would later become the lead singer of the band, on the piano, replacing Bob Ashley.
