= Flavours (album) =

Studio album by the Guess Who
- Released: October 1974
- Recorded: July 1974
- Studios: Sound Stage in Toronto, Ontario, Canada
- Genre: Rock
- Length: 40:20
- Label: RCA Victor
- Producer: Jack Richardson

The Guess Who chronology
Road Food (1974)	Flavours (1974)	Power in the Music (1975)

Singles from Flavours
- 1. "Dancin' Fool" Released: October 1974; 2. "Loves Me Like a Brother" Released: 1975

Professional ratings
Review scores
Source	Rating
AllMusic	2/5 stars
Christgau's Record Guide	C

Flavours is the thirteenth studio album by the Canadian rock band the Guess Who. This was the first album by the group to feature Domenic Troiano on guitar.

== Release history ==
In addition to the usual two-channel stereo version the album was also released by RCA in a four-channel quadraphonic version on both LP and 8-track tape. The quad LP version was released using the Quadradisc system.

The album was first released on compact disc in a "Two-Fer" series, coupled with the album Rockin', although this release was criticized by multiple reviewers for poor sound quality. In 2011, the album was released in remastered form by RCA/conoclassic including previously unreleased demo tracks.

== Track listing ==
All songs written by Burton Cummings and Domenic Troiano.

1. "Dancin' Fool" – 3:34
2. "Hoe Down Time" – 3:52
3. "Nobody Knows His Name" – 3:19
4. "Diggin' Yourself" – 3:42
5. "Seems Like I Can't Live with You, But I Can't Live Without You" – 5:28
6. "Dirty" – 5:30
7. "Eye" – 3:57
8. "Loves Me Like a Brother" – 3:26
9. "Long Gone" – 7:59

2011 Iconoclassic remaster bonus tracks:

1. "A Fool, a Fool, I Met a Fool" (Demo) – 4:09
2. "Save a Smile" (Demo) – 2:58
3. "Roll with the Punches" (Demo) – 4:49
4. "Your Back Yard" (Demo) – 4:04

== Personnel ==
The Guess Who

- Burton Cummings – lead vocals, keyboards
- Domenic Troiano – guitar, mandolin, backing vocals
- Bill Wallace – bass, backing vocals
- Garry Peterson – drums, percussion, backing vocals

Production

- Jack Richardson – producer
- Brian Christian – engineer

== Charts ==
Chart (1974−1975)	Peak position
Australian Albums (Kent Music Report)	81
Canada Top Albums/CDs (RPM)	11
US Billboard 200	48
