= Clap for the Wolfman =

Single by the Guess Who

from the album Road Food
- B-side: "Road Food"
- Released: June 1974
- Recorded: 1973–1974
- Studio: RCA Studio A (Hollywood), Sound Stage (Toronto)
- Genre: Rock and roll; comedy rock
- Length: 3:27 (single version); 4:20 (album version)
- Label: RCA Victor
- Songwriters: Burton Cummings, Bill Wallace, Kurt Winter
- Producer: Jack Richardson

The Guess Who singles chronology
"Star Baby" (1974)	"Clap for the Wolfman" (1974)	"Dancin' Fool" (1974)

"Clap for the Wolfman" is a song written by Burton Cummings, Bill Wallace, and Kurt Winter performed by their band, the Guess Who. The song appeared on their 1974 album, Road Food. The song was ranked #84 on Billboard magazine's Top Hot 100 songs of 1974.

== Background ==
The song is an homage to Wolfman Jack, who is featured talking in his typical on-air DJ voice several times on the recording, including echoing Steve Miller's "pompatus of love" remark (misheard lyric of "the puppetutes of love" in The Medallions' 1954 song "The Letter") from his own contemporary hit "The Joker". Wolfman Jack performed the song with the Guess Who in The Midnight Special and even in some live dates with the group. On other occasions Burton Cummings would impersonate Wolfman Jack's voice.

== Chart performance ==
It reached #4 in Canada and #6 on the Billboard Hot 100 in 1974. It also reached the top 20 in the Netherlands, Belgium and South Africa.

== Charts ==
=== Weekly charts ===
Chart (1974)	Peak position
Australia (Kent Music Report)	39
Belgium	18
Canada RPM Top Singles	4
Netherlands (Dutch Top 40)	9
Netherlands (Single Top 100)	11
South Africa (Springbok Radio)	14
US Billboard Hot 100	6
US Cash Box Top 100	10

=== Year-end charts ===
Chart (1974)	Rank
Canada	65
Netherlands	91
US Billboard Hot 100	84
US Cash Box Top 100	94
