= Share the Land =

Studio album by The Guess Who
- Released: 5 October 1970
- Recorded: 1970
- Studios: RCA's Mid-America Recording Center, Chicago, Illinois
- Genres: Rock; blues rock; hard rock
- Length: 33:48
- Label: RCA Victor
- Producer: Jack Richardson

The Guess Who chronology
American Woman (1970)	Share the Land (1970)	The Best of The Guess Who (1971)

Singles from Share the Land
- 1. "Hand Me Down World" Released: June 1970; 2. "Share the Land" Released: September 1970; 3. "Hang on to Your Life" Released: December 1970

Professional ratings
Review scores
Source	Rating
AllMusic	3.5/5 stars
The Village Voice	C+

Share the Land is the seventh studio album by Canadian rock band The Guess Who, released by RCA Records in October, 1970. It was their first album following the departure of Randy Bachman, and the band brought in two new guitarists, Kurt Winter and Greg Leskiw. The album was another international success for the band, reaching number seven in Canada and number fourteen in the US, and spawned three hit singles in the title track, "Hand Me Down World" and "Hang On to Your Life".

== Release history ==
In addition to the usual 2 channel stereo version, RCA Records issued a 4 channel quadraphonic mix on the 8-track tape format. RCA first reissued the album on compact disc in 1994. Share the Land was remastered and released on CD by RCA/Buddha Records in 2000, including two bonus tracks from post-American Woman sessions featuring Bachman, previously released on the 1976 collection The Way They Were. In 2015, the album was again remastered, this time by Vic Anesini at Iconoclassic Records, including bonus tracks from the time period of the album's initial release.

In 2019 the album was reissued again in the UK by Dutton Vocalion on the Super Audio CD format. This disc is a 2 albums on 1 disc compilation which also contains the 1970 Guess Who album American Woman. The Dutton Vocalion release contains the complete stereo and quad versions of both albums.

== About the album ==
The album's music primarily consists of rock, blues and hard rock. Five songs from the album, "Hand Me Down World", "Bus Rider", "Share the Land", "Do You Miss Me Darlin'?" and "Hang On to Your Life" make up an entire side of the 1971 greatest hits compilation, The Best of The Guess Who.

"Hang On to Your Life" was written by Cummings supposedly after a bad case of sunburn, but many people believe it was written after a bad acid trip. It is an anti-drug song, and was used on commercials to promote stopping the usage of heavy drugs. At the end of the song, Psalm 22:13–15 is quoted. "Hand Me Down World" and "Bus Rider" were from Winter's band Brother, but The Guess Who recorded them before Brother had ever been into a studio. On the 8-track tape edition of the album, the song was edited to make it a bit longer in order to fill out the timing on the first channel (a few extra measures appear before each verse).

=== Album cover ===
When asked how the band knew the Indigenous man on the album's cover, they replied, "central casting". In a 2016 interview with Relix, Burton Cummings was asked about the cover and stated:

Well, don’t forget that the biggest single album of The Guess Who’s career was Share The Land, which was the album that had the Chief of the American Cherokees on the cover. Everybody still thinks I’m native. I just thought that it was a great idea to do that, to put him on the cover. This guy was 81 years old, and we all scampered up a hill for the photo shoot, and he beat us to the top. This guy was crazy; snakes had bitten him something like a hundred times. This guy could bite a snake and kill it, he was 81 and had not a wrinkle on his face.

== Reception ==
Bruce Eder of AllMusic says "Recorded in the immediate aftermath of lead guitarist Randy Bachman's departure from the group, Share the Land was a better album than anyone could rightfully have expected, and it was the biggest selling original album in their entire output, appearing in the wake of "American Woman" and lofted into the Top 20."

Share the Land peaked at number 14 on the Billboard 200 in November 1970.

== Track listing ==
All songs written by Burton Cummings and Kurt Winter except noted.

Side one

1. "Bus Rider" (Winter) – 2:57
2. "Do You Miss Me Darlin'?" – 3:55
3. "Hand Me Down World" (Winter) – 3:26
4. "Moan for You Joe" (Cummings, Greg Leskiw) – 2:39
5. "Share the Land" (Cummings) – 3:53

Side two

6. "Hang On to Your Life" – 4:09
7. "Coming Down Off the Money Bag" / "Song of the Dog" (Leskiw, Cummings) – 3:54
8. "Three More Days" – 8:55

2000 Buddha re-issue bonus tracks

9. "Palmyra" (Bachman, Cummings) – 5:44
10. "The Answer" (Bachman, Cummings) – 4:05

2016 Iconoclassic re-issue bonus tracks

9. "Runnin' Down the Street" (Kale, Peterson) – 4:20
10. "Hang On to Your Life" (Single Version) – 3:25
11. "Moan for You Joe" (Take 3) (Cummings, Leskiw) – 2:24

== Personnel ==
Personnel taken from Share the Land liner notes.

The Guess Who

- Burton Cummings – lead vocals (all except 7), piano (1, 2, 4, 5), electric piano (3, 8), organ (6), flute (8)
- Kurt Winter – lead guitar (1–3, 5, 6, 8), co-lead vocal (1), rhythm guitar (7), acoustic guitar (7)
- Greg Leskiw – lead guitar (3, 5–7), rhythm guitar (1, 2, 8), all guitars (4), lead vocal (7), acoustic guitar (7)
- Jim Kale – bass
- Garry Peterson – drums, glockenspiel (2), congas (6)

Production

- Jack Richardson − producer
- Brian Christian − engineer

== Charts ==
Chart (1970−1971)	Peak position
Canada Top Albums/CDs (RPM)	7
US Billboard 200	14

== Certifications ==
Region	Certification	Certified units/sales
Canada (Music Canada)	Gold	50,000^{^}
United States (RIAA)	Gold	500,000^{^}
^{^} Shipments figures based on certification alone.
