= First Time Around =

2006 film

- DVD cover
- Produced by: Sam Boyd
- Starring: Randy Bachman, Burton Cummings, The Carpet Frogs
- Edited by: Cam LeBlanc
- Music by: Bachman-Turner Overdrive, Burton Cummings, The Guess Who
- Distributed by: Sony BMG
- Release date: November 14, 2006
- Language: English

First Time Around is a one-disk DVD by Randy Bachman and Burton Cummings recorded in 2006 at CBC Studios in Toronto, Canada, by CBC. It was originally shown on CBC in April 2006, but was later released as a DVD with extended footage of the concert. The concert has 20 tracks of songs by Bachman-Turner Overdrive, Burton Cummings, The Guess Who and cover versions of artists such as Sting and Jimi Hendrix.

First Time Around is the first video released with Bachman & Cummings since The Guess Who played at Sars Fest in 2003.

== Track listing ==
1. "American Woman"
2. "Undun"
3. "8:05"
4. "Shape of My Heart"
5. "Takin' Care of Business"
6. "Ain't No More"
7. "Stone Free"
8. "Let It Ride"
9. "Timeless Love"
10. "You Ain't Seen Nothin' Yet" (Cummings' version)
11. "These Eyes"
12. "Laughing"
13. "Our Leaves Are Green Again"
14. "No Time"

== Concert extras and bonus footage ==
1. "My Own Way to Rock"
2. "Mercy Mercy Me"
3. "Hey You"
4. "Lookin' Out For No. 1"
5. "Break It To Them Gently"
6. "You Ain't Seen Nothin' Yet" (BTO version)
7. "American Woman" (single version)
8. "Backstage & rehearsal footage"
