= Star Baby =

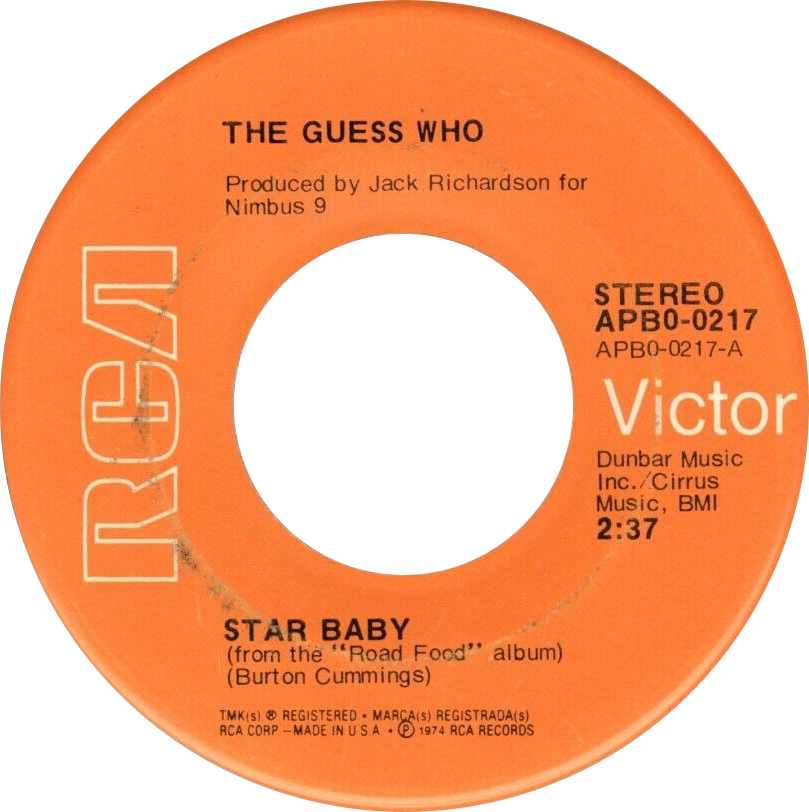
- Side A of the US single

Single by The Guess Who

from the album Road Food
- B-side: "Musicioné"
- Released: February 1974
- Recorded: 1973
- Genre: Rock, power pop
- Length: 2:42
- Label: RCA Victor
- Songwriter(s): Burton Cummings
- Producer(s): Jack Richardson

The Guess Who singles chronology
"Glamour Boy" (1973)	"Star Baby" (1974)	"Clap for the Wolfman" (1974)

Music video
- "Star Baby" (1973 Live TV ) on YouTube

"Star Baby" is a 1974 hit song by The Guess Who. It was written by Burton Cummings who also provided the lead vocals. It is classified in the genre of Power pop and was included on the group's LP entitled, Road Food as well as The Guess Who – Greatest Hits in 1999 and Anthology in 2003. The band performed the song on the Midnight Special television program on December 14, 1973.

"Star Baby" reached number 39 on the US Billboard Hot 100 and number 30 on Cash Box. In Canada, the song spent three weeks at number 9. The song was ranked as the 92nd biggest Canadian hit of 1974. Although The Guess Who had a dozen higher-charting songs in the US, "Star Baby" remained on the chart longer than any of their other hits - 19 weeks, which was four weeks longer than their number-one hit "American Woman".

The song was a major hit in Chicago, peaking at number three and receiving significant airplay on radio superstation WLS as well as on its competing station, WCFL.

== Background ==
Cummings said of the song: "One of our roadies was having an affair with Bonnie Bramlett (from the rock group Delaney & Bonnie), who was opening for us way back in the '70s. When I wrote it I was trying to see Bonnie through our roadie’s eyes and what he might say to her. It was finished really quickly. I wrote that in about 20 minutes."

== Television performance ==
The Guess Who performed "Star Baby" on The Midnight Special television program (season 2, episode 14) on December 14, 1973. Loggins and Messina hosted the show that week. They performed it again on February 22, 1974 (season 2, episode 24) with Gordon Lightfoot hosting and later on March 9, 1974 (season 2, episode 29) when they hosted the show themselves.

== Chart performance ==
=== Weekly charts ===
Chart (1974)	Peak position
Australia (Kent Music Report)	95
Canada RPM Top Singles	9
New Zealand (Listener)	20
US Billboard Hot 100	39
US Cash Box Top 100	30

=== Year-end charts ===
Chart (1974)	Rank
Canada	92
US Billboard Hot 100	238
