= Dancin' Fool (The Guess Who song) =

Single by The Guess Who

from the album Flavours
- B-side: "Seems Like I Can't Live With You, But I Can't Live Without You"
- Released: October 1974 (CAN, US); February 1975 (UK)
- Recorded: 1974
- Genre: Rock
- Length: 3:28
- Label: Nimbus 9 Records 10075 (CAN); RCA Victor 10075 (US); RCA Victor 2502 (UK)
- Songwriters: Burton Cummings, Domenic Troiano
- Producer: Jack Richardson

The Guess Who singles chronology
"Clap for the Wolfman" (1974)	"Dancin' Fool" (1974)	"Loves Me Like a Brother" (1975)

"Dancin' Fool" is a song by Canadian rock band The Guess Who, written by Burton Cummings and Domenic Troiano. The song was released on their 1974 studio album, Flavours and was produced by Jack Richardson.

== Chart performance ==
The song reached #14 in Canada, #28 on the US Billboard Hot 100, and #85 in Australia in 1975. The song was also released in the United Kingdom as a single, but it did not chart.
