= Live at the Paramount =

Live at the Paramount may refer to:

- Live at the Paramount (The Guess Who album)
- Live at the Paramount (video), live video and album by Nirvana
