= Hey Ho (What You Do to Me!) =

Hey Ho, (What You Do to Me!)

Studio album by Chad Allan & The Expressions
- Released: September 1965
- Recorded: 1963–1965
- Studio: CJAY-TV Studio B, Winnipeg; Scepter, New York
- Genre: Garage rock
- Length: 24:07
- Label: Quality
- Producer: Bob Burns

Chad Allan & The Expressions chronology
Shakin' All Over (1965)	Hey Ho, (What You Do to Me!) (1965)	It's Time (1966)

Singles from Hey Ho (What You Do to Me!)
- 1. "Inside Out" Released: 1963; 2. "Stop Teasing Me" Released: 1964; 3. "Hey Ho" Released: 1965; 4. "Hurting Each Other" Released: 1966

Professional ratings
Review scores
Source	Rating
AllMusic	3/5 stars

Hey Ho (What You Do to Me!) is the second studio album by the Canadian rock band The Guess Who. This album is also the last to feature Bob Ashley on keyboards. This album was originally released on Quality Records in 1965. The cover gave credit to "Chad Allan & the Expressions (Guess Who?)". It is regarded as a garage rock album.

== Track listing ==
No.	Title	Writer	Length
1.	"Hey Ho, What You Do to Me"	Jo Armstead, Nickolas Ashford, Valerie Simpson	2:10
2.	"I Should Have Realized"	Chad Allan, Linda Timmins	2:07
3.	"Hurting Each Other"	Gary Geld, Peter Udell	2:19
4.	"Made in England"	Randy Bachman	3:04
5.	"I'll Keep Comin' Back"	Eddie Silvers, Gerry Robinson, Mitch Murray, Neil Levenson	1:54
6.	"Stop Teasing Me"	Randy Bachman	2:37
7.	"Could This Be Love"	Helen Miller, Rose Marie McCoy	2:10
8.	"Theme from a Music Box"	Randy Bachman	2:15
9.	"Don't Be Scared"	Bruce Johnston	2:14
10.	"Inside Out"	Chad Allan	2:07
11.	"Goodnight, Goodnight"	Randy Bachman	2:30

== Personnel ==
- Chad Allan – lead vocals, rhythm guitar
- Randy Bachman – lead guitar, backing vocals
- Jim Kale – bass, backing vocals
- Garry Peterson – drums
- Bob Ashley – keyboards, backing vocals

== Charts ==
Singles

Year	Single	Chart	Position
1965	"Hey Ho, What You Do to Me"	Canada	3
1965	"Hey Ho, What You Do to Me"	Billboard	125
1966	"Hurting Each Other"	Canada	19
