= Cefalu (disambiguation) =

Cefalù or Cefalu may refer to:

- Cefalù, a city and comune in the province of Palermo, Sicily, Italy
- Domenico Cefalù, the boss of the Gambino crime family
- Ernie Cefalu, an American artist
