= Above the Ground =

Studio album by Burton Cummings
- Released: November 4, 2008
- Recorded: 2008
- Studios: Blue Moon Studios; Agoura, California; Fontom Finger Studios; Toronto
- Genre: Rock
- Length: 74:00
- Labels: Sony Canada; Universal
- Producer: Burton Cummings

Burton Cummings chronology
Up Close and Alone (1996)	Above the Ground (2008)

Above the Ground is the eighth studio album by Burton Cummings released in late 2008 on Sony Music Entertainment Canada. It was his first solo recording since 1996, and also was his newest studio album since his 1990 release Plus Signs. In 2010, New Door Records (a Universal Music Group label) released Above the Ground in the United States.

The CD release included a "behind the scenes" DVD that documented the recording process in early 2008. The album cover was designed by Ernie Cefalu. The track "Kurt's Song" is a tribute to Cummings's late The Guess Who bandmate Kurt Winter.

Cummings has stated that the themes of the album were on the meaning of life and thoughts on what growing older is like. An AllMusic review of the album noted that its long run time meant that there was no sense of speed within the songs, but that allowed each track to remain interesting and to cover a number of topics, with the reviewer concluding that it is the "wide range of styles, along with a bit of blunt satire" that make the album, giving it 3/5 stars.

== Track listing ==
All songs written by Burton Cummings.

1. "Crazy If You Mess with the Gods" – 3:49
2. "Junior Won't Behave" – 3:37
3. "TPOS (The Pissed Off Song)" – 3:29
4. "Any Minor Miracle" – 4:08
5. "Powers at Play" – 4:42
6. "Ponderlust" – 4:48
7. "Rollaway" – 1:47
8. "We Just Came from the U.S.A." – 3:35
9. "Pretty Pictures" – 3:38
10. "Look Out Charlie (There's a New Bartender in Town)" – 3:13
11. "Kurt's Song" – 4:45
12. "Whatever Happened to Richard" – 4:49
13. "Dream" – 3:44
14. "Up in the Canyon" – 3:09
15. "A Touch of Morning" – 3:48
16. "Revelation" – 4:24
17. "Invisible" – 3:31
18. "Retribution" – 5:24
19. "Above the Ground" – 4:18

== Personnel ==
- Burton Cummings – lead vocals, keyboards
- Tim Bovaconti – electric & acoustic guitars, background vocals
- David Love – electric & acoustic guitars, background vocals
- Jeff Jones – bass guitar, background vocals
- Sean Fitzsimons – drums, percussion, background vocals
- Nick Sinopoli – background vocals, percussion
- Joe Vannelli – Engineer, Hammond organ
- Ross Vannelli – background vocals on "Any Minor Miracle", additional guitar on "Junior Won't Behave"
