= Ernie Cefalu =

American artist (born 1945)

- Ernie Cefalu, Creative Director
- Born: 15 April 1945 (age 80)
- Website: Original Album Cover Art

Ernie Cefalu (born 1945) is a contemporary artist and Senior Creative Director, currently working out of Los Angeles, CA. He is known for designing art for music albums.

Cefalu attended the California College of Arts and Crafts (now California College of the Arts) and graduated in 1969 with honors. Soon after, Cefalu started his career on Madison Avenue at Carolini Advertising, where his first assignment was to create the campaign and graphics for the International Paper Company's 1970 national sales meeting. His solution took the form of an elaborate, award-winning off-Broadway musical production, Dolls Alive. In the early part of 1970 Cefalu became an Art Director at Norman Levit Advertising where he created the Jesus Christ Superstar album and Angels in an agency shootout with the Decca Records account as the prize.

== Career ==
At the end of 1970, Cefalu joined forces with Craig Braun, Inc. in New York, and worked on The Rolling Stones Sticky Fingers album as well as Grand Funk Railroad's E Pluribus Funk. Eight months later, in mid-1971, he opened a satellite office in California for Braun, the head Creative Director. There, he was the creative force behind a string of famous album covers for Alice Cooper's School's Out, and Cheech & Chong's Big Bambu. He is also credited with being one of the people to design The Rolling Stones "Lips and Tongue" logo.

Cefalu opened his own agency, Pacific Eye & Ear, in January 1972. Over the next 15 years, he created another 194 album covers for rock artists such as The Doors, Alice Cooper, Aerosmith, The Bee Gees, The Guess Who, Black Sabbath, Jefferson Airplane, the Modern Jazz Quartet, Burton Cummings, Grand Funk Railroad, Iron Butterfly, and Black Oak Arkansas. Cefalu's collaborations with then emerging illustrators such as Drew Struzan, Bill Garland, Joe Petagno, Carl Ramsey, Ingrid Haenke and Joe Garnet led Pacific Eye & Ear's quest to become one of the top album design companies in the country.

In 1985, Cefalu formed David Hale Associates and broadened his client roster beyond the music industry to include the food companies Nestle and Kraft. Over the next decade and a half, his work helped more than 20 brands in five divisions post double-digit sales growth. In 1990 he was retained by Panavision Motion Picture Cameras, NGK Spark Plugs and Rockwell International. In 1996, Cefalu also added retail chain Kmart, motion picture studios Paramount, Universal, and Disney, National Hot Rod Association and Valvoline, and Wolfgang Puck's La Brea Bakery. Before the end of 2010 Cefalu had expanded his client roster to welcome Fortune 100 companies InBev, Honeywell/Novar and Avery Dennison.

== Awards and recognition ==
Thus far in his career, Cefalu has received three Grammy nominations and ten Music Hall of Fame Awards for his album cover work, as well as four Awards of Excellence from Art Directors Clubs. He has also been presented with 15 gold albums and a triple platinum album by the bands whose album covers he designed. With the 2008 release of Burton Cummings' latest album, Above the Ground, and the 2011 release for Alice Cooper's Old School box set, Cefalu has 212 total album covers to his credit.

== Present ==
Today, as Owner/Creative Director of HornbookInc, the Internet's first virtual agency, Cefalu is retained by four Fortune 100 companies as their internal Creative Director. He continues to take on select, music-related projects.

== OriginalAlbumCoverArt.com ==
Cefalu has assembled a large, privately owned collection of original album cover art and music-related illustration. This body of over 260 signed, original pieces of art, highlighted at www.originalalbumcoverart.com, features the previously unavailable work of illustrators Drew Struzan, Bill Garland, Joe Petagno, Carl Ramsey, Ingrid Haenke, Joe Garnet and many others.

== Other notable works ==
- Iron Butterfly, Scorching Beauty
- Earth Wind & Fire, Open Our Eyes
- Black Sabbath, Sabbath, Bloody Sabbath
- Jefferson Airplane, Baron Von Tollbooth & the Chrome Nun
- Alice Cooper, Greatest Hits
- Alice Cooper, Welcome To My Nightmare
- Tony Orlando and Dawn, To Be With You
- Aerosmith, Toys in the Attic
- Aerosmith, 'Rocks'
- West, Bruce and Laing, Whatever Turns You On
- Alice Cooper, Billion Dollar Babies
- Black Oak Arkansas, Early Times
- Melanie, Live At Carnegie Hall
- Alice Cooper, Alice At The Palace Poster
- David Bowie, Serious Moonlight Tour Logo
- Modern Jazz Quartet, In Memoriam
- Canned Heat One More River to Cross
- The Bee Gees Main Course
- Burton Cummings Above the Ground
- Alice Cooper, Old School Box Set
- Alice Cooper, Welcome 2 My Nightmare
- The Guess Who, Artificial Paradise
- Lou Reed, 'Berlin'
