= Heartbroken Bopper =

- Cover of the 1972 American single

Single by The Guess Who

from the album Rockin'
- B-side: "Arrivederci Girl"
- Released: February 1972
- Recorded: 1972 at RCA's Music Center of the World, Hollywood, California
- Genre: Rock, hard rock
- Length: 4:52; 3:12 (single version)
- Label: RCA Victor
- Songwriters: Burton Cummings, Kurt Winter
- Producer: Jack Richardson

The Guess Who singles chronology
"Sour Suite" (1971)	"Heartbroken Bopper" (1972)	"Guns, Guns, Guns" (1972)

"Heartbroken Bopper" is a popular rock song written by Burton Cummings and Kurt Winter.

The song was recorded by the Canadian rock group The Guess Who for the album Rockin' and is also included on the 1974 album The Best of the Guess Who, Vol. 2.

== Chart performance ==
The single release spent seven weeks on the Billboard charts peaking at #47 on the Billboard Hot 100 during the week of April 8, 1972. The song reached #12 in Canada and #83 in Australia.
