= Stand Tall (Burton Cummings song) =

- Side A of the Canadian single

Single by Burton Cummings

from the album Burton Cummings
- B-side: "Burch Magic"
- Released: October 1976
- Recorded: 1976
- Genre: Pop
- Length: 3:20 (single version); 3:43 (album version); 4:32 (extended album version)
- Label: Portrait
- Songwriter: Burton Cummings
- Producer: Richard Perry

Burton Cummings singles chronology
"Stand Tall" (1976)	"I'm Scared" (1977)

"Stand Tall" is an international hit single by Burton Cummings from his eponymous debut album. The song was released less than two years after "Dancin' Fool", the final hit single by the group for which Cummings had been lead singer, The Guess Who.

The recording was issued as the album's lead single in the fall of 1976, spending 21 weeks on the US Billboard Hot 100 and reaching number 10. It reached number 5 on the US Cash Box Top 100 and spent four weeks at number 4 in Canada. The track became a Gold record.

On the adult contemporary charts, "Stand Tall" reached number two in the US and number one in Canada.

While the song was climbing the charts, Casey Kasem reported on American Top 40 that shortly following Cummings' departure from The Guess Who to pursue a solo career, his girlfriend of nine years left him for another man. "Stand Tall" was born from him taking his frustration, challenges and despondency to the piano and forging the melody there.

In his native Canada, Burton Cummings was nominated for the Juno Award as 1977 Composer of the Year for "Stand Tall".

== Chart performance ==
=== Weekly charts ===
Chart (1976–1977)	Peak position
Australia (Kent Music Report)	5
Canada RPM Top Singles	4
Canada Adult Contemporary	1
New Zealand (RIANZ)	14
South Africa (Springbok)	10
US Billboard Hot 100	10
US Billboard Easy Listening	2
US Cash Box Top 100	5

=== Year-end charts ===
Chart (1976)	Rank
Canada	59

Chart (1977)	Rank
Australia (Kent Music Report)	53
Canada	103
US Billboard Hot 100	63
