= Spice (Canadian band) =

Canadian band

- Also known as: Sugar 'n' Spice
- Origin: Winnipeg, Manitoba, Canada
- Genres: Pop, folk
- Years active: 1967–1973
- Label: Franklin
- Past members: Phil O'Connell; Kenn Richard; John MacInnes; Geoff Marin; Kathleen Murphy; Maureen Murphy; Aileen Murphy; Larry Mahler; Chuck Gorling; Mike Elliot; Steve Banman; Brian Meissner; Laurie Currie; Suzanne Moirer; Bob Walker; Bob White

Spice, originally Sugar & Spice, was a Canadian pop and folk band based in Winnipeg, Manitoba, active from 1967 to 1973.

== History ==
The band sprung from a Winnipeg cover band called The Griffins, which was founded in 1965 and consisted of guitarists Phil O'Connell and Ron Harder, singer Don Carrier, drummer Kenn Richard, and bassist Larry Mahler. Michael Gillespie came in as the band's manager; Harder left and was replaced by Ken Lowry on keyboards. In 1967, Geoff Marin and John McInnes, from the Winnipeg band The Mongrels, joined the group. McInnes brought in his girlfriend, Kathleen Murphy, and her sisters Maureen and Aileen, all of whom were singers. The band's name was changed to Sugar & Spice, and they were signed to Franklin, an independent Winnipeg label.

In 1968, Sugar & Spice released two singles written by Randy Bachman–"Not to Return" and "I Don't Need Anything". Two others, "Day by Day" and "It's Growin'" were barely noticed, but "Not to Return" got heavy airplay in Winnipeg and modest airplay in other markets. The band began playing shows throughout the prairies and into Ontario, beginning with the University of Manitoba's Winter Carnival.

The group's biggest hit was in 1969, with a cover of Peter Paul & Mary's "Cruel War", which sold 23,000 copies and topped the RPM Canadian Content Chart in March that year, rising to #31 on the RPM Top Singles Chart. The record was produced by Bob Burns, who hosted the Winnipeg television program Teen Dance Party. The band performed on the show, and that led to several high-profile gigs, including opening for Sonny & Cher and The Who. They also performed the song on the CJAY television show Young As You Are.

The band replaced Gillespie with new manager Frank Weiner; from there, the band would see constant personnel changes. But, in late 1969, they released another charting single, "Something to Believe", (#90) written by Russell Thornberry of The New Christy Minstrels. Thornberry also wrote the B side, "Without You Babe", which did not chart. The band headlined at the Manitoba's first rock festival the Niverville Pop Festival in the summer of 1970. Two more singles written by Bachman, "Whisper Girl Shining" and "Judith and the Windswept" also failed to chart.

By 1970, two Saskatoon musicians had joined the band—Brian Meissner and drummer Laurie Currie—and the band released two more singles, with Meissner on vocals: "Angeline" and "It's Been a Long Time". By 1971, there was one female voice left in the band and they decided to drop the 'Sugar' from their moniker. Spice released a single with two songs written by Meissner: "Sweet Talkin' Woman" which reached #52 before the b-side "Strawberry Wine" became more popular and peaked at #25. A second single, "Just A Little Love" backed with "Angeline" was also released.

In 1972, the band relocated to Toronto, where they were briefly managed by Rush manager Ray Danniels. But they failed to find traction and disbanded in 1973.
