= Clock on the Wall =

- Cover of the 1967 Dutch single

Single by the Guess Who

from the album It's Time
- B-side: "One Day"
- Released: May 1966
- Genre: Garage rock
- Length: 3:04
- Label: Quality Records 1815 (Canada); Scepter Records 12144 (U.S.)
- Songwriter(s): Randy Bachman
- Producer(s): Bob Burns

The Guess Who singles chronology
"Believe Me" (1966)	"Clock on the Wall" (1966)	"And She's Mine" (1966)

"Clock on the Wall" is a song written by Randy Bachman and performed by the Guess Who. It reached number 16 in Canada in 1966. The song was released in the United States as a single, but it did not chart. It was featured on their 1966 album, It's Time.

The song was produced by Bob Burns and sung by Burton Cummings.
