= John Einarson =

Canadian music historian (born 1952)

John Einarson OM (born 1952) is a Canadian rock music historian, journalist and writer from Winnipeg, Manitoba.

Einarson is the author or co-author of more than a dozen books, including biographies and autobiographies of Neil Young, the Guess Who, Steppenwolf, the Byrds, Buffalo Springfield, Ian and Sylvia, and the Flying Burrito Brothers. As a rock journalist, Einarson has been a contributor to Mojo, Uncut, Goldmine, the Winnipeg Free Press, and many other publications.

A graduate of the University of Manitoba, Einarson taught high school at St. John's-Ravenscourt School for 18 years and leads tours of Winnipeg rock and roll history. He was the curator of a 2009 exhibit about Manitoba music history at the Manitoba Museum and is in charge of the forthcoming Manitoba Music Museum. Einarson also wrote a CBC documentary about Randy Bachman and a Juno Awards-nominated documentary on Buffy Sainte-Marie.

He began his music career in the 1970s as part of the Pig Iron Blues Band, performing at the Niverville Pop Festival and opening for Led Zeppelin with his band Euphoria in 1970, when he was 17 and a recent graduate of Grant Park High School.
