= Runnin' Back to Saskatoon =

- Label of the US single

Single by The Guess Who

from the album Live at the Paramount
- B-side: "New Mother Nature"
- Released: September 1972
- Recorded: May 22, 1972
- Venue: Paramount Theater, Seattle, Washington
- Genre: Rock
- Length: 6:24
- Label: RCA Victor
- Songwriters: Burton Cummings, Kurt Winter
- Producer: Jack Richardson (for Nimbus Nine)

The Guess Who singles chronology
"Guns, Guns, Guns" (1972)	"Runnin' Back to Saskatoon" (1972)	"Follow Your Daughter Home" (1972)

"Runnin' Back to Saskatoon" is a song written by Burton Cummings and Kurt Winter.

The song was recorded by the Canadian rock group The Guess Who on May 22, 1972, for the album Live at the Paramount and is also included on their 1974 album The Best of the Guess Who, Vol. 2.

The single release spent three weeks on the Billboard Hot 100 peaking at #96 during the week of October 28, 1972. The song reached #9 in Canada. The band never recorded a studio version of the song and the hit single version is the live recording from May 22, 1972, which was edited/shortened from 6m24s to 3m27s for AM radio airplay.

Places mentioned in the song are Saskatoon, Moose Jaw, and Moosomin, which are all in Saskatchewan, as well as two cities in Alberta — Red Deer and Medicine Hat, one in British Columbia — Terrace, and Hong Kong.

Burton Cummings lived in Sherman Oaks, California, for many years until moving to Moose Jaw, Saskatchewan, in 2017.

The song was covered by Pearl Jam at the Credit Union Centre in Saskatoon, Saskatchewan on September 7, 2005, and then again on September 19, 2011, during their PJ20 Anniversary tour. Eddie Vedder admittedly messed up the lyrics to the song during the first run through of the song in the performance. In order to redeem the band and appeal to the Saskatoon crowd, the band played the song once more before the end of the concert. This time, they invited a fan from the crowd to sing the correct lyrics.

Burton Cummings released "Running Back to Saskatoon" in October 2012 on the album Massey Hall, recorded live in Toronto at Massey Hall, backed by his band The Carpet Frogs. The album contains many Guess Who and solo hits from his career.
