= So Long, Bannatyne =

Studio album by The Guess Who
- Released: July 1971
- Recorded: 1971
- Studios: RCA's Mid-America Recording Center, Chicago, Illinois
- Genre: Rock
- Length: 41:48
- Label: RCA Victor
- Producer: Jack Richardson

The Guess Who chronology
The Best of The Guess Who (1971)	So Long, Bannatyne (1971)	Rockin' (1972)

Singles from So Long, Bannatyne
- 1. "Rain Dance" Released: July 1971; 2. "Sour Suite" Released: October 1971

Professional ratings
Review scores
Source	Rating
AllMusic	3/5 stars

So Long, Bannatyne is the eighth studio album by the Canadian rock band The Guess Who, released in 1971 by RCA Records.

== Background ==
The album's title track includes the words:

So long Bannatyne, hello my Chevrier home.

The album's packaging and title track illustrate a transition in the life of Guess Who guitarist Kurt Winter, moving from the city to the suburbs. The front cover has the words "So Long, Bannatyne" and shows the band dressed casually around a red Chevrolet with a Manitoba license plate in front of The Bannatyne Apartments (located at 545 Bannatyne Avenue in the band's hometown of Winnipeg). The back cover has the words "Hello, My Chevrier Home" and shows the band now dressed more formally with the same red Chevrolet in the back of a home located on Chevrier Boulevard, about 5 miles from downtown Winnipeg.

In 2015 the Bannatyne Apartments building, while vacant, was damaged by fire.

== Track listing ==
All songs written by Burton Cummings and Kurt Winter except where noted.

Side one

1. "Rain Dance" – 2:45
2. "She Might Have Been a Nice Girl" (Cummings) – 3:13
3. "Goin' a Little Crazy" – 6:59
4. "Fiddlin'" – 1:06
5. "Pain Train" – 3:45
6. "One Divided" (Greg Leskiw) – 2:38

Side two

7. "Grey Day" (Leskiw) – 4:16
8. "Life in the Bloodstream" (Cummings) – 3:10
9. "One Man Army" – 3:55
10. "Sour Suite" (Cummings) – 4:08
11. "So Long, Bannatyne" – 5:55

Bonus Tracks (2010 Iconoclassic CD Release)

12. "Albert Flasher" (Cummings) – 3:06
13. "Broken" – 2:44

=== 8-Track ===
- The 8-track release featured a different ordering of tracks due to the practical need to balance as closely as possible the play time of each of the four programs:

Program 1: "Life in the Bloodstream", "Fiddlin'", "So Long, Bannatyne"

Program 2: "Rain Dance", "Sour Suite", "Pain Train"

Program 3: "One Divided", "One Man Army", "Grey Day"

Program 4: "She Might Have Been a Nice Girl", "Goin' a Little Crazy"

== Personnel ==
Personnel taken from So Long, Bannatyne liner notes.

The Guess Who

- Burton Cummings – lead vocals, piano, saxophone
- Kurt Winter – lead guitar, backing vocals
- Greg Leskiw – rhythm guitar, backing vocals, lead vocal and banjo on "One Divided"
- Jim Kale – bass
- Garry Peterson – drums, backing vocals

Additional personnel

- Brian Christian – engineer
- Jack Richardson – producer

== Charts ==
Chart (1971)	Peak position
Canada Top Albums/CDs (RPM)	10
US Billboard 200	52
