= Rockin' (The Guess Who album) =

Studio album by the Guess Who
- Released: February 1972
- Recorded: January 1972
- Studios: RCA's Mid-America Recording Center, Chicago, Illinois
- Genre: Rock
- Length: 38:11
- Label: RCA Victor
- Producer: Jack Richardson

The Guess Who chronology
| So Long, Bannatyne (1971) | Rockin' (1972) | Live at the Paramount (1972) |

Singles from Rockin'
- 1. "Heartbroken Bopper" Released: March 1972; 2. "Guns, Guns, Guns" Released: May 1972

Professional ratings
Review scores
| Source | Rating |
|---|---|
| Allmusic | 2/5 stars |

Rockin' is the ninth album by the Canadian rock band the Guess Who. It was originally released by RCA Records in 1972. It is the last album by the group to feature rhythm guitarist Greg Leskiw and the last studio album to feature bassist Jim Kale (though the latter would later form an unofficial version of the Guess Who).

Two charting singles were released from the album. "Heartbroken Bopper" spent seven weeks on the Billboard Hot 100 peaking at number 47 and "Guns, Guns, Guns" spent six weeks on the Billboard Hot 100 peaking at number 70.

== Release history ==
In addition to the usual 2 channel stereo version the album was also released by RCA in a 4 channel quadraphonic version on 8-track tape. The quad version was never released on the LP format.

In 2019 the album was reissued again in the UK by Dutton Vocalion on the Super Audio CD format. This disc is a 2 albums on 1 disc compilation which also contains the 1973 album The Best of The Guess Who Volume II. The Dutton Vocalion release contains the complete stereo and quad versions of both albums.

== Track listing ==
All songs written by Burton Cummings and Kurt Winter except noted.

Side one

1. "Heartbroken Bopper" - 4:52
2. "Get Your Ribbons On" - 2:36
3. "Smoke Big Factory" (Cummings, Winter, Jim Kale) - 3:57
4. "Arrivederci Girl" (Cummings) - 2:31
5. "Guns, Guns, Guns" (Cummings) - 4:59

Side two

6. "Running Bear" (J.P. Richardson) - 2:19
7. "Back to the City" - 3:37
8. "Your Nashville Sneakers" (Cummings) - 2:55
9. "Herbert's a Loser" (Greg Leskiw, Winter) - 3:35
10. "Hi Rockers!" - 6:50

a) "Sea of Love" (Phil Phillips, George Khoury)
b) "Heaven Only Moved Once Yesterday" (Winter)
c) "Don't You Want Me" (Cummings)

2010 Iconoclassic Remaster Bonus Tracks

11. "Sea of Love" (Previously Unreleased)
12. "Lost Sheep" (Previously Unreleased)

=== Notes ===
On the album the song "Running Bear" was incorrectly credited to Curly Herdman and "Sea of Love" incorrectly credited to Don McGinnis.

== Personnel ==
The Guess Who

- Burton Cummings - lead vocals, keyboards, harmonica
- Kurt Winter - lead guitar, backing vocals
- Greg Leskiw - rhythm guitar, backing vocals, lead vocals on "Herbert's a Loser"
- Jim Kale - bass, backing vocals
- Garry Peterson - drums

Additional personnel

- Brian Christian - engineer
- Jack Richardson - producer

== Charts ==
| Chart (1972) | Peak position |
|---|---|
| Australian Albums (Kent Music Report) | 33 |
| Canada Top Albums/CDs (RPM) | 9 |
| US Billboard 200 | 79 |
