= MacLean & MacLean =

Canadian musical comedy duo

- Origin: Winnipeg, Manitoba, Canada
- Genres: Comedy music
- Years active: 1972–1998
- Past members: Gary MacLean; Blair MacLean

MacLean & MacLean were a Canadian musical comedy duo. They performed regularly in Canada between 1972 and 1998 and recorded seven albums. The duo consisted of brothers Gary MacLean (1944–2001) and Blair MacLean (1942–2008). The MacLeans were originally from Glace Bay, Nova Scotia, but were later based in Winnipeg, Manitoba.

MacLean & MacLean were best known for their often scatological humour, which was combined with (usually humorous) renditions of folk and popular songs, with Blair playing guitar and Gary playing banjo and bongo drums. The duo began performing in 1972 and during their career played the Commodore Ballroom in Vancouver, British Columbia, the 1983 Just for Laughs festival in Montreal, Quebec, and the Edinburgh Festival Fringe.

In 1974, the pair were asked to leave a tour because of the offensive content of their show.

== Recordings ==
An early mention of the group appears in the spoken introduction to "Glace Bay Blues" by Donnie McDougall of The Guess Who on their 1972 album, Live at the Paramount, in which he explains the song was co-written with "MacLean MacLean" (they had not included the word "and" in the name of their act in their early days). Despite the spoken credit, the original album only credited McDougall as the writer. This was corrected in a recent re-issue which lists the composers as MacLean, MacLean, and McDougall.

During their career, they recorded seven albums including a mixture of live and studio recordings. Among their best known (and most infamous) recordings were "I've Seen Pubic Hair" (based upon the well-known "I've Been Everywhere") and an original song, "Dolly Parton's Tits", which made the British music charts after it was used as the theme music for a British TV show called O.T.T..

Their first album was a live recording titled Toilet Rock, produced by Skip Prokop of Lighthouse. Burton Cummings of the Guess Who appears on and produced the studio portions of their second album, Bitter Reality, although his management tried unsuccessfully to have his contribution (singing two short "dirty" songs) removed, fearing it would be harmful to his career. This challenge caused the album's release to be delayed by several months, by which time the controversy had been widely reported by the media, and the track had been "leaked" to a Toronto radio station which played it on a weekly show featuring comedy records, making the attempted removal a futile effort, and the album was released with Cummings' contributions intact. Jack Richardson, the producer of the Guess Who's albums, produced the live portions of this album.

Controversial for their use of strong language, at one point they had to appeal for the right to perform at the level of the Supreme Court of Canada. The title of their album Locked Up for Laughs refers to an incident when they were actually put in jail in Kingston, Ontario, after a charge of public indecency at a live performance. Their theme song was a rendition of "Ja-Da" retitled "Fuck Ya", and it appeared on all of their albums in one form or another. It was often used as a closing to their live shows, following a "mutual heckling" routine in which the audience and performers jokingly shouted abuse at each other; the song would then be performed as a "sing-along" with the audience. The back cover of Toilet Rock claims this song (the altered version) was written by Burton Cummings, although later albums credit it to the MacLeans. The cover also claims, "we all wrote 'Lickin' My Dick'", but it's not clear whether "all" is meant to include Cummings and/or Prokop; the song in question is heard as a brief warm-up before the proper start of the performance, with Blair MacLean announcing (perhaps as a direction to the editor), "That's not going to be on the album!"

== Later years ==
In the 1980s, the MacLeans created a character called "The Champ". This character was licensed to, and further developed by, radio personality "Brother" Jake Edwards. Edwards performed a daily two-minute Champ monologue for syndication to radio stations in Canada for 20 years, the longest running feature of this type in Canadian history. A sample of the MacLeans' version of the Champ can be found on Cruel Cuts, but it was Edwards who gave the character his distinctive gruff voice. Edwards also released four CDs of selected Champ monologues, and a fifth Champ CD described as being "a little more risque than the radio program".

The duo toured on and off for nearly three decades. In later years, they worked in radio. Gary MacLean became a radio personality in Winnipeg, while Blair took up a new profession as a landscape painter. The duo performed for the last time not long before Gary MacLean died of throat cancer in 2001. Following Gary's death, Blair MacLean privately released a CD entitled Live, a recording of a 1996 performance in Moose Jaw, Saskatchewan, to raise money for a trust fund for his brother's children.

Blair MacLean died on 29 October 2008 at age 65 due to a heart attack.

== The Maclean Brothers ==
All three of Gary's sons work in the music end of show business under the band name The MacLean Brothers fronted by singer/songwriter Michael Vermeylen out of Winnipeg, Manitoba, Canada. In early 2010, they played a successful one-month tour of South Korea.

== Discography ==
- Toilet Rock (1974, live at the Chimney, Toronto)
- Bitter Reality (1976, mixture of studio, and live at the Chimney, Toronto)
- MacLean & MacLean Suck Their Way to the Top / MacLean & MacLean Take the "O" Out of Country (1980, split album: side 1 is live at the El Mocambo, Toronto; side 2 is a studio recording simulating a country music radio broadcast)
- Locked Up for Laughs (1981, studio recording)
- Go to Hell (1983, studio recording, title can also be read as MacLean & MacLean Go to Hell)
- Cruel Cuts (1985, studio recording)
- The Dirty Thirty (1989, compilation)
- 2 in 1 (1992, re-issue of first and second albums on one CD; omits some tracks to make it fit)
- 2 in 1 (1992, re-issue of third and fourth albums on one CD)
- Live (2003, live at Watts, Moose Jaw, Saskatchewan, 1996)
