= Road Food =

1974 album by The Guess Who

Studio album by the Guess Who
- Released: 7 April 1974
- Recorded: 1973–1974
- Studios: RCA's Studio A in Hollywood, California and the Sound Stage, Toronto
- Genre: Rock
- Length: 36:05
- Label: RCA Victor
- Producer: Jack Richardson

The Guess Who chronology
The Best of The Guess Who Volume II (1973)	Road Food (1974)	Flavours (1974)

Singles from Road Food
- 1. "Star Baby" Released: February 1974; 2. "Clap for the Wolfman" Released: June 1974

Professional ratings
Review scores
Source	Rating
AllMusic	2.5/5 stars

Road Food is the twelfth studio album by the Canadian rock band the Guess Who, originally released in 1974 by RCA Records. It was the last album by the group to feature guitarists Kurt Winter and Donnie McDougall.

== Release history ==
In addition to the usual two-channel stereo version, RCA also issued the album in a four-channel quadraphonic version on both LP and 8-track tape. The quad LP version was released using the Quadradisc system.

On the first RCA CD reissue, the two sides of the original LP were reversed, thus the album begins with side two and "Clap for the Wolfman", rather than side one and "Star Baby". In 2012, the album was reissued on CD by RCA/Iconolassic with two bonus tracks. In 2018, the album was reissued again in the UK by Dutton Vocalion on the Super Audio CD format. This disc is a two albums on one disc compilation which also contains the 1973 album #10. The Dutton Vocalion release contains the complete stereo and quadraphonic versions of both albums.

== Track listing ==
All songs written by Burton Cummings except noted.

Side one

1. "Star Baby" – 2:38
2. "Attila's Blues" (The Guess Who) – 4:54
3. "Straighten Out" (Cummings, Wallace) – 2:22
4. "Don't You Want Me" – 2:20
5. "One Way Road to Hell" (Cummings, Wallace) – 5:26

Side two

6. "Clap for the Wolfman" (Cummings, Wallace, Winter) – 4:15
7. "Pleasin' for Reason" (McDougall, Cummings) – 3:17
8. "Road Food" (Wallace, Cummings) – 3:39
9. "Ballad of the Last Five Years" – 7:15

2012 Iconoclassic Remaster Bonus Tracks

10. "Sona Sona" (sans 1988 overdubs)
11. "One Way Road to Hell" (run through) (Cummings, Wallace)

== Personnel ==
The Guess Who

- Burton Cummings – lead vocals, keyboards
- Kurt Winter – lead guitar
- Donnie McDougall – rhythm guitar, backing vocals
- Bill Wallace – bass, backing vocals
- Garry Peterson – drums

Additional personnel

- Eugene Amaro – tenor horn on "Don't You Want Me"
- Jack Zaza – tenor horn on "Don't You Want Me"
- Gary Morgan – baritone horn on "Don't You Want Me"
- Wolfman Jack − voice on "Clap for the Wolfman"
- Allan Macmillan− arrangement on "Don't You Want Me"
- Ben McPeek− arrangement on "Ballad of the Last Five Years"
- Jack Richardson − producer
- Brian Christian − engineer

== Charts ==
Chart (1974)	Peak position
Australian Albums (Kent Music Report)	87
Canada Top Albums/CDs (RPM)	28
US Billboard 200	60
