= No. 10 (The Guess Who album) =

1973 album by The Guess Who

#10

Studio album by the Guess Who
- Released: June 1973
- Recorded: 1973
- Studios: RCA's Music Center of the World, Hollywood, California
- Genre: Rock
- Length: 41:11
- Label: RCA Victor
- Producer: Jack Richardson

The Guess Who chronology
Artificial Paradise (1973)	#10 (1973)	The Best of The Guess Who Volume II (1973)

Singles from #10
- 1. "Glamour Boy" Released: May 1973

Professional ratings
Review scores
Source	Rating
AllMusic	2/5 stars

#10 is the eleventh album by the Canadian rock band the Guess Who. It was first released in 1973. The title comes from the fact that it was the band's tenth release for RCA Records. This number series includes both a live album and a best-of compilation, but not the band's early studio recordings (prior to 1969) which were not recorded for RCA.

== Release history ==
In addition to the usual 2 channel stereo version, RCA also released the album in a 4 channel quadraphonic version on both LP and 8-track tape. The quad LP version was released using the Quadradisc system.

The 2012 reissue by Iconoclassic marked the first time the album was made available on CD in the United States. It has upgraded sound quality compared to previous CD releases, and a previously unreleased, stripped-down mix of "Glamour Boy" without the sound effects and crowd noise.

In 2018, the album was reissued again in the UK by Dutton Vocalion on the Super Audio CD format. This disc is a 2 albums on 1 disc compilation which also contains the 1974 album Road Food. The Dutton Vocalion release contains the complete stereo and quad versions of both albums.

== Track listing ==
All songs written by Burton Cummings except noted.

Side one

1. "Take It Off My Shoulders" (McDougall, Cummings) - 4:03
2. "Musicioné" (Cummings, Winter, McDougall, Wallace, Peterson) - 3:55
3. "Miss Frizzy" (Bachman, Cummings) - 4:25
4. "Glamour Boy" - 5:27

Side two

5. "Self Pity" - 4:22
6. "Lie Down" - 4:43
7. "Cardboard Empire" (Wallace, Winter) - 3:25
8. "Just Let Me Sing" - 6:13

2012 Iconoclassic Remaster Bonus Track

9. "Glamour Boy" (Remix - sans string arrangement & sound effects) - 4:49

== Personnel ==
The Guess Who

- Burton Cummings – lead vocals, keyboards
- Kurt Winter – lead guitar
- Donnie McDougall − rhythm guitar, backing vocals
- Bill Wallace – bass, backing vocals
- Garry Peterson – drums

Additional personnel

- Ron Halldorson − pedal steel guitar on "Take It Off My Shoulders" and "Lie Down"
- Jack Richardson − producer
- Brian Christian − engineer

== Charts ==
Chart (1973)	Peak position
Canada Top Albums/CDs (RPM)	7
US Billboard 200	155
