= Guns, Guns, Guns =

- Cover of the 1972 Spanish single

Single by The Guess Who

from the album Rockin'
- B-side: "Heaven Only Moved Once Yesterday"
- Released: May 1972
- Recorded: 1972 at RCA's Music Center of the World, Hollywood, California
- Genre: Rock and roll
- Length: 4:59
- Label: RCA Victor
- Songwriter: Burton Cummings
- Producer: Jack Richardson

The Guess Who singles chronology
"Heartbroken Bopper" (1972)	"Guns, Guns, Guns" (1972)	"Runnin' Back to Saskatoon" (1972)

"Guns, Guns, Guns" is a popular rock and roll song written by Burton Cummings recorded by the Canadian rock group The Guess Who for the album Rockin'. It is also included on their 1974 compilation album The Best of the Guess Who, Vol. 2.

The single release spent six weeks on the Billboard Hot 100 peaking at #70 during the week of June 10, 1972. The song also reached #58 in Canada.

Cummings did a remake of the song on his 1978 solo album Dream of a Child.
