= Hey Ho, What You Do to Me =

Single by Chad Allan and the Expressions (Guess Who?)

from the album Hey Ho (What You Do to Me!)
- B-side: "Goodnight, Goodnight"
- Released: September 1965
- Genre: Beat, Blue-eyed soul
- Length: 2:10
- Label: Scepter; Quality
- Songwriter(s): Nickolas Ashford; Valerie Simpson; Jo Armstead
- Producer(s): Bob Burns

The Guess Who singles chronology
"Tossin' and Turnin'" (1965)	"Hey Ho, What You Do to Me" (1965)	"Hurting Each Other" (1966)

"Hey Ho, What You Do to Me" is a song written by Nickolas Ashford, Valerie Simpson, and Jo Armstead and performed by Chad Allan and the Expressions (Guess Who?). It reached #3 in Canada in 1965. The song was released in the United States in August of that same year and reached #125 on the Billboard chart. It was featured on their 1965 album, Hey Ho (What You Do to Me!)

Cash Box described it as a "rollicking, fast-moving, rhythmic high-spirited romancer about a guy who is on cloud nine ever since he met his girl."

The song was produced by Bob Burns and arranged by Chad Allan.
