= The Carpet Frogs =

Canadian rock band

- Origin: Toronto, Ontario, Canada
- Genres: Rock
- Years active: 1993–present
- Members: Nick Sinopoli; Gerry Finn; Jeff Jones; Michael Zweig; Sean Fitzsimons
- Past members: Greg Godovitz; Jim Nielsen; Mike Hall; Mike McDonald; Lawrence Grecchi; David Love
- Website: www.thecarpetfrogs.com

The Carpet Frogs are a Toronto-based rock band. They are known for their work performing at private events and touring with Randy Bachman and Burton Cummings and have performed on Canada's Walk of Fame, Juno Awards, Live 8 Canada, SOCAN Awards, and more.

== History ==
The Carpet Frogs performed as Burton Cummings' backup band on his 2008 album, Above the Ground. In 2016, the Carpet Frogs performed at the Juno Awards ceremony. In 2018, they performed with Cummings at a concert in Windsor.

In November 2025, Bachman and Cummings announced a reunion tour of the Guess Who to take place in 2026, utilizing some musicians from the Carpet Frogs as the remainder of the lineup.

== Personnel ==
=== Current members ===
- Nick Sinopoli - Percussion, vocals
- Jeff Jones - Bass guitar, vocals (Known for his work with Tom Cochrane and Red Rider, Ocean, Gowan and Infidels)
- Michael Zweig - Guitar, vocals
- Gerry Finn - Guitar, vocals
- Sean Fitzsimons - Drums, vocals

=== Past members ===
- Greg Godovitz (Goddo)
- David Love
- Jim Nielsen (Bass)
- Mike Hall (Killer dwarfs)
- Mike McDonald (Bayou Boys)
- Lawrence Grecchi (original member)
- Steve Jensen (original member)
- Tim Bovaconti (replaced Michael in Bachman Cummings band 2007)
- Leonardo Valvassori

== Discography ==
=== Albums ===
- 1994 – Frog Curry
- 1994 – Christmas All Over the World (4-song holiday set)
- 1995 – Adult Rock No. 5
- 1995 – Album Network In Store Play 34
- 2000 – Bullseye's Compact Christmas 2000
- 2001 – Takin' Care of Christmas
- 2003 – Everything is Beautiful
- 2006 – Pretending To Fly
- 2006 – Bachman Cummings, First Time Around DVD/cd sonybmg
- 2007 – Jukebox (Bachman Cummings Band)
- 2008 – Above The Ground, Burton Cummings, Sony/BMG
- 2012 – Massey Hall Burton Cummings Live .Universal Music Canada

=== DVD ===
- 2005 – Live 8 concert, Barrie
- 2006 – First Time Around Bachman Cummings DVD available
- 2008 – Above The Ground DVD -Burton Cummings disc
- 2010 – various Winter Olympic clips from Burton Cummings Feb 25th performance TV Show
