= Albert Flasher =

1971 single by The Guess Who

Single by the Guess Who
- A-side: "Broken"
- Released: March 1971
- Recorded: 1970
- Genre: Blues
- Length: 2:18
- Label: Nimbus (CAN); RCA Victor (US); RCA (UK)
- Songwriter: Burton Cummings
- Producer: Jack Richardson

The Guess Who singles chronology
"Hang on to Your Life" (1970)	"Albert Flasher" (1971)	"Rain Dance" (1971)

"Albert Flasher" is a song written by Burton Cummings and performed by Canadian rock band The Guess Who. Initially released as the B-side of their "Broken" single in 1971, it was promoted to A-side status in mid-May of that year, according to the Billboard Hot 100 chart. It did not appear on any of their studio albums at that time, although it would much later be included on reissues of the band's 1971 album So Long, Bannatyne (such as the Iconoclassic release in 2009). It would also appear on many of their later compilation albums, including the 1973 release The Best of The Guess Who Volume II and the 1973 compilation EP titled The Guess Who. It was also performed many times in concert, including the performance captured on Live at the Paramount (1972).

"Albert Flasher" reached No. 13 in Canada, No. 28 in Australia, and No. 29 on the Billboard Hot 100 in 1971. It was also released in the United Kingdom as a single, but did not chart.

The song was produced by Jack Richardson. The song's title came from Cummings seeing a button labeled "alert flasher" on a radio broadcast console. Cummings combined lyrics inspired by that phrase with a piano riff which he used to warm up with to make the finished song.

== In media ==
- "Albert Flasher" was heard in the movie Almost Famous, but was not included on the soundtrack album.
