= Glamour Boy =

Single by The Guess Who

from the album #10
- B-side: "Lie Down"
- Released: May 1973
- Recorded: 1973
- Genre: Rock
- Length: 5:27
- Label: RCA Victor
- Songwriter: Burton Cummings
- Producer: Jack Richardson

The Guess Who singles chronology
"Orly" (1973)	"Glamour Boy" (1973)	"Star Baby" (1974)

"Glamour Boy" is a song written by Burton Cummings and performed by The Guess Who, and was featured on their 1973 album, #10. The song was produced by Jack Richardson.

It was inspired by David Bowie and reached #14 in Canada in 1973. The song was also released in the United States as a single, peaking at #83 on the Cash Box Top 100.

== Background ==
Burton Cummings on "Glamour Boy" in 2016.

One of my all time favourites. It was originally inspired by David Bowie, and now that he's gone I can kinda do it as a tribute to his amazing career. I was very threatened ... I felt very threatened when David Bowie came along, because it all changed. Music took second or third place to the appearance, and then theatrics came into Rock n Roll...

== Popular culture ==
"Glamour Boy" was featured prominently in the 1998 Don McKellar film Last Night.
