= Sour Suite =

- Cover of the 1971 German single

Single by The Guess Who

from the album So Long, Bannatyne
- B-side: "Life in the Bloodstream"
- Released: October 1971 (CAN); November 1971 (US)
- Recorded: 1971 at RCA's Mid-America Recording Center, Chicago, Illinois
- Genre: Rock
- Length: 4:06
- Label: Nimbus Records 0578 (CAN); RCA Victor 0578 (US)
- Songwriter(s): Burton Cummings
- Producer(s): Jack Richardson

The Guess Who singles chronology
"Rain Dance" (1971)	"Sour Suite" (1971)	"Heartbroken Bopper" (1972)

"Sour Suite" is a song written by Burton Cummings and performed by The Guess Who. It reached #12 in Canada and #50 on the Billboard Hot 100 in 1972. The song was featured on their 1971 album, So Long, Bannatyne. Cummings said it took between two and three days to write the song. Its lyric about being "back in 46201" refers to a zip code for Indianapolis. Cummings took it from the return address of a letter sent to him by a female fan.

The song was produced by Jack Richardson.

The single's B-side, "Life in the Bloodstream", also charted, reaching #39 in Canada.
