= Rain Dance (song) =

Single by The Guess Who

from the album So Long, Bannatyne
- B-side: "One Divided"
- Released: July 1971
- Recorded: 1971
- Studio: RCA's Mid-America Recording Center, Chicago, Illinois
- Genre: Rock
- Length: 2:45
- Label: RCA Victor
- Songwriters: Burton Cummings, Kurt Winter
- Producer: Jack Richardson

The Guess Who singles chronology
"Albert Flasher" (1971)	"Rain Dance" (1971)	"Sour Suite" (1971)

"Rain Dance" is a song written by Burton Cummings and Kurt Winter and performed by The Guess Who. It was featured on their 1971 album, So Long, Bannatyne. The song was produced by Jack Richardson.

== Chart performance ==
"Rain Dance" reached #3 in Canada, #8 in New Zealand, #19 on the Billboard Hot 100, and #55 in Australia in 1971.

Chart (1988)	Peak position
Argentina (CAPIF)	9
