= Chad Allan =

Canadian musician (1943–2023)

Chad Allan OM
- Also known as: Allan Kobel
- Born: Allan Peter Stanley Kowbel; March 29, 1943; Winnipeg, Manitoba, Canada
- Died: November 21, 2023 (aged 80) Vancouver, British Columbia, Canada
- Genres: Rock, soft rock, country rock
- Occupations: Musician, singer-songwriter
- Instruments: Vocals, guitar, keyboards
- Years active: 1958–2017
- Labels: Canadian-American, Quality, Scepter, Birchmount, Reprise, GRT, Seabreeze, Regenerator
- Formerly of: The Guess Who, Brave Belt

Allan Peter Stanley Kowbel OM (March 29, 1943 – November 21, 2023), better known by his stage name Chad Allan, was a Canadian musician. He was the founding member and original lead singer of the Guess Who.

== Career ==
Allan's first band, Allan and the Silvertones, was formed while he was attending Miles MacDonell Collegiate in 1958. Then Allan brought noted Winnipeg musicians Bob Ashley, Jim Kale, Randy Bachman, and Garry Peterson into the band, which was now going by the name Chad Allan and the Reflections, with Allan taking his stage name from one of his favourite singers, Chad Mitchell of the Chad Mitchell Trio. They released their first two singles, "I Just Didn't Have the Heart" and "Tribute to Buddy Holly" on the Canadian-American label in 1962. In 1963, the band changed their name to Chad Allan and the Expressions after signing with Quality Records and releasing several singles that were minor hits in Canada.

== The Guess Who ==
In January 1965, Quality released the Chad Allan & the Expressions single "Shakin' All Over", a cover of the Johnny Kidd song. As a promo stunt to make listeners think the song might be by a British Invasion band, Quality sent promo copies of the single to radio stations with the artist simply identified as "Guess Who?". The stunt proved successful, as the single climbed to #1 in Canada and #22 in the US charts. Even after the band was revealed to be Chad Allan & the Expressions, many disc jockeys continued to call them Guess Who. This became the band's new name, although throughout 1965 they were being credited as Chad Allan & the Expressions (Guess Who?).

In December 1965, Bob Ashley left the band and Burton Cummings of The Deverons replaced him. When Cummings left The Deverons, he was replaced by Wayne Arnold keyboard player for The V I P'S. Shortly before Cummings' arrival, the band dropped the name Chad Allan & the Expressions and began incorporating harder R&B material into their sets and became The Guess Who.

In early 1966, Allan was starting to experience some voice challenges that made it difficult for him to sing. After the recording of the group's third album, It's Time, Allan left the band.

== After the Guess Who ==
Allan initially went back to college for a brief period of time, but continued performing. In 1967, he was chosen to host CBC Television's weekly music program Let's Go. Coincidentally, the house band chosen for the show was The Guess Who. The show lasted two seasons before being cancelled. Allan, still under contract to Quality Records (signed in 1963), released a number of singles. The first solo attempt by Allan after leaving The Guess Who was first issued as Looking Through Crystal Glass. In the summer of 1968, producer Bob McMillan began recording tracks with Allan, Karen Marklinger & Corrine Cyca for CBC Television's lineup of music shows. The trio sounded great together and he approached the Birchmount label to repackage the album under the group name The Metro-Gnomes. The album was reissued in late 1969.

In 1971, Allan reconnected with former Guess Who bandmate Randy Bachman to form Brave Belt. The band released two country-rock albums for Reprise Records. While Allan sang lead for most of the tracks on the first, self-titled Brave Belt album, the arrival of bassist/vocalist Fred Turner for Brave Belt II (1972) reduced Allan's involvement. He sang lead on only two of the album's 11 tracks. Shortly after the release of Brave Belt II, Allan left the band. In 1973, he released his second solo album, Sequel, on GRT Records of Canada. Allan was also chosen to play the lead character in a musical adaptation of the Old English poem Beowulf, which was released on album in 1974. Allan co-composed the theme song for the 1976 children programming called Let's Go unrelated TV series of the same title. In 1977, Allan moved to Vancouver, British Columbia. In 1978, he released a compilation album called Shakin' All Over - it was distributed by a Greek label named Seagull and made in that country.

Allan pursued many musical endeavours including gospel music, hosting a children's television show in Winnipeg, and forming his own record label, Seabreeze Records, from which he released several singles and an album that didn't fare well. For a number of years, starting in 1982, he taught songwriting at Kwantlen University College in Surrey, British Columbia. Allan appeared on a CBC special called It's Only Rock & Roll starring Ralph Benmergui, interviewing Neil Young, Burton Cummings, and Randy Bachman in a 1987 reunion in Winnipeg.

In 1992, Allan released a Christian rock album called Zoot Suit Monologue.

In January 2007, Regenerator Records issued a CD consisting of four rare studio tracks and a live concert recording c. 1962 entitled Chad Allan and the Reflections — Early Roots. A limited-edition double-vinyl LP set of the collection (minus the four studio cuts) was released in Spring 2008. Regenerator has also remastered Sequel and Zoot Suit, and they are available for download on iTunes.

In 2015, he was made a member of the Order of Manitoba "for his contributions to the Canadian music industry including the pivotal role he played in the creation of two legendary Winnipeg rock bands: The Guess Who and Bachman-Turner Overdrive."

On August 27, 2017, it was reported by the CBC that Allan had suffered a "serious stroke" four days earlier (August 23) and was recovering in a British Columbia hospital. Publicist Jamie Anstey told the CBC that the singer was "responding" and "We're really praying for him; we're really rooting for him to make it through this." He died on November 21, 2023, at the age of 80.

== Discography ==
=== Albums ===
Year	Album	Chart positions		CRIA
Year	Album	CAN	US	CRIA
1969	Looking Through Crystal Glass (with Karen Marklinger & Corrine Cyca)	—	—	—
1969	The Metro-Gnomes	—	—	—
1973	Sequel	—	—	—
1974	Beowulf: A Musical Epic	—	—	—
1978	Shakin' All Over	—	—	—
1992	Zoot Suit Monologue	—	—	—
2007	Chad Allan and the Reflections — Early Roots	—	—	—

=== Singles ===
Year	Single	Chart positions			Album
Year	Single	CAN AC	CAN	CAN Country	Album
1967	"Salt in My Wounds / Wrap Myself in Sunshine"	—	—	—	singles only
1968	"Greeting Card / Elevator"	—	—	—	singles only
1968	"Through the Looking Glass / Ramona's Hourglass"	—	—	—	singles only
1969	"Looking Through Crystal Glass / I'll Think of You Sometimes"	—	—	—	The Metro-Gnomes
1971	"West Coast Girl / On the Back Step"	14	—	—	single only
1973	"Spending My Time / Sixty Cents a Shot"	27	79	—	Sequel
1973	"Prairietown, Midwest City / Dunrobin's Gone"	—	—	71	Sequel
1974	"Try / I Sing the Song of Beginning"	—	—	—	Beowulf: A Musical Epic
1981	"Ballad of a Middle-Aged Rocker / Movie"	—	—	—	singles only
1982	"Don't Muscle Me, Baby / Sunny Monday"	—	—	—	singles only
