= Greg Leskiw =

Canadian guitarist (born 1947)

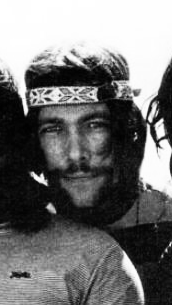
- Leskiw with The Guess Who in 1970

Background information
- Born: 5 August 1946 (age 79); Brandon, Manitoba, Canada
- Genres: Rock
- Occupation: Guitarist
- Years active: 1969-present

Gregory Leskiw (born 5 August 1946) is a Canadian guitarist and vocalist best known for playing rhythm guitar and singing background vocals on recordings and in concert with the Guess Who from 1970 to 1972.

== History ==
Born in Brandon, Manitoba and raised in Shilo, Leskiw grew up with a father who was a jazz guitarist and who had toured Manitoba in the 1930s and 1940s. Leskiw began playing the guitar at the age of 12, initially learning jazz standards and jazz chords from his father. Through Leskiw's high school years he played in Winnipeg rock bands The Shags, Logan Avenue, and Wild Rice. By 1969, Wild Rice dissolved, and in mid-1970 he joined The Guess Who, as he and guitarist Kurt Winter both replaced the departed Randy Bachman. Leskiw wrote "One Divided" which appeared on the 1971 Guess Who album So Long, Bannatyne. After a few albums with The Guess Who, Leskiw left the band in March 1972, and then formed the band Mood jga jga. In the late 1970s and early 1980s, he was a member of Crowcuss and Kilowatt, both with another Guess Who alumnus, bassist Bill Wallace. From 1986 to 1997, Leskiw operated Vox Pop Studios in Fort Garry, a popular recording studio for local Winnipeg groups such as Crash Test Dummies, New Meanies, and Mood jga jga.

== Discography ==
=== The Guess Who ===
- 1970: Share the Land
- 1971: Best of The Guess Who
- 1971: So Long, Bannatyne
- 1972: Rockin'
- 1974: The Best of the Guess Who, Vol. 2
- 1977: The Greatest Hits of the Guess Who
- 1997: The Guess Who: The Ultimate Collection
- 1999: The Guess Who: Greatest Hits
- 2003: Platinum & Gold Collection: The Guess Who
- 2003: The Guess Who: Anthology

=== Mood jga jga ===
- 1974: Mood jga jga (Warner Bros.)
- 1997: Boys Will Be Boys

=== Les Q ===
- 1979: Be My Champion (SL Records/CBS)

=== Kilowatt ===
- 1982: Kilowatt (Dallcorte Records)
- 1983: Currents

=== One Eyed Jacks ===
- 1993: Hell on Hold

=== Swing Soniq ===
- 1998: Moonglow
- 2005: Love Wild

== Sources ==
- The Guess Who Artistfacts
