= Kurt Winter =

Canadian musician (1946–1997)

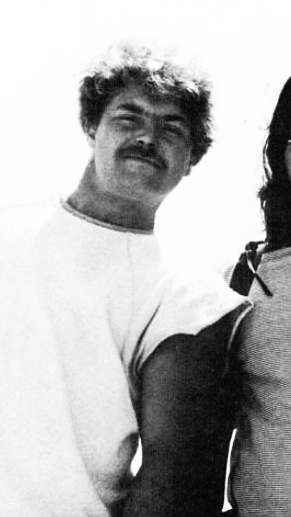
- Kurt Winter with The Guess Who in 1970

Background information
- Born: April 2, 1946
- Origin: Winnipeg, Manitoba, Canada
- Died: December 14, 1997 (aged 51)
- Genre: Rock
- Occupations: Guitarist, songwriter
- Instrument: Guitar
- Formerly of: Brother; The Guess Who

Kurt Frank Winter (April 2, 1946 – December 14, 1997) was a Canadian guitarist and songwriter, best known as a member of The Guess Who.

== Biography ==
Winter was born in Winnipeg, Manitoba. He attended Daniel McIntyre Collegiate Institute. From the mid-1960s he was a member of several local Winnipeg rock bands, collaborating at various times with bassist Bill Wallace and drummer Vance Schmidt (later known as Vance Masters). In 1969 Winter, Wallace, and Schmidt formed the band Brother, who were associates of The Guess Who. Brother was together for less than six months, but became known for the fact that all three members later joined The Guess Who.

Guitarist Randy Bachman left The Guess Who in 1970, and that's when the band's leader Burton Cummings recruited Winter and Greg Leskiw as Bachman's replacements. Winter was with The Guess Who for four years and became one of the band's primary songwriters in tandem with Cummings. After six studio albums, Winter left The Guess Who for undisclosed reasons in 1974, and was replaced by Domenic Troiano.

After The Guess Who broke up, various former members of that band attempted reunion tours with floating lineups. Winter briefly joined a lineup led by bassist Jim Kale in 1977–1978, and contributed to the album Guess Who's Back.

Winter then retired from the music industry and resided in Winnipeg for the rest of his life. Burton Cummings invited Winter to write songs for his 1990s solo albums, though Winter chose a life away from music. Winter suffered from health problems attributed to excessive alcohol use, and died at age 51 from kidney failure on December 14, 1997. His alma mater, Daniel McIntyre Collegiate Institute, initiated an annual scholarship in Winter's name in 1998. Cummings memorialized Winter in "Kurt's Song" on his 2008 album, Above the Ground. Cummings described Winter as "one of my fondest writing partners".

== Discography ==
With The Guess Who:

- 1970 Share the Land
- 1971 The Best of The Guess Who
- 1971 So Long, Bannatyne
- 1972 Rockin'
- 1972 Live at the Paramount
- 1973 Artificial Paradise
- 1973 #10
- 1973 The Best of The Guess Who Volume II
- 1974 Road Food
- 1978 Guess Who's Back
- 1988 Track Record: The Guess Who Collection
- 1997 The Guess Who: The Ultimate Collection
- 1999 The Guess Who: Greatest Hits
- 2003 Platinum & Gold Collection: The Guess Who
- 2006 Bachman Cummings Song Book
