= Jim Kale =

Canadian bassist (born 1943)

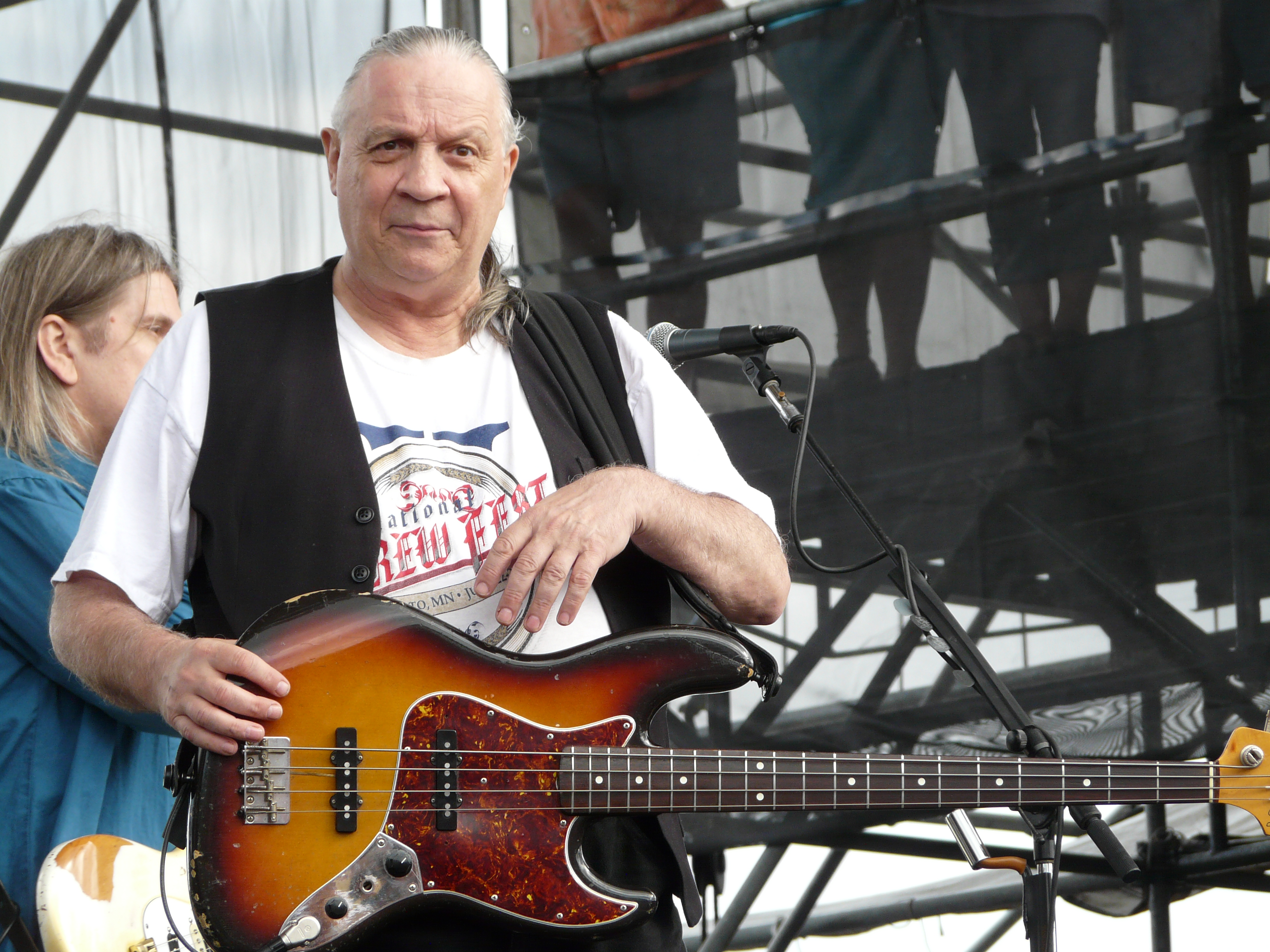
- Kale with his iteration of The Guess Who in 2008

Background information
- Born: Michael James Kale; August 11, 1943 (age 83); Winnipeg, Manitoba, Canada
- Origin: Hamilton, Ontario, Canada
- Genre: Rock
- Occupation: Bassist
- Years active: 1962–2016
- Formerly of: The Guess Who, Scrubbaloe Caine

Michael James Kale (born August 11, 1943) is a Canadian retired musician, best known as the original bassist for the rock band The Guess Who. He was also a member of the band Scrubbaloe Caine. In 1987, he was inducted into the Canadian Music Hall of Fame as a member of The Guess Who.

== Career ==
Michael James "Jim" Kale was born in Winnipeg. He described his father, who died in 1967 while the Guess Who were on tour in the UK, as abusive and an alcoholic. Kale joined the local Winnipeg band Chad Allan and the Reflections in 1962; that band later spun off into The Guess Who. Kale was the band's bassist during its most successful period up to 1972, appearing on several hit singles and albums and co-writing the band's best-known song, "American Woman", which reached no. 1 in Canada and the United States.

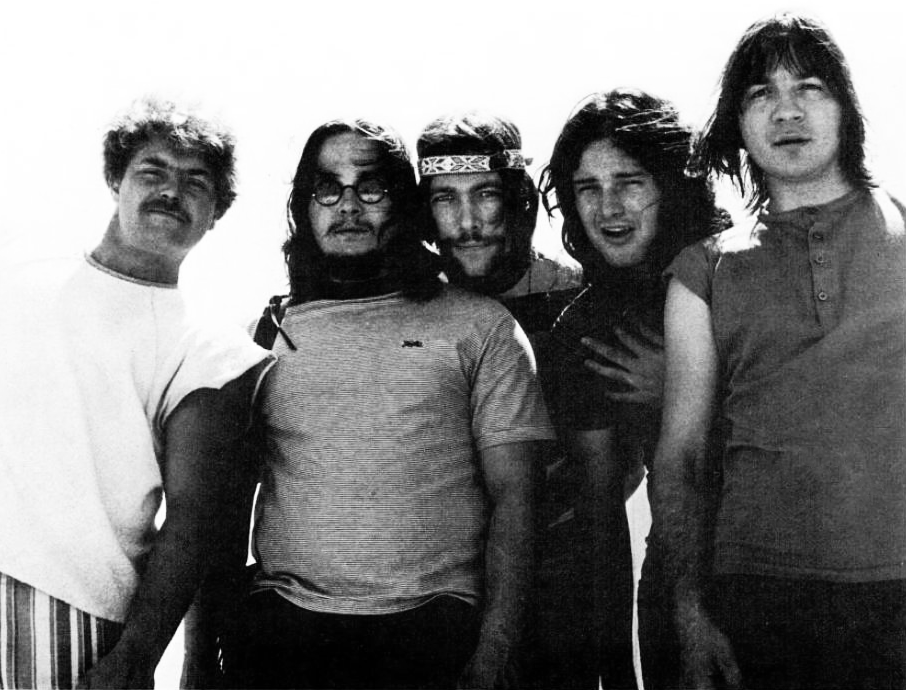
Kale (far right) with The Guess Who in 1970

Kale left The Guess Who in 1972 after the Live at the Paramount album, going on to join Scrubbaloe Caine. Scrubbaloe Caine was nominated for the 1974 Juno Award for Most Promising Group, losing to Bachman–Turner Overdrive featuring Kale's former bandmate Randy Bachman. Kale left Scrubbaloe Caine in late 1974 and subsequently formed and played with the Jim Kale Band/Jim Kale Show, followed by the Ripple Brothers.

Meanwhile, The Guess Who had broken up in 1975, and in 1977 the CBC invited former members to participate in a reunion concert. Bachman and lead vocalist Burton Cummings were not interested, but Kale asked them for permission to use the Guess Who name for the concert. While they allowed him to use the name for this purpose, Kale took this initial permission beyond what Bachman and Cummings had granted, and formed the first of many new line-ups of The Guess Who to record and tour the nostalgia circuit under the name, which Bachman and Cummings criticized over the years.

Kale registered the band name with the USPTO in 1986 after discovering that it had never been registered by the band previously, and thus became the sole owner of the band name legally. He led frequently-changing lineups of The Guess Who regularly, and released several new albums under that name which received little notice. He was sometimes joined by original Guess Who drummer Garry Peterson. Kale also participated in a reunion tour of the classic Guess Who line-up with Peterson, Cummings, and Bachman in 1983, and performed with them again at the closing ceremonies of the Pan-American Games in 1999. After a break from 2000 to 2004, when a Cummings/Bachman reunion line-up toured extensively, Kale revived his nostalgia tour version of the band until his retirement in 2016. While he chose bassist Rudy Sarzo as his replacement, Kale retained the rights to the band name, leasing it to various musicians performing as "The Guess Who" (sometimes including Peterson).

Both Cummings and Bachman were highly critical of Kale/Peterson's version of the Guess Who, calling it "the fake Guess Who", or "Kale's Klones" and calling the band's concerts "fake bullshit shows." Kale himself referred to his own potential iteration of the group as "a band of trained monkeys."

Early in 2023, Bachman and Cummings sent multiple cease-and-desist letters to the Peterson-led nostalgia band, accusing them of misleading the public. In October 2023, after having received no response to the letters, Bachman and Cummings launched a "false advertising" lawsuit against Kale and Peterson, claiming that the band has used the Guess Who name, photos of Bachman and Cummings, and original recordings, "to give the false impression that Plaintiffs are performing as part of the cover band." Bachman and Cummings sought $20 million in damages. A hearing pertaining to the lawsuit and Kale and Peterson's counterclaims was scheduled for January 2024. In April 2024, a federal judge denied Kale and Peterson's motion to dismiss the Bachman and Cummings suit.

In April 2024, Cummings arranged to have legal permission pulled for any public performance of any Guess Who material Cummings had written or co-written. This legal gambit left both the performer and the owner of the performance venue liable for damages if any Cummings-authored Guess Who songs were performed for an audience. Following this action, the band was unable to perform most of the group's biggest hits, including "These Eyes", "American Woman", "No Time", and "Share the Land", and many others. The group's concerts were immediately cancelled and the website for the Kale/Peterson-led Guess Who was shut down in July 2024, effectively bringing this iteration of the band to an end. In September 2024, Bachman and Cummings announced that they had gained control of the Guess Who name in an out-of-court settlement.
