= Burton Cummings =

Canadian musician (b. 1947)

Burton Cummings OC OM
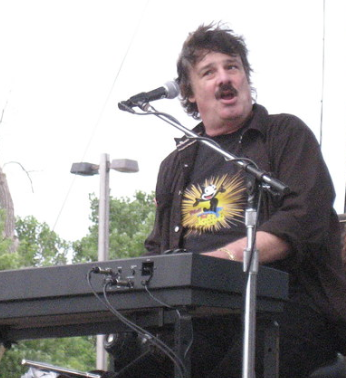
- Burton Cummings in 2011

Background information
- Born: Burton Lorne Cummings; December 31, 1947 (age 78); Winnipeg, Manitoba, Canada
- Genres: Rock; soft rock
- Occupations: Musician; singer; songwriter
- Instruments: Vocals; keyboards; guitar
- Years active: 1965–present
- Member of: The Guess Who
- Spouse: Cheryl DeLuca (m. 1981)
- Website: burtoncummings.com

Burton Lorne Cummings OC OM (born December 31, 1947) is a Canadian musician and songwriter. He led the Guess Who during the band's most successful period from 1965 to 1975, and has since had a lengthy solo career.

Cummings has been inducted into the Canadian Music Industry Hall of Fame and the Canadian Songwriters Hall of Fame, and has been cited as one of the most influential performers in Canadian rock music. He has also been named as an officer of the Order of Canada and Order of Manitoba. The Burton Cummings Theatre and Burton Cummings Community Centre in Winnipeg are named in his honour.

== Career ==
=== Early years ===
Cummings was born and raised in Winnipeg by his mother and maternal grandparents, after his father left the family during his infancy. He attended St. John's High School but dropped out at age 17 to pursue a career in music. The school granted him an honorary diploma in 2010.

In 1964 Cummings joined local R&B band the Deverons (not to be confused with an American group called the Devrons) on piano and vocals. The Deverons released two singles locally in Winnipeg. In early 1966, shortly after his 18th birthday, Cummings joined another regionally successful band, Chad Allan & The Expressions, to replace departed keyboardist Bob Ashley. Cummings also took on lead vocal duties in conjunction with group leader Chad Allan.

This group had been subjected to a record company publicity stunt in which their 1965 hit single "Shakin' All Over" was released anonymously with the message "Guess Who?" to trick listeners into thinking it was by a famous British Invasion band. Disc jockeys announced the single as being by someone called "Guess Who?", forcing the group to accept the nickname; their latest releases had been issued under the name Chad Allan & The Expressions with "Guess Who?" displayed prominently on the covers.

=== With the Guess Who ===
A few months after Cummings joined Chad Allan & the Expressions, Allan left his namesake band, leaving Cummings as the sole singer. The band's name was changed to simply the Guess Who, with Cummings becoming one of the band's primary songwriters in conjunction with guitarist Randy Bachman. Their first album under this name was It's Time in the summer of 1966.

The band became internationally successful upon the release of their album American Woman in 1970, which reached the top ten in several countries and made the Guess Who the first Canadian band to achieve a number one single in the United States. Bachman then left the Guess Who, and Cummings continued to lead the band through several more internationally successful albums. Cummings and drummer Garry Peterson were the only consistent members of the band during this era. Cummings disbanded the Guess Who in 1975 due to songwriting disagreements with guitarist Dominic Troiano.

=== Solo career ===
After the disbanding of The Guess Who, Cummings embarked on a solo career; his self-titled debut solo album was released in 1976 and reached the top ten on the Canadian albums chart. The single "Stand Tall" was an international hit and sold more than one million copies in the United States. In 1977, he was presented with a Juno Award as best male vocalist. Also in 1977, he provided backing vocals for the Eric Carmen album Boats Against the Current, and released his second solo album My Own Way to Rock.

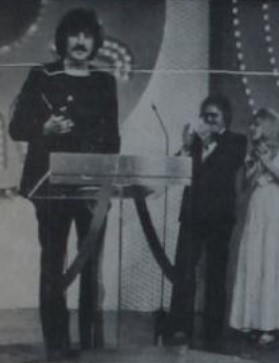
Burton Cummings accepting his Juno award for Male Vocalist of the Year. Stood behind him are Gordon Lightfoot and Liona Boyd

His 1978 album, Dream of a Child, sold more than 300,000 copies in Canada, making it one of the country's highest-selling albums up to that point. Due to a dispute with his record label, his 1980 album Woman Love was not released in the United States but was another substantial hit in Canada that earned Cummings another Juno Award. The 1981 album Sweet Sweet was much less successful. Cummings also dabbled in acting during this period, with an appearance in the film Melanie in 1982. Cummings joined a short reunion tour of the classic Guess Who lineup in 1983, which resulted in the live album Together Again! (known as The Best of The Guess Who - Live! in the United States). The solo albums Heart (1984) and Plus Signs (1990) were moderately successful in Canada.

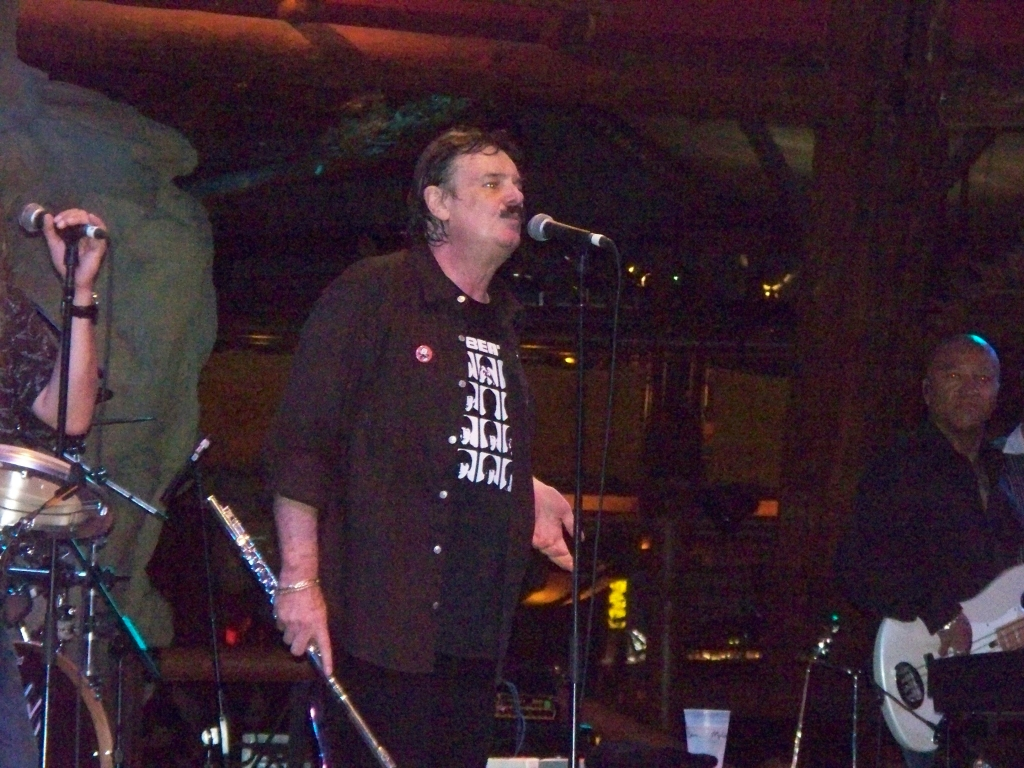
Cummings performing with his band at Mohegan Sun Casino in Connecticut, 2011

After an extended break from recording, Cummings released the live album Up Close and Alone in 1997, featuring songs from throughout his career performed on solo piano. Cummings then convened another reunion of The Guess Who for an extensive nostalgia tour from 2000 to 2003. In July 2003 the group performed before an estimated audience of 450,000 at the Molson Canadian Rocks for Toronto SARS benefit concert. The show was the largest outdoor ticketed event in Canadian history.

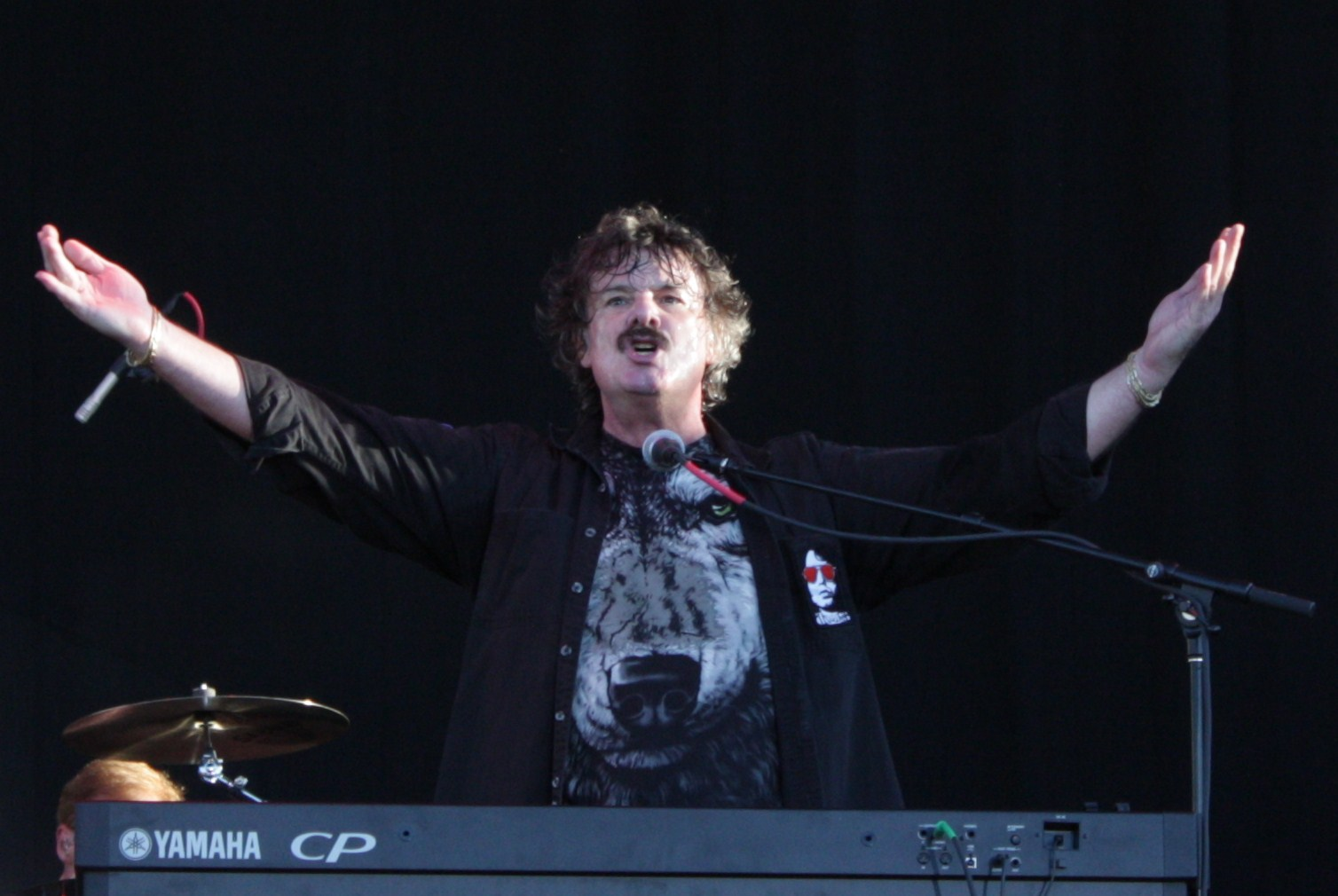
Cummings performing in Victoria, British Columbia, 2008

In 2004 Cummings released the one-off single "With God on Our Side", a Bob Dylan cover, which reached no. 29 on the Canadian singles chart. In 2006, Cummings and Randy Bachman started a new duo project backed by the Canadian rock band The Carpet Frogs, but were unable to use the name The Guess Who, which had been trademarked by bassist Jim Kale. The project became known as the Bachman-Cummings Band or simply Bachman-Cummings, and performs occasionally whenever both men are available. They released the covers album Jukebox in 2007 and most recently performed live in 2020. They have been selected to perform for a celebration of Manitoba's 150th anniversary, to take place after delays caused by the COVID-19 pandemic.

The Carpet Frogs have also served as Cummings's solo band. In 2008, Cummings released his first all-new solo album in 18 years, Above the Ground. In 2017 he released a book of poetry titled The Writings of B. L. Cummings. He returned to solo performances in 2019, with shows featuring cover songs and original songs from throughout his career with The Guess Who and as a solo artist. His latest album, A Few Good Moments, was released on September 26, 2024.

In 2025 Cummings announced his "A Few Good Moments" tour would perform at 22 locations in Canada and the United States, including Line Spike 2025 in Harrowsmith, Ontario.

== Awards ==
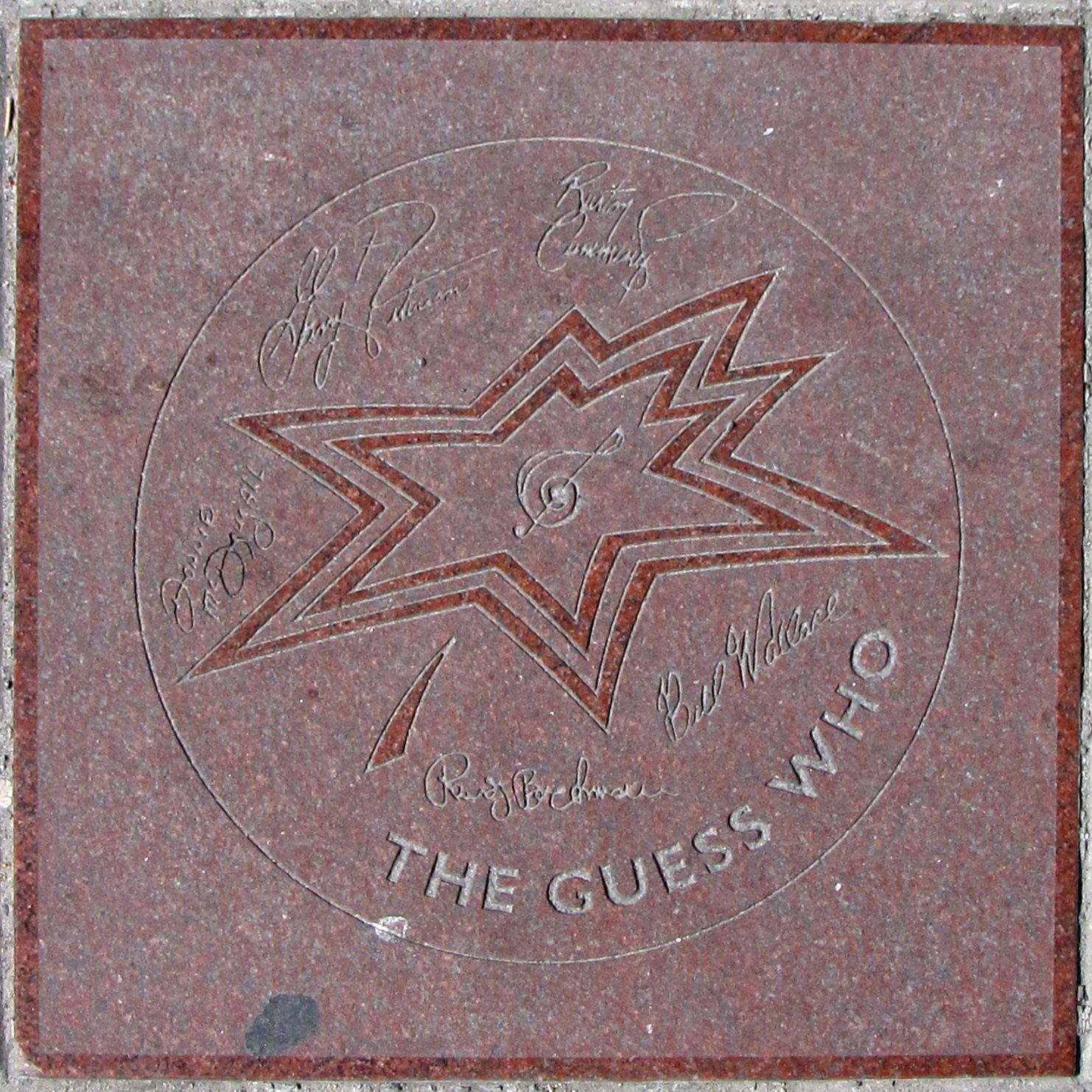
Star for Cummings and The Guess Who on Canada's Walk of Fame

Throughout his career, Cummings has won five RPM Awards, six Juno Awards, 22 SOCAN Awards, three BMI America Awards, and a Genie Award.

In 2001 Cummings and the rest of The Guess Who received honorary doctorates from Manitoba's Brandon University, which Cummings considered a singular honour as a high school dropout. That year Cummings also won three SOCAN Classic Awards.

On December 30, 2009, Cummings was named an officer of the Order of Canada by Governor General Michaëlle Jean, to mark a lifetime of outstanding achievement, dedication to community, and service to the nation. On June 28, 2011, Cummings was awarded with a star on Canada's Walk of Fame; he had previously received a star as a member of The Guess Who in 2001. He was inducted into the Canadian Music Hall of Fame in 2016, and received a SOCAN lifetime achievement award in 2018.

== Personal life ==
Cummings married Cheryl DeLuca on September 22, 1981. They separated in 2021. They had no children. He lived in Sherman Oaks, California, for many years until moving to Moose Jaw, Saskatchewan, in 2017. He is part owner of the Winnipeg-based restaurant chain Salisbury House. In May 2018 Cummings was involved in a serious car crash in Los Angeles that required physical and mental therapy and the cancellation of several weeks of performances.

== Discography ==
=== Albums ===
Year	Album	Chart positions			CRIA
Year	Album	CAN	AUS	US	CRIA
1976	Burton Cummings	5	32	30	2× Platinum
1977	My Own Way to Rock	4	83	51	2× Platinum
1978	Dream of a Child	11	—	203	3× Platinum
1980	Woman Love	4	—	—	Platinum
1980	The Best of Burton Cummings	—	—	—	2× Platinum
1981	Sweet Sweet	36	—	—	Gold
1984	Heart	89	—	—	—
1990	Plus Signs	43	—	—	Gold
1994	The Burton Cummings Collection	—	—	—	—
1996	Up Close and Alone	29	—	—	Platinum
2008	Above the Ground	16	—	—	—
2012	Massey Hall	—	—	—	—
2024	A Few Good Moments	—	—	—	—

=== Singles ===
Year	Single	Chart positions							Album
Year	Single	CAN AC	CAN	CAN Country	US	US AC	US Country	AU	Album
1976	"Stand Tall"	1	4	—	10	2	—	5	Burton Cummings
1977	"I'm Scared"	6	43	—	61	10	—	69	Burton Cummings
1977	"Timeless Love"	13	44	—	—	23	—	81	My Own Way to Rock
1977	"My Own Way to Rock"	—	38	—	74	—	—	—	My Own Way to Rock
1977	"Your Back Yard"	—	63	—	—	—	—	—	My Own Way to Rock
1978	"Break It to Them Gently"	1	9	—	85	—	—	—	Dream of a Child
1979	"I Will Play a Rhapsody"	3	20	—	—	38	—	—	Dream of a Child
1979	"Takes a Fool to Love a Fool"	—	—	19	—	—	33	—	Dream of a Child
1979	"Meanin' So Much"	14	75	—	—	—	—	—	Dream of a Child
1979	"Draggin' 'Em Down the Line (Live with Henry Small)"	33	85	—	—	—	—	—	single only
1980	"Fine State of Affairs"	30	10	—	—	—	—	—	Woman Love
1980	"One and Only"	48	78	—	—	—	—	—	Woman Love
1981	"You Saved My Soul"	12	31	—	37	22	—	47	Sweet Sweet
1982	"Mother Keep Your Daughters In"	24	—	—	—	—	—	—	Sweet Sweet
1982	"Something Old, Something New"	26	—	—	—	—	—	—	Sweet Sweet
1984	"Love Dream"	23	—	—	—	—	—	—	Heart
1985	"Whatever Happened to Your Eyes"	27	—	—	—	—	—	—	Heart
1990	"Take One Away"	6	16	—	—	—	—	—	Plus Signs
1990	"One Day Soon"	27	60	—	—	—	—	—	Plus Signs
1990	"The Rock's Steady"	—	97	—	—	—	—	—	Plus Signs
1990	"Free"	9	72	—	—	—	—	—	Plus Signs
2004	"With God on Our Side/The Brycer"	—	29	—	—	—	—	—	single only
2008	"We Just Came from the U.S.A."	—	—	—	—	—	—	—	Above the Ground
2008	"Dream"	—	—	—	—	—	—	—	Above the Ground
2019	"Market My Letters"	—	—	—	—	—	—	—	singles only
2019	"A Few Good Moments"	—	—	—	—	—	—	—	singles only
2019	"Sanity"	—	—	—	—	—	—	—	singles only

=== Film music ===
- California Dreaming (1978)
  - "Among the Yesterdays" (Music by Fred Karlin / Lyrics by Robb Royer)
  - "Keep it in the Family" (Music and Lyric by Cummings)
- Voices (1979)
  - "I Will Always Wait For You (Theme From Voices)" (Written by Jimmy Webb)
  - "On a Stage" (Written by Jimmy Webb)
  - "Drunk as a Punk" (Written by Jimmy Webb)
- Melanie (1982)
  - "You Saved My Soul" (Written by Cummings)
  - "Real Good" (Written by Cummings)
  - "Something Old, Something New" (Written by Cummings)

=== Collaborations with Randy Bachman ===
- 2006 Bachman Cummings Songbook – Compilation that features tracks from The Guess Who, Burton Cummings and Bachman–Turner Overdrive
- 2006 The Thunderbird Trax – A compilation of previously unreleased material recorded by Bachman and Cummings circa 1987
- 2007 Jukebox – Bachman & Cummings album that features covers of songs by artists such as Bob Dylan, The Shadows and The Beatles

== See also ==
- Music of Canada
  - Rock music of Canada
- Bruce Robb
