= Vinyl Tap =

Popular-music radio show on CBC and in syndication

Vinyl Tap was a Canadian radio show hosted by Randy Bachman, musician alumnus of the famous Canadian rock bands The Guess Who and Bachman–Turner Overdrive. The show ran on CBC Radio from 2005 until 2021, when it was cancelled. A syndicated version aired on commercial radio from 2022 to 2023. A shorter podcast version was also available featuring Bachman's anecdotes.

== CBC Radio show ==
In the two-hour program, Randy Bachman played predominantly classic rock, pop and older jazz music and told stories behind the selections, adding from time to time short musical demonstrations played live, besides frequent personal anecdotes. Musical selections were commonly organized around a theme, sometimes of Bachman's own choosing and sometimes in response to a request submitted by a listener. The program's format somewhat resembled Finkleman's 45s, the program it replaced in June 2005 on the CBC Radio schedule, although Bachman presented a very different range of musical selections than Danny Finkleman did. Some of Bachman's musical stories from the program were published in book form in the fall of 2011.

Until 2011, when they separated, Bachman's wife Denise McCann Bachman also participated in the show, reading listener mail (typically 40 minutes into the first hour), doing fact research and commenting. His son Tal Bachman took over the research for the show, but did not contribute as an on-air personality.

In 2010, Bachman hosted an episode of the show live from the Glenn Gould Studio at the CBC Broadcast Centre in Toronto, Ontario. Titled "Guitarology 101", the episode featured Bachman, McCann, Mick Dalla-Vee and Brent Knudsen talking about various aspects of guitars, including live performances of a number of classic rock and rhythm and blues songs.

When it was a CBC show, CBC Vancouver senior radio producer Tod Elvidge engineered, edited, and compiled each show for broadcast.

In 2021, the CBC announced the cancellation of the show. A farewell special aired on Canada Day, July 1, 2021.

== Syndicated version ==
In February 2022, it was announced that the show would be returning to the air weekly, Sundays at 9 PM in most markets, beginning March 6, 2022, as a syndicated programme on nearly a dozen Corus radio stations as well as several non-Corus stations. The revived show was co-produced by syndicator Orbyt Media and Corus Entertainment. Orbyt and Corus dropped the show in April 2023, with the final broadcast airing on April 30, 2023.

Forty-eight original episodes aired annually in syndication, up from the 36 original shows that had been produced annually for CBC. Unlike the CBC version of the show, the Corus production included commercials but otherwise had the same format and retained its two-hour running time.

Stations that aired the syndicated version of Vinyl Tap from 2022 to 2023 included:

- Q107 Toronto, Ontario
- CHOM 97.7 Montreal, Quebec
- Cool 106.3 Sarnia, Ontario
- Cool 95.1 Chatham-Wallaceburg, Ontario
- Cool 94.5 Wingham, Ontario
- Moose 100.1 Fort St. John, British Columbia
- Q97.9 New Glasgow, Nova Scotia
- Q103 Moncton, New Brunswick
- Q104 Halifax, Nova Scotia
- The Rock Q88.9 Saint John, New Brunswick
- Q107 Calgary, Alberta
- Big 96.3 Kingston, Ontario
- Rock 101 Vancouver, British Columbia
- FM96 London, Ontario
- Big 101.1 Barrie, Ontario
- 107.5 Dave Rocks Kitchener-Cambridge-Waterloo, Ontario
- Power 97 Winnipeg, Manitoba
- Boom 101.9 Cornwall, Ontario
- Y108 Hamilton, Ontario
- The Chuck 92.5 Edmonton, Alberta
- 101.5 The Wolf Peterborough, Ontario
