= Dartmouth—Cole Harbour =

Federal electoral district in Nova Scotia, Canada

Nova Scotia electoral district
- Interactive map of riding boundaries from the 2025 federal election

Federal electoral district
- Legislature: House of Commons
MP
Darren Fisher
Liberal
- District created: 1966
- First contested: 1968
- Last contested: 2025
- District webpage: profile, map

Demographics
- Population (2021): 96,165
- Electors (2025): 83,157
- Area (km²): 89.99
- Pop. density (per km²): 1,068.6
- Census division: Halifax
- Census subdivision(s): Halifax (part), Cole Harbour

Dartmouth—Cole Harbour (formerly Dartmouth and Dartmouth—Halifax East) is a federal electoral district in Nova Scotia, Canada, that has been represented in the House of Commons of Canada since 2004.

== Demographics ==
Historical population
Year	Pop.	±%
2001	87,588	—
2006	87,886	+0.3%
2011 (2003 redist.)	89,163	+1.5%
2011 (2015 redist.)	91,212	+2.3%
2016	92,301	+1.2%
2021	96,165	+4.2%

According to the 2021 Canadian census, 2023 representation order

Languages: 90.5% English, 3.8% French, 1.0% Punjabi
Race: 82.4% White, 4.3% Indigenous, 5.5% Black, 3.0% South Asian, 1.2% Filipino
Religions: 55.8% Christian (25.5% Catholic, 8.8% Anglican, 6.9% United Church, 4.2% Baptist, 10.4% other), 1.2% Muslim, 1.1% Sikh, 39.7% none
Median income: $42,400 (2020)
Average income: $50,560 (2020)

== Geography ==
The district includes the urban communities of Dartmouth and Cole Harbour in Halifax. The area is 89.99 km^{2} (34.75 sq mi).

== Political geography ==
The Liberals and the NDP were the two main parties in 2008. The NDP saw much of its support in West Dartmouth, around Topsail Lake, the northern part of Cole Harbour, and the communities of Imperoyal and Woodside as well as the Cole Harbour 30 Indian Reserve. The Conservatives won two polls, both in Cole Harbour. The Liberals dominated in Central, Eastern and Northern Dartmouth and in southern Cole Harbour.

== History ==
The riding of Dartmouth—Halifax East was created in 1966 when the former dual-member Halifax riding was split into two. The district consisted of the Dartmouth area, Bedford and most of eastern Halifax County. Bedford was moved to the riding of Halifax West in a 1976 redistribution. In 1987, the Dartmouth riding was created, taking in nearly all of the former territory of Dartmouth—Halifax East.

The electoral district of Dartmouth—Cole Harbour in 2004 was created from 86.8% of the population of the new riding came from Dartmouth, and 13.2% from Sackville—Musquodoboit Valley—Eastern Shore.

The 2012 federal electoral redistribution concluded that this riding will remain largely the same for the 42nd Canadian federal election. It lost a small fraction to the new riding of Sackville—Preston—Chezzetcook and gained a small portion (2%) from what was Sackville—Eastern Shore.

Following the 2022 Canadian federal electoral redistribution, the riding gained the Eastern Passage area from Sackville—Preston—Chezzetcook, and lost all of the area north of Highways 111 and 118 plus the Lake Charles area to Sackville—Bedford—Preston.

=== Member of Parliament ===
These ridings have elected the following members of Parliament:

Parliament	Years	Member	Party
Dartmouth—Halifax East; Riding created from Halifax
28th	1968–1972	Michael Forrestall	Progressive Conservative
29th	1972–1974	Michael Forrestall	Progressive Conservative
30th	1974–1979	Michael Forrestall	Progressive Conservative
31st	1979–1980	Michael Forrestall	Progressive Conservative
32nd	1980–1984	Michael Forrestall	Progressive Conservative
33rd	1984–1988	Michael Forrestall	Progressive Conservative
Dartmouth
34th	1988–1993	Ron MacDonald	Liberal
35th	1993–1997	Ron MacDonald	Liberal
36th	1997–2000	Wendy Lill	New Democratic
37th	2000–2004	Wendy Lill	New Democratic
Dartmouth—Cole Harbour
38th	2004–2006	Michael Savage	Liberal
39th	2006–2008	Michael Savage	Liberal
40th	2008–2011	Michael Savage	Liberal
41st	2011–2015	Robert Chisholm	New Democratic
42nd	2015–2019	Darren Fisher	Liberal
43rd	2019–2021	Darren Fisher	Liberal
44th	2021–2025	Darren Fisher	Liberal
45th	2025–present	Darren Fisher	Liberal

== Election results ==
=== Dartmouth—Cole Harbour ===
==== 2025 ====
2025 Canadian federal election
Party	Candidate	Votes	%	±%	Expenditures
Liberal	Darren Fisher	40,367	67.69	+16.19	
Conservative	Isabelle Obeid	13,557	22.73	+19.86	
New Democratic	Keith Morrison	4,201	7.04	-25.93	
People's	Michelle Lindsay	750	1.26	-8.49	
Green	Rana Zaman	628	1.05	-1.86	
Libertarian	Joseph Shea	131	0.22	N/A	
Total valid votes/expense limit		59,634	99.49	+1.2	129,625.65
Total rejected ballots		305	0.51	-1.2	
Turnout		59,939	71.50	+10.3	
Eligible voters		83,825			
Liberal hold		Swing		-1.84	
Source: Elections Canada
Note: number of eligible voters does not include voting day registrations.

==== 2021 ====
2021 federal election redistributed results
Party	Vote	%
Liberal	25,823	51.50
New Democratic	16,529	32.97
People's	4,887	9.75
Green	1,457	2.91
Conservative	1,441	2.87

2021 Canadian federal election
Party	Candidate	Votes	%	±%	Expenditures
Liberal	Darren Fisher	24,209	53.06	+7.71	$57,490.92
New Democratic	Kevin Payne	15,267	33.46	+6.48	$22,178.20
People's	Michelle Lindsay	4,781	10.48	+8.82	$17,988.11
Green	Rana Zaman	1,371	3.00	-6.86	$2,272.30
Total valid votes/expense limit		45,628	98.29		$109,028.39
Total rejected ballots		796	1.71	+0.97	
Turnout		46,424	61.17	-8.48	
Eligible voters		75,898			
Liberal hold		Swing		+0.62	
Source: Elections Canada

Note that the Conservatives did not run a candidate in Dartmouth—Cole Harbour in the 2021 election, as their nominee withdrew shortly before the registration deadline.

==== 2019 ====
2019 Canadian federal election
Party	Candidate	Votes	%	±%	Expenditures
Liberal	Darren Fisher	24,259	45.34	-11.89	$67,276.38
New Democratic	Emma Norton	14,435	26.98	+2.57	$39,533.04
Conservative	Jason Cole	8,638	16.15	+2.12	$41,695.00
Green	Lil MacPherson	5,280	9.87	+6.47	none listed
People's	Michelle Lindsay	887	1.66		$2,485.00
Total valid votes/expense limit		53,499	99.25	–	$104,062.96
Total rejected ballots		404	0.75		
Turnout		53,903	69.65		
Eligible voters		77,390			
Liberal hold		Swing		-7.26	
Source: Elections Canada

==== 2015 ====
2015 Canadian federal election
Party	Candidate	Votes	%	±%	Expenditures
Liberal	Darren Fisher	30,407	58.17	+23.45	$64,958.30
New Democratic	Robert Chisholm	12,757	24.41	–12.02	$137,358.97
Conservative	Jason Cole	7,331	14.03	–11.00	$52,263.31
Green	Brynn Nheiley	1,775	3.40	–0.43	$723.31
Total valid votes/expense limit		52,270	99.62		$205,945.13
Total rejected ballots		201	0.38		
Turnout		52,471	71.81		
Eligible voters		73,066			
Liberal gain from New Democratic		Swing		+17.73	
Source: Elections Canada

2011 federal election redistributed results
Party	Vote	%
New Democratic	16,026	36.42
Liberal	15,278	34.72
Conservative	11,011	25.03
Green	1,684	3.83

==== 2011 ====
2011 Canadian federal election
Party	Candidate	Votes	%	±%	Expenditures
New Democratic	Robert Chisholm	15,678	36.27	+4.73	$51,111.67
Liberal	Mike Savage	15,181	35.12	-4.37	$70,147.67
Conservative	Wanda Webber	10,702	24.76	+2.30	$51,126.57
Green	Paul Shreenan	1,662	3.85	-2.11	$0.00
Total valid votes/expense limit		43,223	99.41		$83,954.73
Total rejected, unmarked and declined ballots		255	0.59	-0.01	
Turnout		43,478	61.45	+2.72	
Eligible voters		70,756			
New Democratic gain from Liberal		Swing		+4.55	

==== 2008 ====
2008 Canadian federal election
Party	Candidate	Votes	%	±%	Expenditures
Liberal	Mike Savage	16,016	39.49	-2.83	$63,901.48
New Democratic	Brad Pye	12,793	31.55	-0.95	$56,900.80
Conservative	Wanda Webber	9,109	22.46	-0.36	$64,746.58
Green	Paul Shreenan	2,417	5.96	+3.69	$444.09
Christian Heritage	George Campbell	219	0.54	–	$351.78
Total valid votes/expense limit		40,554	100.0		$80,942
Total rejected, unmarked and declined ballots		245	0.60	+0.23	
Turnout		40,799	58.73	-3.71	
Eligible voters		69,469			
Liberal hold		Swing		-0.94	

==== 2006 ====
2006 Canadian federal election
Party	Candidate	Votes	%	±%	Expenditures
Liberal	Mike Savage	19,027	42.32	+0.25	$67,910.96
New Democratic	Peter Mancini	14,612	32.50	±0	$60,717.57
Conservative	Robert A. Campbell	10,259	22.82	+1.72	$41,775.58
Green	Elizabeth Perry	1,005	2.24	-0.92	$582.70
Marxist–Leninist	Charles Spurr	56	0.12	-0.05	none listed
Total valid votes/expense limit		44,959	100.0		$76,265
Total rejected, unmarked and declined ballots		166	0.37	-0.07	
Turnout		45,125	62.44	+0.51	
Eligible voters		72,264			
Liberal hold		Swing		+0.12	

==== 2004 ====
2004 Canadian federal election
Party	Candidate	Votes	%	±%	Expenditures
Liberal	Mike Savage	17,425	42.07	+8.18	$62,046.28
New Democratic	Susan MacAlpine-Gillis	13,463	32.50	-2.82	$59,335.19
Conservative	Michael L. MacDonald	8,739	21.10	-9.34	$54,707.19
Green	Michael Marshall	1,311	3.16	–	$200.00
Progressive Canadian	Tracy Parsons	415	1.00	–	$1,140.15
Marxist–Leninist	Charles Spurr	70	0.17	–	none listed
Total valid votes/expense limit		41,423	100.0		$73,009
Total rejected, unmarked and declined ballots		181	0.44		
Turnout		41,604	61.93		
Eligible voters		67,176			
Liberal notional gain from New Democratic		Swing		+5.50	
Changes from 2000 are based on redistributed results. Conservative Party change is based on the combination of Canadian Alliance and Progressive Conservative Party totals.

2000 federal election redistributed results
Party	Vote	%
New Democratic	13,805	35.32
Liberal	13,246	33.89
Progressive Conservative	8,413	21.52
Alliance	3,488	8.92
Others	135	0.35

=== Dartmouth ===
==== 2000 ====
2000 Canadian federal election
Party	Candidate	Votes	%	±%
New Democratic	Wendy Lill	13,585	36.28	+3.71
Liberal	Bernie Boudreau	12,408	33.14	+5.93
Progressive Conservative	Tom McInnis	8,085	21.59	-5.32
Alliance	Jordi Morgan	3,282	8.76	-2.99
Marxist–Leninist	Charles Spurr	86	0.23	
Total valid votes		37,446	100.00	
Change for the Canadian Alliance from 1997 are based on the results of its predecessor, the Reform Party.

==== 1997 ====
1997 Canadian federal election
Party	Candidate	Votes	%	±%
New Democratic	Wendy Lill	12,326	32.57	+25.48
Liberal	Mike Savage	10,298	27.21	-23.60
Progressive Conservative	Rob McCleave	10,183	26.91	+3.33
Reform	John Cody	4,446	11.75	-3.87
Independent	Cliff Williams	438	1.16	-0.63
Natural Law	Claude Viau	156	0.41	-0.71
Total valid votes		37,847	100.00	
Change for Independent candidate Cliff Williams is shown based on his results as a National Party candidate in 1993.

==== 1993 ====
1993 Canadian federal election
Party	Candidate	Votes	%	±%
Liberal	Ron MacDonald	23,368	50.81	+4.62
Progressive Conservative	Judith Gass	10,843	23.58	-18.20
Reform	Orest Ulan	7,182	15.62	
New Democratic	Marty Zelenietz	3,261	7.09	-3.77
National	Cliff Williams	823	1.79	
Natural Law	Claude Viau	515	1.12	
Total valid votes		45,992	100.00	

==== 1988 ====
1988 Canadian federal election
Party	Candidate	Votes	%	±%
Liberal	Ron MacDonald	21,958	46.19	+20.09
Progressive Conservative	Michael Forrestall	19,863	41.78	-13.17
New Democratic	Marty Zelenietz	5,162	10.86	-8.09
Libertarian	Stanley Hodder	447	0.94	
Independent	Charles Spurr	109	0.23	
Total valid votes		47,539	100.00	

=== Dartmouth—Halifax East ===
==== 1984 ====
1984 Canadian federal election
Party	Candidate	Votes	%	±%
Progressive Conservative	Michael Forrestall	27,549	54.95	+13.10
Liberal	Rae Austin	13,084	26.10	-11.63
New Democratic	Ken Hale	9,503	18.95	-1.46
Total valid votes		50,136	100.00	

==== 1980 ====
1980 Canadian federal election
Party	Candidate	Votes	%	±%
Progressive Conservative	Michael Forrestall	17,968	41.85	-6.87
Liberal	Rae Austin	16,200	37.73	+2.62
New Democratic	Nelson Reed	8,764	20.41	+4.24
Total valid votes		42,932	100.00	
lop.parl.ca

==== 1979 ====
1979 Canadian federal election
Party	Candidate	Votes	%	±%
Progressive Conservative	Michael Forrestall	21,441	48.72	-2.74
Liberal	John Savage	15,453	35.11	-5.53
New Democratic	Frederick Turley	7,116	16.17	+9.00
Total valid votes		44,010	100.00	

==== 1974 ====
1974 Canadian federal election
Party	Candidate	Votes	%	±%
Progressive Conservative	Michael Forrestall	22,090	51.46	-6.02
Liberal	Arnold Patterson	17,444	40.64	+8.93
New Democratic	Alfred Nieforth	3,076	7.17	-3.03
Social Credit	Anthony Morbee	181	0.42	-0.19
Marxist–Leninist	Mike Malloch	135	0.31	
Total valid votes		42,926	100.00	

==== 1972 ====
1972 Canadian federal election
Party	Candidate	Votes	%	±%
Progressive Conservative	Michael Forrestall	24,553	57.48	+2.31
Liberal	John Savage	13,543	31.71	-8.71
New Democratic	Norman Dares	4,358	10.20	+5.80
Social Credit	Brian Pitcairn	261	0.61	
Total valid votes		42,715	100.00	

==== 1968 ====
1968 Canadian federal election
Party	Candidate	Votes	%
Progressive Conservative	Michael Forrestall	19,694	55.17
Liberal	Arnie Patterson	14, 429	40.42
New Democratic	Edward Newell	1,572	4.40
Total valid votes		35,695	100.00

== See also ==
- List of Canadian electoral districts
- Historical federal electoral districts of Canada
