= Live at the Roseland Ballroom, NYC =

Live At Roseland Ballroom, NYC

Live album by Bachman & Turner
- Released: May 29, 2012
- Genre: Blues rock, rock
- Length: 90:00 minutes
- Label: Eagle Rock Entertainment

Bachman & Turner chronology
Forged In Rock (2010)	Live At Roseland Ballroom, NYC (2012)

Live at the Roseland Ballroom is the first live album from Bachman & Turner. It was released on May 29, 2012 worldwide through Eagle Rock Entertainment, and was released as a two-disc set, DVD and digital format.

This album contains mostly songs from Randy Bachman and Fred Turner's work in the band Bachman–Turner Overdrive. Paul Shaffer makes a guest appearance on the songs "Shakin' All Over", "Roll On Down The Highway" and "Takin' Care of Business".

== Background ==
Asked in Goldmine about the making of the album, Bachman explained: "When we got asked to do a 3-D shoot for PBS, and then we could use the rights for our own DVD and Blu-ray, we thought this was a golden opportunity. So there was a place in Chicago that was chosen and/or the Roseland in New York. And because we were not one of their big shoots, we were put on hold, so we had to wait until these other acts either agreed to play Chicago or New York, and then the truck with all of the equipment [would be there] shooting 3-D material for PBS. As it happened, there were two days off at Roseland in New York, so we took them."

== Reception ==
Following its release, the album has been met with mostly positive reception from critics. Allmusic's Bret Adams gave the album three and a half stars out of a possible five, complimenting Fred Turner's performance by saying "Turner's songwriting and nimble bass guitar work provide a groovy foundation, but his greatest strength is his voice. His ragged rumble is truly a voice built for rock & roll, and it hasn't lost any power over the decades". Bob Ruggiero of Houston Press wrote that the band, which included Marc LaFrance, Brent Howard Knudsen, and Mick Dalla-Vee along with Bachman and Turner – plus Paul Shaffer on three tracks - "blast[s] with surprising power and strength through all the hits."

== Track listing ==
1. "Let It Ride "
2. "Rock Is My Life"
3. "Not Fragile"
4. "Hey You"
5. "Hold Back the Water"
6. "Waiting Game"
7. "Moonlight Rider"
8. "Looking Out For #1"
9. "Stayed Awake All Night"
10. "American Woman"
11. "Four Wheel Drive"
12. "Slave to the Rhythm"
13. "Blue Collar"
14. "That's What It Is"
15. "Sledgehammer"
16. "Rollin' Along"
17. "You Ain't Seen Nothing Yet"
18. "Shakin' All Over"
19. "Roll On Down the Highway"
20. "Takin' Care of Business"

== Personnel ==
- Randy Bachman – Composer, Guitar, Vocals, Producer
- Fred Turner – Composer, Bass Guitar, Vocals
- Mick Dalla-Vee – Guitar, Background Vocals
- Brent Knudson – Guitar, Background Vocals
- Marc LaFrance – Drums, Background Vocals
- Paul Shaffer - Piano on "Shakin' All Over", "Roll On Down the Highway" and "Takin' Care of Business"
