= CJMO-FM =

Radio station in Moncton, New Brunswick

Coordinates: 45°50′55″N 64°47′15″W

- Moncton, New Brunswick; Canada
- Broadcast area: Greater Moncton
- Frequency: 103.1 MHz
- Branding: Q103

Programming
- Format: Classic/Active rock

Ownership
- Owner: Stingray Group
- Sister stations: CJXL-FM

History
- First air date: June 19, 1987
- Call sign meaning: MO for Moncton

Technical information
- Class: C
- ERP: 46,800 watts
- HAAT: 254 metres (833 ft)

Links
- Website: q103fm.com

CJMO-FM is a Canadian FM radio station broadcasting at 103.1 MHz in Moncton, New Brunswick. The station airs a classic/active rock format branded as Q103. CJMO's studios are located on Arsenault Court, in the Moncton Industrial Park while its transmitter is located on Caledonia Mountain. The station is owned by the Stingray Group which also owns sister station CJXL-FM.

== History ==
On August 5, 1986, J.R. Gordon, representing a company to be incorporated (would be known as Atlantic Stereo Ltd.) was given approval to operate a new FM station at Moncton. The new facility would broadcast on a frequency of 103.1 MHz and have an effective radiated power of 46,800 watts. The format would be album-oriented rock (Group II harder pop and rock) aimed at the 18 to 34 age group. Competing applications by Radio One Ltd. (CIHI-AM Fredericton) and Radio-Aboiteux Ltee (the former CHLR-AM Moncton) were denied.

CJMO-FM was owned by a group of Moncton businessmen, headed by Rick Gordon, then an 18-year veteran of broadcasting. The studio building, in a new facility on Arsenault Court in the Moncton Industrial Park, provided 8,400 square feet of space on two floors. In addition to being owner, Rick Gordon was also general manager. He named Michael Leaman, engineering director and Larry McCaw, program director. Paul Wiggins was brought in from Vancouver's CFMI-FM (Rock 101) as music director, Assistant Program Director and Promotion & Marketing Director, a position he held from March 1987 to October 1988. Prior to Rock 103, Paul Wiggins was CFMI's programming innovator for Discumentary, a one-hour musical documentary of programming featuring a particular artist or a particular theme, which was syndicated throughout Canada, and broadcast internationally on the Anik D satellite.

The station started test transmissions at its frequency of 103.1 MHz at the beginning of 1987, by which it played non-stop album tracks. The first song played on the official launch at 1:03 p.m. on June 19, 1987, was April Wine's "I Like to Rock".

On air and in print branded as Rock 103 FM, CJMO signed on with an album-oriented rock format, which was a first for New Brunswick. In Halifax, CFRQ-FM was the only station in the Canadian Maritimes which had a similar format (AOR). Noteworthy, within its first six months on the air, CJMO was nominated as Medium Market FM Station of the Year at the annual Canadian Music Week. Some of the original on-air personality: Al Roberts from CKTS in Sherbrooke was morning host; Tom Brown was Midday, Cheryl (Erma) Appleby from CHUM owned CJYQ in St. John’s Newfoundland (also CIHI, K-100, CFNB) was Afternoon Drive. Kevin Clements was Evenings (Also CKCW, CIHI Fredericton, CJSS Cornwall, CHRO-TV (Announce/Producer/Director), Gerry Proctor was news director; and Marty Kingston (from CKEY Toronto and formerly of CKCW/CFQM) was sports director. Later, John Pearce (CHNS Halifax), Robin Sauve (CJCH Halifax and CHAM Hamilton) and Eric Stafford (CIHI Fredericton) joined CJMO. Eric Stafford came on board in 1988 as program director and temporary drive host. Mitch (1988–2007) debuted as evening host in January 1988. Former CFQM-FM afternoon drive (1979–1981) and Q-104 on-air personality Jim Armstrong was morning drive host from 1989 to 1990.

The "Rock 103" identification gradually segued to C103 within three years. With it came a more lite rock and classic rock format. In 2013, CJMO dropped the word "Classic" from its slogan and shifted its format to reflect mainstream rock as "Moncton's Rock Station, C103".

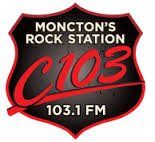
Former logo as "C103"

In 1990, NewCap Broadcasting bought 40% of Atlantic Stereo Ltd. NewCap executive vice president Jim Macleod said the partnership would open new opportunities for staff and a program exchange between CJMO and NewCap's CFRQ-FM.

In 1997, NewCap Broadcasting (currently doing business as Newcap Radio) purchased control in Atlantic Stereo Ltd.

On August 24, 2000, the CRTC awarded a licence to operate a sister station on 96.9 MHz, with an effective radiated power of 100,000 watts. CJXL-FM signed on the air in 2001.

Since 2018, the station has aired The Rock of the Atlantic, an evening show from CFRQ-FM in Halifax that airs across Stingray's rock stations in Atlantic Canada. On January 15, 2021, Stingray announced that the station, along with Saint John's CHNI-FM, and New Glasgow, Nova Scotia's CKEZ-FM, would form a regional network with CFRQ known as the "Q Network". The three stations all adopted branding modelled after CFRQ if they had not used the "Q" name already (with CJMO thus becoming Q103), and all three stations dropped their local morning shows in favour of CFRQ's BJ & The Q Morning Crew.

== Notable Hosts ==
- Alfred (AJ) Reynolds (Evening Announcer, early 2000s)

== See also ==
- Media in Moncton
