= Finkleman =

Finkleman is a surname. Notable people with the name include:

- Danny Finkleman, Canadian journalist and radio host
- Ken Finkleman, Canadian writer, producer, director, actor, and novelist
