= Finkleman's 45s =

Finkleman's 45s was a Canadian radio show, which aired Saturday evenings from 8:00 to 10:00 p.m. (half an hour later in Newfoundland) on CBC Radio One starting on October 5, 1985 and running until June 25, 2005. In the show Danny Finkleman played popular songs from the 1950s, 1960s and early 1970s, and talked about anything he felt like. For example, a regular component of the show was his advocation of a new business idea of his that he had observed a need for. Finkleman provided over 1,000 of his own unique business product and service ideas that he would rationalise and encourage listeners to adopt and develop as their own. Also, from 1985 to 1994, a regular guest on his show was musician and music expert Jack Schechtman. Danny called him, "The Dean of the Obscure". He and Danny would engage in friendly banter about the state of the Music Business (see below) with Jack defending the quality of music writing "Post Beatles and Motown". He would also play obscure songs from his personal 45's collection, from Doo Wop to Singer Songwriters, for Danny to either praise or pan.

The show was noted for Finkleman's rants about the modern world, including topics such as modern music and computers. Finkleman was generally opposed to both. In general the show was quite informal. The show's playlist was noted for its fairly wide selection of music from the period. Danny often played less popular songs than commercial "oldies" shows were able to. Favourite groups included the Shirelles, the Diamonds, Patti LaBelle, the Four Preps, the Box Tops, Gladys Knight & the Pips, Georgie Fame and the True Blues, The Crew-Cuts, Paul Anka, Otis Redding and Dusty Springfield.

Finkleman disliked the Rolling Stones and partly blamed them for the decline of music in the 1970s. One of Finkleman's central ideas was that the politicization of music in the mid-1970s ruined music, making it "mean spirited", "pretentious" and "ugly". According to Finkleman, the show's title was loosely based on the name of Gilmour's Albums, a popular variety show on CBC at the time Finkleman's show was conceived.

Finkleman retired from CBC radio in June, 2005 and the show ended with him. Since 1993 Finkleman had worked only part-time at the CBC; he was also a stockbroker at Desjardins Securities in Toronto.

Randy Bachman's Vinyl Tap was the successor show in this timeslot.
