= Michael Forrestall =

Canadian politician (1932–2006)

The Honourable Michael Forrestall PC

Member of Parliament for Halifax
- In office 1965–1968
- Preceded by: Gerald Regan
- Succeeded by: Riding dissolved

Member of Parliament for Dartmouth—Cole Harbour
- In office 1968–1988
- Preceded by: Riding created
- Succeeded by: Ron MacDonald

Personal details
- Born: September 23, 1932 Deep Brook, Nova Scotia
- Died: June 8, 2006 (aged 73) Halifax, Nova Scotia
- Party: Progressive Conservative
- Profession: Journalist, businessman

John Michael William Curphey Forrestall (September 23, 1932 – June 8, 2006) was a Canadian politician. Forrestall served in both the Senate of Canada and House of Commons of Canada.

== Political career ==
A Nova Scotia journalist and businessman, Forrestall was first elected to the House of Commons of Canada in the 1965 federal election as the Progressive Conservative Member of Parliament (MP) for Halifax, Nova Scotia. He was elected the MP for Dartmouth—Halifax East in the 1968 election, and remained in the House for a total of twenty-three years.

During the Brian Mulroney government, Forrestall served as a parliamentary secretary to a succession of ministers until he was defeated in what was by then the riding of Dartmouth in the 1988 federal election. In November 1990, Prime Minister Mulroney appointed Forrestall to the Senate of Canada, where he sat as a Progressive Conservative until February 2004, when he and most of the Tory caucus joined the new Conservative Party of Canada. Forrestall was active on a number of causes, including benefits for Canadian Merchant Navy veterans and the protection of lighthouses.

In 2000, he introduced a Private Members Bill in the Senate Heritage Lighthouse Protection Act, a bill which was also supported by Senator Pat Carney who championed it after Forrestall's death and which is close to passing in the House of Commons in 2007. Forrestall's brother is the Canadian realist painter, Tom Forrestall; their sister Katherine was the mother of singer-songwriter Matthew Grimson.

== Death ==
Forrestall died on June 8, 2006, at age 73; he had been admitted to a Halifax-area hospital with serious breathing problems five days earlier.

== Electoral history ==
1988 Canadian federal election: Dartmouth—Cole Harbour
| Party | Candidate | Votes | % | ±% |
|---|---|---|---|---|
| Liberal | Ron MacDonald | 21,958 | 46.19 | +20.09 |
| Progressive Conservative | Michael Forrestall | 19,863 | 41.78 | -13.17 |
| New Democratic | Marty Zelenietz | 5,162 | 10.86 | -8.09 |
| Libertarian | Stanley Hodder | 447 | 0.94 | |
| Independent | Charles Spurr | 109 | 0.23 | |
| Total valid votes | | 47,539 | 100.00 | |

1984 Canadian federal election: Dartmouth—Cole Harbour
| Party | Candidate | Votes | % | ±% |
|---|---|---|---|---|
| Progressive Conservative | Michael Forrestall | 27,549 | 54.95 | +13.10 |
| Liberal | Rae Austin | 13,084 | 26.10 | -11.63 |
| New Democratic | Ken Hale | 9,503 | 18.95 | -1.46 |
| Total valid votes | | 50,136 | 100.00 | |

1980 Canadian federal election: Dartmouth—Cole Harbour
| Party | Candidate | Votes | % | ±% |
|---|---|---|---|---|
| Progressive Conservative | Michael Forrestall | 17,968 | 41.85 | -6.87 |
| Liberal | Rae Austin | 16,200 | 37.73 | +2.62 |
| New Democratic | Nelson Reed | 8,764 | 20.41 | +4.24 |
| Total valid votes | | 42,932 | 100.00 | |
lop.parl.ca

1979 Canadian federal election: Dartmouth—Cole Harbour
| Party | Candidate | Votes | % | ±% |
|---|---|---|---|---|
| Progressive Conservative | Michael Forrestall | 21,441 | 48.72 | -2.74 |
| Liberal | John Savage | 15,453 | 35.11 | -5.53 |
| New Democratic | Frederick Turley | 7,116 | 16.17 | +9.00 |
| Total valid votes | | 44,010 | 100.00 | |

1974 Canadian federal election: Dartmouth—Cole Harbour
| Party | Candidate | Votes | % | ±% |
|---|---|---|---|---|
| Progressive Conservative | Michael Forrestall | 22,090 | 51.46 | -6.02 |
| Liberal | Arnold Patterson | 17,444 | 40.64 | +8.93 |
| New Democratic | Alfred Nieforth | 3,076 | 7.17 | -3.03 |
| Social Credit | Anthony Morbee | 181 | 0.42 | -0.19 |
| Marxist–Leninist | Mike Malloch | 135 | 0.31 | |
| Total valid votes | | 42,926 | 100.00 | |

1972 Canadian federal election: Dartmouth—Cole Harbour
| Party | Candidate | Votes | % | ±% |
|---|---|---|---|---|
| Progressive Conservative | Michael Forrestall | 24,553 | 57.48 | +2.31 |
| Liberal | John Savage | 13,543 | 31.71 | -8.71 |
| New Democratic | Norman Dares | 4,358 | 10.20 | +5.80 |
| Social Credit | Brian Pitcairn | 261 | 0.61 | |
| Total valid votes | | 42,715 | 100.00 | |

1968 Canadian federal election: Dartmouth—Cole Harbour
| Party | Candidate | Votes | % |
|---|---|---|---|
| Progressive Conservative | Michael Forrestall | 19,694 | 55.17 |
| Liberal | Arnie Patterson | 14, 429 | 40.42 |
| New Democratic | Edward Newell | 1,572 | 4.40 |
| Total valid votes | | 35,695 | 100.00 |

1965 Canadian federal election: Halifax
| Party | Candidate | Votes | % | ±% | Elected |
|---|---|---|---|---|---|
| Progressive Conservative | Robert McCleave | 46,007 | 25.08 | +1.83 | ✓ |
| Progressive Conservative | Michael Forrestall | 40,983 | 22.34 | | ✓ |
| Liberal | John Lloyd | 39,942 | 21.77 | -3.52 | |
| Liberal | Robert J. Butler | 38,191 | 20.82 | | |
| New Democratic | Jim Aitchison | 8,983 | 4.90 | | |
| New Democratic | Bruce Wallace | 8,387 | 4.57 | | |
| Independent | Ignatius Jeriome Kennedy | 950 | 0.52 | | |
| Total valid votes | | 183,443 | 100.00 | | |
| Progressive Conservative notional gain from Liberal | | Swing | | +4.39 | |
