= Bachman & Turner =

Canadian rock band

- Origin: Winnipeg, Manitoba, Canada
- Genres: Rock, Hard rock, Classic rock
- Years active: 2009-2018
- Labels: Linus Entertainment (Distribution through eOne), RBE, Eagle Records, Cadiz Music
- Spinoff of: Bachman-Turner Overdrive
- Past members: Fred Turner; Randy Bachman; Mick Dalla-Vee; Marc LaFrance; Brent Howard Knudsen
- Website: bachmanandturner.com (defunct)

Bachman & Turner was a musical project formed by Randy Bachman and Fred Turner, which followed the dissolution of Bachman–Turner Overdrive, though the band would later reform in 2023.

== Band history ==
The collaboration started out as a Randy Bachman solo project, but Bachman decided to try to get Fred Turner from his old BTO days to contribute vocals on a track:

...So I sent him one called "Rock n' Roll is the Only Way Out". And he sent me the track back and I went, "Unbelievable! Oh my goodness, I can't believe it!" Me and him together, there's this magic, like a Jagger and Richards kind of thing. I e-mailed him and said, "Do you have any more songs? Fred, I'm willing to change my solo album and it can become a Bachman & Turner album." He said, "Sounds pretty good. I got really excited about doing this song." So he sent me four or five of his songs and I sent him more of mine. And we got together just before Christmas, in December (2009), in Winnipeg.

Bachman & Turner released their eponymous debut on September 7, 2010 in North America and September 20, 2010 in Europe. The album was said to "resurrect the spirit of Bachman Turner Overdrive". The album debuted at #32 on the Canadian Albums Chart. The singles, "Rollin' Along" and "Slave To The Rhythm" were also released via iTunes. The duo was backed on the album and tours by Mick Dalla-Vee, Brent Howard Knudsen and Marc LaFrance, members of Randy Bachman's previous touring band.

Also in 2010, the mini-album Forged In Rock was released in the UK. It contained some of the tracks from the new album, plus classics such as "Takin' Care Of Business" and "You Ain't Seen Nothin' Yet".

In 2011, the band was asked to do a live concert in Chicago for PBS. That was put on hold, but as the band and gear were in New York and there was time open at the Roseland Ballroom, the band went ahead with it there. They recorded a full concert, with Paul Shaffer joining the band for several songs, and released the 2-CD album Live at the Roseland Ballroom, NYC. The concert aired on PBS in 2012, with the title Front Row Center. In 2015, the band released Front Row Center on DVD.

Between 2010 and 2018, the band toured Canada, the US, and Europe. Their last concert was in Niagara Falls NY in 2018, after which Turner amicably retired from touring.

== Use-of-name issue ==
The tour and album plans of 'Bachman & Turner' resulted in a lawsuit by Robbie Bachman and Blair Thornton regarding ownership of the band name Bachman–Turner Overdrive and related trademarks. Randy Bachman and Burton Cummings previously encountered similar difficulties in relation to the Guess Who name, which is owned by original Guess Who bassist Jim Kale; this resulted in Bachman & Cummings touring since 2005 as 'Bachman-Cummings', rather than The Guess Who. Robbie Bachman and Thornton claim that US and Canadian rights for the BTO name and trademark were transferred to Rob Bachman, Blair Thornton and Fred Turner when Randy Bachman commenced a solo career in 1977. Ownership of rights in relation to the name(s) outside of the United States and Canada are uncertain; it is unclear whether this claim relates to both 'Bachman-Turner Overdrive' and 'BTO', or solely the latter. Randy Bachman is said to have registered the names 'Bachman-Turner', 'BTU', 'Bachman-Turner United' and 'Bachman-Turner Union' in the United States and Canada. The current status of European or global ownership of the band name(s) and trademarks is uncertain. These names are said to cause confusion with the names 'Bachman-Turner Overdrive' and 'BTO', resulting in potential damages to Robbie Bachman and Blair Thornton. There appears to be a general legal agreement that one can perform under one's own legal names, so Randy Bachman and Fred Turner were billed as 'Bachman & Turner' on recordings and for touring purposes.

== Discography ==
Albums

- Bachman & Turner (2010), Cadiz Music
- Forged In Rock (2010), Classic Rock Magazine/Future plc (UK)
- Live at the Roseland Ballroom, NYC (2011), Eagle Records

Singles

- "Slave To The Rhythm" (2010)
- "Rollin' Along" (2010)

DVD

- Front Row Center (2015)
