= Deep Dive (disambiguation) =

Deep diving is underwater diving to a depth beyond the normal range.

Deep Dive may refer to:

- Deep Dive (radio show), program on CBC Radio One
- Baja Deep Dive, flavor of Baja Blast
- "Deep Dive", a 2026 song by Park Junhee; South Korea's 2026 entry in the Eurovision Song Contest Asia
- "Deep Dive", a 2026 song by Todoroki Hajime
