= Clyde Gilmour =

Canadian film critic and radio personality (1912–1997)

- Born: 8 June 1912; Calgary, Alberta, Canada
- Died: 7 November 1997 (aged 85); Toronto, Ontario, Canada
- Occupations: Radio host/personality, critic, journalist
- Career
- Show: Gilmour's Albums
- Station: CBC Radio
- Country: Canada

Clyde Gilmour, CM (8 June 1912 in Calgary – 7 November 1997 in Toronto) was a Canadian broadcaster and print journalist, mostly known for his half-century career with CBC Radio.

== Early life and education ==
Gilmour was raised in Medicine Hat, Alberta, where he attended Alexandra High School until graduation in 1929. The conditions of the Great Depression prevented Gilmour from continuing to university.

== Career ==
In 1930, Gilmour joined the Medicine Hat News staff. He served as a war correspondent and in public relations during World War II, and held the rank of lieutenant. He then moved to Vancouver, where he wrote film and music reviews for the Vancouver Province and Vancouver Sun newspapers, including a review in 1950 of some early Oscar Peterson recordings. He broadcast film reviews on station for CBC Radio on CBU.

In 1954, Gilmour moved to Toronto and wrote similar columns for Maclean's magazine and then the Toronto Telegram until that newspaper's demise in 1971. He later wrote for the Toronto Star as a film critic for the remainder of the 1970s. On 5 October 1956, he broadcast the first episode of Gilmour's Albums, a weekly music programme on CBC Radio which continued for more than 40 years until 14 June 1997.

Selections on the programme were generally drawn from his personal collection which eventually included 10,000 vinyl records and 4000 Compact Discs. These items were bequeathed to the CBC and today form the Clyde Gilmour Collection. Gilmour's Albums established a record longevity for single-host CBC Radio shows.

Gilmour was appointed a Member of the Order of Canada in 1975. He died at St. Joseph's Health Centre, Toronto, on 7 November 1997, aged 85. The Toronto Film Critics Association occasionally presents the Clyde Gilmour Award in his honour; created in 1997, Gilmour himself was posthumously honoured as the award's first recipient.

== Career timeline ==
- 1930–1936: Medicine Hat News, newspaper columnist and reporter
- 1936–1942: Edmonton Journal
- c. 1939–1945 World War II: Navy News writer, wartime public relations
- 1945–1949: Vancouver Province
- 1947–1964: CBC Radio, film reviewer
- 1949–1952: Mayfair, music columnist
- 1949–1954: Vancouver Sun, film reviewer
- 1950–1964: Maclean's, film reviewer
- 1953–1955: Window On Canada, CBC Television, host
- 1954–1971: Toronto Telegram, film reviewer
- 1956–1997: Gilmour's Albums, CBC Radio
- 1958–1959: Folio, CBC Television
- 1971–1980: Toronto Star, film reviewer
- 1977–1983: Audio Canada, magazine writer
- 1980–1983: Toronto Star, features
- 1983–1985: Leisure Ways

== Awards and recognition ==
- 1975: Member, Order of Canada
- 1976: Honorary Doctor of Laws from McMaster University
- 1990: Canadian News Hall of Fame
