= Ron MacDonald (politician) =

Canadian politician

Ronald Joseph MacDonald

Member of Parliament for Dartmouth
- In office 1988–1997
- Preceded by: Michael Forrestall
- Succeeded by: Wendy Lill

Personal details
- Born: 23 June 1955 (age 71) New Waterford, Nova Scotia
- Party: Liberal
- Profession: Business executive

Ronald Joseph MacDonald (born 23 June 1955 in New Waterford, Nova Scotia) was a member of the House of Commons of Canada from 1988 to 1997, as the member of parliament for Dartmouth. By career, he was a business executive. He also served as the executive director of the Nova Scotia Liberal Association.

== Early career ==
During his time as an MP he was chair of the Standing Committee on Fisheries and Oceans, the Atlantic Liberal Caucus and the Caucus Committee on Political Organization. MacDonald was also vice-chair of the Standing Committee of Consumer and Corporate affairs and Government Operations.

In 1996 he was appointed by the Prime Minister of Canada as Parliamentary Secretary of International Trade. He also served as the executive director of the Nova Scotia Liberal Association.

MacDonald won the Dartmouth electoral district for the Liberal party in the 1988 and 1993 Federal elections. After serving in the 34th and 35th Canadian Parliaments, MacDonald left federal politics in 1997 and did not seek re-election.

Prior to his election to the Canadian Parliament, he served for 2 years as the Special Assistant to the Deputy Prime Minister of Canada, as well as serving as Chief of Staff to leader of the Government in the Senate of Canada.

== Later career ==
He moved to British Columbia, and from 1997 to 2002 was president and CEO of the Council of Forest Industries, the largest lumber manufacturing, grading and marketing group in Canada. During that time he became one of the founding members and director of Canada Wood, which developed wood markets in China, Korea, India and Japan. From 2003 to 2006 he was also advisor, international market development to the president and CEO of Canfor Ltd., at the time Canada's largest lumber manufacturer.

MacDonald served as executive chairman of Critical Elements Corporation, where he is overseeing the development of joint-venture and long-term supply opportunities as well as financing strategies for their lithium and tantalum property in northern Quebec. He was also executive chairman of American Vanadium Corporation, which is developing a vanadium property in Nevada, and executive chairman of Canada Strategic Metals, which has one of the largest graphite portfolios in North America.

Prior to joining Critical Elements and American Vanadium, MacDonald formed and became president and CEO of Cansource International, a natural resource focused international marketing and strategic management consultancy. MacDonald was a member of the OECD Committee which developed international guidelines concerning the use of conflict minerals. (Note: The OECD Due Diligence Guidance for Responsible Supply Chains of Minerals from Conflict-Affected and High-Risk Areas) He also participated on the Electronic Industry Citizenship Coalition committee developing guidelines for their global tantalum smelter verification program, and has also been a contributor to the EU Commission 'Framework 7' policy paper on 'Scarcity of Strategic Minerals'. MacDonald is a presenter at conferences in North America, Europe and Asia on the criticality of resources deemed strategic for high tech, green energy and the rapidly evolving grid level mass storage and electric vehicle battery industries.

== Electoral history ==
1993 Canadian federal election: Dartmouth—Cole Harbour
Party	Candidate	Votes	%	±%
Liberal	Ron MacDonald	23,368	50.81	+4.62
Progressive Conservative	Judith Gass	10,843	23.58	-18.20
Reform	Orest Ulan	7,182	15.62	
New Democratic	Marty Zelenietz	3,261	7.09	-3.77
National	Cliff Williams	823	1.79	
Natural Law	Claude Viau	515	1.12	
Total valid votes		45,992	100.00	

1988 Canadian federal election: Dartmouth—Cole Harbour
Party	Candidate	Votes	%	±%
Liberal	Ron MacDonald	21,958	46.19	+20.09
Progressive Conservative	Michael Forrestall	19,863	41.78	-13.17
New Democratic	Marty Zelenietz	5,162	10.86	-8.09
Libertarian	Stanley Hodder	447	0.94	
Independent	Charles Spurr	109	0.23	
Total valid votes		47,539	100.00	
