= Michèle Raymond =

Canadian politician and author

MLA for Halifax Atlantic
- In office August 5, 2003 – September 7, 2013
- Preceded by: Robert Chisholm
- Succeeded by: Brendan Maguire

Personal details
- Born: Michèle Hovey Raymond; 1958 Toronto, Ontario
- Party: NDP

Michèle Hovey Raymond (born 1958) is a Canadian politician and author. She formerly served as Halifax Atlantic's NDP MLA.

== Early life and education ==
A Halifax-area resident since 1963, she received a degree in linguistics from Yale University in 1978 and a degree in law from Dalhousie University. Her mother was Jocelyn Motyer Raymond (1930-2007), an educator and researcher at University of Toronto's Institute for Child Study.

== Before politics ==
Prior to becoming a politician, Raymond co-founded the Urban Farm Museum Society of Spryfield and has been part of a campaign to reactivate the Northwest Arm Ferry. She has volunteered with the Nova Scotia Museum and is a former vice-president of the Heritage Trust of Nova Scotia and other heritage societies around Nova Scotia for which she was awarded the Queen's Jubilee Medal. She is also the co-author with historian Heather Watts of Halifax's Northwest Arm: An Illustrated History published by Formac Publishing in 2003.

== Political career ==
In her first attempt at political office, Raymond was elected MLA in 2003, replacing Robert Chisholm, who retired.

On November 23, 2012, Raymond announced that she would not be running in the next election.

== Personal life ==
She is married to former Liberal MLA Russell MacKinnon.
