= Deep Dive (radio show) =

Canadian radio program

- Genre: pop music
- Country of origin: Canada
- Language(s): English
- Home station: CBC Music
- Starring: Rich Terfy
- Original release: July 2021 – present

Deep Dive is a Canadian radio program, which airs on CBC Radio One. Hosted by Rich Terfy, the program showcases famous record albums of various genres, which are played in their entirety with various anecdotes told between tracks.

The program premiered in July 2021 as a short-run summer series, to replace Vinyl Tap starring Randy Bachmann, and thereafter became part of the network's regular schedule.
