= CKEC-FM =

Radio station in New Glasgow, Nova Scotia

Coordinates: 45°32′24″N 62°56′44″W

- New Glasgow, Nova Scotia; Canada
- Broadcast area: Pictou County
- Frequency: 94.1 MHz
- Branding: 94.1 The Breeze

Programming
- Format: Soft adult contemporary

Ownership
- Owner: Stingray Group
- Sister stations: CKEZ-FM

History
- First air date: December 23, 1953
- Former frequencies: 230 kHz (AM) (1953–1960); 1320 kHz (1960–2008)
- Call sign meaning: East Coast

Technical information
- Class: C1
- ERP: 36.68 kW average 80 kW peak horizontal polarization only
- HAAT: 207.8 meters (682 ft)

Links
- Webcast: Listen Live
- Website: 941thebreeze.com

CKEC-FM is a Canadian radio station broadcasting at 94.1 FM in New Glasgow, Nova Scotia, owned by the Stingray Group. The station airs a soft adult contemporary format branded as 94.1 The Breeze. The transmitter tower is situated on Mount Thom.

== History ==
In 1953, Hector Publishing Co. Ltd. applied for a radio station licence – 1230 kHz with 250 watts of power (non-directional). The application was approved by the CBC. The company was headed by James M. Cameron, publisher of the weekly paper, Eastern Chronicle, of New Glasgow. Construction of CKED was underway in September and the station was expected on the air later in the fall. CKEC signed on the air on December 23 of that year.

In 1960, CKEC moved to 1320 kHz and increased power to 1,000 watts then in 1962 The Trans-Canada and Dominion networks were consolidated into a single CBC radio service. Following the merger, CKEC remained as a CBC affiliate.

On August 10, 1983, CKEC was given approval do disaffiliate from the CBC as network service was now available via CBHN-FM.

In 1988, CKEC was granted a power increase from 5,000 watts to 25,000 watts and the relocation of the transmitter site from Frasers Mountain near New Glasgow, to Frasers Road in Abercrombie, approximately 8.3 kilometers to the northwest of the existing site. CKEC marked its 35th anniversary on December 23 and marked the event by boosting its power from 5,000 watts to 25,000 watts.

On March 24, 2006, the CRTC approved an application by Hector Broadcasting Company Limited for a broadcasting licence to operate a new English-language FM radio station at New Glasgow to replace its AM station CKEC, which was the only local commercial radio station in that market. The Commission denied the applications by Astral Media Radio Atlantic Inc., Atlantic Broadcasters Limited and Acadia Broadcasting Limited for broadcasting licences to operate English-language commercial FM radio stations at New Glasgow. Hector had operated AM radio station CKEC, the only local commercial radio station in New Glasgow, since 1953. The applicant indicated that the proposed conversion of its AM station to the FM band would alleviate night-time technical difficulties, thereby allowing Hector to provide better quality service to the community at all times of the day. The applicant’s use of frequency 94.1 MHz would result in the proposed new FM radio station’s secondary 0.5 mV/m contour enclosing the communities of Antigonish, Truro, Kenzieville, Melrose and Tatamagouche. Hector’s proposed new FM radio station would maintain CKEC’s existing format, a broad-based AC format targeting an audience aged 25 to 54. The applicant indicated that 100% of its programming would continue to be station-produced, and that its music programming would continue to include specialty music in the genres of Country, Celtic and Nostalgia, all of which would complement its general Adult Contemporary format. Hector further committed to provide the same levels of community-oriented spoken word and specialty music programming as offered on CKEC. During each broadcast week, at least 21 hours would be devoted to spoken word programming, of which 9 hours each week would be devoted to news, weather, and traffic information. Of the 9 hours of news and related surveillance material to be broadcast by the new station each week, 50% would be devoted to local New Glasgow stories, as well as a one-hour news magazine program. The Commission noted that, in addition to CKEC, area listeners were served by a variety of out-of-market stations, including CBHA-FM Halifax and CBCH-FM Charlottetown, both of which offered CBC’s Radio Two network programming; CKTY-FM and CKTO-FM Truro, which offered Country music and “EZ Rock” programming, respectively; CHLQ-FM and CFCY Charlottetown with Hot AC and Country music respectively; CHTN Charlottetown, with Oldies; and CJFX-FM Antigonish, which provided a Hot AC/Classic Rock Gold musical format. The new station would operate at 94.1 MHz (channel 231C1) with an average effective radiated power of 36,680 watts. The licence would expire August 31, 2012.

After 54 years on the AM band, CKEC (“94.1 East Coast FM”) made the flip to the FM band at 9:41 a.m. on December 11, 2007. The new format was Hot AC, highlighting established and emerging East Coast artists. Station owner and President Doug Freeman was on hand for the move to FM. Before the December 11 launch, CKEC-FM went through a period of on-air testing.

In 2016, Doug Freeman died at the age of 84 on August 2. His radio and TV career spanned 69 years. At the age of 19 he was thought to be the youngest program director in Canadian radio, at CKCL Truro. In 1964 he purchased Hector Broadcasting, becoming owner of CKEC and making public service a key priority for the company over the years.

In November 2017, CKEC rebranded from East Coast FM to Mix 94.1. The format remained Adult Contemporary.

On July 12, 2018, the CRTC approved the application by Newcap Inc. for authority to acquire the assets of CKEC-FM and CKEZ-FM from Hector Broadcasting Limited. October 23, of that year, the CRTC approved an application by Newfoundland Capital Corporation Limited, on behalf of Newcap Inc. and its licensed broadcasting subsidiaries, for authorization to effect a change in the ownership and effective control of various radio and television broadcasting undertakings in British Columbia, Alberta, Ontario, New Brunswick, Nova Scotia, Prince Edward Island, and Newfoundland and Labrador, so that effective control of the undertakings would be exercised by Eric Boyko (Stingray Digital Group Inc.). Stingray took ownership of the stations just a few days later.

On January 15, 2021, at 12:01 a.m., CKEC shifted to soft adult contemporary and rebranded as 94.1 The Breeze.

== On Air Line-Up ==
- 6am-10am More Music Mornings with Emma Freckelton
- 10am-3pm At Work With Drew
- 3pm-7pm The Drive Home with Corey Tremere
- 7pm-12m Evening Breeze With Stacey Thompson

== Former logo ==
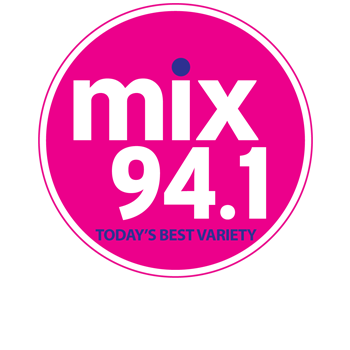
