= CFLT-FM =

Radio station in Dartmouth, Nova Scotia, Canada

Coordinates: 44°39′03″N 63°39′25″W

- Dartmouth, Nova Scotia; Canada
- Broadcast area: Halifax Regional Municipality
- Frequency: 92.9 MHz
- Branding: Jack 92.9

Programming
- Language: English
- Format: Adult hits

Ownership
- Owner: Rogers Radio; (Rogers Media, Inc.)

History
- First air date: December 5, 1962
- Former call signs: CFDR (1962–2009)
- Former frequencies: 790 kHz (AM) (1962–1978); 680 kHz (1978–1991); 780 kHz (1991–2009)
- Call sign meaning: "Lite" (former branding)

Technical information
- Class: C1
- ERP: 63,000 watts
- HAAT: 196 metres (643 ft)

Links
- Webcast: Listen Live
- Website: jack929.com

CFLT-FM (92.9 MHz) is a commercial radio station licensed to Dartmouth, Nova Scotia, Canada, and serving the Halifax Regional Municipality. The station is owned by Rogers Radio, a division of Rogers Sports & Media, and broadcasts an adult hits format, using the syndicated music service and trademark known as Jack 92.9.

The radio studios are on Young Street in Halifax, while its transmitter is on Washmill Lake Drive in Clayton Park.

The station is the successor to Newcap-owned AM station CFDR (780 kHz), which signed off the air on July 27, 2009, eleven days before the FM station's official launch.

== History ==
=== CFDR ===
CFDR had made its home at various locations on the dial, first at 790 kHz, moving to 680 kHz in 1978, then to 780 kHz in 1991.

Originally owned and operated by Patterson Broadcasters Ltd. (consisting of President C.A. (Arnie) Patterson, Senior Vice-president/National Sales Director W.L. (Bill) Patterson and Vice-president/Chief Engineer Jack Hutchison), CFDR (the "DR" standing for "Dartmouth Radio"), also known as "CF Big 'D' R", first hit the AM dial in 1962. The studios were originally located at 66 Ochterloney St. in Dartmouth, and moved to 12 Queen St. in 1971, until the decision was made in 1981 to occupy half of the 18th floor and the entire penthouse (19th floor) of the Queen Square building (which commanded an excellent view of Halifax Harbour). CFDR and CFRQ moved their broadcasting facilities to the CIEZ building in Bedford in 1995.

CFDR's final logo as an AM station

The station's 790 kHz transmitter was on the Montague Mines Road in the suburbs of Dartmouth before relocating to Kearney Lake Road in Bedford with the change to 680 kHz. When the frequency changed to 780 kHz, the transmitter was moved to St. Margaret's Bay Road in the HRM community of Lakeside.

Popular disc jockeys during CFDR's flagship easy listening era included avuncular morning man Gerry Parsons (with his signature "March Around the Breakfast Table"), smooth-voiced Tony Beech (of Sunday night's "Candlelight and Wine" renown), Jack Hutchison's "Tartan Hour" on Saturday mornings, Program Director Gail Rice (mid-days), Clary Stubbert (afternoon drive), midnights with Dave Tramley and Paul Meagher, traffic reporter. Other popular former DJs and announcers include Colleen Jones, "Graveyard Shifter" Ron Roberts, Andrew Boyle, Cam Allen, Dale Schwartz, John Cunningham and John Kyte.

CFDR was an easy listening station until 1987, when it changed its format to contemporary hit radio; around the same time, it also began broadcasting in Motorola C-QUAM AM stereo. The format change to Top 40 was protested vehemently by fans of the easy listening format in the Halifax area. It generated many complaints to the Canadian Radio-television and Telecommunications Commission (CRTC), and to the station itself, but the format change stood until it switched to the country music format in December 1993. Ultimately, the station became known as Classic Country 780 KIXX, differentiating itself from Halifax's more popular contemporary country station CHFX-FM; in addition, CFDR became one of a handful of radio stations in Canada to air the format.

=== Conversion to FM and sale ===
After CHNS moved to an FM frequency in July 2006, only two Halifax stations, CFDR and CJCH, remained on the AM dial in a market with over a dozen FM stations. In October 2006, Newcap applied to the CRTC to move CFDR to the FM band at 88.9 MHz. It was to drop its country format in favour of alternative rock, since CHFX would continue to air a country format. The station was to be branded LIVE 88.9, patterned after Newcap's Ottawa station CILV-FM. The move was approved in 2007, on condition that Newcap sell its 50% interest in CKUL-FM. With Newcap also owning CFRQ, as well as 50% of CKUL, converting CFDR to FM would have put Newcap in violation of CRTC regulations on radio station ownership, which limits a single company to two AM and two FM stations per market.

After CTVglobemedia announced plans to convert CJCH to FM as well, it was required to divest its own 50% share of CKUL to proceed with the conversion (as it also owned CIOO-FM). Newcap then elected in early 2008 to acquire full control of CKUL, negating its own conversion plans in the process.

However, this left CFDR as the last remaining AM station in the market, with Newcap unable to move the station to FM. Thus, later in the year, the company announced it would trade CFDR to Rogers Radio in exchange for Rogers' Sudbury station CIGM, with both stations applying to move to FM following the trade. CIGM's situation paralleled that of CFDR: it was the last AM station remaining in the Sudbury market, where Rogers already owned two FM stations, and hence it would not be permitted to convert to FM under Rogers ownership. Rogers later announced it would move CFDR to 92.9 MHz rather than the previously approved 88.9. The applications were approved by the CRTC on November 24, 2008.

CFDR went off the air permanently on July 27, 2009, at 10:00 a.m. ADT, coinciding with the final consummation of the Rogers-Newcap swap. The last two songs played were "Who's Gonna Fill Their Shoes" by George Jones and "Happy Trails" by Dale Evans and Roy Rogers. A farewell message was posted by morning hosts Frank Lowe and Stephanie Woodin on Kixx's former (now defunct) website 780kixx.ca.

CFDR was the last remaining AM station in the Halifax area prior to the shutdown. CFDR was also the most powerful AM station in the province during the day at 50,000 watts. At night, power was reduced to 15,000 watts. Competing AM stations CJCH and CHNS left the air in 2008 and 2006, respectively.

=== Lite 92.9 ===
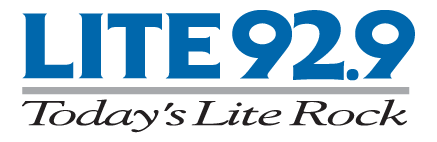
CFLT's logo as Lite 92.9

Rogers initially indicated that it would follow through with Newcap's plan to air alternative rock on the relaunched station. However, they ended up adopting an adult contemporary format, known as Lite 92.9, patterned after Rogers-owned CHFM-FM in Calgary.

=== 92.9 Jack FM ===
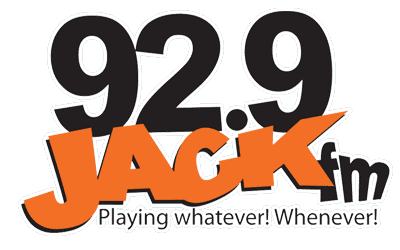
Previous logo as "92.9 Jack FM"

On February 28, 2014, at 8 AM, CFLT-FM changed their format to adult hits, branded as 92.9 Jack FM. The last song on "Lite" was "Forget You" by Cee-Lo Green, while the first song on "Jack" was "We Will Rock You" by Queen. With the change, CFLT brought back "Griff & Caroline In The Morning", previously heard on CKUL-FM before they dropped the show upon changing formats in August 2013.

CFLT-FM would later themselves drop “Griff & Caroline In The Morning” in July 2026 due to cutbacks within Rogers Sports & Media.
