= Robert Chisholm (Canadian politician) =

Canadian politician (born 1957)

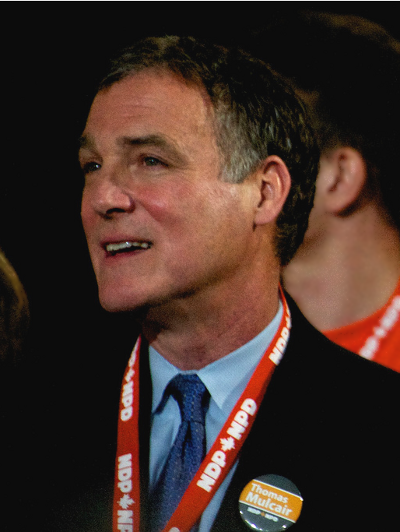

Member of Parliament for Dartmouth—Cole Harbour
- In office May 30, 2011 – August 4, 2015
- Preceded by: Michael Savage
- Succeeded by: Darren Fisher

Nova Scotia Leader of the Official Opposition
- In office 1998–1999
- Preceded by: John Hamm
- Succeeded by: John MacDonell

Leader of the Nova Scotia New Democratic Party
- In office 1996–2000
- Preceded by: John Holm
- Succeeded by: Helen MacDonald

Member of the Nova Scotia Legislative Assembly for Halifax Atlantic
- In office August 27, 1991 – August 5, 2003
- Preceded by: John Buchanan
- Succeeded by: Michèle Raymond

Personal details
- Born: Robert Lawrence Chisholm; August 31, 1957 (age 69) Kentville, Nova Scotia
- Party: New Democratic; Nova Scotia New Democratic
- Spouse: Paula Simon
- Education: Carleton University; Dalhousie University

Robert Lawrence Chisholm (born August 31, 1957) is a Canadian former politician who was the leader of the Nova Scotia New Democratic Party (NDP) from 1996 to 2000, serving as leader of the Official Opposition in Nova Scotia from 1998 to 1999. He represented the Halifax Atlantic riding in the Nova Scotia House of Assembly from 1991 to 2003 and was the member of Parliament (MP) for Dartmouth—Cole Harbour from 2011 to 2015.

After the 2003 Nova Scotia election, Chisholm worked as researcher for the Canadian Union of Public Employees (CUPE). He has been a member of Dalhousie University's board of governors since 2004. In 2007, he became CUPE's Regional Director for the Atlantic Region. In the spring of 2009, he started a consulting firm with his wife Paula Simon: Simon Chisholm Consulting.

== Political career ==
=== 1998 Nova Scotia general election ===
The NDP scored a surprise electoral success in the 1997 federal election, winning six of Nova Scotia's eleven electoral districts. This new-found electoral success boded well for the NDP's provincial party, which was able to take advantage of the new wave of popularity. Prior to 1997, the Nova Scotia NDP had not been considered contenders to form a provincial government.

Chisholm subsequently lead the NDP to a record 19 seats (out of the House of Assembly's 52 seats) in the 1998 provincial election, putting them in a tie with the governing Liberal Party. The Liberals were able to continue ruling, as they received support from the third-place Progressive Conservatives, who held 14 seats. The NDP formed the Official Opposition, marking the first time they attained that position; the Co-operative Commonwealth Federation (CCF), were the last democratic socialist party to hold that title, back in 1949.

=== 1999 Nova Scotia election ===
15 months later, the Liberal government was defeated by a motion of non-confidence from the Conservatives, forcing an election in the summer of 1999. During the campaign, it was revealed that Chisholm had a past criminal record for driving under the influence of alcohol when he was 19 years old. The NDP lost eight seats during the campaign, which saw the third-place Conservatives elected to a majority government.

During this period, the NDP shared official opposition status with the Liberals (as both held 11 seats). The NDP became sole official opposition upon Russell MacLellan's resignation, and the subsequent election of Progressive Conservative Cecil Clark, which gave the NDP 11 seats to the Liberals' 10. Chisholm unexpectedly resigned the leadership after the campaign, at the November 6, 1999 NSNDP provincial council meeting. He said that he wanted to spend more time with his family and could not subject them to ten more years of political life. He remained sitting as an MLA in the Legislature and remained as leader until a new one was elected.

He was succeeded by Helen MacDonald in 2000; and after she could not win a seat in the house, Darrell Dexter eventually became the leader in 2001. Chisholm did not run for re-election as an MLA in 2003 provincial election.

=== Federal politics ===
On January 18, 2011, Chisholm announced that he would seek the New Democratic Party nomination in Dartmouth—Cole Harbour for the 2011 federal election, and was officially nominated on January 25. On May 2, 2011, he was elected, winning 15,661 votes and defeating Liberal Party incumbent Mike Savage.

Following the death of federal NDP leader Jack Layton, Chisholm was a candidate in the 2012 New Democratic Party leadership election, but after speaking English during a leadership debate in French on account of his lack of fluency in the latter language, he withdrew in December 2011 and subsequently endorsed Thomas Mulcair.

In the 2015 federal election, Chisholm was defeated by Liberal Darren Fisher.

Chisholm endorsed Alberta MP Heather McPherson in the 2026 New Democratic Party leadership election.

== Electoral history ==
2015 Canadian federal election: Dartmouth—Cole Harbour
Party	Candidate	Votes	%	±%	Expenditures
Liberal	Darren Fisher	30,407	58.17	+23.45	$64,958.30
New Democratic	Robert Chisholm	12,757	24.41	–12.02	$137,358.97
Conservative	Jason Cole	7,331	14.03	–11.00	$52,263.31
Green	Brynn Nheiley	1,775	3.40	–0.43	$723.31
Total valid votes/expense limit		52,270	99.62		$205,945.13
Total rejected ballots		201	0.38		
Turnout		52,471	71.81		
Eligible voters		73,066			
Liberal gain from New Democratic		Swing		+17.73	
Source: Elections Canada

2011 Canadian federal election: Dartmouth—Cole Harbour
Party	Candidate	Votes	%	±%	Expenditures
New Democratic	Robert Chisholm	15,678	36.27	+4.73	$51,111.67
Liberal	Mike Savage	15,181	35.12	-4.37	$70,147.67
Conservative	Wanda Webber	10,702	24.76	+2.30	$51,126.57
Green	Paul Shreenan	1,662	3.85	-2.11	$0.00
Total valid votes/expense limit		43,223	99.41		$83,954.73
Total rejected, unmarked and declined ballots		255	0.59	-0.01	
Turnout		43,478	61.45	+2.72	
Eligible voters		70,756			
New Democratic gain from Liberal		Swing		+4.55	
