= CKUL-FM =

Radio station in Halifax, Nova Scotia

Coordinates: 44°38′47″N 63°39′37″W

- Halifax, Nova Scotia; Canada
- Broadcast area: Halifax Regional Municipality
- Frequency: 96.5 MHz
- Branding: 96.5 The Breeze

Programming
- Format: Soft adult contemporary

Ownership
- Owner: Stingray Group; (Stingray Radio, Inc.)
- Sister stations: CFRQ-FM

History
- First air date: August 30, 1990
- Former call signs: CIEZ-FM (1990–2001)
- Call sign meaning: Sounds like "cool" (former branding)

Technical information
- Class: C1
- ERP: 100,000 watts
- HAAT: 185.1 metres (607 ft)

Links
- Webcast: Listen Live
- Website: 965thebreeze.com

CKUL-FM (96.5 FM, "96.5 The Breeze") is a radio station serving Halifax, Nova Scotia. Owned by Stingray Group, it broadcasts a soft adult contemporary format. CKUL's studios and offices are located on Kempt Road in Halifax, while its transmitter is located on Washmill Lake Drive in Clayton Park.

== History ==
After receiving CRTC approval on March 5, 1990, the station first went on the air on August 30 of that year as 96.5 Sun FM, under the original call letters CIEZ-FM originally with an easy listening/beautiful music format. It was owned by Sun Radio Ltd. at this time. Shortly thereafter, the station became adult contemporary after entering a local marketing agreement with CHUM Limited and Newcap Radio. In 2001, the station became adult hits, branded as FM 96.5, and on November 1, 2004, the station rebranded as 96.5 Kool FM, and adopted its current call letters. The adult hits format evolved into classic hits over the years.

The station was operated for several years as a joint venture between Newcap Radio and CHUM Limited (later purchased by CTVglobemedia), as part of their five-station "Metro Radio Group" local marketing agreement, later disbanded by order of the CRTC. In 2007, both companies received approval to convert their remaining AM stations in the market, CFDR and CJCH respectively, to the FM band, which would give each company two wholly owned FM stations in the Halifax market, the maximum permitted under current CRTC regulations. Newcap later acquired CTVglobemedia's share of CKUL. At the same time, Newcap sold CFDR to Rogers Radio, which changed it to CFLT-FM.

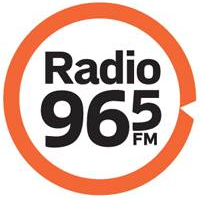
Logo as Radio 96.5. The "Mix" logo used a purple-coloured version of the same logo.

On August 26, 2013, at Noon, after playing "Thank You for Being a Friend" by Andrew Gold, CKUL flipped to adult album alternative as Radio 96.5; the first song as "Radio" was "It's Time" by Imagine Dragons. In January 2016, former CKHZ-FM program director Dan Barton joined CKUL; a month later, on February 25 at 3PM, the station shifted to hot adult contemporary as Mix 96.5. The move was presented as more of a natural evolution of the "Radio" format than an outright flip, as the station retained a significant portion of the previous playlist; this was such that even the "Mix" logo was merely a slightly altered version of the "Radio" one. The last song as "Radio" was "Electric Love" by Borns; the first as "Mix" was "Adventure of a Lifetime" by Coldplay.

On January 15, 2019, it was announced that the station would flip to soft adult contemporary as 96.5 The Breeze that Thursday at midnight, joining sister stations in Vancouver and Edmonton in having adopted the format. Later that day, competitor CKHY-FM preemptively switched to soft AC itself as Jewel 105; the flip would be undone in 2021 after the station's sale to new owners.

In April 2021, CKUL began to syndicate its morning show The Morning Breeze to its sister stations, as part of a corporate restructuring and network programming strategy by Stingray. The program is customized with local segments and contributions from a reporter in each market.
