= CFRQ-FM =

Radio station in Halifax, Nova Scotia, Canada

Coordinates: 44°38′47″N 63°39′37″W

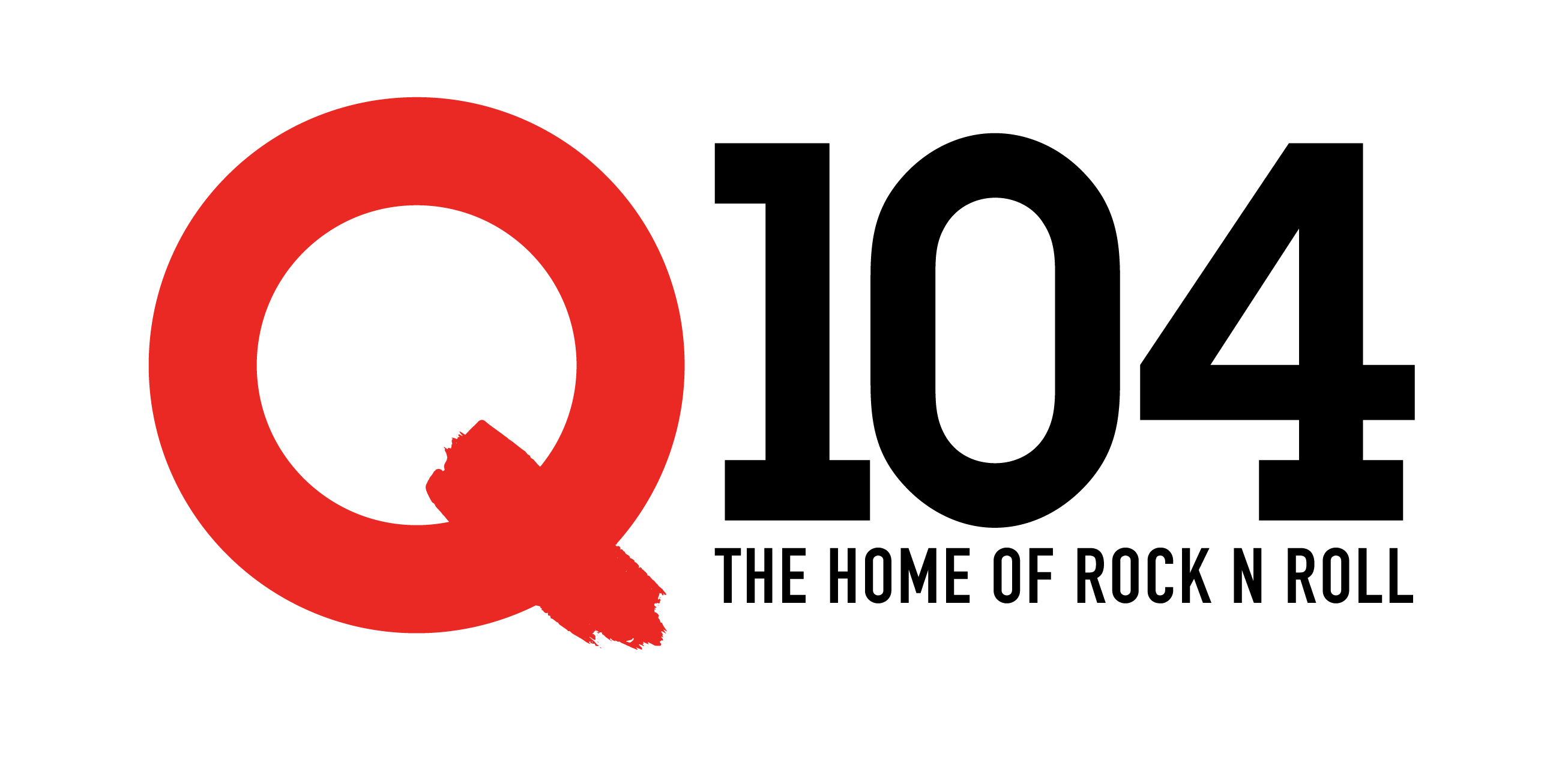
- Halifax, Nova Scotia; Canada
- Broadcast area: Halifax Regional Municipality
- Frequency: 104.3 MHz (HD Radio)
- Branding: Q104

Programming
- Format: Mainstream rock
- Affiliations: HFX Wanderers FC

Ownership
- Owner: Stingray Group; (Stingray Radio, Inc.)
- Sister stations: CKUL-FM

History
- First air date: November 28, 1983
- Call sign meaning: C-FReQuency, alternatively C(Sea)-Freak

Technical information
- Class: C
- ERP: 100,000 watts
- HAAT: 185.1 metres (607 ft)

Links
- Webcast: Listen Live
- Website: q104.ca

CFRQ-FM (104.3 FM) is a Canadian radio station in Halifax, Nova Scotia. It is owned by Stingray Radio and airs a mainstream rock format. CFRQ uses the on-air brand name Q104 (The Mighty Q or The Q for short). CFRQ's audience is often referred to as the "Q-Nation". CFRQ's studios are located on Kempt Road in Halifax, while its transmitter is located on Washmill Lake Drive in Clayton Park.

== Programming ==
The station's current on-air lineup includes BJ and The Q Morning Crew featuring BJ Wilson, Bobby Mac and Gillian Foote. Anna Zee, the four-time winner of the National Music Director of The Year (medium market) award, is heard in mid-days. Afternoon drive time features Tom Bedell (who is also host of The Q104 Early Dismissal, the 5 O'Clock Traffic Jam, and the award-winning local music program Route 104).

The station's evening program, The Rock of the Atlantic, is hosted by Neil Spence, and networked to its sister stations CJMO-FM Moncton, CHNI-FM Saint John, and CKEZ-FM New Glasgow. In January 2021, the three stations all adopted similar Q branding as the "Q Network", and also began to simulcast CFRQ's morning show.

== History ==
CFRQ was launched on November 28, 1983, by President Arnie Patterson of Patterson Broadcasters (also operators of CFDR at the time), Senior Vice-President/National Sales Director Bill Patterson and Vice-President/Chief Engineer Jack Hutchison. The station's original slogan was "The Rock of the Atlantic." The first song played on "Q" was "Rock and Roll" by Led Zeppelin.

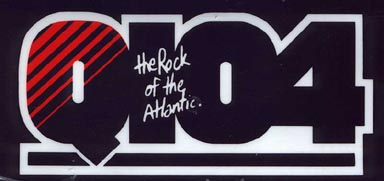
Original station logo

Former logo

The station's original line-up consisted of the "Morning Zoo" with Brother Jake Edwards, Hal Harbour (Doug Barron), and "Billy-Bob" (Bill Phillips), mid-days with "The Legend" Bob Powers, afternoon drive with Andy K., six-o'clock rock report with "Rockin'" Ray Plourde, as well as the Midnight Metal Show and weekend afternoons with Jessica Taylor who also created and did the voice of Bambi Fawn from the morning shows sponsored "Between the Sheets". Other original on-air personalities included Jim Armstrong (formerly of CFQM-FM Moncton and later CJMO-FM), Brenda Oland ("Ms. Information"), Doug Caldwell, Andrew Gillis ("Les Ismore"), Sylvie Schmid ("Jane Fondle"), and Andrew Boyle (sports).

CFRQ's evening program "The Rock of The Atlantic" (taking its name from the station's original slogan), airing weeknights from 7pm to 12am, was launched in August 2016 and simulcasts on CKEZ-FM New Glasgow, CJMO-FM Moncton and CHNI-FM Saint John.

CFRQ Morning Show BJ & The Q Morning Crew airs 5:30am to 10:00am AST and started simulcasting on CKEZ-FM New Glasgow, CJMO-FM Moncton and CHNI-FM Saint John January 20, 2021.

CFRQ was a sponsor of the 2009 ICF Canoe Sprint World Championships in neighboring Dartmouth. CFRQ has also sponsored the 2011 Canada Winter Games, The 2015 Ford World Men's Curling Championship and other high-profile sporting events and teams including the QMJHL's Halifax Mooseheads and NBL's Halifax Hurricanes.

In March 2024, CFRQ became the first HD Radio station broadcasting out of the Canadian Maritimes.

== Community & Charity ==
CFRQ's charitable fund, the Q104 Children's Trust Fund was established in 1993 and supports local children and their families who are in need of financial aid due to medical circumstances. Annual charitable initiatives include "The Q104 Hunger Strike" (2006–2018) assisting Feed Nova Scotia and the Q104 Thanksgiv'er, which was started in 2019. The Q104 Toy Drive also happens yearly and is in support of the Parker Street Food and Furniture Bank.

== Awards ==
- Canadian Music Awards "Station of the Year" Medium Market 2010.
- East Coast Music Award "Station of The Year" 2008 and 2009.
- 2003 New York Festivals - World Gold Medal Winner "Best Music Special" "Q104 Top Ten Weekend".
- "Best On-Air Team or Host - Medium Market," BJ & The Q Morning Crew - 2020 Broadcast Dialogue "Canadian Radio Awards".
