= Jordi Morgan =

Jordi Morgan (born September 27, 1958) is a well-known radio and television broadcaster in Nova Scotia, Canada.

Born in Moncton, New Brunswick, Morgan worked in a number of capacities for the Canadian Broadcasting Corporation (CBC) throughout the 1990s, including a stint as Halifax morning host on CBC Newsworld until 1999, when the morning programming was centralised in Toronto, Ontario.

In the 2000 federal election, Morgan stood for election to the House of Commons for the riding of Dartmouth on behalf of the Canadian Alliance. He was defeated in his efforts by the sitting Member of Parliament, New Democrat Wendy Lill.

Following the election, Morgan joined the Office of the Leader of the Opposition in Ottawa in early 2001 to provide media training to new MPs and organise events for then Opposition Leader Stockwell Day eventually acting as Caucus Liaison. He acted as Deputy Chief of Staff for interim leader John Reynolds and manager of Caucus Service for Stephen Harper.

In 2003, he joined the Atlantic Institute for Market Studies (AIMS), an economic and social policy think tank focused on Atlantic Canada, as Director of Communications and Development.

During the 2004 municipal election in the Halifax Regional Municipality, he served as campaign manager for local businessman Victor Syperek, a distant runner-up to re-elected Mayor Peter J. Kelly.

He also acted as campaign manager for Andrew House, Conservative Party of Canada candidate for Halifax in the 2005-2006 federal election and Ted Larsen in the 2008 federal election.

He worked as an organizer and was the deputy campaign manager and media spokesperson for the Progressive Conservative Party of Nova Scotia in the 2009 provincial election.

He went on to the office of the Hon. Diane Finley, Minister of HRSDC as Director of Parliamentary Affairs.

In 2010, he became the host of the talk show Maritime Morning on Halifax radio station News95.7.

On November 5, 2013, Morgan was fired from his job as host of Maritime Morning on Halifax radio station News95.7. This was part of a cost-cutting and restructuring process, where Rogers decided to let go some of its employees as well as incorporating more sports content from sportsnet 590 the fan.

In April 2014, Morgan was appointed the Atlantic vice-president for the Canadian Federation of Independent Business.
