= Brendan Maguire =

Canadian politician

The Honourable Brendan Maguire ECNS MLA

Member of the Nova Scotia House of Assembly for Halifax Atlantic
- Incumbent
- Assumed office October 8, 2013
- Preceded by: Michèle Raymond

Personal details
- Born: August 29, 1975 (age 51) Weymouth, Dorset, England
- Party: PC (2024–)
- Other political affiliations: Liberal (until 2024)

Brendan Oliver Maguire (born August 29, 1975) is a Canadian politician who was elected to the Nova Scotia House of Assembly in the 2013 provincial election. Elected as a member of the Nova Scotia Liberal Party, he joined the Progressive Conservative Party of Nova Scotia in February 2024 and became the Minister of Education and Early Childhood Development. He represents the electoral district of Halifax Atlantic.

== Early life ==
Born in Weymouth, England to parents from Northern Ireland, Maguire and his family emigrated to Canada at four years old. He and his four siblings were abandoned by their parents at the Halifax Shopping Centre shortly after that. As a result, he grew up in foster care in the Halifax area and became a Canadian citizen when he was 16.

Maguire graduated from college with a diploma in computer studies. He worked in telecommunications and later became a sales representative and technician at the Halifax Water Commission.

== Political career ==
Maguire serves on the Public Accounts Committee, the Health Committee, the Law Amendments Committee and is Vice Chair of the Community Services Committee. In 2014, 2015, and 2016, Maguire was named the Best Member of the Provincial Legislature by The Coast magazine. Maguire was also named the 2015 Ambassador of the year by Family SOS.

On February 23, 2021, Maguire was appointed to the Executive Council of Nova Scotia as Minister of Municipal Affairs.

Maguire was re-elected in the 2021 election, however the Rankin Liberals lost government becoming the Official Opposition.

On February 22, 2024, Progressive Conservative premier Tim Houston announced that Maguire had crossed the floor to the Progressive Conservatives, and that Maguire was being appointed Community Services Minister.

On December 12, 2024, Maguire was appointed Minister of Education and Early Childhood development, Minister of Advanced Education and Government House Leader.

== Electoral record ==
2024 Nova Scotia general election: Halifax Atlantic
Party	Candidate	Votes	%	±%
Progressive Conservative	Brendan Maguire	3,879	57.41	+37.84
New Democratic	Cathy Cervin	1,883	27.87	+5.06
Liberal	Phil Chisholm	911	13.48	-41.74
Green	Gadfly Stratton	84	1.24	-1.16
Total		6,757	–	
Total rejected ballots		32		
Turnout		6,789	41.24	
Eligible voters		16,464		
Progressive Conservative gain		Swing		
Source: Elections Nova Scotia

2021 Nova Scotia general election: Halifax Atlantic
Party	Candidate	Votes	%	±%	Expenditures
Liberal	Brendan Maguire	4,213	55.22	-0.26	$45,253.75
New Democratic	Shauna Hatt	1,740	22.81	+0.08	$34,341.09
Progressive Conservative	Tim Cranston	1,493	19.57	+2.47	$34,168.26
Green	Sarah Weston	183	2.40	-2.30	$200.00
Total valid votes/expense limit		7,629	99.70	–	$92,718.64
Total rejected ballots		23	0.30	-0.03	
Turnout		7,652	47.06	-2.96	
Eligible voters		16,259			
Liberal hold		Swing		-0.17	
Source: Elections Nova Scotia

2017 Nova Scotia general election
Party	Candidate	Votes	%	±%
Liberal	Brendan Maguire	4,219	55.48	+12.94%
New Democratic	Trish Keeping	1,728	22.72	-10.91%
Progressive Conservative	Bruce Holland	1,300	17.10	-6.73%
Green	Chelsey Carter	357	4.69	
Total valid votes		7,604	100.0	

2013 Nova Scotia general election
Party	Candidate	Votes	%	±%
Liberal	Brendan Maguire	3,244	42.54	
New Democratic Party	Tanis Crosby	2,564	33.63	
Progressive Conservative	Ryan Brennan	1,817	23.83	
