= Wendy Lill =

Canadian playwright (born 1950)

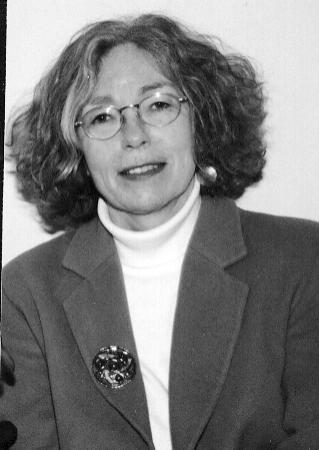

Member of Parliament for Dartmouth
- In office June 2, 1997 – June 28, 2004
- Preceded by: Ron MacDonald
- Succeeded by: Michael Savage

Personal details
- Born: November 2, 1950 (age 76) Vancouver, British Columbia, Canada
- Party: NDP
- Spouse: Richard Starr
- Profession: playwright, screenwriter, radio dramatist

Wendy Lill (born November 2, 1950) is a Canadian playwright, screenwriter and radio dramatist who served as an NDP Member of Parliament from 1997 to 2004. Her stage plays have been performed extensively in theatres across Canada as well as internationally in such countries as Scotland, Denmark and Germany.

Many of the plays explore the divide between the powerful and the oppressed, exploring, for example, the racism and abuse suffered by Canada's indigenous peoples, issues faced by people with disabilities, child sexual abuse and women's rights. Four of her plays were nominated for Governor General's Awards. Sisters, which dramatizes the human devastation caused by a convent-run, native residential school, received the Labatt's Canadian Play Award at the Newfoundland and Labrador Drama Festival. Lill's adaptation of Sisters for television earned her a Gemini Award in 1992.

Before writing her first produced play, On the Line, based on a strike by female garment workers in Manitoba, Lill worked as a journalist, documentary-maker and dramatist for CBC Radio in Winnipeg, Manitoba. Among other things, she covered a paper mill strike in Kenora, Ontario and produced documentaries for Our Native Land, a national, weekly program about Canada's indigenous peoples. Her documentary Who is George Forest? and her radio drama Shorthanded won ACTRA Awards in 1981. Her screenplay Ikwe, about Métis women, was part of a National Film Board series which received a Golden Sheaf Award at the Yorkton Film Festival in 1986.

During her seven years as a Member of Parliament, Lill served as her party's culture and communications critic as well as its advocate for human rights, children and youth, and people living with disabilities.

She was a member of the Standing Committee on Canadian Heritage where she contributed to the recommendations that resulted from three major studies: the federal government's role in supporting arts and culture; the state of the Canadian book publishing industry in an era of big-box retailers and declining independent bookstores; and, the importance of public and private broadcasting in protecting Canada's cultural sovereignty.

== Personal life and early career ==
Wendy Lill was born in Vancouver, British Columbia, the daughter of Edwin Henry Lill and Margaret Galbraith Gordon. Her family moved to London, Ontario when she was five. She received a BA in Political Science from York University in 1971. After graduation, she toured Europe, worked as a cocktail waitress and began writing poetry.

Anxious to get away from Toronto, Lill moved north to Kenora, Ontario, in 1977 where she worked as a mental health consultant. "That was a silly job for me because I had no experience and I wasn't that type of person," Lill told an interviewer later. "But I did it for six months, basically trying to ascertain whether a Canadian Mental Health Association would be useful in Northern Ontario. Well, that's sort of like saying, 'Would an aspirin be useful in Bangladesh?'" Lill concluded there were already 44 associations in Kenora, none of them effective in dealing with the socio-economic problems that resulted in alcoholism and violence.

After quitting her mental health job, Lill began working for a native newspaper, flying to remote reserves where she "spent a lot of time sleeping on floors in nursing stations." Her experiences in northwestern Ontario changed her life. "I began to see the whole level of community relationships between natives and whites in the north, and the historical abuse of power, the racism," she told a journalist in 1998. "It was the first time I had ever seen that, and I was shocked." At age 26, Lill began writing stories based on her experiences—stories that would later form the basis for her one-woman play, The Occupation of Heather Rose.

Lill also worked as a journalist for CBC Radio in Winnipeg before moving to the Manitoba capital in 1979 where she produced radio documentaries for Our Native Land, a national, CBC Radio program about Canada's indigenous peoples. One of her documentaries, Who is George Forest? won an ACTRA Award in 1981. Her radio drama, Shorthanded also won an ACTRA that same year.

In 1982, her first play, On the Line was staged in Winnipeg. It was based on a strike by immigrant women working in the garment industry and has been variously described as one-sided and propagandistic. According to one account, Lill's businessman father suggested that in successful drama, even the villains have to be real, a piece of advice that she apparently took to heart.

Lill met CBC producer, Richard Starr in Winnipeg and they married in 1982, moving east to Nova Scotia and New Brunswick before settling in Dartmouth, Nova Scotia with their sons Samuel and Joseph. Samuel has Down's syndrome and both Lill and Starr are well known for their advocacy on behalf of people living with disabilities.

== Member of Parliament ==
Lill's first formal political involvement came during the 1970s when she joined the NDP's left-wing Waffle movement. In later years, she continued to work on behalf of the NDP doing everything from door-to-door canvassing to organizing fundraising events for the party. Alexa McDonough, the party's federal leader asked Lill to run in the 1997 federal election. At the time, Lill had finished writing Corker, a play that shows how government spending cuts affect vulnerable people. "It's about the same theme I always write about," Lill told a local journalist, "the big divide between the elite and the street—and how if you don't like what's going on, you gotta change the world. I guess I decided it was time to see if I believed my own words."

Lill ran in Dartmouth, a riding that contains everything from an industrial harbourfront and urban downtown to burgeoning suburban neighbourhoods and rural villages such as Cherry Brook and the Prestons that make up the country's oldest African-Canadian community. As she knocked on doors, Lill found voters receptive. "The voters talk to me about exactly the same things the NDP have made issues in this campaign," she said, adding that people feared for their jobs and were angry at losing government services in the cutbacks imposed by the federal Liberal government. On election day, the 46-year-old Lill surprised the pundits when she won the riding by a margin of more than 2,000 votes. She was re-elected in 2000, defeating former provincial cabinet ministers, Bernie Boudreau and Tom McInnis.

In the fall of 2003, Lill announced that she would not be running in the next federal election. She revealed that she had been suffering from the effects of multiple sclerosis for the past three years.

=== Culture and rights advocate ===
During Wendy Lill's seven years in the House of Commons, the NDP took advantage of her background in the arts and her experience as a journalist appointing her as its critic for culture, communications and the media industries. She also served as the party's advocate for human rights, children and youth and, people living with disabilities.

Lill used her voice in the Commons to press the government on a wide range of social and cultural issues including homelessness, child poverty and the lack of a national housing program. She criticized the Liberals for slashing funding for the CBC, the country's main public broadcaster. She repeatedly called for stable, long-term CBC funding and an increased government commitment to financing the production of Canadian TV drama and entertainment programs. She urged the government to call an inquiry into the growing concentration of media ownership, calling it a "threat to democracy." She and her party waged a successful campaign to protect a tax credit for Canadians with severe and prolonged disabilities. Lill also helped establish a parliamentary subcommittee that regularly questioned cabinet ministers on their handling of issues affecting people living with disabilities.

== Plays ==
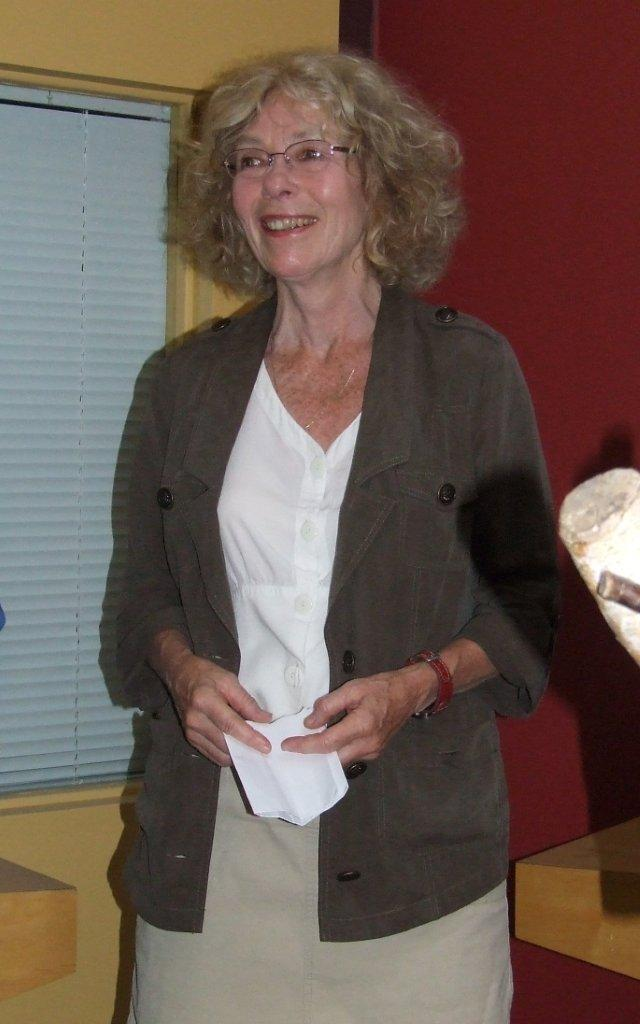
Wendy Lill in 2011

Lill wrote her first play in 1979, On the Line, while still working for the CBC in Winnipeg. The play is about the strike by immigrant garment industry women workers in Winnipeg. Her next play was The Fighting Days (1985), examining the early days of the Canadian suffrage movement. Her monodrama The Occupation of Heather Rose (1987) is based on her experience in Northern Ontario. It speaks of a young white idealistic nurse who went to work on the Snake Lake Reservation. The play was nominated for a Governor General Award. Memories of You (1989) is about the controversial life of the female artist Elizabeth Smart. It was nominated for Chalmers Canadian Play Award. Sisters (1991) follows the events revolving around the burning of a residential school by a nun who worked at the school.

All Fall Down (1994) is a story about the daycare worker who is charged with sexual abuse and all associated consequences. She created a radio drama loosely based on her experience, Backbencher, that aired on CBC Radio One in 2010. The series was renewed by CBC for another 12 episodes, and the entire 20 episode series was broadcast on Radio One and the Sirius network in 2011.

== List of plays ==
- On the Line (1979)
- The Fighting Days (1985)
- Ikwe (TV Movie, 1986)
- The Occupation of Heather Rose (1987)
- Memories of You (1989)
- Sisters (1991)
- All Fall Down (1994)
- The Glace Bay Miners' Museum (1996) (based on the novel by Sheldon Currie, which was separately adapted for the film Margaret's Museum)
- Corker (1999)
- Chimera (2007)
- Messenger (2015)

== Electoral history ==
2000 Canadian federal election: Dartmouth—Cole Harbour
Party	Candidate	Votes	%	±%
New Democratic	Wendy Lill	13,585	36.28	+3.71
Liberal	Bernie Boudreau	12,408	33.14	+5.93
Progressive Conservative	Tom McInnis	8,085	21.59	-5.32
Alliance	Jordi Morgan	3,282	8.76	-2.99
Marxist–Leninist	Charles Spurr	86	0.23	
Total valid votes		37,446	100.00	
Change for the Canadian Alliance from 1997 are based on the results of its predecessor, the Reform Party.

1997 Canadian federal election: Dartmouth—Cole Harbour
Party	Candidate	Votes	%	±%
New Democratic	Wendy Lill	12,326	32.57	+25.48
Liberal	Mike Savage	10,298	27.21	-23.60
Progressive Conservative	Rob McCleave	10,183	26.91	+3.33
Reform	John Cody	4,446	11.75	-3.87
Independent	Cliff Williams	438	1.16	-0.63
Natural Law	Claude Viau	156	0.41	-0.71
Total valid votes		37,847	100.00	
Change for Independent candidate Cliff Williams is shown based on his results as a National Party candidate in 1993.
