= Halifax Atlantic =

Provincial electoral district in Nova Scotia, Canada

Nova Scotia electoral district

Provincial electoral district
- Legislature: Nova Scotia House of Assembly
MLA
Brendan Maguire
Progressive Conservative
- District created: 1967
- First contested: 1967
- Last contested: 2024

Demographics
- Population (2011): 21,297
- Electors: 13,518
- Area (km²): 158
- Pop. density (per km²): 134.8
- Census division: Halifax Regional Municipality

Halifax Atlantic is a provincial electoral district in Nova Scotia, Canada, that elects one member of the Nova Scotia House of Assembly. The Member of the Legislative Assembly since 2013 has been Brendan Maguire of the Progressive Conservative Association of Nova Scotia.

It is located in the Halifax Regional Municipality, just south of the Halifax peninsula. It includes Spryfield, Herring Cove, Sambro, and Harrietsfield.

== Geography ==
The land area of Halifax Atlantic is 158 km^{2} (61 sq mi).

== Statistics ==
Population: 21,360 (2003)
Avg. Income: $27,570 (2003)

== Members of the Legislative Assembly ==
This riding has elected the following members of the Legislative Assembly:

Halifax Atlantic
Legislature	Years	Member	Party
Riding created from Halifax West
49th	1967–1970	John Buchanan	Progressive Conservative
50th	1970–1974	John Buchanan	Progressive Conservative
51st	1974–1978	John Buchanan	Progressive Conservative
52nd	1978–1981	John Buchanan	Progressive Conservative
53rd	1981–1984	John Buchanan	Progressive Conservative
54th	1984–1988	John Buchanan	Progressive Conservative
55th	1988–1990	John Buchanan	Progressive Conservative
55th	1991–1993	Robert Chisholm	New Democratic
56th	1993–1998	Robert Chisholm	New Democratic
57th	1998–1999	Robert Chisholm	New Democratic
58th	1999–2003	Robert Chisholm	New Democratic
59th	2003–2006	Michèle Raymond	New Democratic
60th	2006–2009	Michèle Raymond	New Democratic
61st	2009–2013	Michèle Raymond	New Democratic
62nd	2013–2017	Brendan Maguire	Liberal
63rd	2017–2021	Brendan Maguire	Liberal
64th	2021–2024	Brendan Maguire	Liberal
64th	2024–2024	Brendan Maguire	Progressive Conservative
65th	2024–present	Brendan Maguire	Progressive Conservative

== Election results ==
=== 2024 ===
2024 Nova Scotia general election
Party	Candidate	Votes	%	±%
Progressive Conservative	Brendan Maguire	3,879	57.41	+37.84
New Democratic	Cathy Cervin	1,883	27.87	+5.06
Liberal	Phil Chisholm	911	13.48	-41.74
Green	Gadfly Stratton	84	1.24	-1.16
Total		6,757	–	
Total rejected ballots		32		
Turnout		6,789	41.24	
Eligible voters		16,464		
Progressive Conservative gain		Swing		
Source: Elections Nova Scotia

=== 2021 ===
2021 Nova Scotia general election
Party	Candidate	Votes	%	±%	Expenditures
Liberal	Brendan Maguire	4,213	55.22	-0.26	$45,253.75
New Democratic	Shauna Hatt	1,740	22.81	+0.08	$34,341.09
Progressive Conservative	Tim Cranston	1,493	19.57	+2.47	$34,168.26
Green	Sarah Weston	183	2.40	-2.30	$200.00
Total valid votes/expense limit		7,629	99.70	–	$92,718.64
Total rejected ballots		23	0.30	-0.03	
Turnout		7,652	47.06	-2.96	
Eligible voters		16,259			
Liberal hold		Swing		-0.17	
Source: Elections Nova Scotia

=== 2017 ===
2017 Nova Scotia general election
Party	Candidate	Votes	%	±%
Liberal	Brendan Maguire	4,219	55.48	+12.94
New Democratic	Trish Keeping	1,728	22.72	-10.91
Progressive Conservative	Bruce Holland	1,300	17.10	-6.73
Green	Chelsey Carter	357	4.69	
Total valid votes		7,604	100	
Total rejected ballots		25	0.33	
Turnout		7,629	50.03	
Eligible voters		15,250		
Liberal hold		Swing		-1.02
Source: Elections Nova Scotia

=== 2013 ===
2013 Nova Scotia general election
Party	Candidate	Votes	%	±%
Liberal	Brendan Maguire	3,244	42.46	19.17
New Democratic	Tanis Crosby	2,579	33.76	-27.33
Progressive Conservative	Ryan Brennan	1,817	23.78	12.56
Total		7,640	–	
Source(s) Source: Nova Scotia Legislature (2024). "Electoral History for Halifax Atlantic" (PDF). nslegislature.ca. Nova Scotia, Chief Electoral Officer (2013). 39th Provincial General Election, October 8, 2013: Volume 1 – Statement of Votes & Statistics (PDF) (Report). Elections Nova Scotia. Archived from the original (PDF) on 10 April 2018.

=== 2009 ===
2009 Nova Scotia general election
Party	Candidate	Votes	%	±%
New Democratic	Michèle Raymond	5,253	61.09	11.87
Liberal	Jim Hoskins	2,003	23.29	8.08
Progressive Conservative	Brian Phillips	965	11.22	-20.73
Green	Anthony Rosborough	378	4.40	0.78
Total		8,599	–	
Source(s) Source: Nova Scotia Legislature (2024). "Electoral History for Halifax Atlantic" (PDF). nslegislature.ca.

=== 2006 ===
2006 Nova Scotia general election
Party	Candidate	Votes	%	±%
New Democratic	Michèle Raymond	4,144	49.22	11.82
Progressive Conservative	Bruce Cooke	2,690	31.95	-1.73
Liberal	Jim Hoskins	1,281	15.22	-11.56
Green	Rebecca Mosher	304	3.61	–
Total		8,419	–	
Source(s) Source: Nova Scotia Legislature (2024). "Electoral History for Halifax Atlantic" (PDF). nslegislature.ca.

=== 2003 ===
2003 Nova Scotia general election
Party	Candidate	Votes	%	±%
New Democratic	Michèle Raymond	3,327	37.40	-10.97
Progressive Conservative	Linda Mosher	2,996	33.68	2.00
Liberal	Ian McKinnon	2,382	26.78	10.25
Nova Scotia Party	Gerald Rodgers	191	2.15	-0.51
Total		8,896	–	
Source(s) Source: Nova Scotia Legislature (2024). "Electoral History for Halifax Atlantic" (PDF). nslegislature.ca.

=== 1999 ===
1999 Nova Scotia general election
Party	Candidate	Votes	%	±%
New Democratic	Robert Chisholm	4,266	48.37	-7.42
Progressive Conservative	Bruce Cooke	2,794	31.68	17.74
Liberal	David Melnick	1,458	16.53	-12.78
Nova Scotia Party	Gerald Rogers	234	2.65	–
Independent	Golda Redden	68	0.77	-0.20
Total		8,820	–	
Source(s) Source: Nova Scotia Legislature (2024). "Electoral History for Halifax Atlantic" (PDF). nslegislature.ca. Nova Scotia, Chief Electoral Officer (1999). Returns of the General Election for the House of Assembly, Thirty-Fifth General Election (Report). Elections Nova Scotia.

=== 1998 ===
1998 Nova Scotia general election
Party	Candidate	Votes	%	±%
New Democratic	Robert Chisholm	5,364	55.79	18.28
Liberal	Darren Watts	2,818	29.31	-8.03
Progressive Conservative	Jeff Campbell	1,340	13.94	-11.22
Independent	Golda Redden	93	0.97	–
Total		9,615	–	
Source(s) Source: Nova Scotia Legislature (2024). "Electoral History for Halifax Atlantic" (PDF). nslegislature.ca.

=== 1993 ===
1993 Nova Scotia general election
Party	Candidate	Votes	%	±%
New Democratic	Robert Chisholm	4,071	37.50	-1.79
Liberal	Randy Ball	4,053	37.34	2.43
Progressive Conservative	Kevin Umlah	2,731	25.16	0.58
Total		10,855	–	
Source(s) Source: Nova Scotia Legislature (2024). "Electoral History for Halifax Atlantic" (PDF). nslegislature.ca. Nova Scotia, Chief Electoral Officer (1993). Returns of the General Election for the House of Assembly, Thirty-Third General Election (PDF) (Report). Queen's Printer. Archived from the original (PDF) on 18 June 2018.

=== 1991 ===
Nova Scotia provincial by-election, 1991-08-27
Party	Candidate	Votes	%	±%
New Democratic	Robert Chisholm	4,507	39.30	21.58
Liberal	Randy Ball	4,003	34.90	10.13
Progressive Conservative	Judy Hartlin	2,819	24.58	-31.75
Independent	Arthur Canning	140	1.22	0.53
Total		11,469	–	
Source(s) Source: Nova Scotia Legislature (2024). "Electoral History for Halifax Atlantic" (PDF). nslegislature.ca.

=== 1988 ===
1988 Nova Scotia general election
Party	Candidate	Votes	%	±%
Progressive Conservative	John Buchanan	6,284	56.33	-2.03
Liberal	Doug Adams	2,763	24.77	4.83
New Democratic	Rene Quigley	1,976	17.71	-2.79
Independent	Arthur Canning	77	0.69	-0.50
Independent	Emanuel Jannasch	55	0.49	–
Total		11,155	–	
Source(s) Source: Nova Scotia Legislature (2024). "Electoral History for Halifax Atlantic" (PDF). nslegislature.ca. Nova Scotia, Chief Electoral Officer (1988). Returns of the General Election for the House of Assembly, Thirty-Second General Election (PDF) (Report). Queen's Printer. Archived from the original (PDF) on 7 July 2018.

=== 1984 ===
1984 Nova Scotia general election
Party	Candidate	Votes	%	±%
Progressive Conservative	John Buchanan	5,528	58.37	-1.92
New Democratic	Rene Quigley	1,942	20.50	-0.60
Liberal	David Melnick	1,888	19.93	2.48
Independent	Arthur Canning	113	1.19	0.04
Total		9,471	–	
Source(s) Source: Nova Scotia Legislature (2024). "Electoral History for Halifax Atlantic" (PDF). nslegislature.ca. Nova Scotia, Chief Electoral Officer (1984). Returns of the General Election for the House of Assembly, Thirty-First General Election (PDF) (Report). Queen's Printer. Archived from the original (PDF) on 31 July 2017.

=== 1981 ===
1981 Nova Scotia general election
Party	Candidate	Votes	%	±%
Progressive Conservative	John Buchanan	6,023	60.29	-3.84
New Democratic	Rene Quigley	2,108	21.10	8.78
Liberal	Roma J. Aiken	1,744	17.46	-4.82
Independent	Arthur Canning	115	1.15	-0.12
Total		9,990	–	
Source(s) Source: Nova Scotia Legislature (2024). "Electoral History for Halifax Atlantic" (PDF). nslegislature.ca. Nova Scotia, Chief Electoral Officer (1981). Returns of the General Election for the House of Assembly, Thirtieth General Election (PDF) (Report). Queen's Printer. Archived from the original (PDF) on 31 July 2017.

=== 1978 ===
1978 Nova Scotia general election
Party	Candidate	Votes	%	±%
Progressive Conservative	John Buchanan	6,628	64.13	13.07
Liberal	Jerry F. Blom	2,303	22.28	-13.62
New Democratic	Susan Holtz	1,274	12.33	-0.72
Independent	Arthur Canning	131	1.27	–
Total		10,336	–	
Source(s) Source: Nova Scotia Legislature (2024). "Electoral History for Halifax Atlantic" (PDF). nslegislature.ca. Nova Scotia, Chief Electoral Officer (1978). Returns of the General Election for the House of Assembly, Twenty-Ninth General Election (PDF) (Report). Queen's Printer. Archived from the original (PDF) on 18 June 2018.

=== 1974 ===
1974 Nova Scotia general election
Party	Candidate	Votes	%	±%
Progressive Conservative	John Buchanan	6,229	51.06	-3.60
Liberal	Darrell E. Wentzell	4,380	35.90	-3.26
New Democratic	Colin Campbell	1,591	13.04	6.87
Total		12,200	–	
Source(s) Source: Nova Scotia Legislature (2024). "Electoral History for Halifax Atlantic" (PDF). nslegislature.ca. Nova Scotia, Chief Electoral Officer (1974). Returns of the General Election for the House of Assembly, Twenty-Eighth General Election (PDF) (Report). Queen's Printer. Archived from the original (PDF) on 18 June 2018.

=== 1970 ===
1970 Nova Scotia general election
Party	Candidate	Votes	%	±%
Progressive Conservative	John Buchanan	5,284	54.66	0.92
Liberal	Bob Hayes	3,786	39.16	-3.23
New Democratic	Charles Grineault	597	6.18	2.31
Total		9,667	–	
Source(s) Source: Nova Scotia Legislature (2024). "Electoral History for Halifax Atlantic" (PDF). nslegislature.ca. Nova Scotia, Legislative Assembly (1970). Returns of the General Election for the House of Assembly, 1970 (PDF) (Report). Queen's Printer. Archived from the original (PDF) on 25 July 2018.

=== 1967 ===
1967 Nova Scotia general election
Party	Candidate	Votes	%	±%
Progressive Conservative	John Buchanan	4,507	53.74	–
Liberal	Percy Baker	3,556	42.40	–
New Democratic	Charles Grineault	324	3.86	–
Total		8,387	–	
Source(s) Source: Nova Scotia Legislature (2024). "Electoral History for Halifax Atlantic" (PDF). nslegislature.ca. Nova Scotia Legislature (1967). Returns of the General Election for the House of Assembly (PDF) (Report). Queen's Printer. Archived from the original (PDF) on 25 July 2018.

== See also ==
- List of Nova Scotia provincial electoral districts
- Canadian provincial electoral districts
