= Cole Harbour 30 =

Mi'kmaq reserve in Nova Scotia, Canada

Coordinates: 44°39′00″N 63°28′58″W

Cole Harbour 30 in Nova Scotia

Cole Harbour 30 is a Mi'kmaq reserve located in Nova Scotia, Canada, in the Halifax Regional Municipality.

It is administratively part of the Millbrook First Nation.
