= Danny Finkleman =

Canadian journalist and radio host (born 1942)

- Born: 1942 (age 83–84); Winnipeg, Manitoba, Canada
- Occupations: Journalist, radio personality

Danny Finkleman (born 1942) is a Canadian journalist and radio host, best known for his work on CBC Radio. He was host of Finkleman's 45s from 1985 until 2005, when he retired from CBC. He also co-hosted a weekday national CBC radio program called Dayshift for one season, in 1986-87. From October 12, 2013, to July 1, 2014 he hosted a weekly podcast.

Finkleman began working at CBC in 1967 after completing a degree in law at the University of Manitoba. He hosted a show called Danny Finkleman's Saturday Morning Show from 1972 to 1979. He also worked for This Country in the Morning, preparing three seven-minute segments a week, and subsequently created and produced the nightly series Variety Tonight in the early 1980s.

He was probably best known for Finkleman's 45s. The show played music from the 1950s, 60s, and early 70s and was noted for Danny's rants about the modern world, including topics such as modern music and computers. Finkleman was generally opposed to both. In general the show was quite informal. The show's playlist was noted for its fairly wide selection of music from the period. Danny often played less famous songs than commercial "oldies" shows were able to. Favourite groups included the Shirelles, the Diamonds, Patti LaBelle, the Four Preps, the Box Tops, Gladys Knight & the Pips, Georgie Fame and the True Blues, The Crew-Cuts, Paul Anka, Otis Redding and Dusty Springfield. Finkleman disliked the Rolling Stones and partly blamed them, among many others, for the decline of music in the 1970s. According to Finkleman, the show's title was loosely based on the name of Gilmour's Albums, a popular variety show on CBC at the time Finkleman's show was conceived.

One of Finkleman's central ideas was that the politicization of music in the mid-1970s ruined music, making it "mean spirited", "pretentious" and "ugly". Among other bands that took a turn for the worse, according to Finkleman, were the Beatles. He thinks that the Beatles lost their touch after Sgt. Pepper's Lonely Hearts Club Band, and the Beach Boys after "Good Vibrations". Another feature of Danny's character on the show was his opposition to e-mail. He never accepted e-mail for the show because he said it was too distracting and was too much work.

Since 1993 Finkleman had worked only part-time at the CBC; he was also a stockbroker at Canaccord Capital in Toronto. His brother, Ken Finkleman, is also a well-known Canadian media personality.
