= CKEZ-FM =

Radio station in New Glasgow, Nova Scotia

Coordinates: 45.54°N 62.95°W

- New Glasgow, Nova Scotia; Canada
- Broadcast area: Pictou County
- Frequency: 97.9 MHz
- Branding: Q97.9

Programming
- Format: Classic/Active rock

Ownership
- Owner: Stingray Group
- Sister stations: CKEC-FM

History
- First air date: September 15, 2014

Technical information
- Power: 100 kW

Links
- Website: q979.ca

CKEZ-FM is a Canadian radio station broadcasting at 97.9 FM in New Glasgow, Nova Scotia. The station airs a classic/active rock format branded as Q97.9. The station is owned by the Stingray Group which also owns sister station CKEC-FM.

== History ==
On May 9, 2012, Hector Broadcasting Company received a licence from the Canadian Radio-television and Telecommunications Commission (CRTC) to operate a new English language FM radio station in New Glasgow/Pictou County. The station began broadcasting on September 15, 2014, as Classic Rock 97.9. In November 2017, it was announced that pending approval by the CRTC, this station and its sister CKEC were to be purchased by Newcap Radio, and was included in the sale of Newcap stations to Stingray Group.

On January 15, 2021, the station rebranded as Q97.9, as part of a merger of branding and programming with Halifax sister station CFRQ-FM.
