= Arnie Patterson =

Canadian journalist, public relations professional and broadcaster

Charles Arnold "Arnie" Patterson (2 July 1928 – 9 March 2011) was a Canadian journalist, public relations professional and broadcaster.

Born in Dartmouth, Nova Scotia, Canada, Patterson began his career after university as a reporter for The Chronicle Herald and Mail-Star newspapers in Halifax before moving to Toronto, joining the Toronto Telegram in 1954. Patterson was public relations director for Dominion Steel and Coal Corporation of Sydney, Nova Scotia on 23 October 1958 when a massive bump hit Colliery #2 in the coal mining town of Springhill, trapping 174 miners and killing 75. Patterson spent a month in the town, relaying information to the miners' families and to the 150 reporters who had made their way to Springhill to cover the disaster which had garnered worldwide attention. He was named Canada's public relations man of the year for his work during the tragedy.

In 1961 he applied to the Board of Broadcast Governors and was granted a radio station broadcasting licence. As Patterson Broadcasters, he launched easy listening CFDR at 790 on the AM dial on 5 December 1962 from the facility located at 66 Ochterloney Street. Later he was granted a broadcasting licence for CFRQ (Q104-FM), a rock radio station in 1983.

Patterson was inducted into the Nova Scotia Sport Hall of Fame as a builder for his broadcasting/media work in 2008.

He was press secretary to Prime Minister of Canada Pierre Trudeau during the 1979 federal election, and was a general manager of Moosehead Breweries of Dartmouth.

Patterson died on 9 March 2011 at the age of 82.
