= Gilmour's Albums =

Former CBC Radio Show 1956-1997

Gilmour's Albums was one of the longest-running radio shows on CBC Radio, and was hosted by former newspaper reporter Clyde Gilmour.

The show started in 1956, and its format consisted of selections of music, hand-picked by Gilmour, many from his own vast personal record collection. The show, which was an hour long, defined the eclectic format, with a mix of opera, chamber music, show tunes, and jazz, and often concluded with a humorous musical number or comedy sketch. Every genre save rock and roll was played on his show.

Known for Gilmour's trademark Hello! and closing of So long for now, it was CBC's highest-rated music broadcast, with a steady listenership of over half a million listeners tuning in to CBC Stereo on Saturdays, and to CBC Radio on Sundays at noon. His show was succeeded by The Vinyl Cafe in his timeslot.

The show ran 52 weeks a year with no repeats for over 40 years when the host retired in June 1997. Gilmour died shortly thereafter, and his entire collection of over 10,000 albums and 4,000 CDs was donated to the CBC's music library.

The intro theme music was Akinla, the final movement of the African Suite by Nigerian composer Fela Sowande.

The extro theme for the first 2 decades was Pavane (Op. 50) by Gabriel Fauré but arranged by Almeida for flute, voice and guitar. The version played on Gilmour's albums first appeared on the LP For My True Love and was performed by mezzo-soprano Salli Terri, guitarist Laurindo Almeida and flautist Martin Ruderman. It is now available on Duets With Spanish Guitar, Volume 2, Capitol Records.

The extro theme for the final decade was "Saturday Night Function" by Barney Bigard and Duke Ellington performed by the Sackville All Stars, from their album also titled Saturday Night Function.

== Discography ==
- Gilmour's Album: All Time Favourites, A Silver Jubilee Anthology (1981)
- Gilmour's 2nd Album - More All Time Favorites - from Cut Out Limbo (1982)
- Gilmour's Albums Volume I (1997)
- Gilmour's Album, Volume II (2000)
