= CHNI-FM =

Radio station in Saint John, New Brunswick

Coordinates: 45°16′23.2″N 66°3′50″W

- Saint John, New Brunswick; Canada
- Frequency: 88.9 MHz
- Branding: Q88.9

Programming
- Format: Classic/Active rock

Ownership
- Owner: Stingray Group

History
- First air date: October 11, 2005
- Call sign meaning: News and Information, from original format

Technical information
- ERP: 12,500 watts (25,000 watts maximum)
- HAAT: 414 metres (1,358 ft)

Links
- Website: q889.ca

CHNI-FM (88.9 MHz) is a Canadian FM radio station in Saint John, New Brunswick. The station airs a classic/active rock format branded as Q88.9. It is owned by the Stingray Group.

== History ==
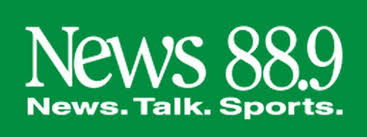
Logo as News 88.9, used from 2005–2009

On November 26, 2004, Rogers Media received CRTC approval to operate a new English-language commercial FM News/Talk radio station which would broadcast at 88.9 FM in Saint John, New Brunswick as well as other News/talk stations in Halifax and Moncton under licensing agreement, the CRTC officially approved the application. On October 11, 2005, CHNI signed on as News 88.9 under the ownership of Rogers Media, as part of a three-station news/talk network comprising CHNI, CKNI-FM in Moncton (which has since been sold to Acadia Broadcasting and flipped to an AC format in August 2014), and CJNI-FM in Halifax (which shut down in July 2026). As CHNI, the station would also broadcast Saint John Sea Dogs, Ottawa Senators and Toronto Blue Jays games, along with programming from ESPN Radio and Westwood One.

On July 4, 2013, Newcap Radio announced that it would acquire CHNI from Rogers Media pending CRTC approval, marking the company's entry into the Saint John market. The acquisition, along with a request by Newcap to allow CHNI-FM to switch from a news/talk format to a music format, was approved by the CRTC on March 14, 2014. The acquisition closed on March 31, 2014. Six CHNI employees laid off as part of the sale sued both Rogers and Newcap, alleging they were assured that no employees would be laid off.

Logo as Rock 88.9, used from 2014–2019

On July 28, 2014, CHNI flipped to mainstream rock branded as Rock 88.9, with 30 days of commercial-free music as the station began to hire on-air talent. David Newbury, general manager for Newcap Radio in Atlantic Canada stated that the company felt there was a "void" in the Saint John market that needed to be filled, and noted that Newcap was hoping CHNI would emulate the success of its sister stations in other Atlantic Canadian markets.

On August 19, 2019, CHNI rebranded as Q88.9, while keeping the same slogan "The Rock of Saint John".
