= Mick Dalla-Vee =

Canadian rock musician

Mick Dalla-Vee is a Canadian singer, songwriter, producer, engineer, and multi-instrumentalist.

== Career ==
He moved to Western Canada after leaving Bawating High School from Sault Ste. Marie, Ontario, with the band Shama. Shama toured Western Canada and was managed by Bruce Allen (Bryan Adams, Martina McBride) before disbanding. He became the lead guitarist of Trama, managed by Sam Feldman (Joni Mitchell, Diana Krall), then played bass for the Paradox, which evolved into Cease & Desist. Cease & Desist was described as "one of Vancouver's most popular club bands" by the rock critic of The Province.

He played the part of John in a Beatles cover band, Revolver, that was put together for Expo 86, and played occasionally throughout the subsequent decade.

=== Songwriting ===
Mick has written or co-written many songs on albums for artists as diverse as country music's Brent Howard and Canada's Singing Cowgirl: Marilyn Faye Parney, the heavy rock of Blackstone, soul/R&B for 'j.c. neill', Belinda Metz and Emily Jordan. He wrote for smooth jazz singer Lori Paul. He co-wrote ten of the eleven songs on Paul's album Vanity Press. His first country song 'The Wrangler' reached the country top 30 charts across Canada. It also appeared on C.M.T., Canada's country music video channel. One of the songs from Mick's A Whistler Christmas album entitled, 'All I Want is You at Christmastime' was recorded by country star Brent Howard. He has written for movies, television, videos, video games and promotional spots.

=== Producing ===
Aside from producing himself, he operates his own studio 'Millennia Sound Design', producing and engineering for artists like: Randy Bachman, Emily Jordan, j.c. neill, Lori Paul, and Hello Beautiful. He has contracts with The National Braille Factory, and has provided theme music and soundscapes for two network television series and Simon Fraser University. Randy Bachman's release Jazzthing had some work done on it at Millennia Sound Design.

=== Vocals ===
Dalla-Vee can adopt a variety of voice in his singing. This allowed him to contribute to projects including the Mötley Crüe album A Decade of Decadence, Brent Howard and Southern Cherry and Colin Arthur Wiebe. Trooper and The Powder Blues Band have used Mick's voice for recordings. He has worked extensively as a studio session singer/musician. He appeared on a worldwide Karaoke album package. He has sung commercial jingles for radio and television.

=== Performance ===
He plays guitar, bass and keyboards with his main band, Cease and Desist, e.g., in its show "Atlantic Crossing". He is the bass player/vocalist with Randy Bachman's band.

Bachman's 2003 - 2007 foray in the jazz world with Jazz Thing (1 & 2) featured Dalla-Vee on the string bass and vocals.

He plays mandolin, banjo, acoustic guitars and harmonica in the Brent Howard and Southern Cherry band, and has toured as John Lennon in Revolver - The Worlds Best Beatles Show. Mick also appears as Elton John in Elton and Billy: Live.

Dalla-Vee played keyboards with Melanie Fiona.

== Recognition ==
- Gold Record for his work on the Trooper album Last of the Gypsies (1991)
- Gold Status and Platinum status award (2011-2012 ) for Bachman & Turner Live at The Roseland Ballroom in New York City
- Platinum status award for Randy Bachman's Vinyl Tap
- Saskatchewan Album of the Year Award (1997) for his songwriting/musician contributions to an album with proceeds going to people affected with multiple sclerosis.

== Affiliations ==
A longtime member of the Canadian Academy of Recording Arts and Sciences, he sat as a judge for Canada's Juno Awards (Canada's Version of The Grammy's). He was on the board of directors of the Pacific Music Industry Association for 3 years, and chairs the Carolyn Foundation Musician's Assistance Society; a non-profit organization he and colleagues set-up in the wake of his daughter Carolyn's sudden death in November 1999.
