= Robert Plant discography =

Discography of English singer Robert Plant

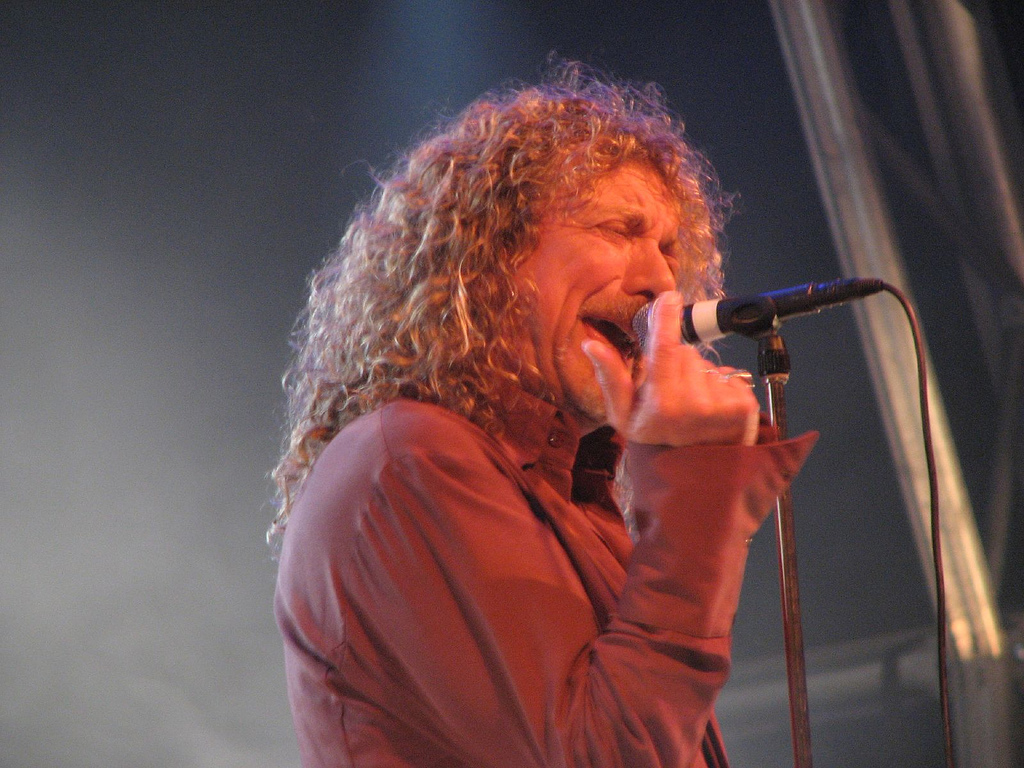
- Plant performing at the 2007 Green Man Festival
- Studio albums: 12
- Extended plays: 1
- Live albums: 1
- Compilation albums: 2
- Singles: 44
- Video albums: 3
- Music videos: 22
- Collaborative albums: 3

After the breakup of Led Zeppelin in 1980 (following the death of drummer John Bonham), Robert Plant pursued a successful solo career comprising twelve studio albums, one live album, two compilation albums, three collaborative albums, one extended play, 44 singles, three video albums and 22 music videos. He began his solo career with Pictures at Eleven in 1982, followed by 1983's The Principle of Moments. Popular tracks from this period include "Big Log" (a Top 20 hit in 1983), "In the Mood" (1984), "Little by Little" (from 1985's Shaken 'n' Stirred), "Tall Cool One" (a No. 25 hit off 1988's Now and Zen), Manic Nirvana's "Hurting Kind (I've Got My Eyes on You)" (1990), and "I Believe" (from 1993's Fate of Nations), another song written for and dedicated to his late son, Karac. In 1984, Plant formed a short-lived all-star group with Jimmy Page and Jeff Beck called the Honeydrippers, who had a No. 3 hit with a remake of the Phil Phillips' tune, "Sea of Love" and a follow-up hit with a cover of Roy Brown's "Rockin' at Midnight". Although Plant avoided performing Led Zeppelin songs through much of this period, his tours in 1983 (with drummer Phil Collins) and 1985 were very successful, often performing to sold-out arena-sized venues.

In 2007, Plant collaborated with bluegrass and country music artist Alison Krauss. They released the critically accepted Raising Sand on 23 October 2007, via Krauss' record label, Rounder Records. The album proved to be a success, debuting at No. 2 on the all-genre Billboard 200 and No. 2 on the Top Country Albums chart. It was an international success as well, being certified Platinum in many countries. In 2008, the album's first single, "Gone, Gone, Gone (Done Moved On)", won the Grammy Award for Best Pop Collaboration with Vocals at the 50th Grammy Awards. At the 51st Grammy Awards, the album won all five categories in which it was nominated – Album of the Year, Best Contemporary Folk Album, Record of the Year (for "Please Read the Letter"), Best Pop Collaboration with Vocals (for "Rich Woman"), and the Grammy Award for Best Country Collaboration with Vocals (for "Killing the Blues").

== Albums ==
=== Studio albums ===
Year	Album details	Peak chart positions										Certifications (sales threshold)
Year	Album details	UK	AUS	CAN	GER	NLD	NOR	NZ	SWE	SWI	US	Certifications (sales threshold)
1982	Pictures at Eleven: Release date: 28 June 1982; Label: Swan Song	2	6	1	49	—	17	16	32	—	5	BPI: Silver; ARIA: Gold; MC: Platinum; RIAA: Platinum
1983	The Principle of Moments: Release date: 15 July 1983; Label: Atlantic	7	10	6	51	3	—	1	41	—	8	BPI: Gold; ARIA: Gold; RIAA: Platinum
1985	Shaken 'n' Stirred: Release date: 20 May 1985; Label: Es Paranza	19	28	26	57	45	—	31	33	—	20	RIAA: Gold
1988	Now and Zen: Release date: 29 February 1988; Label: Es Paranza	10	11	4	48	31	12	7	18	—	6	BPI: Gold; RIAA: 3× Platinum
1990	Manic Nirvana: Release date: 19 March 1990; Label: Es Paranza	15	26	11	30	78	—	24	—	—	12	BPI: Silver; MC: Platinum; RIAA: Gold
1993	Fate of Nations: Release date: 24 May 1993; Label: Es Paranza	6	37	12	56	38	—	10	19	32	34	BPI: Silver; MC: Gold; RIAA: Gold
2002	Dreamland (with the Strange Sensation): Release date: 16 July 2002; Label: Mercury	20	—	—	19	—	26	—	52	74	40	
2005	Mighty ReArranger (with the Strange Sensation): Release date: 25 April 2005; Label: Sanctuary	4	51	—	25	67	10	27	13	47	22	BPI: Silver
2010	Band of Joy (with the Band of Joy): Release date: 14 September 2010; Label: Rounder	3	18	7	13	37	2	6	6	13	5	BPI: Gold; IFPI NOR: Gold
2014	Lullaby and... The Ceaseless Roar (with the Sensational Space Shifters): Release date: 9 September 2014; Label: Nonesuch	2	22	6	10	15	2	7	6	6	10	BPI: Gold
2017	Carry Fire (with the Sensational Space Shifters): Release date: 13 October 2017; Label: Nonesuch	3	16	12	10	29	9	7	12	7	14	BPI: Silver
2025	Saving Grace (with Suzi Dian): Release date: 26 September 2025; Label: Nonesuch	4	33	—	12	44	89	33	33	3	—	

=== Live album ===
Year	Album details
2012	Robert Plant presents: Sensational Space Shifters (Live in London July '12): Released: 13 July 2012; Format: Digital download

=== Collaborative albums ===
==== Studio ====
Year	Album details	Peak chart positions										Certifications (sales threshold)
Year	Album details	UK	AUS	CAN	GER	NLD	NOR	NZ	SWE	SWI	US	Certifications (sales threshold)
1998	Walking into Clarksdale: With Jimmy Page (as Page and Plant); Release date: 21 April 1998; Label: Atlantic	3	16	17	13	56	13	11	17	31	8	BPI: Silver; RIAA: Gold
2007	Raising Sand: With Alison Krauss; Release date: 23 October 2007; Label: Rounder	2	45	—	28	26	1	3	2	33	2	BPI: Platinum; MC: Platinum; RIAA: Platinum
2021	Raise the Roof: With Alison Krauss; Release date: 19 November 2021; Label: Rounder	5	18	16	14	15	3	7	9	7	7	BPI: Silver
"—" denotes releases that did not chart

==== Live ====
Year	Album details	Peak chart positions									Certifications (sales threshold)
Year	Album details	UK	AUS	CAN	GER	NLD	NZ	SWE	SWI	US	Certifications (sales threshold)
1994	No Quarter: With Jimmy Page (as Page and Plant); Release date: 7 November 1994; Label: Atlantic	7	2	3	18	33	13	10	16	4	ARIA: Gold; BPI: Gold; MC: 2× Platinum; RIAA: Platinum

=== Compilations ===
==== Albums ====
Year	Album details	Peak chart positions		Certifications (sales threshold)
Year	Album details	UK	US	Certifications (sales threshold)
2003	Sixty Six to Timbuktu: Release date: 4 November 2003; Label: Atlantic	27	134	BPI: Silver
2020	Digging Deep: Subterranea: Release date: 2 October 2020; Label: Rhino	33	—	
"—" denotes releases that did not chart

==== Box sets ====
Year	Album details
2006	Nine Lives: Release date: 21 November 2006; Label: Es Paranza/Rhino/Atlantic
2019	Digging Deep: Release date: 13 December 2019; Label: Rhino

== EP ==
- More Roar (2015, live)

== Singles ==
=== Solo singles and other charted songs ===
Year	Single	Peak chart positions									Album
Year	Single	UK	AUS	CAN	NLD	NZ	SWE	US	US Main	US AAA	Album
1967	"Our Song"	—	—	—	—	—	—	—	—	—	Non-album singles
1967	"Long Time Coming"	—	—	—	—	—	—	—	—	—	Non-album singles
1982	"Burning Down One Side"	73	96	11	—	—	—	64	3	—	Pictures at Eleven
1982	"Worse Than Detroit" [airplay]	—	—	—	—	—	—	—	10	—	Pictures at Eleven
1982	"Pledge Pin"	—	—	—	—	—	—	74	11	—	Pictures at Eleven
1982	"Slow Dancer" [airplay]	—	—	—	—	—	—	—	19	—	Pictures at Eleven
1983	"Big Log" b/w "Far Post"	11 —	23 —	23 —	5 —	7 —	— —	20 —	6; 12	—	The Principle of Moments
1983	"Other Arms"	—	—	—	—	—	—	—	1	—	The Principle of Moments
1983	"In the Mood" b/w "Horizontal Departure"	81 —	37 —	— —	— —	24 —	— —	39 —	4; 44	—	The Principle of Moments
1984	"Sea of Love"	56	5	1	—	12	—	3	11	—	The Honeydrippers: Volume One (as the Honeydrippers)
1985	"Rockin' at Midnight"	—	—	18	—	—	—	26	8	—	The Honeydrippers: Volume One (as the Honeydrippers)
1985	"Little by Little"	83	83	—	—	28	—	36	1	—	Shaken 'n' Stirred
1985	"Pink and Black"	95	—	—	—	—	—	—	—	—	Shaken 'n' Stirred
1985	"Sixes and Sevens" [airplay]	—	—	—	—	—	—	—	18	—	Shaken 'n' Stirred
1985	"Too Loud"	—	—	—	—	—	—	108	—	—	Shaken 'n' Stirred
1988	"Heaven Knows"	33	32	65	—	19	—	—	1	—	Now and Zen
1988	"Tall Cool One"	87	46	—	—	22	—	25	1	—	Now and Zen
1988	"Dance on My Own" [US promo]	—	—	—	—	—	—	—	10	—	Now and Zen
1988	"Ship of Fools"	76	—	—	—	10	—	84	3	—	Now and Zen
1988	"The Way I Feel" [US promo]	—	—	—	—	—	—	—	46	—	Now and Zen
1988	"Walking Towards Paradise" [promo]	—	—	—	—	—	—	—	39	—	Now and Zen
1990	"Hurting Kind (I've Got My Eyes on You)" b/w "I Cried"	45 —	63 —	14 —	— —	39 —	— —	46 —	1; 39	—	Manic Nirvana
1990	"Tie Dye on the Highway" [promo]	—	—	—	—	—	—	—	6	—	Manic Nirvana
1990	"Big Love" [airplay]	—	—	—	—	—	—	—	35	—	Manic Nirvana
1990	"Your Ma Said You Cried in Your Sleep Last Night"	90	—	71	—	—	—	—	8	—	Manic Nirvana
1993	"I Believe"	64	—	37	—	15	—	—	9	—	Fate of Nations
1993	"If I Were a Carpenter"	63	—	50	—	—	—	—	—	—	Fate of Nations
1993	"Calling to You"	80	—	47	—	—	—	—	3	—	Fate of Nations
1993	"29 Palms"	21	79	11	—	20	28	111	4	—	Fate of Nations
2002	"Darkness, Darkness" [promo]	—	—	—	—	—	—	—	27	—	Dreamland
2002	"Song to the Siren EP"	84	—	—	—	—	—	—	—	—	Dreamland
2003	"Last Time I Saw Her"	84	—	—	—	—	—	—	—	—	Dreamland
2005	"Shine It All Around"	32	—	—	—	20	—	—	18	11	Mighty ReArranger
2005	"The Enchanter"	—	—	—	—	—	—	—	—	—	Mighty ReArranger
2010	"Angel Dance"	133	—	—	—	—	—	—	—	1	Band of Joy
2010	"House of Cards"	—	—	—	—	—	—	—	—	—	Band of Joy
2010	"You Can't Buy My Love"	—	—	—	—	—	—	—	—	13	Band of Joy
2011	"Harm's Swift Way"	—	—	—	—	—	—	—	—	—	Band of Joy
2014	"Rainbow"	—	—	—	—	—	—	—	—	8	Lullaby and... The Ceaseless Roar
2017	"Bones of Saints"	—	—	—	—	—	—	—	—	20	Carry Fire
2025	"Everybody's Song"	—	—	—	—	—	—	—	—	—	Saving Grace
2025	"Gospel Plough"	—	—	—	—	—	—	—	—	—	Saving Grace
"—" denotes releases that did not chart

=== Collaboration singles with Jimmy Page ===
Year	Single	Peak chart positions				Album
Year	Single	UK	AUS	FRA	US Main	Album
1994	"Gallows Pole" (live)	35	46	50	2	No Quarter: Jimmy Page and Robert Plant Unledded
1994	"Thank You" (live)	—	—	—	8	No Quarter: Jimmy Page and Robert Plant Unledded
1995	"Wonderful One" (live)	—	—	—	—	No Quarter: Jimmy Page and Robert Plant Unledded
1998	"Most High"	26	88	—	1	Walking into Clarksdale
1998	"Shining in the Light"	—	—	—	6	Walking into Clarksdale
"—" denotes releases that did not chart

=== Collaboration singles with Alison Krauss ===
Year	Single	Peak chart positions			Album
Year	Single	UK	US Bub.	US AAA	Album
2007	"Gone, Gone, Gone (Done Moved On)"	109	—	2	Raising Sand
2008	"Please Read the Letter"	102	20	22	Raising Sand
2008	"Rich Woman"	—	18	—	Raising Sand
2015	"The Light of Christmas Day"	—	—	—	Non-album single
2021	"Can't Let Go"	—	—	8	Raise the Roof
"—" denotes releases that did not chart

== Other appearances ==
Year	Song	Album
1990	"Let's Have a Party"	The Last Temptation of Elvis
1993	"Louie, Louie"	Wayne's World 2
1994	"If It's Really Got to Be This Way"	Adios Amigo: A Tribute to Arthur Alexander
1995	"Down by the Seaside" (with Tori Amos)	Encomium: A Tribute to Led Zeppelin
1997	"Rude World" (with Jimmy Page)	The Inner Flame: A Rainer Ptacek Tribute
2001	"My Bucket's Got a Hole in It" (with Jimmy Page)	Good Rockin' Tonight: The Legacy of Sun Records
2007	"It Keeps Rainin'" (with Lil' Band o' Gold") and "Valley of Tears" (with the Soweto Gospel Choir)	Goin' Home: A Tribute to Fats Domino
2016	"The Blanket of Night"	The Long Road

== Videography ==
=== Video albums ===
Year	Video details	Certifications
1988	Mumbo Jumbo: Released: 30 May 1988; Studio: Atlantic; Format: VHS	RIAA: Gold
2006	Soundstage: Robert Plant and the Strange Sensation: Released: October 2006; Studio: Zoë; Format: DVD	
2012	Robert Plant & The Band of Joy: Live from the Artists Den: Released: 10 July 2012; Studio: Universal Music Group; Format: DVD, Blu-ray	

=== Music videos ===
Year	Title	Album
1982	"Burning Down One Side"	Pictures at Eleven
1983	"Big Log"	The Principle of Moments
1983	"In the Mood"	The Principle of Moments
1984	"Sea of Love"	The Honeydrippers: Volume One
1985	"Rockin' at Midnight"	The Honeydrippers: Volume One
1986	"Little by Little"	Shaken 'n' Stirred
1986	"Pink and Black"	Shaken 'n' Stirred
1988	"Heaven Knows"	Now and Zen
1988	"Ship of Fools"	Now and Zen
1988	"Tall Cool One"	Now and Zen
1990	"Hurting Kind (I've Got My Eyes on You)"	Manic Nirvana
1993	"29 Palms"	Fate of Nations
1993	"Calling to You"	Fate of Nations
1993	"I Believe"	Fate of Nations
1993	"If I Were a Carpenter"	Fate of Nations
2002	"Darkness, Darkness"	Dreamland
2002	"Morning Dew"	Dreamland
2005	"Shine It All Around"	Mighty ReArranger
2007	"Gone, Gone, Gone (Done Moved On)"	Raising Sand
2008	"Please Read the Letter"	Raising Sand
2010	"Angel Dance"	Band of Joy
2014	"Rainbow"	Lullaby and the Ceaseless Roar

== Band work ==
=== Listen ===
- "You'd Better Run"/"Everybody's Gonna Say" (1966), single

=== The Honeydrippers ===
- The Honeydrippers: Volume One (1984), EP

=== The Crawling King Snakes ===
- "Philadelphia Baby" (1985), from the soundtrack album Porky's Revenge!

=== Saving Grace ===
- Saving Grace (2025), LP
