= Nine Lives (Robert Plant album) =

Box set of Robert Plant's solo work

Box set by Robert Plant
- Released: 21 November 2006
- Recorded: 1982–2005
- Genre: Rock
- Label: Es Paranza/Rhino/Atlantic
- Producer: Chris Hughes, Tim Palmer, Phil Johnstone, Robert Plant

Robert Plant chronology
| Mighty ReArranger (2005) | Nine Lives (2006) | Raising Sand (2007) |

Nine Lives is a box set of Robert Plant's solo work, released on 21 November 2006. It includes remastered and expanded editions of nine albums with unreleased tracks and b-sides and a DVD.

The DVD has 20 music videos, live performance footage, and a career-spanning interview with Plant, as well as interviews with friends including drummer Phil Collins, Who lead singer Roger Daltrey, singer-songwriter Tori Amos, tennis star John McEnroe, and former Atlantic Records President Ahmet Ertegun, among others.

The albums are:

- Pictures at Eleven
- The Principle of Moments
- The Honeydrippers: Volume One
- Shaken 'n' Stirred
- Now and Zen
- Manic Nirvana
- Fate of Nations
- Dreamland
- Mighty ReArranger

Professional ratings
Review scores
| Source | Rating |
|---|---|
| Allmusic | link |
| Rolling Stone | link |

== Track listing ==
=== Disc 1: Pictures at Eleven ===
1. "Burning Down One Side"
2. "Moonlight in Samosa"
3. "Pledge Pin"
4. "Slow Dancer"
5. "Worse Than Detroit"
6. "Fat Lip"
7. "Like I've Never Been Gone"
8. "Mystery Title"
9. "Far Post"
10. "Like I've Never Been Gone" (Live)

=== Disc 2: The Principle of Moments ===
1. "Other Arms"
2. "In the Mood"
3. "Messin' with the Mekon"
4. "Wreckless Love"
5. "Thru' with the Two Step"
6. "Horizontal Departure"
7. "Stranger Here... Than Over There"
8. "Big Log"
9. "In the Mood" (Live)
10. "Thru' with the Two Step" (Live)
11. "Lively Up Yourself" (Live)
12. "Turnaround"

=== Disc 3: The Honeydrippers: Volume 1 ===
1. "I Get a Thrill"
2. "Sea of Love"
3. "I Got a Woman"
4. "Young Boy Blues"
5. "Rockin' at Midnight"
6. "Rockin' at Midnight" (Live)

=== Disc 4: Shaken 'n' Stirred ===
1. "Hip to Hoo"
2. "Kallalou Kallalou"
3. "Too Loud"
4. "Trouble for Money"
5. "Pink and Black"
6. "Little by Little"
7. "Doo Doo A Do Do"
8. "Easily Lead"
9. "Sixes and Sevens"
10. "Little by Little" (Remixed Long Version)

=== Disc 5: Now and Zen ===
1. "Heaven Knows"
2. "Dance on My Own"
3. "Tall Cool One"
4. "The Way I Feel"
5. "Helen of Troy"
6. "Billy's Revenge"
7. "Ship of Fools"
8. "Why"
9. "White Clean and Neat"
10. "Walking Towards Paradise"
11. "Billy's Revenge" (Live)
12. "Ship of Fools" (Live)
13. "Tall Cool One" (Live)

=== Disc 6: Manic Nirvana ===
1. "Hurting Kind (I've Got My Eyes on You)"
2. "Big Love"
3. "S S S & Q"
4. "I Cried"
5. "She Said"
6. "Nirvana"
7. "Tie Dye on the Highway"
8. "Your Ma Said You Cried in Your Sleep Last Night"
9. "Anniversary"
10. "Liars Dance"
11. "Watching You"
12. "Oompa (Watery Bint)"
13. "One Love"
14. "Don't Look Back"

=== Disc 7: Fate of Nations ===
1. "Calling to You"
2. "Down to the Sea"
3. "Come into My Life"
4. "I Believe"
5. "29 Palms"
6. "Memory Song (Hello Hello)"
7. "If I Were a Carpenter"
8. "Promised Land"
9. "Greatest Gift"
10. "Great Spirit"
11. "Network News"
12. "Colours of a Shade"
13. "Great Spirit" (Acoustic Mix)
14. "Rollercoaster" (Demo)
15. "8.05"
16. "Dark Moon" (Acoustic)

=== Disc 8: Dreamland ===
1. "Funny in My Mind"
2. "Morning Dew"
3. "One More Cup of Coffee"
4. "Last Time I Saw Her"
5. "Song to the Siren"
6. "Win My Train Fare Home"
7. "Darkness Darkness"
8. "Red Dress"
9. "Hey Joe"
10. "Skip's Song"
11. "Dirt in a Hole"
12. "Last Time I Saw Her" (Remix)

=== Disc 9: Mighty ReArranger ===
1. "Another Tribe"
2. "Shine It All Around"
3. "Freedom Fries"
4. "Tin Pan Valley"
5. "All the King's Horses"
6. "The Enchanter"
7. "Takamba"
8. "Dancing in Heaven"
9. "Somebody Knocking"
10. "Let the Four Winds Blow"
11. "Mighty ReArranger"
12. "Brother Ray"
13. "Red White and Blue"
14. "All the Money in the World"
15. "Shine It All Around" (Girls Remix)
16. "Tin Pan Valley" (Girls Remix)
17. "The Enchanter" (UNKLE Reconstruction)

=== Disc 10: Nine Lives (DVD) ===
1. "Nine Lives" (Documentary)
2. "Burning Down One Side" (Video)
3. "Big Log" (Video)
4. "In the Mood" (Video)
5. "Rockin' at Midnight" (Video)
6. "Sea of Love" (Video)
7. "Little by Little" (Video)
8. "Pink and Black" (Video)
9. "Heaven Knows" (Video)
10. "Tall Cool One" (Video)
11. "Ship of Fools" (Video)
12. "Hurting Kind (I've Got My Eyes on You)" (Video)
13. "Nirvana" (Video)
14. "Tie Dye on the Highway" (Video)
15. "29 Palms" (Video)
16. "Calling To You" (Video)
17. "If I Were a Carpenter" (Video)
18. "I Believe" (Video)
19. "Morning Dew" (Video)
20. "Darkness, Darkness" (Video)
21. "Shine It All Around" (Video)
