= Digging Deep: Subterranea =

Compilation album by Robert Plant
- Released: 2 October 2020
- Label: Es Paranza

Robert Plant chronology
Carry Fire (2017)	Digging Deep: Subterranea (2020)	Raise the Roof (2021)

Digging Deep: Subterranea is a compilation album featuring solo performances from English rock singer Robert Plant, released on 2 October 2020. The songs were assembled as a companion to his podcast series Digging Deep with Robert Plant that explores the composition and recording of hits, album tracks, and previously unreleased songs throughout Plant's post-Led Zeppelin career.

== New tracks ==
- "Nothing Takes the Place of You" is a Toussaint McCall cover recorded for the 2013 film Winter in the Blood.
- "Too Much Alike" is a Charle Feathers cover recorded with Patty Griffin.
- Also featured is "Charlie Patton Highway (Turn It Up – Part 1)", a reworking of the song "Turn It Up" from Lullaby and... The Ceaseless Roar, planned for a follow-up album to Band of Joy.

== Track listing ==
=== Disc one ===
1. "Rainbow" (Robert Plant, Justin Adams, John Baggott, Billy Fuller, Liam "Skin" Tyson) from Lullaby and the Ceaseless Roar (2014)
2. "Hurting Kind" (Plant, Chris Blackwell, Doug Boyle, Phil Johnstone, Charlie Jones) from Manic Nirvana (1990)
3. "Shine It All Around" (Plant, Adams, Baggott, Clive Deamer, Fuller, Tyson) from Mighty ReArranger (2005)
4. "Ship of Fools" (Plant, Johnstone) from Now and Zen (1988)
5. "Nothing Takes the Place of You" (McCall, Robinson), previously unreleased
6. "Darkness, Darkness" (Young) from Dreamland (2002)
7. "Heaven Knows" (Barratt, Johnstone) from Now and Zen
8. "In the Mood" (Plant, Robbie Blunt, Paul Martinez) from The Principle of Moments (1983)
  - Phil Collins – drums
9. "Charlie Patton Highway (Turn It Up – Part 1)" (Plant, Marco Giovino, Buddy Miller), previously unreleased
10. "New World" (Plant, Baggott, Fuller, Dave Smith, Tyson) from Carry Fire (2017)
11. "Like I Never Been Gone" (Plant, Blunt) from Pictures at Eleven (1982)
12. "I Believe" (Plant / Johnstone) from Fate of Nations (1993)
13. "Dance with You Tonight" (Plant, Adams, Boggott, Fuller, Smith, Tyson) from Carry Fire
14. "Satan Your Kingdom Must Come Down" (Traditional) from Band of Joy (2010)
  - Arranged by Plant and Miller
15. "Great Spirit (Acoustic)" (Plant, Johnstone, MacMichael) from Fate of Nations

=== Disc two ===
1. "Angel Dance" (Hidalgo, Perez) from Band of Joy (2010)
2. "Takamba" (Robert Plant, Justin Adams, John Baggott, Clive Deamer, Billy Fuller, Liam "Skin" Tyson) from Mighty ReArranger (2005)
3. "Anniversary" (Plant, Phil Johnstone) from Manic Nirvana (1990)
4. "Wreckless Love" (Plant, Robbie Blunt) from The Principle of Moments (1983)
5. "White Clean & Neat" (Plant, Johnstone) from Now and Zen (1988)
6. "Silver Rider" (Micheletti, Parker, Sparhawk) from Band of Joy
7. "Fat Lip" (Plant, Blunt, Gerald Woodroffe) from Pictures at Eleven (1982)
8. "29 Palms" (Plant, Doug Boyle, Johnstone, Charlie Jones) from Fate of Nations (1993)
9. "Last Time I Saw Her" (Plant, Adams, Baggott, Deamer, Jones, Porl Thompson) from Dreamland (2002)
10. "Embrace Another Fall" (Plant, Adams, Baggott, Juldeh Camara, Fuller, Dave Smith, Tyson) from Lullaby and the Ceaseless Roar (2014)
11. "Too Much Alike" (Chastain, Feathers, Huffman), previously unreleased
12. "Big Log" (Plant, Blunt, Woodroffe) from The Principle of Moments
13. "Falling in Love Again" (Crume, Kelly) from Band of Joy
14. "Memory Song (Hello Hello)" (Plant, Blackwell, Johnstone, Jones, Oliver J. Woods) from Fate of Nations
15. "Promised Land" (Plant, Johnstone) from Fate of Nations

== Personnel ==
- Robert Plant – Vocals
- Patty Griffin – Vocals on "Too Much Alike"
- The Strange Sensation : Instrumentation
- The Sensational Space Shifters : Instrumentation
- Roland TR-808 : Drum sounds on "Big Log"

== Production ==
- Richard Evans – Design & art

== Charts ==
Chart performance for Digging Deep: Subterranea
Chart (2020)	Peak position
Austrian Albums (Ö3 Austria)	42
Belgian Albums (Ultratop Flanders)	117
Belgian Albums (Ultratop Wallonia)	20
Czech Albums (ČNS IFPI)	39
German Albums (Offizielle Top 100)	33
Hungarian Albums (MAHASZ)	6
Polish Albums (ZPAV)	14
Portuguese Albums (AFP)	32
Scottish Albums (OCC)	14
Swiss Albums (Schweizer Hitparade)	15
UK Albums (OCC)	33
