= Sixty Six to Timbuktu =

2003 greatest hits album by Robert Plant

Greatest hits album by Robert Plant
- Released: 4 November 2003
- Recorded: 1966–2003
- Genre: Rock
- Length: 146:53
- Label: Atlantic (US/Canada); Mercury Records
- Producer: Gary Nicholson, Nugetre, Tim Palmer, Martin Russell, Jon Tiven, Simon Emmerson, Danny Kessler, Benji Lefevre, Sally Tiven, The Pat Moran Quartet, Roger Bolton, Phil Andrews, Charlie Jones, Phil Brown, Donnie Fritts, Robin George, The Fabulous Brill Brothers, Chris Hughes, Phil Johnstone, Laurie Latham, Robert Plant, Alexis Korner

Robert Plant chronology
Dreamland (2002)	Sixty Six to Timbuktu (2003)	Mighty ReArranger (2005)

Sixty Six to Timbuktu is a greatest hits/compilation album featuring the history of the career of ex-Led Zeppelin singer Robert Plant, from 1966 to a recording done at the Festival in the Desert in Mali. The album was released in 2003 and contains songs from Plant's eight solo albums up to the time of its release on its first disc, and rarities on its second disc. Some of his well-known songs were omitted from this release, such as "Burning Down One Side", "Other Arms", "In the Mood", and "Hurting Kind (I've Got My Eyes on You)".

== Background ==
Former bandmate Jimmy Page played on four songs: Plant's "Tall Cool One", The Honeydrippers' "Sea of Love", "Heaven Knows" and Rainer Ptacek's "Rude World". The Cure's Porl Thompson played guitar on three songs on this album: '"Dirt in a Hole", "Darkness, Darkness", and Tim Buckley's "Song to the Siren". On the song "Win My Train Fare Home", Thompson contributed to the writing of that song but did not play on the live version.

== Demos and rarities ==
- "You'd Better Run," a cover of the Young Rascals' song, was recorded and released in 1966 when Plant was a singer with a band called Listen.
- "Our Song" was recorded as a solo artist and released as a single one year later in 1967 and is an English version of an Italian song called "La Musica è Finita", written by Umberto Bindi and Franco Califano.
- The next two songs (both demos and covers), include Billy Roberts' "Hey Joe" and Stephen Stills' "For What It's Worth" and were recorded by a group named Band of Joy which featured Robert Plant and fellow Led Zeppelin member John Bonham.
- "Operator" was recorded in 1968 with Alexis Korner on guitar and backing vocals, Robert Plant on vocals and harmonica and Steve Miller on piano. It was later released on the 1972 Korner album Bootleg Him!.
- "Road to the Sun" was recorded with Phil Collins on drums for The Principle of Moments.
- "Philadelphia Baby" was recorded for the Porky's Revenge soundtrack as The Crawling King Snakes, also featuring Collins.
- "Red for Danger" was recorded in 1988, previously unreleased.
- "Let's Have a Party" was released on the 1990 album The Last Temptation of Elvis.
- "Hey Jayne" was released as a B-side on the 1993 single "I Believe".
- "Louie, Louie" was featured on the 1993 soundtrack to Wayne's World 2.
- "Naked, If I Want To" is a Moby Grape cover released as a B-side on the 1993 "Calling to You" single.
- "21 Years" was first released in 1993 on the "29 Palms" single, and then later on the 1997 Rainer Ptacek tribute album The Inner Flame, and was recorded with Ptacek.
- "If It's Really Got to Be This Way" was released on the 1994 Arthur Alexander tribute album Adios Amigo.
- "Rude World" was featured on The Inner Flame, this track in collaboration with Jimmy Page.
- "Little Hands" was released on the 1999 Skip Spence tribute album More Oar.
- "Life Begin Again" was an Afro Celt Sound System track from 2001, featuring Plant.
- "Let the Boogie Woogie Roll" was released on Jools Holland's album More Friends.

Professional ratings
Review scores
Source	Rating
Allmusic	link
Rolling Stone	link
The Guardian	link

== Track listing ==
=== Disc one ===
1. "Tie Dye on the Highway" (Chris Blackwell, Robert Plant) – 5:09
2. "Upside Down" (David Barratt, Phil Johnstone) – 4:10
3. "Promised Land" (Phil Johnstone, Robert Plant) – 4:59
4. "Tall Cool One" (Phil Johnstone, Robert Plant) – 4:37
5. "Dirt in a Hole" (Justin Adams, John Baggot, Clive Dreamer, Charlie Jones, Robert Plant, Porl Thompson) – 4:44
6. "Calling to You" (Chris Blackwell, Robert Plant) – 5:49
7. "29 Palms" (Blackwell, Doug Boyle, Phil Johnstone, Charlie Jones, Robert Plant) – 4:51
8. "If I Were a Carpenter" (Tim Hardin) – 3:47
9. "Sea of Love" (Phillip Baptiste, George Khoury) – 3:04
10. "Darkness, Darkness" (Jesse Colin Young) – 5:03
11. "Big Log" (Robbie Blunt, Robert Plant, Jezz Woodroffe) – 5:03
12. "Ship of Fools" (Phil Johnstone, Robert Plant) – 4:58
13. "I Believe" (Phil Johnstone, Robert Plant) – 4:54
14. "Little by Little" (Robert Plant, Jezz Woodroffe) – 4:41
15. "Heaven Knows" (David Barratt, Phil Johnstone) – 4:04
16. "Song to the Siren" (Larry Beckett, Tim Buckley) – 4:06

=== Disc two ===
1. "You'd Better Run" (Eddie Brigati, Felix Cavaliere) – 2:29
2. "Our Song" (Umberto Bindi, Franco Califano, Nisa, Anthony Ralph Clarke) – 2:31
3. "Hey Joe (Demo Version)" (William Roberts) – 4:58
4. "For What It's Worth (Demo Version)" (Stephen Stills) – 3:30
5. "Operator" (Alexis Korner, Steve Miller, Robert Plant) – 4:36
6. "Road to the Sun" (Barriemore Barlow, Robbie Blunt, Phil Collins, Paul Martinez, Robert Plant, Jezz Woodroffe) – 5:35
7. "Philadelphia Baby" (Charlie Rich) – 2:13
8. "Red For Danger" (Robin George) – 3:38
9. "Let's Have a Party" (Jessie Mae Robinson) – 3:40
10. "Hey Jayne" (Charlie Jones, Robert Plant) – 5:23
11. "Louie, Louie" (Richard Berry) – 2:52
12. "Naked if I Want To" (Jerry Miller) – 0:46
13. "21 Years" (Robert Plant, Rainer Ptacek) – 3:30
14. "If It's Really Got to Be This Way" (Arthur Alexander, Donnie Fritts, Gary Nicholson) – 3:59
15. "Rude World" (Rainer Ptacek) – 3:45
16. "Little Hands" (Skip Spence) – 4:19
17. "Life Begin Again" (Simon Emmerson, Iarla Ó Lionáird, Mass, James McNally, Martin Russell) – 6:19
18. "Let the Boogie Woogie Roll" (Ahmet Ertegün, Jerry Wexler) – 2:36
19. "Win My Train Fare Home" (Live) (Justin Adams, John Baggot, Clive Deamer, Charlie Jones, Robert Plant, Porl Thompson) – 6:15
