= Twentynine Palms (disambiguation) =

Twentynine Palms, California is a town in San Bernardino County, California.

Twentynine Palms may also refer to:

- Twentynine Palms (film), a 2003 film
- 29 Palms (film), a 2002 crime film
- Marine Corps Air Ground Combat Center Twentynine Palms, a United States Marine Corps camp
- "29 Palms" (song), a 1993 song by Robert Plant
- Twenty-Nine Palms Band of Mission Indians of California, a federally recognized tribe
