= Satan, Your Kingdom Must Come Down =

Spiritual song

"Satan, Your Kingdom must Come Down" is a traditional spiritual song. A recording of the song by Robert Plant (from his 2010 album Band of Joy) was used as the theme song for the TV series Boss.

Other artists as Uncle Tupelo, Medeski, Martin and Wood, Michael Weston King The Good Sons and Beast made other versions.

An alternative version is entitled "Satan, We're Gonna Tear your Kingdom Down".

It was also used as theme music for the TV series Greenleaf.
