= Custard Pie =

Song by Led Zeppelin

from the album Physical Graffiti
- Released: 24 February 1975
- Recorded: February 1974, April–May 1974
- Studio: Ronnie Lane's Mobile Studio, Headley Grange, Hampshire; Olympic Studios, Barnes, London
- Genre: Hard rock; funk rock
- Length: 4:20
- Label: Swan Song
- Songwriters: Jimmy Page; Robert Plant
- Producer: Jimmy Page

Official audio
- "Custard Pie" (1990 Remaster) on YouTube

"Custard Pie" is the opening track on the English rock band Led Zeppelin's sixth album, Physical Graffiti, released in 1975.

== Lyrics ==
The lyrics to the riff-heavy song pay homage to several blues songs; specifically "Drop Down Mama" by Sleepy John Estes, "Shake 'Em On Down" by Bukka White, and to a lesser extent "I Want Some of Your Pie" by Blind Boy Fuller.

Like several other songs on the album, the lyrics are full of sexual double entendres.

== Recording ==
"Custard Pie" contains a wah-wah solo by guitarist Jimmy Page, which was played through an ARP synthesizer. It also features an electric clavinet played by John Paul Jones and a harmonica solo by vocalist Robert Plant. Bonham's drumming is prominent throughout the track.

== Live performances ==
Despite being rehearsed for Led Zeppelin's 1975 North American tour, this track was never completely played live at Led Zeppelin concerts. The band briefly performed a portion of the song as part of their acoustic set during a concert in Houston, Texas on 21 May 1977. The three surviving members of Led Zeppelin re-united with Jason Bonham sitting in on drums, at his wedding reception in 1990 to play a 20-minute rendition of the song.

In later years, Robert Plant incorporated a chorus of the song on the end of the live version of his solo song, "Tall Cool One". Page also produced his own live version on his Outrider tour. Page and Plant finally performed the complete song together on occasion in 1996 while touring behind their No Quarter: Jimmy Page and Robert Plant Unledded album. In 1999, Page again performed the song, this time whilst on his tour with the Black Crowes. A version of "Custard Pie" performed by Page and the Black Crowes can be found on the album Live at the Greek.

== Reception ==
In a retrospective review of Physical Graffiti (Deluxe Edition), Jon Hadusek of Consequence of Sound called "Custard Pie" a "bouncy opener" that "kicks off side A with a raunchy innuendo, its closing blues harmonica solo trailing into "The Rover"." In another retrospective review of Physical Graffiti (Deluxe Edition), Brice Ezell of PopMatters called "Custard Pie" as one of Zeppelin's "best rock tunes".

Ultimate Classic Rock writer Michael Gallucci ranked "Custard Pie" at number 48 (out of 92) on their list of every Led Zeppelin song ranked. Another UCR writer, Eduardo Rivadavia, ranked the song the seventh best on the album, calling the groove "absolutely massive, continent-sized". A third UCR writer, Sterling Whitaker, placed the song at number 40 on his list of the 50 best Led Zeppelin songs. He called Page's guitar solo "awesomely bizarre".

Spin ranked the song at number 62 on their list of every Led Zeppelin song ranked, calling it their most underwhelming opening track, although they still thought that it was "suitably funky" and the "most enthusiastic song about cunnilingus". Vulture ranked the song at number 57 on their ranking of every Led Zeppelin song. They were confused why the band chose to open Physical Graffiti with "Custard Pie", writing that the production is "indifferent, lacking the arresting crispness of the band's better work".

== Personnel ==
According to Jean-Michel Guesdon and Philippe Margotin:

- Robert Plant – vocals, harmonica
- Jimmy Page – electric guitars
- John Paul Jones – bass guitar, clavinet
- John Bonham – drums, maracas

== Bibliography ==
- Guesdon, Jean-Michel; Margotin, Philippe (2018). Led Zeppelin All the Songs: The Story Behind Every Track. Running Press. ISBN 978-0-316-448-67-3.
