= 29 Palms (song) =

1993 single by Robert Plant

Single by Robert Plant

from the album Fate of Nations
- B-side: "21 Years"
- Released: 26 April 1993
- Genre: Rock
- Length: 4:51
- Label: Fontana (UK); Es Paranza (US)
- Songwriters: Robert Plant; Chris Blackwell; Charlie Jones; Doug Boyle; Phil Johnstone
- Producers: Chris Hughes; Robert Plant

Robert Plant singles chronology
"Your Ma Said You Cried in Your Sleep Last Night" (1990)	"29 Palms" (1993)	"I Believe" (1993)

Music video
- "29 Palms" on YouTube

"29 Palms" is a rock song by English musician Robert Plant, released in April 1993 by Fontana and Es Paranza as the first single from his sixth album, Fate of Nations (1993). The songwriting credited to Plant, Charlie Jones and Doug Boyle (two of the backing musicians on the recording), Chris Blackwell and Phil Johnstone.

A review in Billboard magazine described "29 Palms" as "richly emotive rock with strong, spell-casting power" and notes Plant's vocal and the guitars and percussion. Released as a single, it became his second most successful single on the UK Singles Chart, where it reached number 21.

== Lyrics ==
In a 1993 interview, Plant would not discuss the song, except to say "'29 Palms' was written on tour, the last time we were in California." Twentynine Palms, California, is a small town located in the Mojave Desert about 140 miles east of Los Angeles. It is best known as one of the main entry ways to the Joshua Tree National Park and the site of one of the largest Marine Corps training bases in the US.

The song includes the refrain:

It comes kinda hard
When I hear your voice on the radio (When I hear your voice on the radio)
Taking me back down the road that leads back to you
Oh, oh, oh
29 Palms
I feel the heat of your desert heart (Feel the heat of your desert heart)
Taking me back down the road that leads back to you

== Music video ==
The accompanying music video for "29 Palms" was directed by Nigel Grierson and produced by Danny Fleet for Limelight. It was released on 26 April 1993 and shot in the desert, interspersed with vignettes of other characters.

== B-sides ==
The CD single featured three non-album songs, "21 Years" and "Dark Moon", both written and performed with singer-songwriter Rainer Ptacek, and a version of "Whole Lotta Love (You Need Love)", also performed with Ptacek.

== Personnel ==
Billboard's single review notes "[v]ibrant electro-acoustic guitars" and "a percussive grandeur that includes skillful use of snare, tom-toms, and timpani". The musicians are:

- Robert Plant – vocal
- Kevin Scott MacMichael – guitar
- Doug Boyle – guitar
- Charlie Jones – bass
- Chris Hughes – drums

== Charts ==
Chart performance for "29 Palms"
Chart (1993)	Peak position
Australia (ARIA)	79
Canada Top Singles (RPM)	11
Europe (European Hit Radio)	7
Germany (GfK)	73
Iceland (Íslenski Listinn Topp 40)	19
New Zealand (Recorded Music NZ)	20
Sweden (Sverigetopplistan)	28
UK Singles (OCC)	21
UK Airplay (Music Week)	17
US Album Rock Tracks (Billboard)	4
