= Ship of Fools (Robert Plant song) =

Robert Plant song

Single by Robert Plant

from the album Now and Zen
- B-side: "Billy's Revenge" (US) "Helen of Troy" (UK) "Helen of Troy (Live)" & "Dimples (Live)" CD3
- Released: August 1988
- Recorded: 1987
- Genre: Rock
- Length: 5:01
- Label: Es Paranza
- Songwriters: Phil Johnstone, Robert Plant
- Producers: Robert Plant, Tim Palmer, Phil Johnstone

Robert Plant singles chronology
"Tall Cool One" (1988)	"Ship of Fools" (1988)	"Hurting Kind (I've Got My Eyes on You)" (1990)

Music video
- "Ship of Fools" on YouTube

"Ship of Fools" is a rock song performed by the English rock singer Robert Plant. It was the third single released from his 1988 album Now and Zen, following "Heaven Knows" and "Tall Cool One". It reached number 76 on the UK singles chart, number 84 on the Billboard Hot 100 and number 3 on the Billboard Mainstream Rock chart. It was Plant's tenth top-10 solo hit on the Mainstream Rock chart.

The song was written by Plant and keyboardist Phil Johnstone, who also co-produced Now and Zen. In an AllMusic review of Now and Zen, reviewer Vik Iyengar singles "Ship of Fools" out for praise, calling the song a "lovely ballad" that demonstrates Plant's "vocal subtlety."

Cash Box called it "one of the best songs Plant has ever written and recorded" with "beautiful melodies and power lyrics."
