= Now and Zen =

Studio album by Robert Plant
- Released: 29 February 1988
- Recorded: November and December 1987
- Studio: Swanyard Studios and Marcus Studios (London)
- Genre: Rock
- Length: 47:03 (CD); 42:19 (vinyl)
- Label: Es Paranza
- Producer: Tim Palmer; Robert Plant; Phil Johnstone

Robert Plant chronology
Shaken 'n' Stirred (1985)	Now and Zen (1988)	Manic Nirvana (1990)

Singles from Now and Zen
- 1. "Heaven Knows" Released: January 1988; 2. "Tall Cool One" Released: April 1988; 3. "Ship of Fools" Released: August 1988

Now and Zen is the fourth solo studio album by the English singer Robert Plant, released on 29 February 1988 by Es Paranza Records, Plant's own label. The album made the top 10 in the US (No. 6) and UK (No. 10). It was certified triple platinum by the RIAA on 7 September 2001. The album was produced by Tim Palmer, Robert Plant, and Phil Johnstone.

== Background and recording ==
The tracks "Heaven Knows" and "Tall Cool One" feature Led Zeppelin guitarist Jimmy Page. (On the liner notes, Page's participation on the songs is noted with a Zoso symbol.) In response to the Beastie Boys' unauthorized sampling of some Led Zeppelin songs on their 1986 album Licensed to Ill, Plant also used samples from Led Zeppelin songs ("Whole Lotta Love", "Dazed and Confused", "Black Dog", "Custard Pie", and "The Ocean") on "Tall Cool One", additionally singing words from "When the Levee Breaks".

== Release and reception ==
Professional ratings
Review scores
Source	Rating
AllMusic	4/5 stars
Collector's Guide to Heavy Metal	9/10
Kerrang!	4/5 stars
Philadelphia Inquirer	4/4 stars
Rolling Stone	4/5 stars
The Village Voice	B

The original released copies of the CD and Album version contained a wolf motif mini-flag in satin red. This is a tribute to his favorite association football team, the Wolverhampton Wanderers (Wolves by fans). This mini-flag is also a rare collector's item. "Walking Towards Paradise" was originally as a bonus track available only on CD versions of the album and as the B-side of the single "Heaven Knows". Rhino Entertainment released a remastered edition of the album, with bonus tracks, on 3 April 2007.

Now and Zen was received positively by both Plant's fans and professional music critics. In a contemporary review for Rolling Stone, Kurt Loder hailed Now and Zen as "some kind of stylistic event: a seamless pop fusion of hard guitar rock, gorgeous computerization and sharp, startling songcraft." Robert Christgau found it superior to his two previous solo albums, which he had found attractive but forgettable. Christgau wrote in The Village Voice that "at its best, it's far from forgettable. Overall effect is a cross between his former band and the Cars."

In an interview he gave to Uncut magazine in 2005, Plant commented that "by the time Now and Zen came out in '88, it looked like I was big again. It was a Top 10 album on both sides of the Atlantic. But if I listen to it now, I can hear that a lot of the songs got lost in the technology of the time."

== Track listing ==
All tracks are written by Robert Plant and Phil Johnstone, except where noted.

Side one
No.	Title	Writer(s)	Length
1.	"Heaven Knows"	Johnstone, David Barratt	4:06
2.	"Dance on My Own"	Plant, Johnstone, Robert Crash	4:30
3.	"Tall Cool One"		4:40
4.	"The Way I Feel"	Plant, Johnstone, Doug Boyle	5:40

Side two
No.	Title	Writer(s)	Length
5.	"Helen of Troy"		5:06
6.	"Billy's Revenge"		3:34
7.	"Ship of Fools"		5:01
8.	"Why"	Plant, Crash	4:14
9.	"White, Clean and Neat"		5:28
10.	"Walking Towards Paradise" (CD edition bonus track)	Jerry Lynn Williams	4:40

2007 remaster bonus tracks
No.	Title	Length
11.	"Billy's Revenge" (Live)	6:00
12.	"Ship of Fools" (Live)	10:35
13.	"Tall Cool One" (Live)	5:07

== Appearances in other media ==
- Plant performed "Ship of Fools", "Tall Cool One" and "Heaven Knows" at the Atlantic Records 40th Anniversary concert in 1988.
- "Ship of Fools" was also featured on the final two-hour episode of Miami Vice, "Freefall". It is the musical accompaniment to Crockett and Tubbs return to Miami via motor yacht after rescuing General Bourbon (a thinly veiled Manuel Noriega-type character) from the fictional Central American nation of Costa Morada.
- "Walking Towards Paradise" was featured in Miami Vice episode "Fruit of the Poison Tree" from Season 5, 1989.02.03.

== Personnel ==
Musicians

- Robert Plant – vocals
- Phil Johnstone – keyboards, programming
- Doug Boyle – guitars
- Phil Scragg – bass
- Chris Blackwell – drums, percussion

Additional musicians

- David Barratt – programming
- Robert Crash – programming
- Jimmy Page – guitar solos (1, 3)
- Charlie Jones – bass (bonus tracks 11–13)
- Toni Halliday – backing vocals
- Kirsty MacColl – backing vocals
- Marie Pierre – backing vocals
- Jerry Wayne – voice-over (9)

Production

- Phil Johnstone – producer
- Tim Palmer – producer
- Robert Plant – producer
- Dave Barrett – engineer
- Rob Bozas – engineer
- Tim Burrell – engineer
- Jonathan Dee – engineer
- Michael Gregovich – engineer
- Martin Russell – engineer
- Icon – design, art direction
- Richard Evans – design, art direction
- Davies and Starr – photography

== Charts ==
Chart performance for Now and Zen
Chart (1988)	Peak position
Australian Albums (Australian Music Report)	11
Canadian RPM100 Chart	4
German Albums Chart	48
New Zealand Albums Chart	7
Norwegian Albums Chart	12
Swedish Albums Chart	18
UK Albums Chart	10
US Billboard 200	6
