= Saving Grace (Robert Plant album) =

Studio album by Robert Plant
- Released: 26 September 2025
- Recorded: April 2019 – January 2025 in the Cotswolds and the Welsh Borders
- Length: 41:48
- Label: Nonesuch
- Producer: Robert Plant; Saving Grace

Robert Plant chronology
Raise the Roof (2021)	Saving Grace (2025)

Singles from Saving Grace
- 1. "Everybody's Song" Released: 16 July 2025; 2. "Gospel Plough" Released: 14 August 2025; 3. "Chevrolet" Released: 4 September 2025

Professional ratings
Aggregate scores
Source	Rating
Metacritic	86/100
Review scores
Source	Rating
AllMusic	4/5 stars
The Arts Desk	5/5 stars
Clash	8/10
Classic Rock	4/5 stars
Mojo	4/5 stars
musicOMH	4/5 stars
Record Collector	4/5 stars
Uncut	4.5/5 stars

Saving Grace is the twelfth studio album by the English singer Robert Plant, credited to Robert Plant with Suzi Dian, released on 26 September 2025 through Nonesuch Records. It features the band Plant has been touring with since 2019 and contains ten cover versions of songs by a variety of artists.

== Background and promotion ==
Saving Grace was named after the band Plant had been performing with for over six years, which includes singer Suzi Dian, drummer Oli Jefferson, guitarist Tony Kelsey, banjo and string player Matt Worley, and cellist Barney Morse-Brown. In a statement, Plant spoke of the joyful dynamic he shared with the band, highlighting "the sweetness of the whole thing" and noting that they would "laugh" together frequently. The album was recorded between April 2019 and January 2025 in studios across the Cotswolds and the Welsh Borders. Plant began working with the Saving Grace collective during the COVID-19 pandemic, creating a roots-oriented sound inspired by folk and traditional blues.

To promote the album, Plant and Saving Grace toured North America in Autumn 2025.

== Composition and content ==
Saving Grace features ten tracks, primarily reinterpretations of material by artists such as Memphis Minnie, Moby Grape, Blind Willie Johnson, The Low Anthem, Martha Scanlan, Sarah Siskind, and Low. Its lead single, a cover of Low's "Everybody's Song", was released on 16 July 2025, the second single "Gospel Plough" on 14 August.

== Track listing ==
Saving Grace track listing
No.	Title	Writer(s)	Length
1.	"Chevrolet"	Joe McCoy; Memphis Minnie; Ed Young; Lonnie Young; Donovan Leitch^{[a]}	2:38
2.	"As I Roved Out"	Traditional arr. Sam Amidon	6:10
3.	"It's a Beautiful Day Today"	Bob Mosley	3:41
4.	"Soul of a Man"	Blind Willie Johnson	4:43
5.	"Ticket Taker"	Ben Knox Miller; Jeffrey Prystowsky	3:40
6.	"I Never Will Marry"	Traditional arr. Robert Plant and Saving Grace	3:34
7.	"Higher Rock"	Martha Scanlan	3:42
8.	"Too Far from You"	Sarah Siskind	4:57
9.	"Everybody's Song"	Zak Micheletti; Mimi Parker; Alan Sparhawk	4:16
10.	"Gospel Plough"	Traditional arr. Plant and Saving Grace	4:27
Total length:			41:48

=== Note ===
- ^{^[a]} signifies an adapter

== Personnel ==
Credits adapted from Tidal.

=== Robert Plant and Saving Grace ===
- Robert Plant – vocals, production (all tracks); harmonica (track 4)
- Suzi Dian – vocals, production (all tracks); accordion (1)
- Oli Jefferson – drums, production (all tracks); percussion (7, 10), backing vocals (10)
- Tony Kelsey – production (all tracks), acoustic guitar (1, 3, 5, 7, 10), electric guitar (2, 4, 6, 9), vocals (3), baritone guitar (8, 9), backing vocals (10)
- Barney Morse-Brown – cello, production
- Matt Worley – production (all tracks), banjo (1, 2, 4, 10), vocals (3, 4, 6–8), acoustic guitar (3, 5, 7, 8), cuatro (9), backing vocals (10)

=== Additional contributors ===
- Tim Oliver – mixing, mastering (all tracks); engineering (2–10)
- Albert Stevens – engineering (1), engineering assistance (2–10)
- Mark Kennedy – engineering (2–10)
- Andrew Scheps – engineering (4, 8)
- Greg Calbi – additional mastering (1)
- Steve Fallone – additional mastering (1)
- Joe Nino-Hernes – vinyl mastering (1)
- Suzi Dian, Richard Evans, Stef Graham and Robert Plant – sleeve design

== Charts ==
Chart performance for Saving Grace
Chart (2025)	Peak position
Australian Albums (ARIA)	33
Austrian Albums (Ö3 Austria)	6
Belgian Albums (Ultratop Flanders)	46
Belgian Albums (Ultratop Wallonia)	10
Croatian International Albums (HDU)	1
Czech Albums (ČNS IFPI)	61
Dutch Albums (Album Top 100)	44
Finnish Albums (Suomen virallinen lista)	23
French Albums (SNEP)	47
French Rock & Metal Albums (SNEP)	1
German Albums (Offizielle Top 100)	12
German Rock & Metal Albums (Offizielle Top 100)	6
Hungarian Albums (MAHASZ)	6
Irish Albums (IRMA)	89
Italian Albums (FIMI)	76
Japanese Western Albums (Oricon)	23
New Zealand Albums (RMNZ)	33
Norwegian Albums (IFPI Norge)	89
Polish Albums (ZPAV)	13
Scottish Albums (OCC)	2
Swedish Albums (Sverigetopplistan)	33
Swiss Albums (Schweizer Hitparade)	3
UK Albums (OCC)	4
UK Americana Albums (OCC)	1
US Americana/Folk Albums (Billboard)	18
US Top Album Sales (Billboard)	17
