= Paul Martinez =

British session musician and songwriter (1947–2024)

Paul Frank Martinez (6 October 1947 – 10 February 2024) was an English session musician and songwriter. Born in Leicester, England, Martinez was best known for his work with Robert Plant, Cat Stevens, Jackie Edwards, Dave Edmunds, George Harrison, Maggie Bell, Vasco Rossi, Patty Pravo, Peter Gabriel, Chicken Shack, and The Adverts, among others.

On 13 July 1985, when Plant, Jimmy Page, and John Paul Jones reunited as Led Zeppelin for the Live Aid concert at the John F. Kennedy Stadium, Philadelphia, Martinez played bass guitar alongside drummers Tony Thompson and Phil Collins.

Martinez also played bass guitar on the only album released by Paice Ashton Lord, Malice in Wonderland (1977).

Martinez died in February 2024, at the age of 76.

== Discography ==
- Jerry Byrd, Christmas in Hawaii (Lehua, 1987)
- Tom Cochrane and Red Rider, Tom Cochrane and Red Rider (Capitol, 1986)
- Mark Oliver Everett, Broken Toy Shop (Polydor, 1993)
- Groove Holmes, Night Glider (Groove Merchant, 1973)
- The Honeydrippers, The Honeydrippers: Volume One (Es Paranza, 1984)
- Paice Ashton Lord, Malice in Wonderland (Polydor, 1977)
- Louisiana Red, Louisiana Red Sings the Blues (Atco, 1972)
- John Otway, Where Did I Go Right? (Polydor, 1979)
- Robert Plant, Pictures at Eleven (Swan Song, 1982)
- Robert Plant, The Principle of Moments (Es Paranza, 1983)
- Robert Plant, Shaken 'n' Stirred (Es Paranza, 1985)
- Patty Pravo, Patty Pravo (RCA, 1998)
- Patty Pravo, Tanto (RCA, 1976)
- Bernard Purdie, Soul Is... Pretty Purdie (Flying Dutchman, 1972)
- Renaissance, A Song for All Seasons (Warner Bros., 1978)
- Dakota Staton, Madame Foo-Foo (Groove Merchant, 1972)
- Cat Stevens, Foreigner (Island, 1973)
- Meic Stevens, Gwymon (Wren, 1972)
- Richard Strange, The Live Rise of Richard Strange (PVC, 1980)
- Stretch, Elastique (Anchor, 1975)
- Stretch, "Why Did You Do It" (Ariola, 1975)
- Johnny Warman, Hour Glass (Angel Air, 1978)
- Stan Webb, The Creeper (Ariola, 1978)
