= Mighty ReArranger =

Studio album by Robert Plant and the Strange Sensation
- Released: 25 April 2005
- Recorded: 2004
- Studio: The Lodge (Bathford); Riverside Studios (Bath); Livingston Studios (London); Attic Studios (Bristol); Ellenbury; Ellenbury; Dol Goch; The Windtunnel
- Genre: Progressive rock; worldbeat
- Length: 54:14
- Label: Sanctuary; Es Paranza
- Producer: Phil Johnstone; Robert Plant; Mark Stent

Robert Plant and the Strange Sensation chronology
Sixty Six to Timbuktu (2003)	Mighty ReArranger (2005)	Nine Lives (2006)

Singles from Mighty ReArranger
- 1. "Shine It All Around" Released: 2005; 2. "The Enchanter" Released: October 2005 (promo)

Mighty ReArranger is the eighth solo studio album by the English rock singer Robert Plant and the first one with his backing band, Strange Sensation. It was released internationally on 25 April 2005, on 9 May in the United Kingdom and 10 May in the United States.

It contains a blend of world and Western music influences (with a psychedelic twist) alongside mystical, oblique, and somewhat cynical references to religion and destiny.

== Themes ==
The Mighty ReArranger is a fate-like entity that controls the affairs of humanity, and the album explores themes of mysticism and fate. "Freedom Fries" is critical of the presidency of George W. Bush and the climate of United States politics after the September 11 attacks.

== Release history ==
A Special Tour Edition of the album was released in France containing a bonus live disc with songs recorded at Studio 104 in Paris on 9 June 2005. The album was re-released in a remastered edition on 20 March 2007, and as a part of the Nine Lives boxset. A special edition of the album sold exclusively in Best Buy retailers features a 44-minute interview bonus disc—A Conversation with Robert Plant—with an interview by Nigel Williamson.

== Reception ==
Professional ratings
Review scores
Source	Rating
AllMusic	4/5 stars
PopMatters	8/10

Mighty ReArranger reached No. 4 on the British charts and No. 22 on the Billboard 200.

This album was chosen as one of Amazon.com's Top 100 Editor's Picks of 2005, and was nominated for two Grammy Awards: Best Solo Rock Vocal Performance for "Shine It All Around" and Best Hard Rock Performance for "Tin Pan Valley".

== Track listing ==
All songs written by Justin Adams, John Baggott, Clive Deamer, Billy Fuller, Robert Plant, and Skin Tyson, except where noted

1. "Another Tribe" – 3:17
2. "Shine It All Around" – 4:03
3. "Freedom Fries" – 2:53
4. "Tin Pan Valley" – 3:47
5. "All the Kings Horses" – 4:20
6. "The Enchanter" – 5:27
7. "Takamba" – 4:06
8. "Dancing in Heaven" – 4:26
9. "Somebody Knocking" – 3:47
10. "Let the Four Winds Blow" – 4:52
11. "Mighty ReArranger" – 4:25
12. "Brother Ray" – 1:12

"Shine It All Around (Girls Remix)", a hidden track with "Brother Ray" – 7:31

Remastered version bonus tracks

13. "Red, White and Blue" – 3:11
14. "All the Money in the World" – 3:12
15. "Shine It All Around" (Girls Remix) – 7:31
16. "Tin Pan Valley" (Girls Remix) – 6:21
17. "The Enchanter" (UNKLE Reconstruction) – 6:50

In this version, "Brother Ray" is by itself on track 12 and the "Shine It All Around" remix is added as a separate track.

Special Tour Edition bonus disc

1. "Shine It All Around" – 4:50
2. "Black Dog" (John Paul Jones, Jimmy Page, and Robert Plant) – 5:03
3. "Freedom Fries" – 5:47
4. "When the Levee Breaks" (Kansas Joe McCoy and Memphis Minnie) – 6:28
5. "All the Kings Horses" – 4:47
6. "Takamba" – 4:49
7. "Tin Pan Valley" – 6:28
8. "Gallows Pole" (traditional) – 5:39
9. "The Enchanter" – 7:55
10. "Mighty ReArranger" – 5:43
11. "Whole Lotta Love" (John Bonham, Willie Dixon, John Paul Jones, Jimmy Page, and Robert Plant) – 10:31

The band also recorded "Another Tribe", "Morning Dew", and "Babe I'm Gonna Leave You".

== Personnel ==
=== Robert Plant and the Strange Sensation ===
- Robert Plant – vocals, harmonica, production
- Justin Adams – electric guitar, lap steel guitar, bendir, tehardent
- John Baggott – keyboards, MIDI, Moog synthesizer, keybass
- Clive Deamer – drums, percussion
- Billy Fuller – bass guitar, double bass
- Liam "Skin" Tyson – acoustic guitar and bass, lap steel guitar

=== Technical personnel ===
- Steve Evans – mixing
- Phil Johnstone – production
- Grahame Baker Smith – sleeve design and illustration
- Mark Stent – production

== Charts ==
Weekly chart performance for Mighty ReArranger
Chart (2005)	Peak position
Australian Albums (ARIA)	51
Belgian Albums (Ultratop Flanders)	29
Belgian Albums (Ultratop Wallonia)	23
Dutch Albums (Album Top 100)	67
Finnish Albums (Suomen virallinen lista)	21
French Albums (SNEP)	24
German Albums (Offizielle Top 100)	25
Irish Albums (IRMA)	49
Italian Albums (FIMI)	11
New Zealand Albums (RMNZ)	27
Norwegian Albums (VG-lista)	10
Swedish Albums (Sverigetopplistan)	13
Swiss Albums (Schweizer Hitparade)	47
UK Albums (OCC)	4
UK Independent Albums (OCC)	1
US Billboard 200	22
