= Band of Joy (album) =

Studio album by Robert Plant and Band of Joy
- Released: 13 September 2010
- Studios: Woodland (Nashville, Tennessee); House of Blues Studios (Nashville, Tennessee); Clinton Recording (New York City, New York)
- Genres: Folk rock; roots rock; country rock; Americana
- Length: 47:32
- Labels: Decca; Rounder
- Producers: Robert Plant; Buddy Miller

Robert Plant chronology
Raising Sand (2007)	Band of Joy (2010)	Sensational Space Shifters (Live in London July '12) (2012)

Band of Joy is the ninth solo studio album by the English rock singer Robert Plant and the first with his new backing group, the Band of Joy. It was released on 13 September 2010 in the UK and 14 September in the US.

== Background ==
In addition to the song "Satan Your Kingdom Must Come Down", which is the opening theme for the Starz television series Boss, the credits of BBC One's Luther for an episode aired on 16 July 2013 and the season two finale of the Syfy series Defiance, the album is notable for the song "Monkey". The song, originally by the band Low, is slowed down to a grinding, spooky gothic rock tempo and mood that is different from Low's version. It is arguably the least similar to other tracks on the album (except for "Satan"), which for the most part carry folk rock or progressive rock moods. Although it is not a staple at Plant's live performances, there have been instances where he has performed it.

The album debuted at number five on the Billboard 200 chart and at number three on the UK Albums Chart. The first single released from the album was "Angel Dance".

== Critical reception ==
Professional ratings
Aggregate scores
Source	Rating
Metacritic	80/100
Review scores
Source	Rating
AllMusic	4.5/5 stars
Rolling Stone	3.5/5 stars
Spin	8/10 stars

Band of Joy was received positively. Metacritic's aggregate score for the album is 80 out of 100, indicating "generally favorable reviews". Rolling Stone, while only giving the album a three-and-a-half-star review, ranked it number eight on its list of the 30 Best Albums of 2010. Q magazine in its January 2011 edition ranked Band of Joy as the second best album of 2010, stating that, "free from having to imitate his 20-year-old self in Zeppelin, the sexagenarian sings to his strengths here, with Miller and Griffin his not-so secret weapons on an album that pinwheels between gentlemanly country-blues ("Cindy, I'll Marry You Some Day"), spooky lo-fi ("Silver Rider") and charming '60s pop ("You Can't Buy My Love")."

== Awards ==
The album was nominated for two Grammy Awards, including Best Americana Album and the song "Silver Rider" for Best Solo Rock Vocal Performance. Frontman and vocalist Robert Plant was nominated for best British Male Solo Artist at the Brit Awards 2011.

== Track listing ==
No.	Title	Writer(s)	Length
1.	"Angel Dance"	David Hidalgo, Louie Perez	3:50
2.	"House of Cards"	Richard Thompson	3:14
3.	"Central Two-O-Nine"	Robert Plant, Buddy Miller, Jason Friedman	2:49
4.	"Silver Rider"	Zachary Micheletti, Mimi Parker, Alan Sparhawk	6:06
5.	"You Can't Buy My Love"	Billy Babineaux, Bobby Babineaux	3:11
6.	"Falling in Love Again"	Dillard Crume, Andrew Kelly	3:38
7.	"The Only Sound That Matters"	Gregory Vanderpool	3:45
8.	"Monkey"	Micheletti, Parker, Sparhawk	4:58
9.	"Cindy, I'll Marry You Someday"	Traditional, arranged by Plant, Miller	3:37
10.	"Harm's Swift Way"	Townes Van Zandt	4:19
11.	"Satan Your Kingdom Must Come Down"	Traditional, arranged by Plant, Miller	4:12
12.	"Even This Shall Pass Away"	Theodore Tilton, arranged by Plant, Miller	4:03
Total length:			47:32

== Personnel ==
- Robert Plant – vocals, backing vocals (1, 2, 3, 5, 11), arrangements (9, 11, 12)

Band of Joy

- Darrell Scott – accordion, acoustic guitars, mandolin, octave mandolin, banjos, pedal steel guitar, lap steel guitar, backing vocals (1–4, 6, 7, 10, 11)
- Buddy Miller – electric guitars, baritone guitar, mando-guitar, 6-string bass, backing vocals (2, 3, 6), arrangements (9, 11, 12)
- Byron House – bass
- Marco Giovino – drums, percussion, backing vocals (3)
- Bekka Bramlett – backing vocals (1, 2)
- Patty Griffin – vocals, backing vocals (2–5, 8, 10, 11)

=== Production ===
- Buddy Miller – producer
- Robert Plant – producer, sleeve design
- Mike Poole – recording, mixing, editing, reconstructions
- Gordon Hammond – assistant engineer
- Tim Mitchell – recording assistant
- Ted Wheeler – studio assistant
- Jim DeMain – mastering at Yes Master (Nashville, Tennessee)
- Alex McCollough – mastering assistant
- Richard Evans – character audition, compilation and assembly
- Michael Wilson – photography
- Bill Curbishley – management
- Nicola Powell – management

== Charts ==
=== Weekly charts ===
Chart (2010)	Peak position
Australian Albums Chart	18
Austrian Albums Chart	21
Belgian Albums Chart (Flanders)	6
Belgian Albums Chart (Wallonia)	10
Canadian Albums Chart	7
Danish Albums Chart	16
Dutch Albums Chart	37
Dutch Alternative Albums Chart	6
Finnish Albums Chart	44
French Albums Chart	21
European Top 100 Albums	29
German Albums Chart	13
Greek Albums Chart	4
Italian Albums Chart	13
New Zealand Albums Chart	6
Norwegian Albums Chart	2
Polish Albums Chart	14
Scottish Albums Chart	3
Swedish Albums Chart	6
Swiss Albums Chart	13
UK Albums Chart	3
US Billboard 200	5
US Rock Albums Chart	2

=== Year-end charts ===
Chart (2010)	Rank
European Top 100 Albums	100
Swedish Albums Chart	77
UK Albums Chart	97

== Certifications ==
Region	Certification	Certified units/sales
Norway (IFPI Norway)	Gold	15,000^{*}
^{*} Sales figures based on certification alone.
