= Fate of Nations =

Studio album by Robert Plant
- Released: 24 May 1993
- Recorded: 1992–1993
- Studio: RAK Studios (London); Sawmills Studio (Fowey); Monnow Valley Studio (Monmouth)
- Genre: Rock; folk rock; alternative rock
- Length: 63:34
- Label: Es Paranza (North America); Fontana (rest of the world)
- Producer: Chris Hughes; Robert Plant

Robert Plant chronology
Manic Nirvana (1990)	Fate of Nations (1993)	No Quarter: Jimmy Page and Robert Plant Unledded (1994)

Robert Plant studio chronology
Manic Nirvana (1990)	Fate of Nations (1993)	Dreamland (2002)

Singles from Fate of Nations
- 1. "29 Palms" Released: April 1993; 2. "I Believe" Released: June 1993; 3. "Calling To You" Released: August 1993; 4. "If I Were a Carpenter" Released: December 1993

Professional ratings
Review scores
Source	Rating
AllMusic	3/5 stars
Music Box	4/5 stars
Rolling Stone	4/5 stars

Fate of Nations is the sixth studio album by the English singer Robert Plant, released 24 May 1993 on Es Paranza Records in North America and Fontana Records internationally. It features former Cutting Crew guitarist Kevin MacMichael on all songs as well as backing vocals. In addition, the album also features violinist Nigel Kennedy on one song. The song "I Believe" is a tribute to Plant's late son, Karac.

== Background ==
Plant explained his album in the following terms:

From the very beginning of this project, around January 1991, right after the Manic Nirvana tour, I knew what I was going to do: go back into my past, listening to [Moby] Grape, the [Jefferson] Airplane, Tim Hardin, Quicksilver, Traffic, and other turning-point artists in rock. These people were trying to tell the listener something, joining various traditions, with the sense of a quest being insinuated and bandied in their acoustic and electronic themes. I'm also proud of what I've attempted to do lyrically [on the album], trying to tell vivid tales that come from a hearty tradition of prose.

== Reissues ==
Fate of Nations was remastered and reissued by Rhino Records on 20 March 2007, with five additional bonus tracks. In April 2019, the album was reissued on vinyl for Record Store Day 2019.

== Track listing ==
Original release
No.	Title	Writer(s)	Length
1.	"Calling to You"	Robert Plant, Chris Blackwell	5:48
2.	"Down to the Sea"	Plant, Charlie Jones	4:00
3.	"Come into My Life"	Plant, Blackwell, Doug Boyle, Kevin Scott MacMichael	6:32
4.	"I Believe"	Plant, Phil Johnstone	4:32
5.	"29 Palms"	Plant, Blackwell, Jones, Boyle, Johnstone	4:51
6.	"Memory Song (Hello Hello)"	Plant, Johnstone, Jones, Blackwell, Oliver J. Woods	5:22
7.	"If I Were a Carpenter"	Tim Hardin	3:45
8.	"Colours of a Shade" (UK edition)	Plant, Johnstone, Blackwell, Maartin Allcock	4:43
9.	"Promised Land"	Plant, Johnstone	4:59
10.	"The Greatest Gift"	Plant, Blackwell, Jones, MacMichael, Johnstone	6:51
11.	"Great Spirit"	Plant, Johnstone, MacMichael	5:27
12.	"Network News"	Plant, Blackwell	6:40

2007 bonus tracks
No.	Title	Writer(s)	Length
13.	"Colours of a Shade"	Plant, Johnstone, Blackwell, Allcock	4:45
14.	"Great Spirit" (acoustic mix)	Plant, Johnstone, MacMichael	3:54
15.	"Rollercoaster" (demo)	Plant, Jones, Blackwell, Boyle, Johnstone	4:01
16.	"8:05"	Don Stevenson, Jerry Miller	1:49
17.	"Dark Moon" (acoustic)	Plant, Rainer Ptacek	4:57

== Personnel ==
- Robert Plant – vocals, guitars (9), backing vocals (11)
- Phil Johnstone – harmonium (3), acoustic piano (4), organ (9), electric piano (10, 11), backing vocals (11), electric orchestra (12)
- Phillip Andrews – keyboards (6)
- Kevin MacMichael – guitars (1–7, 9–12), backing vocals (4)
- Oliver J. Woods – guitars (2, 6)
- Francis Dunnery – guitars (3, 9)
- Richard Thompson – guitars (3)
- Doug Boyle – guitars (5, 12)
- Maartin Allcock – mandolin (7, 8), guitars (8), bass (8), Aeoleon pipes (8)
- Gurdev Singh – dilruba (12), sarod (12)
- Surge Singh – sarangi (12)
- Rainer Ptacek – resonator guitar (14)
- Charlie Jones – bass (1–7, 9–12), all instruments [except guitar and drums] (2)
- Pete Thompson – drums (1, 3, 9, 10, 11)
- Chris Hughes – drums (2–5, 7–10, 12)
- Michael Lee – drums (6, 12)
- Chris Blackwell – drums (9)
- Nigel Kennedy – violin (1)
- Navazish Ali Khan – violin (12)
- Nigel Eaton – hurdy-gurdy (3, 4)
- Lynton Naiff – string arrangements (7, 10)
- Máire Brennan – backing vocals (3)
- Steve French – backing vocals (4)
- Julian Taylor – backing vocals (4)
- John Flynn – backing vocals (10)

=== Production ===
- David Bates – A&R
- Chris Hughes – producer
- Robert Plant – producer
- Michael Gregovich – engineer, mixing (9, 10, 12)
- Tim Palmer – mixing (1–8, 11)
- Henry Binns – second engineer
- John Cornfield – second engineer
- Ross Cullum – second engineer
- Pete Lewis – second engineer
- Mark O'Donoughue – second engineer
- Danton Supple – second engineer
- Jacquie Turner – second engineer
- Martin "Cally" Callomon – sleeve design
- Julian Broad – photography
- Andy Earl – photography
- Bill Curbishley – management

== Charts ==
Weekly chart performance for Fate of Nations
Chart (1993)	Peak position
Australian Albums (ARIA)	37
Dutch Albums (Album Top 100)	38
German Albums (Offizielle Top 100)	56
New Zealand Albums (RMNZ)	10
Swedish Albums (Sverigetopplistan)	19
Swiss Albums (Schweizer Hitparade)	32\
UK Albums (OCC)	6
US Billboard 200	34

== Certifications ==
Region	Certification	Certified units/sales
Russia (NFPF) reissue	Gold	10,000^{*}
United States (RIAA)	Gold	500,000^{^}
^{*} Sales figures based on certification alone.^{^} Shipments figures based on certification alone.
