= Manic Nirvana =

Studio album by Robert Plant
- Released: 19 March 1990
- Recorded: 1989
- Studio: Olympic Studios (London)
- Genres: Rock; hard rock
- Length: 49:43
- Label: Es Paranza
- Producers: Robert Plant; Phil Johnstone; Mark "Spike" Stent

Robert Plant chronology
Now and Zen (1988)	Manic Nirvana (1990)	Fate of Nations (1993)

Singles from Manic Nirvana
- 1. "Hurting Kind" Released: March 1990; 2. "Your Ma Said You Cried in Your Sleep Last Night" Released: June 1990

Manic Nirvana is the fifth studio album by the former Led Zeppelin singer Robert Plant, released on 19 March 1990 by Es Paranza Records, Plant's own label. Lead single "Hurting Kind (I've Got My Eyes on You)", held #1 on the US Mainstream Rock charts for six consecutive weeks.

The vinyl release had 10 songs (five per side) rather than 11, omitting "She Said".

"It has the savvy and emotional strength you'd expect from an adult," enthused Entertainment Weekly.

== Reissues ==
Manic Nirvana was remastered and reissued by Rhino Records on 20 March 2007, this edition included 3 bonus tracks which were taken from the 1990 European CD single release of "Hurting Kind (I've Got My Eyes on You)".

Professional ratings
Review scores
Source	Rating
AllMusic	link

== Track listing ==
Original release
No.	Title	Writer(s)	Length
1.	"Hurting Kind (I've Got My Eyes on You)"	Robert Plant, Phil Johnstone, Charlie Jones, Doug Boyle, Chris Blackwell	4:04
2.	"Big Love"	Plant, Johnstone, Blackwell	4:24
3.	"S S S & Q"	Plant, Johnstone, Jones, Boyle, Blackwell	4:38
4.	"I Cried"	Plant, Johnstone	4:59
5.	"She Said" (CD and cassette only)	Plant, Johnstone, Jones, Boyle, Blackwell	5:10
6.	"Nirvana"	Plant, Jones, Boyle	4:36
7.	"Tie Dye on the Highway"	Plant, Blackwell	5:15
8.	"Your Ma Said You Cried in Your Sleep Last Night"	Stephen Schlaks, Mel Glazer	4:36
9.	"Anniversary"	Plant, Johnstone	5:02
10.	"Liars Dance"	Plant, Boyle	2:40
11.	"Watching You"	Plant, Johnstone, Blackwell	4:19

2007 bonus tracks
No.	Title	Writer(s)	Length
12.	"Oompa (Watery Bint)"	Plant, Johnstone, Jones, Boyle, Blackwell	5:48
13.	"One Love"	Plant, Johnstone, Jones, Boyle, Blackwell	3:15
14.	"Don't Look Back"	Billy Vera	3:02

== Personnel ==
- Robert Plant – vocals
- Phil Johnstone – keyboards, guitars
- Doug Boyle – lead guitars
- Chris Blackwell – guitars, drums
- Charlie Jones – bass

Additional musicians

- Laila Cohen – backing vocals
- Carolyn Harding – backing vocals
- Micky Groome – backing vocals (2)
- Bob Stride – backing vocals (2)
- Siddi Makain Mushkin – voices (11)

Production

- Phil Johnstone – producer
- Robert Plant – producer
- Mark "Spike" Stent – co-producer, engineer
- Bill Price – mixing (1, 2)
- Darren Allison – assistant engineer
- Michael Butterworth – assistant engineer
- Jeremy Wheatley – assistant engineer
- The Leisure Process – art direction, design
- Julia Stone – electronic illustrations
- Ralph P. Fitzgerald – cover photography

== Charts ==
=== Weekly charts ===
Chart (1990)	Peak position
Australian Albums (ARIA)	26
Dutch Albums (Album Top 100)	78
German Albums (Offizielle Top 100)	30
New Zealand Albums (RMNZ)	24
UK Albums (Official Charts)	15
US Billboard 200	13

=== Year-end charts ===
Chart (1990)	Position
US Billboard 200	71

== Certifications ==
Region	Certification	Certified units/sales
United States (RIAA)	Gold	500,000^{^}
^{^} Shipments figures based on certification alone.
