= Heaven Knows (Robert Plant song) =

1988 single by Robert Plant

Single by Robert Plant

from the album Now and Zen
- B-side: "Walking Towards Paradise"
- Released: 18 January 1988
- Length: 4:06
- Label: Es Paranza
- Songwriters: Phil Johnstone; David Barratt
- Producers: Robert Plant; Tim Palmer; Phil Johnstone

Robert Plant singles chronology
| "Too Loud" (1986) | "Heaven Knows" (1988) | "Tall Cool One" (1988) |

Music video
- "Heaven Knows" on YouTube

"Heaven Knows" is a song by the English rock singer Robert Plant, written by Phil Johnstone and David Barratt. It was released on 18 January 1988, by Es Paranza Records as the first single from his fourth solo studio album, Now and Zen (1988). It reached No. 33 on the UK singles chart and No. 1 on the US Billboard Album Rock Tracks chart, becoming Plant's third number one on this chart, following 1983's "Other Arms" and 1985's "Little by Little". Plant's former Led Zeppelin bandmate Jimmy Page played the guitar solo on the song.

== Charts ==
=== Weekly charts ===
| Chart (1988) | Peak position |
|---|---|
| Australia (Australian Music Report) | 32 |
| Canada Top Singles (RPM) | 65 |
| Italy Airplay (Music & Media) | 5 |
| New Zealand (Recorded Music NZ) | 19 |
| UK Singles (Official Charts) | 33 |
| US Mainstream Rock Airplay (Billboard) | 1 |

=== Year-end charts ===
| Chart (1988) | Position |
|---|---|
| US Album Rock Tracks (Billboard) | 16 |
