= Shaken 'n' Stirred =

Studio album by Robert Plant
- Released: 20 May 1985
- Recorded: 1984
- Genres: Post-punk; new wave
- Length: 41:59
- Label: Es Paranza
- Producers: Robert Plant; Benji Lefevre; Tim Palmer

Robert Plant chronology
| The Principle of Moments (1983) | Shaken 'n' Stirred (1985) | Now and Zen (1988) |

Singles from Shaken 'n' Stirred
- 1. "Pink and Black" Released: 10 May 1985 (UK); 2. "Little by Little" Released: May 1985 (US); 3. "Too Loud" Released: July 1985 (US)

Shaken 'n' Stirred is the third solo studio album by the English singer Robert Plant, released on 20 May 1985 by Es Paranza Records. Plant, Benji Le Fevre, and Tim Palmer produced the album, which peaked at No. 19 on the UK Albums Chart and at No. 20 on the US Billboard 200.

The album featured his second Mainstream Rock Tracks top hit, "Little by Little", which was No. 1 on the chart for two weeks and #36 on the Billboard Hot 100. "Sixes and Sevens" also charted on Mainstream chart, peaking at No. 18.

Rhino Entertainment released a remastered edition of the album, with one bonus track, on 20 March 2007.

On his podcast, Digging Deep, Plant remembers "Too Loud" as one song that was misunderstood. "I got some of Bette Midler's girls to help me with some choruses and stuff," he says. "I basically was seriously affected by David Byrne [of Talking Heads]. It's very funny, it's a funny song, it's supposed to be funny." And in a 2023 interview with Vulture, Plant said: "By Shaken 'n' Stirred, I was so determined to become the opening act for Talking Heads. So I started writing more and more oblique pieces of music — embracing what had become new studio techniques and stuff. I probably lost my way, but then there are so many LPs in my being, so you have to live with it and live by it."

Professional ratings
Review scores
| Source | Rating |
|---|---|
| AllMusic | link |
| Rolling Stone | (favourable) link |

== Track listing ==
Side one
| No. | Title | Writer(s) | Length |
|---|---|---|---|
| 1. | "Hip to Hoo" | Robert Plant; Robbie Blunt; Paul Martinez; Jezz Woodroffe; Richie Hayward | 4:51 |
| 2. | "Kallalou Kallalou" | Plant; Woodroffe | 4:17 |
| 3. | "Too Loud" | Plant; Blunt; Martinez; Woodroffe; Hayward | 4:07 |
| 4. | "Trouble Your Money" | Plant; Blunt; Martinez | 4:14 |
| 5. | "Pink and Black" | Plant; Blunt; Martinez; Woodroffe; Hayward | 3:45 |

Side two
| No. | Title | Writer(s) | Length |
|---|---|---|---|
| 6. | "Little by Little" | Plant; Woodroffe | 4:43 |
| 7. | "Doo Doo a Do Do" | Plant; Blunt; Martinez | 5:09 |
| 8. | "Easily Lead" | Plant; Blunt; Woodroffe | 4:35 |
| 9. | "Sixes and Sevens" | Plant; Blunt; Martinez; Woodroffe; Hayward | 6:04 |
| Total length: | | | 41:59 |

2007 Remaster bonus track
| No. | Title | Writer(s) | Length |
|---|---|---|---|
| 10. | "Little by Little" (Remixed Long Version) | Plant; Woodroffe | 5:12 |

== Personnel ==
Musicians

- Robert Plant – vocals
- Jezz Woodroffe – keyboards
- Robbie Blunt – guitars; guitar synthesizer
- Paul Martinez – guitars; bass guitar
- Richie Hayward – drums
- Toni Halliday – additional vocals

Production

- Robert Plant – producer; sleeve concept
- Benji Lefevre – producer; engineer
- Tim Palmer – producer; engineer
- Icon (Andrew Ellis) – design; photography
- Tim Elcoch – silk screen prints

== Charts ==
| Chart (1985) | Peak position |
|---|---|
| Australia (Kent Music Report) | 28 |
| UK Albums Chart | 19 |
| US Billboard 200 | 20 |
