= Dreamland (Robert Plant album) =

Studio album by Robert Plant
- Released: 16 July 2002
- Recorded: 2001–02
- Studio: RAK Studios (London); Moles Studio (Bath); The Church Studios (London)
- Genre: Blues rock; folk rock; psychedelic rock; hard rock
- Length: 54:38
- Label: Mercury Records; Universal Records (US)
- Producer: Phill Brown, Robert Plant

Robert Plant chronology
Fate of Nations (1993)	Dreamland (2002)	Sixty Six to Timbuktu (2003)

Singles from Dreamland
- 1. "Morning Dew" Released: June 2002 (Note: The 4-track CD-single "Morning Dew" (2002) includes: 1. Morning Dew 3:33 (Bonnie Dobson, Tim Rose); 2. A House Is Not A Motel (Live at the Royal Albert Hall – February 2002) 7:11 (Arthur Lee); 3. Robert Plant interview 2:00; 4. Morning Dew – Video); 2. "Song to the Siren" Released: 2002; 3. "Last Time I Saw Her" Released: 2002

Professional ratings
Aggregate scores
Source	Rating
Metacritic	73/100
Review scores
Source	Rating
AllMusic	4/5 stars
Entertainment Weekly	C
Robert Christgau	(1-star Honorable Mention)
Rolling Stone	3/5 stars
The Guardian	4/5 stars

Dreamland is the seventh solo studio album by the English singer Robert Plant. It was released in July 2002. It is a mixture of blues rock, folk rock, hard rock, and psychedelic rock.

== Overview ==
Many of the songs are cover versions, mainly blues, but also some rock. It was nominated for two Grammys in 2002 — Best Rock Album and Best Male Rock Vocal Performance for "Darkness, Darkness."

== Track listing ==
All tracks are written by Robert Plant, Justin Adams, Clive Deamer, John Baggott, Charlie Jones and Pearl Thompson, except where noted.

Dreamland
No.	Title	Writer(s)	Length
1.	"Funny in My Mind (I Believe I'm Fixin' to Die)" (^{A})	Bukka White, Plant, Adams, Deamer, Baggott, Jones, Thompson	4:45
2.	"Morning Dew" (Bonnie Dobson cover)	Bonnie Dobson, Tim Rose	4:26
3.	"One More Cup of Coffee" (Bob Dylan cover)	Bob Dylan	4:03
4.	"Last Time I Saw Her"		4:41
5.	"Song to the Siren" (Tim Buckley cover)	Tim Buckley, Larry Beckett	5:53
6.	"Win My Train Fare Home (If I Ever Get Lucky)" (^{B})		6:03
7.	"Darkness, Darkness" (The Youngbloods cover)	Jesse Colin Young	7:25
8.	"Red Dress"		5:23
9.	"Hey Joe" (Billy Roberts cover)	Billy Roberts	7:12
10.	"Skip's Song" (Moby Grape cover)	Skip Spence	4:55
11.	"Dirt in a Hole" (Bonus Track, UK & Japanese Version, Collectors special edition, 2007 remaster)		4:46
12.	"Last Time I Saw Her" (Remix) (Bonus Track, iTunes Version, 2007 remaster)		3:24

Collectors special edition CD
No.	Title	Length
1.	"Song to the Siren" (Radio Edit)	4:10
2.	"Song to the Siren" (Alpha Mix)	4:54
3.	"Morning Dew" (BBC Radio 2 Session)	4:45
4.	"Funny in My Mind (I Believe I'm Fixin' to Die)" (BBC Radio 2 Session)	4:51
5.	"Darkness, Darkness" (Video)	3:26

Collectors special edition DVD – Austin City Limits – Recorded Live at the KLRU Studios, September 15, 2002
No.	Title	Length
1.	"Darkness, Darkness"
2.	"Four Sticks"
3.	"Down to the Sea"
4.	"Morning Dew"
5.	"Going to California"
6.	"Hey, Hey What Can I Do"
7.	"Fixin' to Die"
8.	"Song to the Siren"
9.	"Babe, I'm Gonna Leave You"
10.	"Backstage Interview"

Collectors special edition DVD – Bonus
No.	Title	Length
11.	"Celebration Day" (BBC Studios - Maida Vale London June 22, 2002 - Radio Broadcast)
12.	"Darkness, Darkness" (BBC Studios - Maida Vale London June 22, 2002 - Radio Broadcast)
13.	"Fixin' to Die" (BBC Studios - Maida Vale London June 22, 2002 - Radio Broadcast)
14.	"Morning Dew" (BBC Studios - Maida Vale London June 22, 2002 - Radio Broadcast)
15.	"Tall Cool One" (BBC Studios - Maida Vale London June 22, 2002 - Radio Broadcast)
16.	"Song to the Siren" (BBC Studios - Maida Vale London June 22, 2002 - Radio Broadcast)
17.	"Darkness, Darkness" (The Late Show with David Letterman July 18, 2002)
18.	"Morning Dew" (The Tonight Show with Jay Leno September 10, 2002)
19.	"Look Out Mabel" (Unreleased Dreamland Track performed with Jeff Beck)

Notes

- ^A – based on Bukka White's "Fixin' to Die Blues", a song Led Zeppelin used to perform live.
- ^B – contains elements of: "If I Ever Get Lucky" by Arthur "Big Boy" Crudup; "Milk Cow's Calf Blues" by Robert Johnson; "Crawling King Snake" by Big Joe Williams or John Lee Hooker; and "That's Alright Mama" by Arthur "Big Boy" Crudup.

== Personnel ==
- Robert Plant – vocals
- John Baggott – keyboards, string arrangements (2, 3)
- Pearl Thompson – guitars
- Justin Adams – guitars, gimbri, darbuka
- Charlie Jones – bass
- Clive Deamer – drums, percussion

=== Guest musicians ===
- B. J. Cole – pedal steel guitar (5)
- Ginny Clee – backing vocals
- May Clee Cadman – backing vocals
- Raj Das – backing vocals

== Production ==
- Robert Plant – producer
- Phill Brown – producer, engineer
- Dan Austin – assistant engineer
- Raj Das – assistant engineer
- Graham Dominy – assistant engineer
- Denis Blackham – mastering at Country Masters (Surrey, UK)
- Andie Airfix – artwork, design
- Joe Spix – artwork, design
- Maria Mochnacz – photography
- Bill Curbishley – management
