= Hurting Kind (I've Got My Eyes on You) =

Single by Robert Plant

from the album Manic Nirvana
- Released: March 1990 (US); April 1990 (UK)
- Genre: Rock
- Length: 4:11
- Label: Es Paranza
- Songwriters: Chris Blackwell, Doug Boyle, Phil Johnstone, Charlie Jones, Robert Plant
- Producers: Robert Plant, Phil Johnstone, Mark "Spike" Stent

Robert Plant singles chronology
"Ship of Fools" (1988)	"Hurting Kind (I've Got My Eyes on You)" (1990)	"Your Ma Said You Cried in Your Sleep Last Night" (1990)

Music video
- "Hurting Kind" on YouTube

"Hurting Kind (I've Got My Eyes on You)" is a rock song performed by English rock singer Robert Plant, from his 1990 album Manic Nirvana. It was released as a single and reached number 45 on the UK singles chart, number 46 on the Billboard Hot 100 and number 1 on the Billboard Mainstream Rock chart. It was Plant's fifth number 1 rock song.

The song was written by Plant and band-mates Chris Blackwell (drums and guitar), Doug Boyle (guitar), Phil Johnstone (keyboards) and Charlie Jones (bass guitar).

== B-sides ==
The CD single features three songs not included on Manic Nirvana, including a cover of the Remains song "Don't Look Back".

== Track listing ==
=== CD single ===
No.	Title	Length
1.	"Hurting Kind (I've Got My Eyes on You)"	4:04
2.	"Don't Look Back"	3:01
3.	"Oompah (Water Bint)"	5:45
4.	"One Love"	3:13

== Charts ==
Chart (1990)	Peak position
Australia (ARIA)	63
Italy Airplay (Music & Media)	4
New Zealand (Recorded Music NZ)	39
UK Singles (Official Charts)	45
US Billboard Hot 100	46
US Mainstream Rock (Billboard)	1
