= Other Arms =

- Japanese release picture sleeve

Song by Robert Plant

from the album The Principle of Moments
- Released: 1983
- Genre: Rock
- Length: 4:20
- Label: Es Paranza
- Songwriters: Robbie Blunt; Robert Plant

"Other Arms" is a rock song performed by the English rock singer Robert Plant, the first track from his 1983 album The Principle of Moments. It was Plant's first number-one hit on the Billboard Top Tracks chart.

== Details ==
According to the book What'd I Say: The Atlantic Story, Atlantic Records intended to release "Other Arms" as a single, but Plant refused, not wanting to be pigeonholed as a hard rock artist. Instead, two slower-tempo songs from The Principle of Moments were released: "Big Log" and "In the Mood". Both became top-10 hits on the Mainstream Rock chart and top-40 hits on the Billboard Hot 100. Despite not being released as a single, "Other Arms" became a number-one hit on the Mainstream Rock chart. It reached the number-one spot on August 13, 1983, ending the 9-week chart-topping run of "Every Breath You Take" by The Police.

The song was written by Plant and guitarist Robbie Blunt. The lyrics do not include the song's title; instead the chorus features the repeated line "lay down your arms".
