= Little by Little (Robert Plant song) =

Single by Robert Plant

from the album Shaken 'n' Stirred
- B-side: "Trouble Your Money"
- Released: May 1985 (US); 19 August 1985 (UK)
- Genre: Rock; new wave; pop rock; synth-pop
- Length: 4:43
- Label: Es Paranza
- Songwriters: Robert Plant; Jezz Woodroffe
- Producers: Robert Plant; Tim Palmer

Robert Plant singles chronology
"In the Mood" (1983)	"Little by Little" (1985)	"Too Loud" (1985)

Music video
- "Little by Little" on YouTube

"Little by Little" is a rock song performed by the English rock singer Robert Plant, from his third solo studio album Shaken 'n' Stirred (1985). It was released as a single and entered the US Billboard Hot 100 on 15 June 1985, peaking at No. 36. It was Plant's third Top 40 single as a solo artist.

"Little by Little" was also a number-one hit on the Billboard Mainstream Rock chart, staying at the top position for two weeks. It was Plant's second solo song to top that chart, after "Other Arms" from his second solo studio album The Principle of Moments (1983). It charted on the UK singles chart as well, peaking at No. 83.

"Little by Little" was written by Plant and the keyboardist Jezz Woodroffe. The song was featured on the Miami Vice episode "Junk Love".
