= Tall Cool One (Robert Plant song) =

1988 single by Robert Plant

Single by Robert Plant

from the album Now and Zen
- B-side: "White, Clean and Neat"
- Released: 18 April 1988
- Length: 4:40
- Label: Es Paranza
- Songwriters: Robert Plant; Phil Johnstone
- Producers: Robert Plant; Tim Palmer; Phil Johnstone

Robert Plant singles chronology
"Heaven Knows" (1988)	"Tall Cool One" (1988)	"Ship of Fools" (1988)

Music video
- "Tall Cool One" on YouTube

"Tall Cool One" is a song by the English rock singer Robert Plant. It was written by Plant and keyboardist Phil Johnstone. Plant's former Led Zeppelin bandmate Jimmy Page played guitar on the recording. It was the second single released from Plant's fourth solo studio album, Now and Zen (1988), and gave him his fourth number-one single on the US Billboard Album Rock Tracks chart.

== Background ==
The song features guitar riff samples of Led Zeppelin songs, including "Black Dog", "Dazed and Confused", "Whole Lotta Love", "The Ocean" and "Custard Pie", as well as lyrical references to "Black Dog" and "When the Levee Breaks".

== Critical reception ==
Cash Box magazine called the song a "smoking, balls-out rocker with a really unusual skew."

== Chart performance ==
"Tall Cool One" reached No. 87 on the UK singles chart, No. 25 on the US Billboard Hot 100 and No. 1 on the Billboard Album Rock Tracks chart, giving Plant his fourth number-one single on this chart.

== Charts ==
=== Weekly charts ===
Chart (1988)	Peak position
Australia (ARIA)	47
Canada Top Singles (RPM)	15
Italy Airplay (Music & Media)	16
UK Singles (Official Charts)	87
US Billboard Hot 100	25
US Mainstream Rock (Billboard)	1

=== Year-end charts ===
Chart (1988)	Position
US Album Rock Tracks (Billboard)	3

== In popular culture ==
"Tall Cool One" was featured in a television advertisement for Coca-Cola.
