= In the Mood (Robert Plant song) =

1983 song by Robert Plant

Single by Robert Plant

from the album The Principle of Moments
- B-side: "Horizontal Departure"
- Released: November 1983
- Recorded: 1983
- Studio: Rockfield Studios (Monmouth, Wales)
- Genre: Pop rock; R&B
- Length: 5:19
- Label: Es Paranza
- Songwriter(s): Robert Plant; Robbie Blunt; Paul Martinez
- Producer(s): Robert Plant; Benji LeFevre; Pat Moran

Robert Plant singles chronology
"Big Log" (1983)	"In the Mood" (1983)	"Little by Little" (1985)

Music video
- "In the Mood" on YouTube

"In the Mood" is a song by the English rock singer Robert Plant from his second solo studio album, The Principle of Moments (1983). "In the Mood" was written by Plant, guitarist Robbie Blunt and bassist Paul Martinez. The drummer on the recording was Genesis' Phil Collins.

As a popular album track it reached No. 4 on the Billboard Top Tracks chart. It was later released as a single and entered the Billboard Hot 100 on November 19, 1983, peaking at No. 39 in January 1984. It was Plant's second top 40 single as a solo artist, following "Big Log", also from The Principle of Moments. In the UK, the single peaked at No. 81 on the singles chart.

== Chart performance ==
Chart (1983–84)	Peak position
UK Singles (Official Charts Company)	81
US Billboard Top Tracks	4
US Billboard Hot 100	39
