= Doug Boyle =

- Born: 6 September 1962 (age 63); Buckhurst Hill, Essex, England
- Origin: England
- Genres: Hard rock; jazz
- Occupations: Musician; singer-songwriter
- Instruments: Guitar; vocals
- Years active: 1980s–present

Doug Boyle (born 6 September 1962) is an English guitarist and composer, best known for his work with Robert Plant, Nigel Kennedy and later incarnations of Caravan.

Boyle's first major break was playing in Robert Plant's band (1987–92). Since 1994, he has played with Nigel Kennedy, while he joined Caravan in 1996. He remained with Caravan until 2007.

In 2010, Boyle released his first solo album, The Third Rail, available from his website. He toured with Nigel Kennedy throughout Europe.
