= Phil Johnstone =

English songwriter, musician, and producer (1957–2021)

- Born: 1 September 1957; Hitchin, England
- Died: 31 May 2021 (aged 63) Exeter, England
- Occupations: Songwriter; musician; record producer
- Instruments: Keyboards; guitar
- Years active: 1981–2021

Phil Johnstone (1 September 1957 – 31 May 2021) was an English songwriter, keyboardist, guitarist, and record producer, best known for his work with rock singer Robert Plant. His songwriting credits include Plant's number-one Mainstream Rock hits "Heaven Knows", "Tall Cool One" and "Hurting Kind (I've Got My Eyes on You)".

== Biography ==
Johnstone first worked with Plant on the 1988 album Now and Zen, which Johnstone co-produced. Johnstone co-wrote most of the songs on the album; he also wrote songs for Plant's follow-up albums Manic Nirvana (1990) and Fate of Nations (1993).

Following his work with Plant, Johnstone wrote songs for singer Alannah Myles' 1995 album A-lan-nah. Recorded and produced Freeborn John by Rev Hammer 1996 on Cooking Vinyl. Johnstone also co-wrote the whole of The Levellers' 2000 album Hello Pig. Johnstone also headed the popular all-star musical festival act, "The Fabulous Good Time Party Boys", which featured members of the Levellers, Irish singer/songwriter Dan Donnelly, American musician Roy Harter, and two of his children, Alex Johnstone and Emily Johnstone.

== Death ==
Johnstone died on 31 May 2021 at the age of 63, after a few years of bad health. His funeral service was held on 2 July at St James' Parish Church in Exeter.
