= Robert Plant =

English singer (born 1948)

Robert Plant CBE
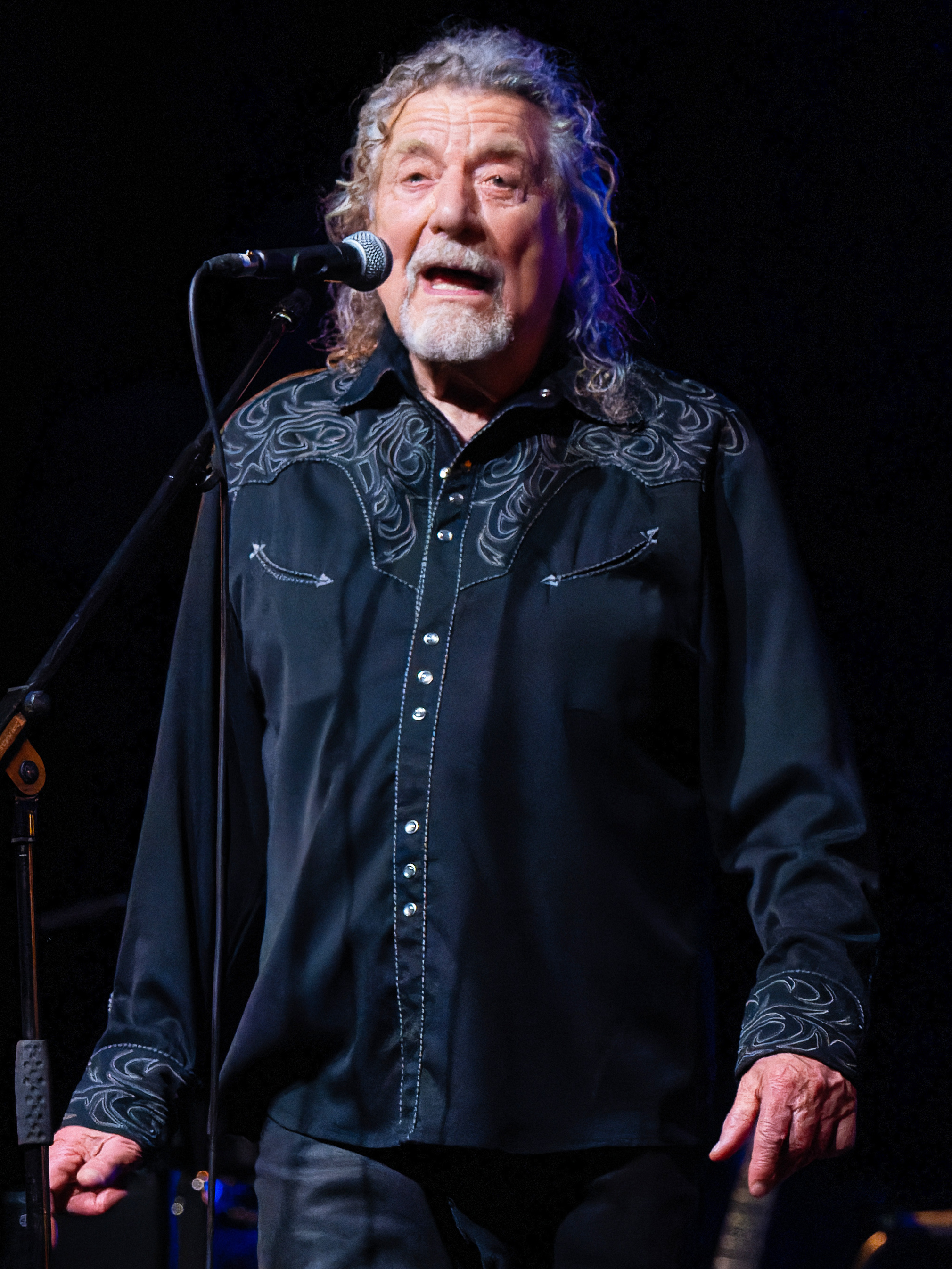
- Plant performing live at the Regent Theatre in Ipswich, 2024
- Born: Robert Anthony Plant; 20 August 1948 (age 78); West Bromwich, Staffordshire, England
- Occupations: Singer; songwriter
- Years active: 1965–present
- Spouse: Maureen Wilson (m. 1968; div. 1983)
- Children: 4
- Musical career
- Origin: Halesowen, Worcestershire, England
- Genres: Rock; blues; folk; country; hard rock; heavy metal
- Instruments: Vocals; harmonica
- Labels: Atlantic; Swan Song; Es Paranza; Sanctuary; Mercury; Universal; Rounder; Nonesuch
- Member of: Saving Grace
- Formerly of: Led Zeppelin; Band of Joy; The Honeydrippers; Hobbstweedle; Page and Plant; Robert Plant and the Strange Sensation
- Website: robertplant.com

Robert Anthony Plant (born 20 August 1948) is an English singer and songwriter. He was the lead singer and lyricist of the rock band Led Zeppelin from its founding in 1968 until their break-up in 1980. Since then, he has had a successful solo career, sometimes collaborating with other artists such as Alison Krauss. Regarded by many as one of the greatest singers in rock music, Plant is known for his raw stage performances and his powerful, wide-ranging voice.

Plant was born and raised in the West Midlands area of England. On leaving grammar school he briefly trained as a chartered accountant, before leaving home aged 16 to concentrate on singing with a series of local blues bands, including Band of Joy with drummer John Bonham. In 1968 he was invited by manager Peter Grant and guitarist Jimmy Page to join the Yardbirds, which Grant and Page were attempting to keep going after some of its members had left. The new version of the Yardbirds, with Plant, changed their name to Led Zeppelin and, from the late 1960s until their disbandment in 1980, had international success.

Plant is a charismatic rock 'n' roll frontman, comparable to '70s contemporaries such as Mick Jagger of the Rolling Stones and Roger Daltrey of the Who. After Led Zeppelin dissolved in 1980, Plant continued to perform and record continuously on a variety of solo and group projects. His first two solo studio albums, Pictures at Eleven (1982) and The Principle of Moments (1983), each reached the top ten on the US Billboard 200.

With his rock and roll band the Honeydrippers he scored a top-ten hit single in 1984 with a cover version of Phil Phillips' 1959 song "Sea of Love", which featured former Led Zeppelin bandmate Jimmy Page on guitar. Plant's fourth solo studio album Now and Zen (1988) was certified 3× Platinum and is his biggest-selling solo album to date. In the 1990s, another reunion project called Page and Plant released two albums and earned a Grammy Award for Best Hard Rock Performance in 1998 for "Most High". In 2007, Plant began a collaboration with American bluegrass artist Alison Krauss, releasing their debut studio album Raising Sand, which won the Grammy Award for Album of the Year in 2009 and produced the hit song "Please Read the Letter", which won the Grammy Award for Record of the Year the same year. In 2010, he revived the Band of Joy, and in 2012 formed a new band, the Sensational Space Shifters, followed by a reunion with Alison Krauss in 2021.

In 1995, Led Zeppelin were inducted into the Rock and Roll Hall of Fame. Rolling Stone ranked Plant as one of the 100 best singers of all time (2008); and he was the top pick for the greatest lead singer in a 2011 readers' poll. Hit Parader named Plant the "Greatest Metal Vocalist of All Time" (2006). Plant was named one of the 50 Great Voices by NPR. In 2009, Plant was voted "the greatest voice in rock" in a poll conducted by classic rock radio station Planet Rock. Billboard ranked him number four on their list of The 50 Greatest Rock Lead Singers of All Time (2023).

== Early life and musical beginnings ==
Robert Anthony Plant was born on 20 August 1948, in the Black Country town of West Bromwich, Staffordshire, England, to Robert C. Plant, a qualified civil engineer who served in the Royal Air Force during the Second World War, and Annie Celia Plant (née Cain), who was of Romani descent. He grew up in the Hayley Green area of Halesowen, Worcestershire. Plant gained an interest in singing and rock and roll music at an early age; in an interview with Andrew Denton on the Denton talk show in 1994, Plant stated his desire, as a ten-year-old, to be like Elvis Presley:

When I was a kid I used to hide behind the curtains at home at Christmas and I used to try and be Elvis. There was a certain ambience between the curtains and the French windows, there was a certain sound there for a ten-year-old. which was all the ambience I got at ten years old ... And I always wanted to be ... a bit similar to that.

Plant left King Edward VI Grammar School for Boys in Stourbridge in his mid-teens and developed a strong passion for the blues, mainly through his admiration for Willie Dixon, Robert Johnson and early renditions of songs in this genre.

I suppose I was quite interested in my stamp collection and Romani-British history. I was a little grammar school boy, and I could hear this kind of calling through the airwaves.

Plant abandoned training as a chartered accountant after only two weeks to attend college in an effort to gain more GCE passes and to become part of the Midlands blues scene. "I left home at 16," he said, "and I started my real education musically, moving from group to group, furthering my knowledge of the blues and of other music which had weight and was worth listening to."

Plant's early blues influences included Johnson, Bukka White, Skip James, Sleepy John Estes, and Jerry Miller of Moby Grape. Plant had various jobs while pursuing his music career, one of which was working for the major construction company George Wimpey in Birmingham in 1967, laying tarmac on roads. He also worked at Woolworths in Halesowen town for a short period of time. He cut three obscure singles on CBS Records and sang with a variety of bands, including the Crawling King Snakes, which brought him into contact with drummer John Bonham. They both went on to play in the Band of Joy, merging blues with newer psychedelic trends.

== Led Zeppelin (1968–1980) ==
=== Early years ===
By July 1968, guitarist Jimmy Page was searching for a singer after the breakup of the Yardbirds. Page's first choice, Terry Reid, declined, but directed him to Robert Plant, who was then singing with Obs-Tweedle. Page travelled to hear Plant perform and subsequently invited him to his home, where the two found a shared enthusiasm for blues, rock, and folk music. Plant suggested his friend John Bonham for drummer, and the group—initially billed as the New Yardbirds—soon became Led Zeppelin.

Led Zeppelin's self-titled debut album and its early British and American tours quickly established Plant as the band's lead vocalist and lyricist. Their next run of albums—Led Zeppelin II (1969), Led Zeppelin III (1970), the untitled fourth album commonly known as Led Zeppelin IV (1971), Houses of the Holy (1973), and Physical Graffiti (1975)—made the band one of the most successful rock acts of the era. Plant's vocals and lyrics were central to the band's identity, while the group's music combined hard rock with blues, folk and other influences.

In 1975, Plant and his wife, Maureen, were seriously injured in a car crash while on holiday in Rhodes, Greece. The accident forced Led Zeppelin to cancel planned tour dates and shaped the making of their next album, Presence; Plant later said that the record was "absolutely wracked with pain".

In July 1977, while Led Zeppelin were touring the United States, Plant learned that his five-year-old son Karac had died from a stomach virus. The loss was a major personal blow during the band's later years.

=== Lyrics ===
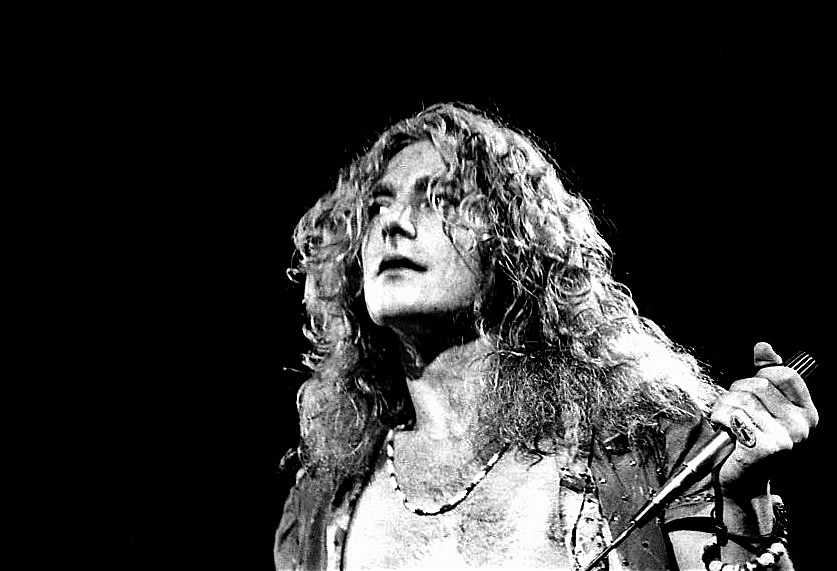
Plant performing live with Led Zeppelin, 1973

Plant began writing song lyrics with Led Zeppelin during the making of Led Zeppelin II in 1969. According to Jimmy Page:

The most important thing about Led Zeppelin II is that up to that point I'd contributed lyrics. Robert hadn't written before, and it took a lot of ribbing to get him into writing, which was funny. And then, on the second LP, he wrote the words of Thank You. He said, "I'd like to have a crack at this and write it for my wife."

Plant's lyrics with Led Zeppelin were often mystical, philosophical and spiritual, alluding to events in classical and Norse mythology, such as "Immigrant Song", which refers to Valhalla and Viking conquests. However, the song "No Quarter" is often misunderstood to refer to the god Thor; the song actually refers to Mount Thor (which is named after the god). Another example is "The Rain Song".

Plant was influenced by the English writer and philologist J. R. R. Tolkien, whose book series inspired lyrics in some early Led Zeppelin songs. Most notably, "The Battle of Evermore", "Misty Mountain Hop", "No Quarter", "Ramble On" and "Over the Hills and Far Away" contain verses referencing Tolkien's The Lord of the Rings and The Hobbit. Conversely, Plant sometimes used more straightforward blues themes dealing with sex, as in "The Lemon Song", "Trampled Under Foot" about giving in to sexual temptation, and "Black Dog" narrated by a man obsessed with a woman.

Welsh mythology forms a basis of Plant's interest in mystical lyrics. He grew up close to the Welsh border and would often take summer trips to Snowdonia. Plant bought a Welsh sheep farm in 1973, and began taking Welsh lessons and looking into the mythology of the land (such as the Black Book of Carmarthen, the Book of Taliesin, etc.) Plant's first son, Karac, was named after the Welsh chieftain Caratacus. The song "Bron-Y-Aur Stomp" is named after the 18th-century Welsh cottage Bron-Yr-Aur, owned by a friend of his father; it later inspired the title of the instrumental song "Bron-Yr-Aur" from their sixth studio album Physical Graffiti (1975). The songs "Misty Mountain Hop", "That's the Way", and early dabblings in what would become "Stairway to Heaven" were written in Wales and lyrically reflect Plant's mystical view of the land. Critic Steve Turner suggests that Plant's early and continued experiences in Wales served as the foundation for his broader interest in the mythologies he revisits in his lyrics (including those myth systems of Tolkien and the Norse).

Page's passion for diverse musical experiences influenced Plant to explore Africa, specifically Marrakesh in Morocco, where he encountered the Egyptian singer and film actress Umm Kulthum:

I was intrigued by the scales, initially, and obviously the vocal work. The way she sang, the way she could hold a note, you could feel the tension, you could tell that everybody, the whole orchestra, would hold a note until she wanted to change.

Both he and Jimmy Page revisited these influences during their live reunion album No Quarter: Jimmy Page and Robert Plant Unledded in 1994. During his solo career Plant tapped into these influences many times, most notably on his seventh studio album Dreamland (2002).

Most of the lyrics of "Stairway to Heaven" from Led Zeppelin IV were written spontaneously by Plant in 1970 at Headley Grange while the track was being recorded. While never released as a single, the song has topped polls as the greatest song of all time.

=== Stage persona ===
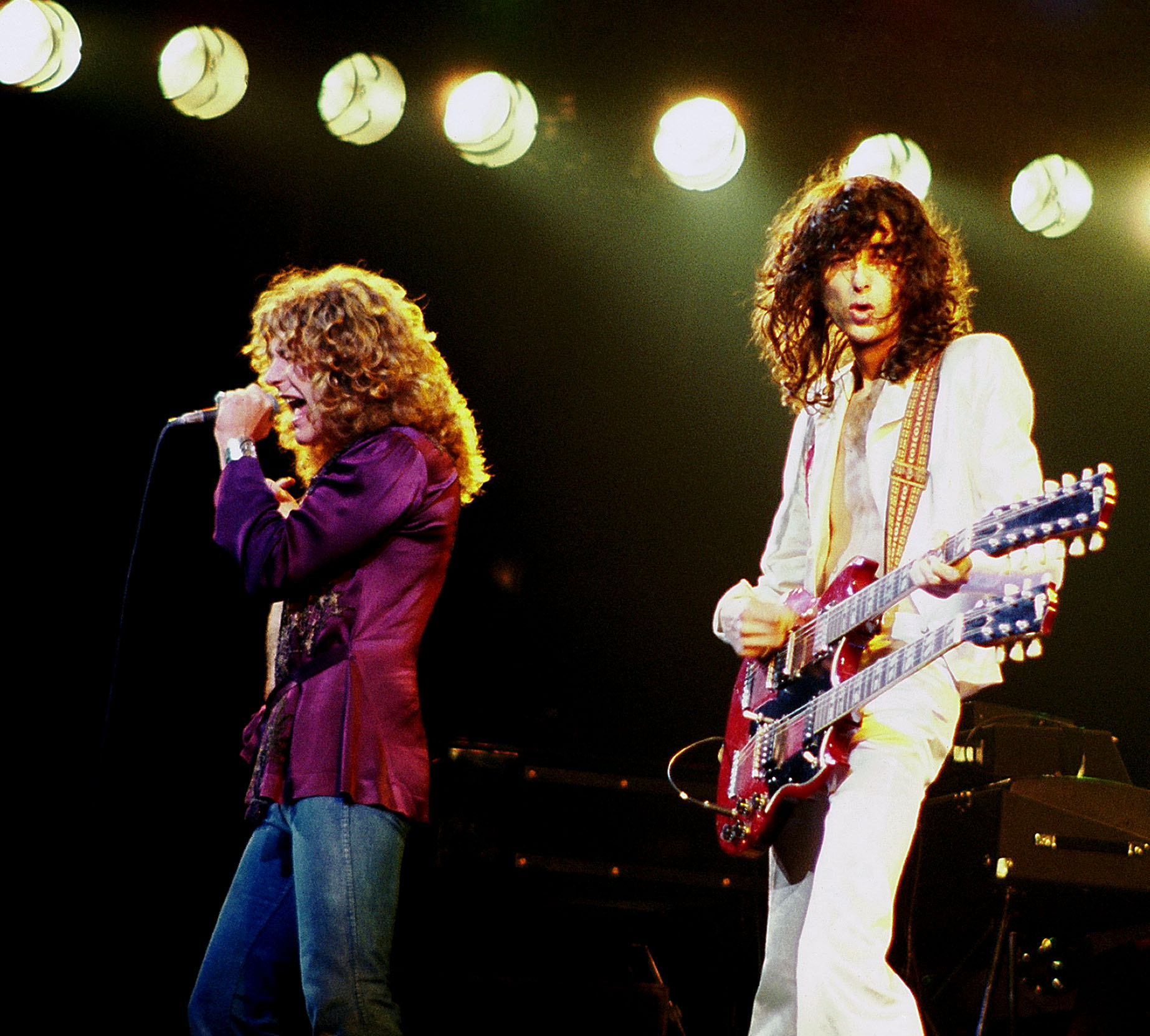
Plant (left) with Led Zeppelin guitarist Jimmy Page in concert in Chicago, Illinois, 1977

Plant enjoyed great success with Led Zeppelin throughout the 1970s and developed a compelling image as the charismatic rock and roll front man, similar to his contemporaries the Who's lead singer Roger Daltrey, Mick Jagger of the Rolling Stones, and Jim Morrison of the Doors. With his mane of long blond hair and powerful, bare-chested appearance, Plant helped to create the "god of rock and roll" or "rock god" archetype. On stage, Plant was particularly active in live performances, often dancing, jumping, skipping, snapping his fingers, clapping, making emphatic gestures to emphasise a lyric or cymbal crash, throwing back his head, or placing his hands on his hips. As the 1970s progressed he, along with the other members of Led Zeppelin, became increasingly flamboyant on-stage, and wore more elaborate, colourful clothing and jewellery.

According to Classic Rock magazine, "once he had a couple of US tours under his belt, "Percy" Plant swiftly developed a staggering degree of bravado and swagger that irrefutably enhanced Led Zeppelin's rapidly burgeoning appeal." In 1994, during his "Unledded" tour with Jimmy Page, Plant himself reflected tongue-in-cheek upon his Led Zeppelin showmanship:

I can't take my whole persona as a singer back then very seriously. It's not some great work of beauty and love to be a rock-and-roll singer. So I got a few moves from Elvis and one or two from Sonny Boy Williamson II and Howlin' Wolf and threw them all together.

One of the oddest awards he received was the Rock Scene magazine "Chest O Rama". Readers of the magazine had to decide who had the best chest in rock, and Plant was the winner. When they contacted him about it, he replied: "I'm really greatly honoured although it's hard for me to be eloquent on the subject of my chest."

== Solo career (1981–present) ==
=== Early solo career (1981–1993) ===
After Led Zeppelin disbanded in 1980 following the death of drummer John Bonham, Plant began a solo career. He later said that Phil Collins was "a driving force" and brought "positive energy" to the making of his first solo album, Pictures at Eleven (1982). Encouraged by Collins, who also played drums on the record, Plant followed it with The Principle of Moments (1983).

Plant's early solo work produced several of his best-known post-Zeppelin songs, including "Big Log", "In the Mood", "Little by Little", and "Tall Cool One". In 1984 he also reunited with Jimmy Page in the Honeydrippers, whose EP The Honeydrippers: Volume One included a hit cover of "Sea of Love".

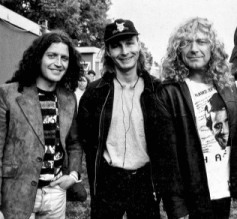
Phil Johnstone, Creem editor Dusty Wright, and Plant (left to right), backstage at the Glastonbury Festival, 1993

Plant continued with Now and Zen (1988), Manic Nirvana (1990), and Fate of Nations (1993). By the early 1990s he had also begun to reintroduce some Led Zeppelin material into his live sets.

=== Page and Plant (1994–1998) ===
Plant and Page resumed working together in the mid-1990s as Page and Plant. They released the live album No Quarter: Jimmy Page and Robert Plant Unledded in 1994 and toured extensively in 1995, including an appearance at the Glastonbury Festival.

The pair followed with Walking into Clarksdale (1998), their only studio album of new material as a duo. Plant later re-recorded one of its songs, "Please Read the Letter", with Alison Krauss.

=== Priory of Brion and Strange Sensation (1999–2006) ===
After the end of Page and Plant, Plant returned to smaller-scale live work with Priory of Brion before releasing Dreamland in 2002 and Mighty ReArranger in 2005 with his band Strange Sensation. These recordings continued Plant's movement away from straightforward hard rock toward a broader mix of blues, folk, and world-music influences.

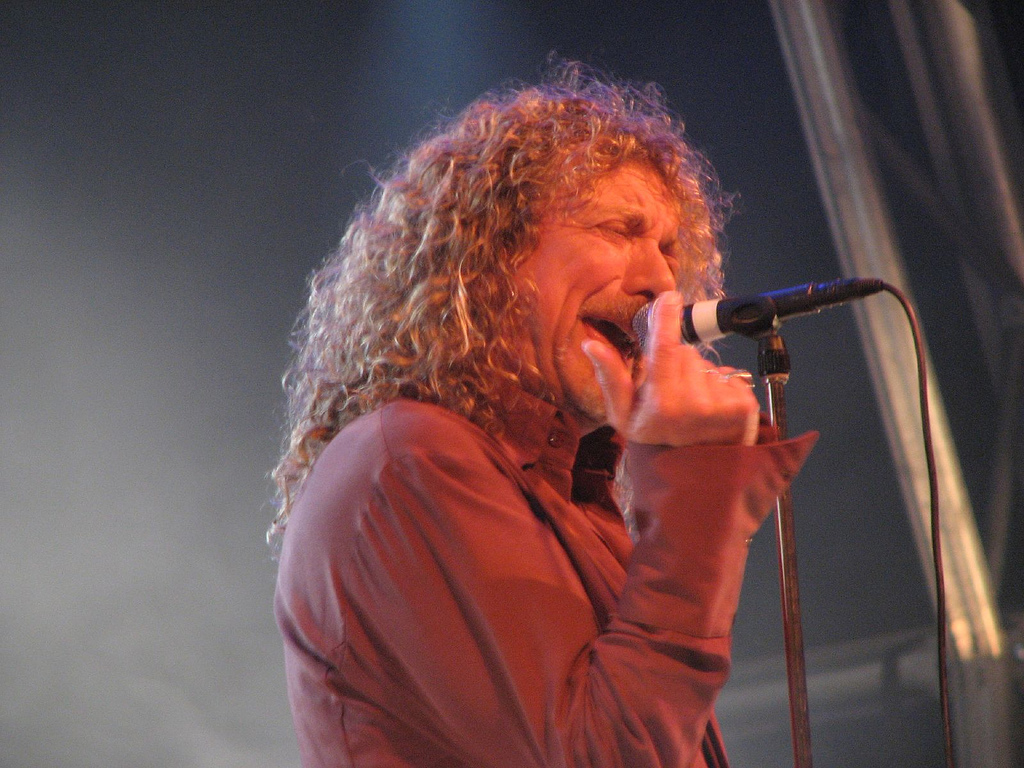
Plant and Strange Sensation performing live at the Green Man Festival, 2007

=== Alison Krauss collaborations (2007–2009, 2021–present) ===
In 2007, Plant began a collaboration with Alison Krauss. Their first album, Raising Sand, was released on Rounder Records and produced by T Bone Burnett. The song "Gone Gone Gone (Done Moved On)" won the Grammy Award for Best Pop Collaboration with Vocals at the 50th Annual Grammy Awards. At the 51st Annual Grammy Awards, Raising Sand won Album of the Year, while "Please Read the Letter" won Record of the Year.

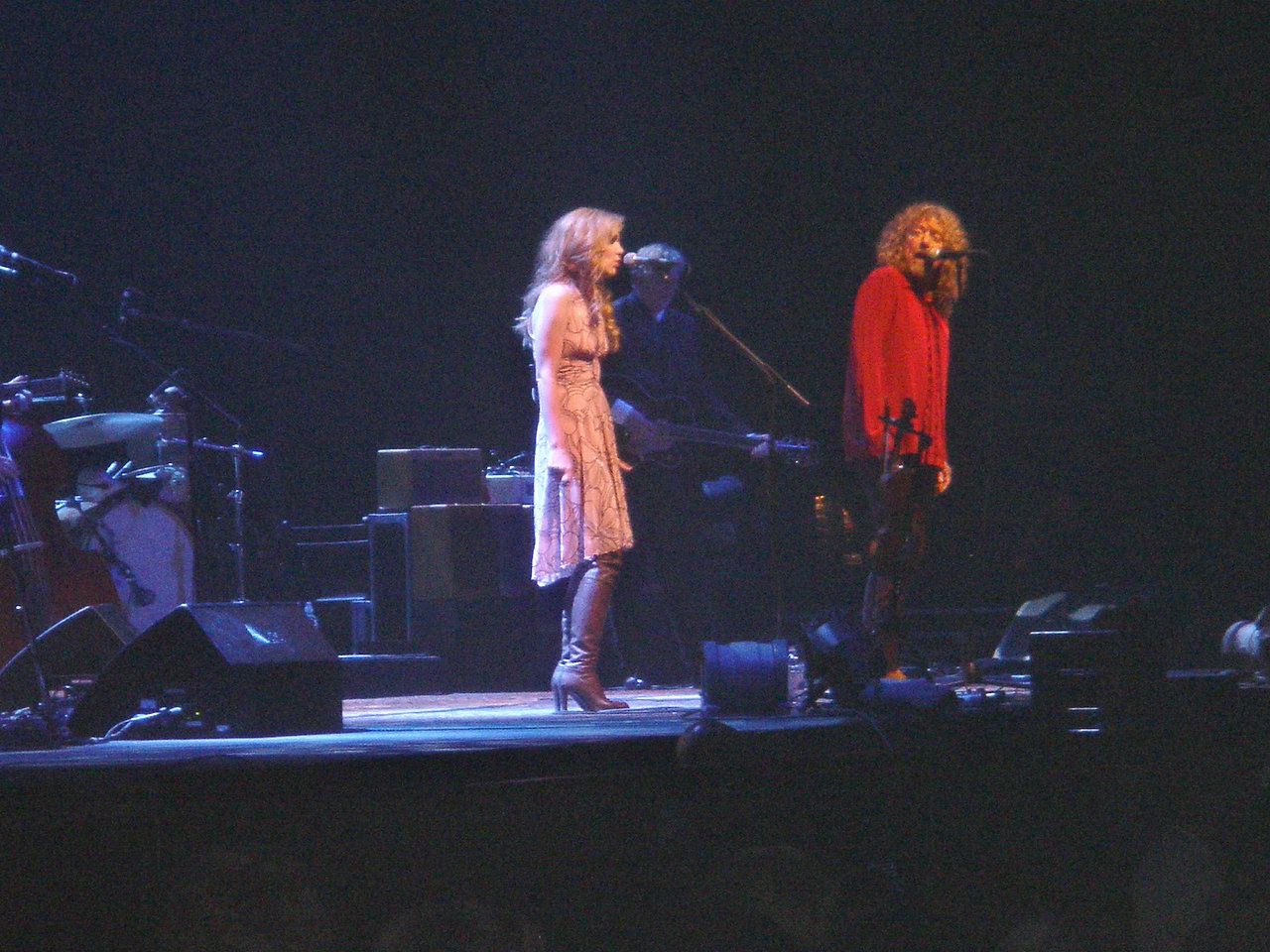
Plant performing live on-stage with Alison Krauss at The NIA in Birmingham, 2008

Plant and Krauss reunited in 2021 for Raise the Roof, again produced by Burnett. In 2024 they returned to North America for the Can't Let Go tour.

=== Band of Joy (2010–2011) ===
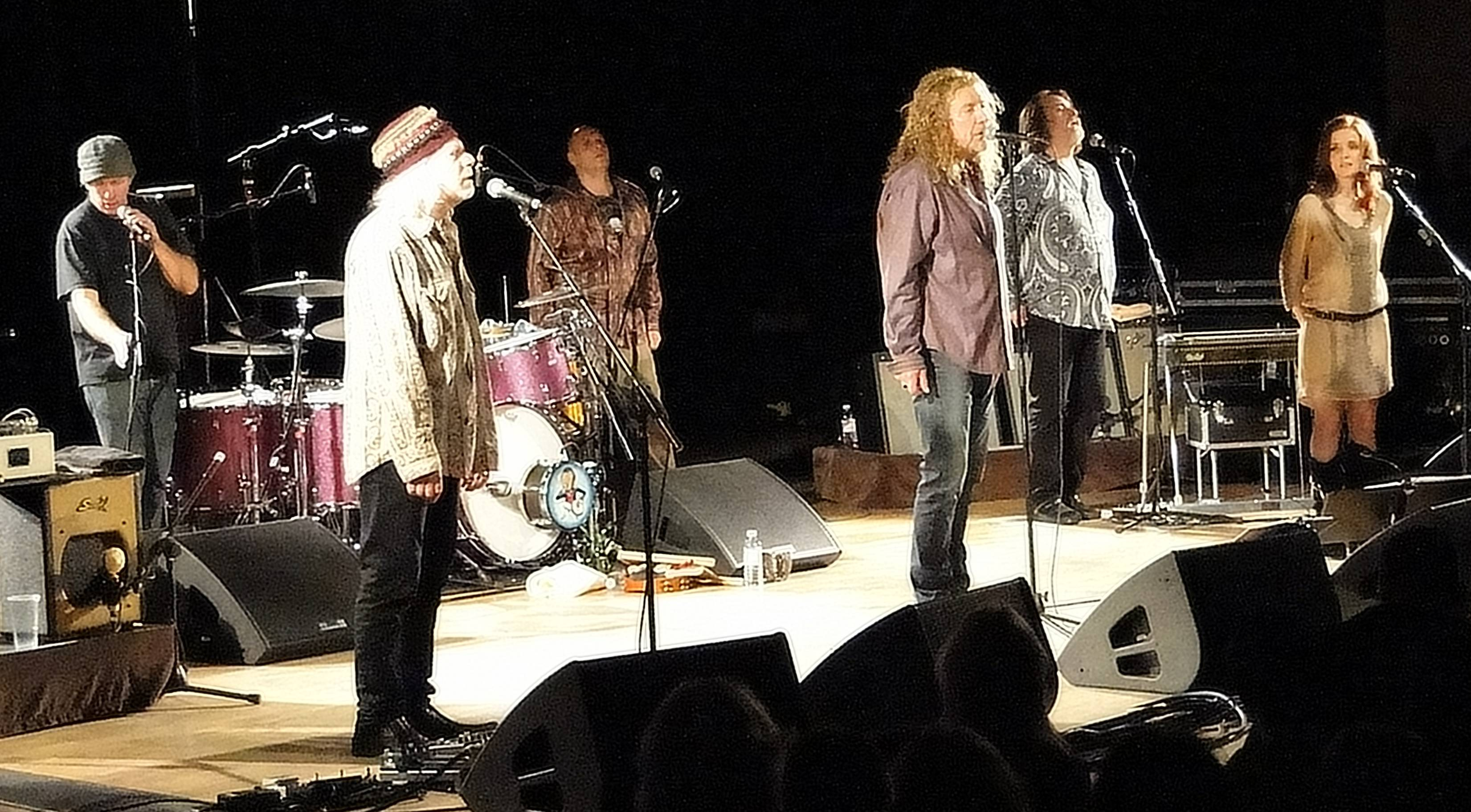
Plant performing live with the Band of Joy (including, most notably, Patty Griffin and Buddy Miller) at Symphony Hall in Birmingham, 2010

In 2010, Plant revived the name Band of Joy for a new group featuring Patty Griffin, Buddy Miller, Darrell Scott, Byron House, and Marco Giovino. The group's album Band of Joy was released in September 2010. It was nominated for Best Americana Album at the 53rd Annual Grammy Awards, and Plant's performance of "Silver Rider" was nominated for Best Solo Rock Vocal Performance.

=== Sensational Space Shifters (2012–2018) ===
Plant formed the Sensational Space Shifters in 2012. The group developed out of his work with Strange Sensation and became the backing band for his next two studio albums, Lullaby and... The Ceaseless Roar (2014) and Carry Fire (2017).

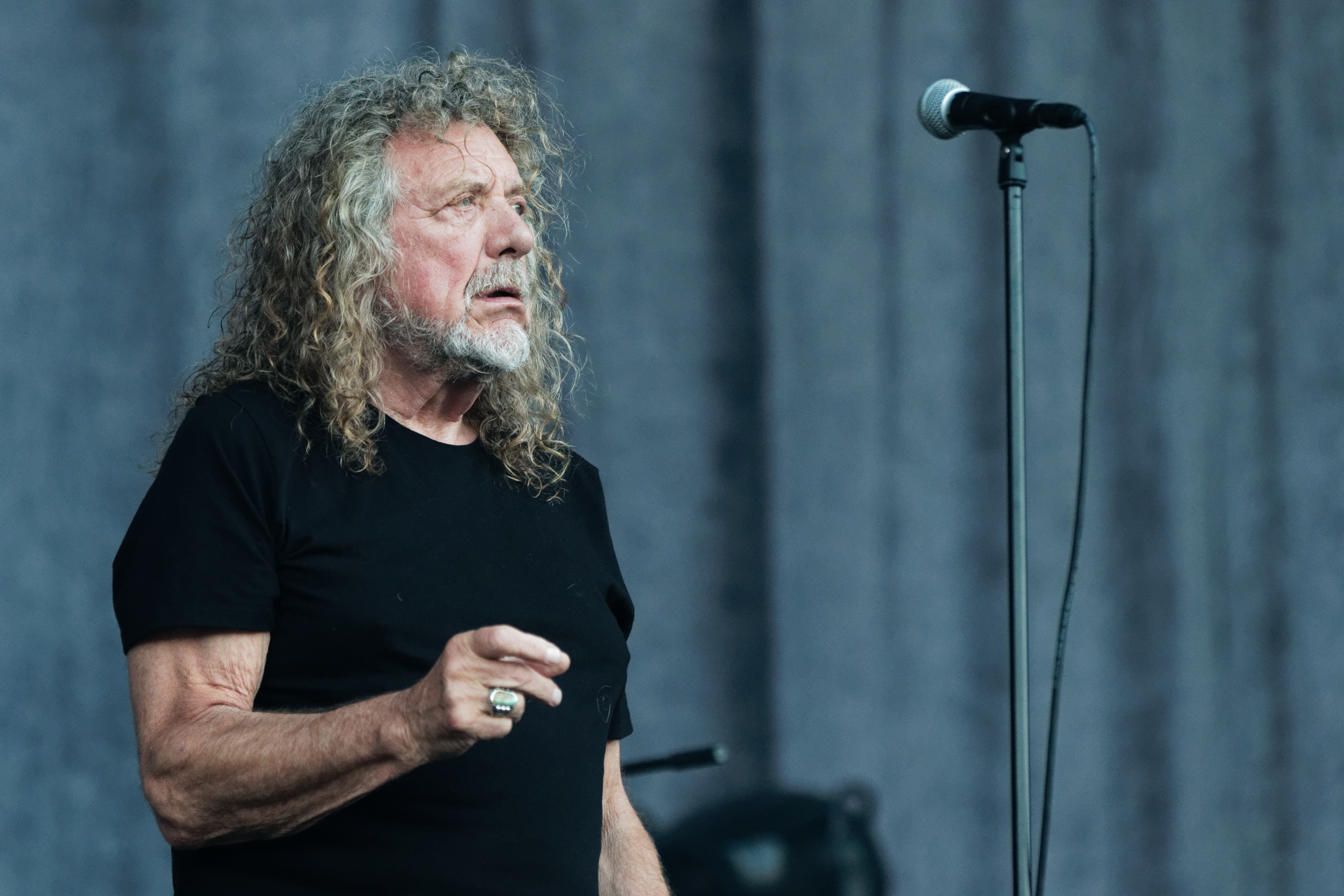
Plant performing live on-stage at a festival in 2018

In 2018, Plant received the Americana Music Association UK's Lifetime Achievement Award.

=== Saving Grace (2019–present) ===
On 7 March 2019, Plant performed at the Third Annual Love Rocks NYC, a benefit concert for God's Love We Deliver at the Beacon Theatre in New York City.

In 2019, Plant formed the acoustic group Saving Grace. A planned North American tour in 2020 was cancelled because of the COVID-19 pandemic. Plant returned to the stage with the band in July 2021 for his first post-pandemic performance.

A remastered vinyl edition of Fate of Nations was released for Record Store Day in 2019. Saving Grace, credited to Robert Plant with Suzi Dian, was his first studio album with the Saving Grace line-up of Dian, Oli Jefferson, Tony Kelsey, Matt Worley, and Barney Morse-Brown. Released by Nonesuch Records on 26 September 2025, it was recorded between April 2019 and January 2025 in the Cotswolds and on the Welsh Borders.

== Led Zeppelin-related projects and reunion rumours ==
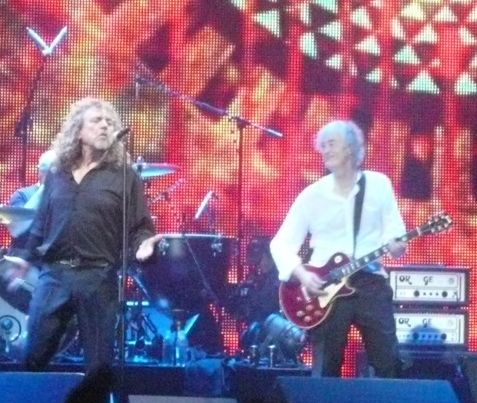
Plant performing with Led Zeppelin at the Ahmed Ertegun Tribute Concert in 2007

Plant performed with surviving members of Led Zeppelin both on 13 July 1985 for Live Aid (with Phil Collins and Tony Thompson on drums simultaneously) and on 15 May 1988 for Atlantic Records 40th anniversary. At the 1988 reunion, Jason Bonham, the son of Led Zeppelin's late drummer John Bonham, played drums. Both sets featured only a few songs, performed with minimal rehearsal. Plant was unhappy with both performances, saying that "it was like sleeping with your ex-wife but not making love." At the 1990 Silver Clef Award Winners Concert at Knebworth Festival, Plant was joined by Jimmy Page. Some of their set was released on the subsequent live album and video. In 1995, Led Zeppelin were inducted into the Rock and Roll Hall of Fame; Plant performed a medley of blues numbers at the induction show with Jimmy Page, John Paul Jones, Jason Bonham, Steven Tyler and Joe Perry of Aerosmith, then they were joined by fellow inductee Neil Young for "When the Levee Breaks".

After years of reunion rumours, Led Zeppelin performed a full two-hour set on 10 December 2007 at the Ahmet Ertegun Tribute Concert, with Jason again filling in on drums. Despite enormous public demand, Plant declined a $200 million offer to tour with Led Zeppelin after the 2007 show. In interviews following the 2007 show, Plant left the door open to possible future performances with Led Zeppelin, saying that he enjoyed the reunion and felt that the show was strong musically. Although Page and Jones have expressed the strong desire to tour as Led Zeppelin, Plant has consistently opposed a full tour and has responded negatively to questions about another reunion. In a January 2008 interview, he stated that he does not want to "tour like a bunch of bored old men following the Rolling Stones around." In a statement on his website in late 2008, Plant stated, "I will not be touring with Led Zeppelin or anyone else for the next two years. Anyone buying Led Zeppelin tickets will be buying bogus tickets."

In February 2013, Plant hinted that he was open to a Led Zeppelin reunion in 2014, though suggesting that he was not the reason for Led Zeppelin's dormancy, saying that Jimmy Page and John Paul Jones "are Capricorns...They're quite contained in their own worlds and they leave it to me", adding that he was "not the bad guy" and that "You need to see the Capricorns – I've got nothing to do in 2014".

In a spring 2014 interview with the BBC about the then forthcoming reissue of Led Zeppelin's first three studio albums, Page said he was sure fans would be keen on another reunion concert, but Plant later replied that "the chances of it happening [were] zero". Page then told The New York Times that he was "fed up" with Plant's refusal to play, stating: "I was told last year that Plant said he is doing nothing in 2014, and what do the other two guys think? Well, he knows what the other guys think. Everyone would love to play more concerts for the band. He's just playing games, and I'm fed up with it, to be honest with you. I don't sing, so I can't do much about it", adding: "I definitely want to play live. Because, you know, I've still got a twinkle in my eye. I can still play. So, yeah, I'll just get myself into musical shape, just concentrating on the guitar."

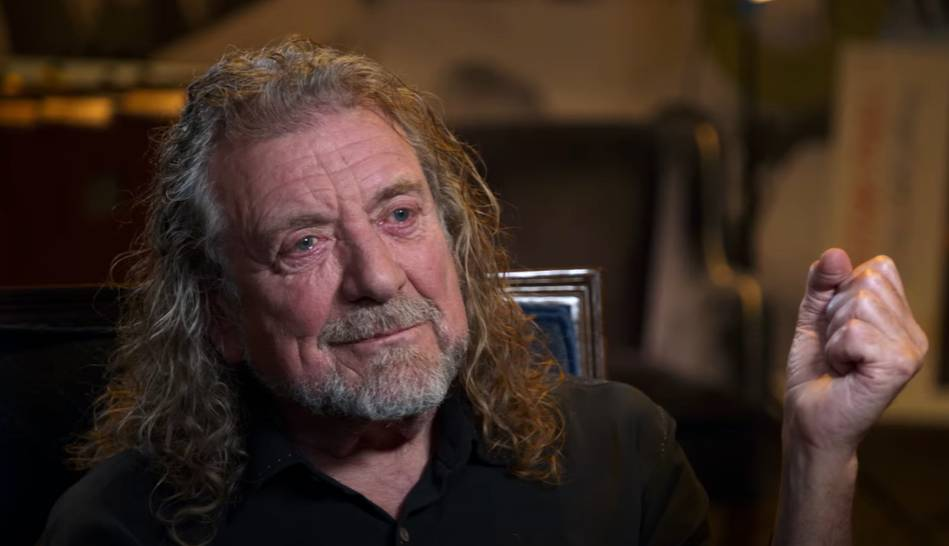
Plant giving an interview to AXS TV in 2021

On 30 July 2014, NME revealed that Plant was "slightly disappointed and baffled" by Page in an ongoing Led Zeppelin dispute during which Page declared he was "fed up" with Plant delaying Led Zeppelin reunion plans. Instead, Plant offered Led Zeppelin's guitarist to write acoustically with him as he is interested in working with Page again but only in an unplugged way. Page responded:

He would have no intention whatsoever of doing it ... I've had enough of all this stuff, to be honest: 'Robert says this, Robert says that.' ... The only reality of it is that we did one concert. No matter how you dress it up, look at the situation. That's it.

In 2025, Plant appeared in the musical documentary Becoming Led Zeppelin, directed by Bernard MacMahon and produced by Allison McGourty. The film chronicled Led Zeppelin's formation and first year and was the first time the band's members had agreed to participate in a biographical documentary.

== Personal life ==
Plant married Maureen Wilson on 9 November 1968. The couple had three children: daughter Carmen Jane (1968) (who later married Charlie Jones, Plant's bassist for solo tours); and sons Karac Pendragon (1972–1977), and Logan Romero (1979). In 1977, during Led Zeppelin's US tour, their five-year-old son, Karac, died of a stomach illness. The song "All My Love", co-written with John Paul Jones, is a tribute to him. The couple divorced in August 1983. In 1991, Plant and Shirley Wilson (sister of ex-wife Maureen) had a son, Jesse Lee. From 1993 to 1995, Plant dated the British-Indian singer Najma Akhtar, who provided vocals on the Page and Plant Unledded tour.

Plant is interested in Welsh history and donated money to the creation of a bronze statue of the last native-born Welsh Prince of Wales Owain Glyndŵr, at St Peter ad Vincula in the village of Pennal in Gwynedd, north-west Wales, unveiled in September 2004. He is also believed to have contributed funds to a slate carving of Glyndŵr's coat of arms at the Celtica museum in Machynlleth. Plant is part of a Glyndŵr network, and attends meetings about him in Wales. In the New Year Honours List 2009, Plant was appointed a Commander of the Order of the British Empire (CBE) "for services to music" and on 10 July 2009 invested by then-Prince of Wales Charles III.

On 14 August 2009, football club Wolverhampton Wanderers announced that Plant had become the club's third vice-president. Plant officially received the honour before kick-off at the club's first match of the season against West Ham United. Plant was five years old when he first visited Molineux Stadium. He recalled in an interview with his local newspaper, the Express & Star, in August 2010: "I was five when my dad took me down for the first time and Billy Wright waved at me. Honest, he did. And that was it – I was hooked from that moment." In late 2010, BBC Two aired a documentary titled Robert Plant: By Myself. It features Plant discussing his journey with Led Zeppelin and various projects since.

In a July 2012 interview with The Independent, Plant stated he had "eloped and ran off to Texas" with the American singer Patty Griffin. Plant's UK-based manager later told E! News that Plant was apparently being cheeky when he used the word "eloped" to describe his home life, for "Robert has not married Patty Griffin," instead "He was just referring to the fact that he's been residing in Texas" with her. According to a July 2012 Ultimate Classic Rock article, Plant and Griffin had been dating for over a year, spending half of their time together in Austin, Texas. On 23 August 2014, The Independent indicated Plant had broken up with Griffin: "Patty and I tried a sort of zig-zag across the Atlantic," Plant told the publication, "but she didn't share my penchant for cider and she used to marvel at the Black Country character I became after four pints of Thatchers. My feelings are very much ones of sadness and regret."

In early 2013, Plant contributed to a community buyout scheme to save the music venue, The Bell Inn, in Bath, Somerset. He currently resides at Shatterford, near Bewdley in the Wyre Forest District of Worcestershire. In 2020, Plant donated money towards frontline medical supplies during the COVID-19 pandemic. The money went to the GoFundMe page of a small clothing manufacturer in Kidderminster, England that makes scrubs for local hospitals.

== Legacy ==
Plant has influenced the style of many of his contemporaries, including Geddy Lee of Rush, Ann Wilson of Heart, Sammy Hagar of Van Halen, and later rock vocalists such as Jeff Buckley and Jack White of the White Stripes who imitated his performing style. Freddie Mercury of Queen and Axl Rose of Guns N' Roses were influenced by Plant. The Encyclopædia Britannica notes that "Exaggerating the vocal style and expressive palette of blues singers such as Howlin' Wolf and Muddy Waters, Plant created the sound that has defined much hard rock and heavy metal singing: a high range, an abundance of distortion, loud volume, and emotional excess". Plant received the Knebworth Silver Clef Award in 1990.

In 2006, the hard rock and heavy metal magazine Hit Parader named Plant as No. 1 on its list of the 100 Greatest Metal Vocalists of All Time, a list that included Rob Halford of Judas Priest (No. 2), Steven Tyler (No. 3), Freddie Mercury (No. 6), Geddy Lee (No. 13) and Paul Stanley of Kiss (No. 18), all of whom were influenced by Plant. In 2008, Rolling Stone named Plant the 15th-greatest singer of all time on their list of 100 Greatest Singers of All Time. In 2009, he was voted the "greatest voice in rock" in a poll conducted by Planet Rock. He was included in the Q's 2009 list of "Artists of the Century" and was ranked at number 8 in their list of "100 Greatest Singers" in 2007. In 2009, Plant also won the Outstanding Contribution to Music prize at the Q Awards. He was placed at No. 3 on Spin's list of "The 50 Greatest Rock Frontmen of All Time".

On 20 September 2010, NPR named Plant as one of the 50 Great Voices in the world. In July 2018, Plant won the Silver Cleff Integro Outstanding Award, announced by music charity Nordoff Robbins. On 15 March 2022, Plant was the guest on BBC Radio 4's Desert Island Discs. His musical choices included "I Ain't Superstitious" by Howlin' Wolf and "Ohio" by Crosby, Stills, Nash & Young. His book choice was The Earliest English Poems, translated by Michael Alexander, his luxury item was a basket containing photos of homing pigeons and his favourite musical piece was "Serenade" by the American tenor and actor Mario Lanza.

== Discography ==
Studio albums

- Pictures at Eleven (1982)
- The Principle of Moments (1983)
- Shaken 'n' Stirred (1985)
- Now and Zen (1988)
- Manic Nirvana (1990)
- Fate of Nations (1993)
- Dreamland (2002)
- Mighty ReArranger (2005)
- Band of Joy (2010)
- Lullaby and the Ceaseless Roar (2014)
- Carry Fire (2017)
- Saving Grace (2025)

Compilation albums

- Sixty Six to Timbuktu (2003)
- Nine Lives (Box Set) (2006)
- Digging Deep: Subterranea (2020)

Collaborative albums

- The Honeydrippers: Volume One (1984) (with Jimmy Page and Jeff Beck)
- No Quarter: Jimmy Page and Robert Plant Unledded (1994) (live album with Jimmy Page)
- Walking into Clarksdale (1998) (with Jimmy Page)
- Raising Sand (2007) (with Alison Krauss)
- Raise the Roof (2021) (with Alison Krauss)

Awards
Preceded by Patty Griffin	AMA Album of the Year (artist); 2008 with Alison Krauss	Succeeded by Buddy & Julie Miller
Preceded by The Avett Brothers	AMA Duo/Group of the Year; 2008 with Alison Krauss	Succeeded by Buddy & Julie Miller
Preceded by Robert Plant & Alison Krauss	Grammy Awards for Pop Collaboration With Vocals; 2009 with Alison Krauss	Succeeded by Jason Mraz & Colbie Caillat
