= List of Adventure Soft games =

The following is a list of games developed by Adventure Soft.

== Video games ==
=== As Horror Soft ===
Game	Details
Personal Nightmare Original release date: January 1, 1989	Release years by system: 1989 – Amiga, Atari ST, MS-DOS; 2009 – Windows; 2012 – MacOS
Personal Nightmare Original release date: January 1, 1989	Notes: Point-and-click adventure, Survival horror; Self-published by Horror soft
Elvira: Mistress of the Dark Original release date: March 1990	Release years by system: 1990 – Amiga, MS-DOS; 1991 – Atari ST, Commodore 64; 1992 – PC-98
Elvira: Mistress of the Dark Original release date: March 1990	Notes: Point-and-click adventure, Survival horror, role-playing game; Published by Accolade, Inc.; Part of the Elvira franchise; Included in the compilation Elvira's Horror Pack
Elvira II: The Jaws of Cerberus Original release date: 1992	Release years by system: 1992 – Amiga, Atari ST, Commodore 64, MS-DOS
Elvira II: The Jaws of Cerberus Original release date: 1992	Notes: Point-and-click adventure, Survival horror, role-playing game; Published by Accolade, Inc.; Part of the Elvira franchise; Sequel to Elvira: Mistress of the Dark; Included in the compilation Elvira's Horror Pack
Waxworks Original release date: 1992	Release years by system: 1992 – Amiga, MS-DOS; 2009 – Windows; 2012 – MacOS
Waxworks Original release date: 1992	Notes: Point-and-click adventure, Survival horror, role-playing game; Published by Accolade, Inc.; Included in the compilation Elvira's Horror Pack

=== As Adventure Soft ===
Game	Details
Captain America in: The Doom Tube of Dr. Megalomann Original release date: 1987	Release years by system: 1987 – Commodore 64, Amstrad CPC; 1988 – Atari ST, ZX Spectrum
Captain America in: The Doom Tube of Dr. Megalomann Original release date: 1987	Notes: Action; Published by U.S. Gold on their Go! label; The first video game to feature Captain America
Simon the Sorcerer Original release date: September 27, 1993	Release years by system: 1993 – MS-DOS; 1994 – Amiga, Amiga CD32, RISC OS; 2002 – Windows; 2009 – iOS; 2012 – MacOS; 2013 – Android
Simon the Sorcerer Original release date: September 27, 1993	Notes: Point-and-click adventure; Self-published by Adventure Soft; Part of the Simon the Sorcerer series; Included in the compilation Simon the Sorcerer I & II; Included in the compilation Simon the Sorcerer Double Pack
Simon the Sorcerer II: The Lion, the Wizard and the Wardrobe Original release date: November 1995	Release years by system: 1995 – MS-DOS, Windows; 2000 – MacOS; 2001 – AmigaOS; 2009 – iOS; 2014 – Android
Simon the Sorcerer II: The Lion, the Wizard and the Wardrobe Original release date: November 1995	Notes: Point-and-click adventure; Self-published by Adventure Soft; Part of the Simon the Sorcerer series; Sequel to Simon the Sorcerer; Included in the compilation Simon the Sorcerer I & II; Included in the compilation Simon the Sorcerer Double Pack
The Feeble Files Original release date: June 1997	Release years by system: 1997 – Windows; 2002 – AmigaOS; 2003 – MacOS
The Feeble Files Original release date: June 1997	Notes: Adventure game; Self-published by Adventure Soft
Simon The Sorcerer's Puzzle Pack Original release date: August 20, 1998	Release years by system: 1998 – Windows
Simon The Sorcerer's Puzzle Pack Original release date: August 20, 1998	Notes: Puzzle games; Self-published by Adventure Soft; Part of the Simon the Sorcerer series; Included in the compilation Simon the Sorcerer Double Pack
Simon the Sorcerer's Pinball Original release date: November 1998	Release years by system: 1998 – Windows
Simon the Sorcerer's Pinball Original release date: November 1998	Notes: Pinball game; Self-published by Adventure Soft; Part of the Simon the Sorcerer series; Included in the compilation Simon the Sorcerer Double Pack
Simon the Sorcerer 3D Original release date: 2001	Release years by system: 2001 – Windows
Simon the Sorcerer 3D Original release date: 2001	Notes: Adventure game; Developed by Headfirst Productions, published by Adventure Soft; Sequel to Simon the Sorcerer II: The Lion, the Wizard and the Wardrobe
