= The Feeble Files =

1997 video game

- Developer: Adventure Soft
- Publishers: Adventure Soft; MacPlay
- Director: Michael Woodroffe
- Producer: Michael Woodroffe
- Designer: Simon Woodroffe
- Programmer: Alan Bridgman
- Writer: Simon Woodroffe
- Composers: David R. Punshon; Graham Crabb
- Platforms: Windows, Mac, Amiga, WarpOS
- Release: June 1997
- Genre: Adventure
- Mode: Single-player

The Feeble Files is a 1997 adventure video game developed and published by Adventure Soft for Microsoft Windows, and republished by MacPlay for Macintosh in 2001 in Europe and 2002 in the United States. The game is a comedic science fiction title in which players assume the role of Feeble, an alien tasked with burning crop circles across the galaxy. Adventure Soft began development of the game after seeking different subject matter to their Simon the Sorcerer series of adventure games. The studio pivoted to 3D computer graphics, creating animations using Silicon Graphics hardware. Drawing from science fiction literature and television as inspiration, the studio hired Red Dwarf actor Robert Llewelyn to provide voice acting for the titular protagonist.

Upon release, The Feeble Files received a generally positive reception, with reviewers praising the game's writing, sense of humor and performances, and criticism directed at its puzzle design, difficulty and interface. Some reviewers of the Mac version remarked that the game's visuals had dated poorly by the time of release. The game was republished for GOG.com in December 2008.

== Gameplay ==
For interaction the game uses a point-and-click navigation system synonymous with adventure games. The player is in control of the main character, Feeble, and must solve various puzzles to advance through the game and complete his quest. The player later gets the opportunity to use SAM, a robot with a penchant for genocide, to solve certain puzzles in the game. When using SAM the players cursor changes and different options are available to interact with objects in the environment, adding more depth to the gameplay.

At one point during the game the player must win several arcade games in order to advance, but these games use completely different gameplay methods and often proved to be difficult for players. In the end Adventure Soft released a saved game just after the arcade section to allow people to carry on playing.

The story and puzzles within the game are all of a linear nature.

== Plot ==
The Feeble Files is loosely based on elements of the dystopian novel Nineteen Eighty-Four by George Orwell which describes a government and society similar to Feeble's and features a protagonist with similar ambitions as Feeble's.

=== Characters ===
- Feeble: A young and able scientist at the Ministry of Galactic Uncertainty (Crop Circle Division) whose main task is to travel to far corners of the galaxy, such as Earth's solar system, in order to covertly burn circles in crop fields. The purpose of this activity, according to the in-game encyclopaedia, is to stimulate curiosity and paranoia about the universe in a planet's inhabitants, and thereby the development of science and technology, such that the planet will eventually become valuable enough to be worth invading and assimilating. After another day at work, Feeble encounters an asteroid field on his way back and accidentally crashes into a Voyager space probe, which in turn crashes into his workplace, thus getting him in serious trouble and, eventually, into the Freedom Fighters.
- Dolores: A freedom fighter who recruits Feeble into their ranks, helping him out of prison first. Tough, resourceful and persistent, she makes a model of a rebel. She is of the same species as Feeble, though is much taller than him (apart from his brother, their mother and their grandfather, there are no other Grenelons in the game). Dolores is a playable character in a short sequence of the game, the only one to employ a FPS kind of gameplay.
- SAM: A 13-class intercepting robot, SAM is discovered by Dolores on board the prison vessel, shortly after their crash landing on the planet Filb. As a deadly dangerous and always willing to fight robot, SAM's relationship with the peaceful Feeble is, at first, rather shaky, though after a while they learn to get along quite well. SAM is the second playable character after Feeble.

=== Institutions ===
- OmniBrain: The OmniBrain is the governing power of the galaxy, controlling and seeing everything via the all-powerful OmniCorporation and its tortuous bureaucracy, and the sinister Enforcers. The game states "he considers all life forms everywhere to be his citizens, and he loves them and cares for them in the way that is best for them, and wants them all to be happy. Praise be to the OmniBrain!" This fine line between a god and a dictatorship is explored at many points throughout the game. The OmniBrain is an obvious reference to Orwell's Big Brother.
- OmniCorporation: Widely known as the Company, the OmniCorporation is the ruling body of Feeble's universe and its actual existence, unlike the OmniBrain's, is unquestionable. One of the Company's main objectives is to ensure that all citizens remain loyal and happy. The former is achieved by providing the citizens with various types of substances that lower one's abilities to think critically of the society they see around them. The latter is implemented by the so-called Happy Bots who patrol the city of Metro Prime, killing everybody that seems upset, even if the reason for their anxiety is by no means concerned with politics. The Company's counterpart in Orwell's novel is the Party.
- Ministry of Galactic Uncertainty: Feeble works for the Ministry of Galactic Uncertainty (Crop Circle Division). It is his job to fly to undeveloped planets, such as Earth, and create crop circles in order to increase the indigenous population's paranoia and uncertainty about the universe. This is to stimulate greater scientific investigation and technological development, until the planet is sufficiently advanced that it is ready to be absorbed by the OmniCorporation.
- Freedom Fighters: A group of rebels whose main and, apparently, only objective is to bring down the Company and the OmniBrain. The rebels have spent years trying to track down the OmniBrain's exact location in order to destroy him. The Freedom Fighters try to maintain contact with the population (and, possibly, recruit new members) by spreading Traitor TV, a TV channel outside the Company's control. The group is made up mostly of partisans and the game hints that in the course of their anti-Company struggle they have not refrained from killing civilians. The Freedom Fighters' means of recruiting new members are cautious: the potential candidate is watched closely by one of the partisans and if he or she proves able to think independently and might serve to the rebels' cause, contact is established. Afterward, his or her Oracle is uploaded with a rebel version of the Encyclopedia (which might be a reference to Goldstein's book in Nineteen Eighty-Four). In such a way Feeble was recruited by Dolores. The Freedom Fighters refer to one another as comrades and they might have been based on communist guerillas.
- Cygnus Alpha: The Company's most prominent penitentiary colony on board which hundreds of citizens are gradually brainwashed and deprived of all independent thoughts and feelings but unswerving love for the OmniBrain. The Cygnus Alpha security system comprises a network of screens that display a hypnotyzing spiral from time to time so as to make sure that no prisoner has time to think clearly for a longer period. The inmates divide their time into sleeping, eating disgusting food, watching TV and working on an assembly line that construct Company propaganda devices.
- Filb: A C-class planet outside the OmniCorporation, inhabited by a race of primitive blue aliens who worship as a god the only operative of the only Company outpost on the planet, Feeble's hated brother, Filbert, who uses them as test subjects for his experiments.
- Directives: Directives are rules created by the OmniBrain to make the world better; there are over a million of them. As the game progresses a record is kept of all the rules that Feeble has broken.

== Development and release ==
=== Development ===
The Feeble Files was developed by Adventure Soft, a British game development company created by Mike and Simon Woodroffe, who had previously released the Simon the Sorcerer series of games. Simon stated that The Feeble Files was conceived shortly after release of Simon the Sorcerer II as a subtler and more mature concept, as a means to expand his horizons as a writer, and "have a break" from the series to explore new characters and ideas. It was inspired by science fiction literature including The Hitchhiker's Guide to the Galaxy, 1984 and Brave New World. British science fiction television was also an influence; Simon was influenced by Blake's 7, Doctor Who, and Red Dwarf, and the game featured the voice acting of Red Dwarf actor Robert Llewellyn as the protagonist.

Development of The Feeble Files was undertaken by Simon and Michael Woodroffe as leads, with additional staff including programmer Alan Bridgman and a team of twelve graphic artists. The studio incurred great cost in investing in Silicon Graphics workstations and staff training to implement the 3D computer graphics for the characters and backgrounds, which were some of the earliest in an adventure game. These were rendered in 3D in Super VGA, animated using PowerAnimator, and converted into 2D sprites in a method similar to Donkey Kong Country. The title of The Feeble Files was satirical and influenced by the film Meet The Feebles and the television show The X-Files; in Germany the game and its protagonist were renamed to Floyd: There are Still Heroes.

=== Release ===
The Feeble Files was released in Europe in 1997. A Macintosh-only United States release was published by MacPlay in 2002. Simon stated that the game was not a commercial success, and it and the commercial failure of its successor Simon the Sorcerer 3D exhausted the company's internal funding. In 2006, the game was included as part of the open-source program ScummVM, allowing users to play the game on various systems. The game was remastered and rereleased on GOG.com in 2008.

== Reception ==
=== Reviews ===
Reception

Review scores
Publication	Score
Adventure Gamers	4/5
Computer Games Strategy Plus	4/5
Computer and Video Games	2/5
IGN	5.8/10
PC Gamer (UK)	63%
PC PowerPlay	73%
PC Zone	50%
Inside Mac Games	7/10
New Age Gaming	80%

The Feeble Files received generally positive reviews. Critics generally enjoyed the game's writing and sense of humour, and praised its distinctly British voice acting and accents. 'Writing that British accents complemented the "drily humorous" tone of The Feeble Files, Adventure Gamers enjoyed the comic relief of the game and praised its worldbuilding and attention to detail. John Altman of Computer Games Strategy Plus praised the game's charm and wit, highlighting the game's variation between satire, slapstick, and "deliciously edgy" and "darker" undertone. In contrast, PC Zone found the game's irony and pop-culture references tiresome, stating its "heavily referential" nature indicated its creators were "short on original ideas".

Reviewers expressed a mixed assessment of the graphics, with some praising it, and others finding them lacking; reviews of the 2003 Mac version noting the graphics had dated poorly. The game's interface also received criticism, with Adventure Gamers stating inventory navigation and use of separate menus for picking up, using, and combining objects "totally unnecessary and counter-intuitive".

However, the gameplay and puzzle design garnered a generally negative reception, with critics highlighting their difficulty; PC Gamer UK called them "downright obscure and completely unfathomable". Atman wrote that the puzzles were unfair, overly difficult and not integrated into the game's plot. Gareth Jones of PC PowerPlay remarked that the hint system "could have been a little more explicit" due to their vague instructions. Several critics felt the player character's movement speed slowed the pace of the game. The minigames also were critiqued.

=== Retrospective reception ===
Describing the game as "funny" but "an overwhelmingly difficult, massively frustrating experience that points to nearly everything that was wrong with adventure game design", Kurt Kalata of Hardcore Gaming 101 critiqued The Feeble Files, finding that its interface design, difficulty, and the tedium of the puzzles outweighed the quality of its visuals or writing. In a separate analysis of the game's opening puzzles, Kalata critiqued its design for involving too many secondary goals with solutions that did not make sense. Richard Moss of Ars Technica wrote that the game "had a fantastic concept and great humor, although its overall design was less impressive".

== See also ==
- The Space Bar
