= Simon the Sorcerer 4: Chaos Happens =

2007 video game

- Developer: Silver Style Entertainment
- Publishers: RTL Enterprises (Germany); Playlogic Entertainment (Europe)
- Series: Simon the Sorcerer
- Platform: Microsoft Windows
- Release: GER: February 23, 2007; EU: March 31, 2008
- Genre: Adventure
- Mode: Single-player

Simon the Sorcerer 4: Chaos Happens (German: Simon the Sorcerer: Chaos ist das halbe Leben) is an adventure game developed by Silver Style Entertainment. It was released by RTL Enterprises in February 2007 for Microsoft Windows.

== Plot ==
After being knocked out by his little brother with a remote control, Simon has a vision of Alix (the buxom granddaughter of Calypso and his longtime crush) telling him the Magic Kingdom is in danger.

Simon instantly climbs into his dimension travelling wardrobe to go and investigate. On arrival he meets a distinctly undistressed Alix who not only has no idea what danger our hero is talking about but who also seems to think she's been dating Simon for months (or at least since the end of Simon the Sorcerer 3D) and wants to dump him for being too boring.

== Reception ==
Eurogamer acknowledged the game was an improvement over the previous version but remained overly simplistic at times. Metacritic lists an average score of 50 out of 100.
