= Enciso =

Enciso may refer to:

== Places ==
- Enciso, La Rioja, a municipality in Spain
  - Enciso Group, a geological formation in La Rioja, Spain, near the village of Enciso
- Enciso, Santander, a municipality in Colombia

== People ==
- Álvar Enciso (born 1974), Spanish rugby union player
- Diego Jiménez de Enciso (1585–1634), playwright of the Spanish Golden Age
- Izaac Enciso (born 1980), Mexican artist
- Julio César Enciso (footballer, born 1974), Paraguayan association football player
- Julio Enciso (footballer, born 2004), Paraguayan association football player
- Leonardo Enciso (born 1981), Colombian association football player
- Luis Miguel Enciso Recio (1930–2018), Spanish historian and politician
- Martín Fernández de Enciso (c. 1469–1533), Spanish navigator and geographer
- Sabrina Enciso (born 1999), American association football player
- Simon Enciso (born 1991), Filipino basketball player
- Wilson Rogelio Enciso (born 1958), Colombian writer and cultural manager
