= Big Log =

1983 single by Robert Plant

Single by Robert Plant

from the album The Principle of Moments
- B-side: "Messin' with the Mekon" (UK); "Far Post" (US)
- Released: July 1983
- Recorded: 1983
- Studio: Rockfield Studios (Monmouth, Wales)
- Genre: Soft rock; art rock
- Length: 5:03
- Label: Es Paranza; Atlantic
- Songwriter(s): Robert Plant; Robbie Blunt; Jezz Woodroffe
- Producer(s): Robert Plant; Benji LeFevre; Pat Moran

Robert Plant singles chronology
"Pledge Pin" (1982)	"Big Log" (1983)	"In the Mood" (1983)

"Big Log" is a song by the English recording artist Robert Plant. The first single from his second solo studio album, The Principle of Moments (1983), it became his first top 40 solo hit, peaking at No. 11 on the UK Singles Chart and No. 20 on the US Billboard Hot 100. The song also reached No. 6 on the Billboard Top Tracks chart. Neither of the words in the title appears in the lyrics.

== Background ==
"I was messing about with the TR-808 drum machine and came up with the drum pattern and hand claps," recalled cowriter Jezz Woodroffe. "Robbie (Blunt, guitarist) arrived, liked the groove, and very quickly we had the main chords. The middle eight came from my Godwin string synth machine, and Robbie came up with the haunting theme. 'Big Log' was written in the middle of winter. We'd run out of fuel for the fire. We found the remains of an old tree lying outside, which was about 15 feet long, but had nothing to cut it with. So we put one end in the fire and slowly burnt it, till it was hollow."

== Music video ==
The video for the song was filmed around California and Nevada, including the Amargosa Opera House and Hotel in Death Valley Junction, California, the Calico Ghost Town in California, the Glass Pool Inn in Las Vegas, and in Crystal, Nye County, Nevada. It was directed by Storm Thorgerson.

== Critical reception ==
Cash Box compared the synthesized drums and claps to Marvin Gaye's "Sexual Healing" and praised Plant's vocal.

== Track listing ==
- UK 7" single

A: "Big Log" (Plant, Blunt, Woodroffe) – 5:03
B: "Messin' with the Mekon" (Plant, Blunt, Paul Martinez) – 4:40

- US 7" single

A: "Big Log" (Plant, Blunt, Woodroffe) – 5:03
B: "Far Post" (Plant, Blunt, Woodroffe) – 4:44

== Chart performance ==
=== Weekly charts ===
Chart (1983)	Peak position
Australia (Kent Music Report)	23
Belgium (Ultratop 50 Flanders)	5
Netherlands (Dutch Top 40)	4
Netherlands (Single Top 100)	5
New Zealand (Recorded Music NZ)	7
UK Singles (OCC)	11
US Billboard Hot 100	20

=== Year-end charts ===
Chart (1983)	Position
Belgium (Ultratop Flanders)	61
Netherlands (Dutch Top 40)	23
Netherlands (Single Top 100)	37

== Other versions ==
Bassist Viktor Krauss covered "Big Log" on his 2004 album Far from Enough. Krauss' sister Alison – who recorded Raising Sand with Plant three years later – sang lead vocals.
