= Burning Down One Side =

Single by Robert Plant

from the album Pictures at Eleven
- B-side: "Moonlight in Samosa"
- Released: September 1982
- Recorded: 1982
- Studio: Rockfield Studios (Monmouth, Wales)
- Genre: Rock; arena rock
- Length: 3:55
- Label: Swan Song
- Songwriters: Robert Plant; Robbie Blunt; Jezz Woodroffe
- Producer: Robert Plant

Robert Plant singles chronology
"Burning Down One Side" (1982)	"Pledge Pin" (1982)

Music video
- "Burning Down One Side" on YouTube

"Burning Down One Side" is a song by the English rock singer Robert Plant from his debut solo studio album, Pictures at Eleven (1982). It was the most popular track from the album on album-oriented rock radio in the United States, peaking at No. 3 on the Billboard Top Tracks chart in 1982. Later released as the first single from the album, it only managed to reach No. 64 on the Billboard Hot 100 and No. 73 on the UK singles chart. The UK B-side "Far Post" was a moderate AOR (album-oriented rock) radio hit in the US, reaching No. 12 on the Top Tracks chart in January 1983. This song features Genesis' Phil Collins on drums, as do many other songs off this same album. The song plays at 113 BPM in 4/4 time signature.

== Track listing ==
- UK and US 7" Single

A1: "Burning Down One Side" (Robert Plant, Robbie Blunt, Jezz Woodroffe) – 3:55
B1: "Moonlight in Samosa" (Plant, Blunt) – 3:58

- UK 12" Single

A1: "Burning Down One Side" (Plant, Blunt, Woodroffe) – 3:55
B1: "Moonlight in Samosa" (Plant, Blunt) – 3:58
B2: "Far Post" (Plant, Blunt, Woodroffe) – 4:42
