= Rebel Planet =

Fighting Fantasy roleplaying gamebook

- Cover of the first edition
- Author: Robin Waterfield
- Illustrator: Gary Mayes
- Cover artist: Alan Craddock
- Series: Fighting Fantasy: Puffin number: 18
- Genre: Science fiction Location: Space
- Published: 1985
- Media type: Print (Paperback)
- ISBN: 0-14-031952-2 (Puffin)

Rebel Planet is a single-player roleplaying gamebook written by Robin Waterfield, illustrated by Gary Mayes and originally published in 1985 by Puffin Books. It forms part of Steve Jackson and Ian Livingstone's Fighting Fantasy series. It is the 18th in the series in the original Puffin series (ISBN 0-14-031952-2). There are currently no announced plans to republish the book as part of the modern Wizard series.

== Plot ==
Rebel Planet is a science fiction adventure set in the year 2453. In this fictional representation of the future, human colonisation of the galaxy began in 2070 with the settlement of Tropos a few light-years from Earth. Earth and her colonies were conquered by an alien race known as the Arcadians in a twelve-year war around 2300. Humans have become slaves, and are kept alive only to serve their alien masters.

However, a human organization known as SAROS ("Search And Research Of Space") has discovered that the Arcadians rely on a powerful super-computer to keep themselves networked together. Without this computer, they are merely zombies, incapable of acting on their own. SAROS has limited resources, but a secret plot is hatched to infiltrate Arcadion and destroy the queen computer. The reader plays the role of the last hope of humanity, an undercover agent posing as a space merchant.

== Other media ==
The book was loosely adapted into an Adventure Soft text adventure game Rebel Planet for the ZX Spectrum, Commodore 64, Amstrad CPC, BBC Micro and Acorn Electron home computers (published by US Gold).
