= Fat Lip (disambiguation) =

"Fat Lip" is a 2001 song by Sum 41.

Fat Lip may refer to:

- A slang term for a swollen lip
- "Fat Lip", a song by Robert Plant from his 1982 album Pictures at Eleven
- "Fat Lip," a song by Rocket from the Crypt from their 1995 album Scream, Dracula, Scream!
- Fatlip (born 1969), rapper and member of the group The Pharcyde
