= Simon the Sorcerer: Who'd Even Want Contact =

2009 video game

Simon the Sorcerer: Who'd Even Want Contact?!
- English cover art
- Developer: Silver Style Entertainment
- Series: Simon the Sorcerer
- Platform: Microsoft Windows
- Release: EU: March 26, 2009; NA: 2010
- Genre: Adventure
- Mode: Single-player

Simon the Sorcerer: Who'd Even Want Contact?! (German: Simon the Sorcerer: Wer will schon Kontakt?), also known as Simon the Sorcerer 5, is an adventure game developed by Silver Style Entertainment. It was released in 2009 for Microsoft Windows. The game is no longer available to download as the company who published went into insolvency.

== Reception ==
Jack Allin, on Adventure Gamers, gave the game 3.5 stars out of 5, praising the interesting locations and art style, but criticising the mediocre humour and forgettable characters.
