= Seas of Blood =

Role-playing gamebook

- Original Puffin Books cover (1985)
- Author: Andrew Chapman
- Illustrator: Bob Harvey
- Cover artist: Rodney Matthews
- Series: Fighting Fantasy: Puffin number: 16
- Genre: Fantasy
- Published: 1985
- Media type: Print (Paperback)
- ISBN: 0-14-031951-4 (Puffin)

Seas of Blood is a single-player roleplaying gamebook written by Andrew Chapman, illustrated by Bob Harvey and originally published in 1985 by Puffin Books. It forms part of Steve Jackson and Ian Livingstone's Fighting Fantasy series. It is the 16th in the series in the original Puffin series (ISBN 0-14-031951-4). The title was loosely adapted into a text-based video game by company Adventure Soft.

== Rules ==
The story features an additional game mechanic: both the player's character and their ship have attributes for combat, as there is a combination of land and sea-based combat.

== Story ==
The player takes the role of the captain of the pirate vessel Banshee, and within a 50-day period must overcome both land and sea adversaries to reach the isle of Nippur, in possession of more gold than rival Abdul the Butcher.

== Other media ==
The book was loosely adapted into an Adventure Soft text adventure game Seas of Blood for the ZX Spectrum, Commodore 64, and Amstrad CPC.
