= Sordid =

Sordid may refer to:

- Paul Sordid (20th century), English drummer
- Sordid (character), a fictional character in the Simon the Sorcerer series of video games
