= Elvira: Mistress of the Dark (video game) =

1990 video game

- Cover art for the Atari ST
- Developer: Horror Soft
- Publisher: Accolade
- Designers: Alan Bridgman; Keith Wadhamsa; Michael Woodroffe; Simon Woodroffe
- Artists: Paul Drummond; Michael Landreth; Philip Nixon
- Composer: Dave Hasler
- Engine: AberMUD (modified)
- Platforms: Amiga, Atari ST, Commodore 64, MS-DOS
- Release: March 1990
- Genres: Adventure, role-playing
- Mode: Single-player

Elvira: Mistress of the Dark is a horror adventure/role-playing video game developed by Horror Soft and released by Accolade in 1990 for the Amiga, Atari ST, Commodore 64 and MS-DOS computers. It was Horror Soft's second published game after 1989's Personal Nightmare and stars the actress Cassandra Peterson as her character Elvira.

In Mistress of the Dark, Elvira is held captive by dark forces in the castle of her ancestor, Lady Emelda. The player's character is to enter the castle to rescue Elvira and prevent the imminent return of the long-dead evil sorceress. The well-received game was followed by Elvira II: The Jaws of Cerberus in 1991 and the spiritual successor Waxworks in 1992.

== Plot ==
The game begins following events of the 1988 film Elvira, Mistress of the Dark. After the death of her evil Uncle Vincent, Elvira has inherited Killbragant Castle and has restored it to its former glory, planning to turn it into a tourist attraction for horror fans. However, while doing this, Elvira has inadvertently awakened a horde of monstrous followers of her distant ancestor, the powerful wicked witch Emelda. The monsters imprisoned Elvira in the castle and began preparations to use her for the return of their mistress. The player's character has been called upon to help by Elvira to help her prevent Emelda's resurrection. The evil sorceress died centuries ago before she could take over and rule the world, but has made a pact with the devil to be brought back to life in the future. In the beginning of the game, the player is captured by the sorceress's undead minions. He is then rescued by Elvira and asked to help get her powers back, and to find a way to send Emelda back to hell before it is too late.

== Gameplay ==
Combat gameplay

Elvira is a mix of first-person shooter role-playing game and point-and-click adventure game. The player will navigate around a castle and its grounds sent by Elvira to find six special keys to retrieve a magical dagger and scroll to kill Lady Emelda. In the exploration mode, the player will be able to traverse a room/passage at four different angles. In each angle the player can make use of ten verbal commands to pick up items, interact with objects or use items on objects. Puzzles are solved by using some items in correct situations. The player can be killed if incorrect procedures are done or face hostile encounters unprepared.

When faced with an enemy, the gameplay mode will switch to combat mode. How well the player does defeating an opponent, depends on various conditions. Strength increases damage done, Resilience helps the player withstand damage, Dexterity increases the chance to hit the opponent, Skill helps the player make better use of weapons and shields and Life is how many hit points the player has before being killed by an enemy. Better swords and shields improve the player's fighting and defensive abilities. When attacking an enemy, the player must choose and time well a hack or slash attack. When defending from enemy blows, the player must choose and time well a block or parry move to avoid taking damage. Killing an enemy raises both experience and statistics.

== Reception ==
Reception

Review scores
Publication	Score
Computer and Video Games	84% (DOS)
Dragon	4/5
CU Amiga	84% (Amiga)
Raze	85% (DOS); 83% (Amiga)
Zero	93% (PC)
Zzap!64	81% (C64)

Award
Publication	Award
Computer Gaming World	1991 Role-Playing Game of the Year

Elvira was well received by critics. Leah Wesolowski of Computer Gaming World in 1991 praised the game's graphics and music, stating that it was, "like its namesake, something to notice for many of us." Scorpia in 1991 and 1993 praised the graphics, stated that it was not easy, and concluded that "it's definitely worth playing". Elvira won the magazine's 1991 Role-Playing Game of the Year award.

Jim Trunzo reviewed Elvira in White Wolf #26 (April/May, 1991), rating it a 4 out of 5 and stated that "Digitized voices and sound effects help create a terrifyingly real environment in which to adventure, saves and restores are easy to access, and the manual is easy to read and understand. The game itself is quite difficult, however, and you might well need the hint book accessory in order to complete Elvira."

== See also ==
- Elvira: The Arcade Game
