= The Principle of Moments =

Studio album by Robert Plant
- Released: 15 July 1983
- Recorded: 1983
- Studios: Rockfield Studios (Monmouth, Wales)
- Genres: Power pop; synth-pop
- Length: 38:50
- Label: Atlantic
- Producers: Robert Plant; Benji Lefevre; Pat Moran

Robert Plant chronology
Pictures at Eleven (1982)	The Principle of Moments (1983)	Shaken 'n' Stirred (1985)

Singles from The Principle of Moments
- 1. "Big Log" Released: July 1983; 2. "In the Mood" Released: November 1983; 3. "Other Arms" Released: May 1984 (Japan)

Professional ratings
Review scores
Source	Rating
AllMusic	4/5 stars
Rolling Stone	4/5 stars

The Principle of Moments is the second solo studio album by the English singer Robert Plant, formerly of Led Zeppelin. It was Plant's second Top 10 album in the US and UK. It also gave him his first solo Top 40 hit with "Big Log". The most popular track on album-oriented rock radio in the US was "Other Arms", which reached number-one on the Billboard Top Tracks chart. Genesis' drummer Phil Collins played drums on five of the album's eight songs (as he did on Pictures at Eleven). On two tracks former Jethro Tull drummer Barriemore Barlow performed and on the closing track, "Big Log", Gerald Woodroffe programmed a Roland TR-808 drum machine.

Like Plant's debut solo studio album, Pictures at Eleven (1982), the songs departed from the hard rock sound of Led Zeppelin. Following the strength of these albums, Plant launched a successful tour in 1983. Collins was the drummer for Plant's band for the North American portion of the tour. Collins was content to perform in the background, despite his own enormous success as a solo artist and with Genesis at the time. Little Feat's Richie Hayward played drums for the remaining dates.

Rhino Entertainment released a remastered edition of the album, with bonus tracks, on 3 April 2007.

== Promotional music videos ==
The music video for "Big Log" was shot at the following locations: Crystal Road, Crystal, Nevada (gas station sequences), the Amargosa Opera House, Death Valley Junction, California (driving and "feather" sequence), Calico School House (Calico Ghost Town) Yermo, California (schoolhouse sequence), Glass Pool Inn, Las Vegas, Nevada (pool sequence). The bar sequence is believed to have been shot at a small bar in Shoshone, California (now the Crow Bar Cafe & Saloon), though this is unconfirmed.

A video for "In the Mood" was also produced.

== Tour ==
In 1983, Robert Plant went on a tour to promote the album, starting on 26 August in Peoria, Illinois, and ending on 1 October in Vancouver, British Columbia.

Tour dates
- 26 August 1983: Peoria, Illinois – Peoria Civic Center
- 27 August 1983: Kalamazoo, Michigan – Wings Stadium
- 29 August 1983: Rosemont, Illinois – Rosemont Horizon
- 30 August 1983: St. Louis, Missouri – Kiel Auditorium
- 31 August 1983: Milwaukee – MECCA Arena
- 3 September 1983: Detroit – Joe Louis Arena
- 4 September 1983: Cleveland, Ohio (Richfield) – Richfield Coliseum
- 6 September 1983: Worcester, Massachusetts – The Centrum
- 8 September 1983: Montreal – Montreal Forum
- 9 September 1983: Buffalo, New York – Buffalo Memorial Auditorium
- 10 September 1983: Toronto – Maple Leaf Gardens
- 12 September 1983: New York City – Madison Square Garden
- 13 September 1983: Hartford, Connecticut – Hartford Civic Center
- 14 September 1983: Philadelphia – The Spectrum
- 16 September 1983: Memphis, Tennessee – Mid-South Coliseum
- 18 September 1983: Biloxi, Mississippi – Mississippi Coast Coliseum
- 20 September 1983: Houston, Texas – The Summit
- 21 September 1983: Austin, Texas – Frank Erwin Center
- 22 September 1983: Dallas – Reunion Arena
- 24 September 1983: Denver, Colorado – McNichols Arena
- 27 September 1983: Los Angeles (Inglewood) – The Forum
- 28 September 1983: Oakland, California – Oakland–Alameda County Coliseum
- 30 September 1983: Seattle – Seattle Center Coliseum
- 1 October 1983: Vancouver, BC – Pacific Coliseum

== Track listing ==
Side one
No.	Title	Writer(s)	Length
1.	"Other Arms"	Robert Plant; Robbie Blunt	4:20
2.	"In the Mood"	Plant; Blunt; Paul Martinez	5:19
3.	"Messin' with the Mekon"	Plant; Blunt; Martinez	4:40
4.	"Wreckless Love"	Plant; Blunt	5:18

Side two
No.	Title	Writer(s)	Length
5.	"Thru' with the Two Step"	Plant; Blunt; Martinez	5:33
6.	"Horizontal Departure"	Plant; Blunt; Martinez; Jezz Woodroffe	4:19
7.	"Stranger Here... Than Over There"	Plant; Blunt; Martinez; Woodroffe	4:18
8.	"Big Log"	Plant; Blunt; Woodroffe	5:03
Total length:			38:50

2007 remaster bonus tracks
No.	Title	Writer(s)	Length
9.	"In the Mood" (Live)	Plant; Blunt; Martinez	7:35
10.	"Thru' with the Two Step" (Live)	Plant; Blunt; Martinez	11:11
11.	"Lively Up Yourself" (Live)	Bob Marley	3:04
12.	"Turnaround"	Plant; Blunt; Martinez; Woodroffe	4:55

- Live tracks: recorded at The Summit in Houston, Texas on 20 September 1983.

== Personnel ==
- Robert Plant – vocals
- Jezz Woodroffe – keyboards, synthesizers, Roland TR-808 (8)
- Robbie Blunt – guitars
- Bob Mayo – guitars (9–11)
- Paul Martinez – bass guitar
- Phil Collins – drums (1–3, 5–6, 8, all bonus tracks)
- Barriemore Barlow – drums (4, 7)
- John David – backing vocals
- Ray Martinez – backing vocals

=== Production ===
- Robert Plant – producer, mixing
- Benji Lefevre – producer, mixing
- Pat Moran – producer, mixing, engineer
- Storm Thorgerson – sleeve design
- APP – sleeve design

Remastering credits

- Dan Hersch – remastering (1–8)
- Bill Inglot – remastering (1–8)
- Raj Das – remastering and renovating (9–12)
- Nicola Powell – supervision
- Bill Curbishley – management
- Ed Vulliamy – liner notes
- DigiPrep (Hollywood, California, USA) and RAK Studios (London, UK) – remastering locations

== Chart performance ==
=== Weekly charts ===
Weekly chart performance for The Principle of Moments
Chart	Peak position
Australian Albums (Kent Music Report)	10
New Zealand Albums Chart	1
Swedish Albums Chart	41
UK Albums (Official Charts)	7
US Billboard 200	8

=== Year-end charts ===
1983 year-end chart performance for The Principle of Moments
Chart (1983)	Position
Australian Albums Chart	41

1984 year-end chart performance for The Principle of Moments
Chart (1984)	Position
Australian Albums Chart	83

== Certifications ==
Certifications for The Principle of Moments
Region	Certification	Certified units/sales
Australia (ARIA)	Gold	35,000^{^}
Canada (Music Canada)	Gold	50,000^{^}
New Zealand (RMNZ)	Platinum	15,000^{^}
United Kingdom (BPI)	Gold	100,000^{^}
United States (RIAA)	Platinum	1,000,000^{^}
^{^} Shipments figures based on certification alone.
