= The Fall: Last Days of Gaia =

2004 video game

- Developer(s): Silver Style Entertainment
- Publisher(s): Deep Silver
- Engine: Living World Architecture (LWA) engine
- Platform(s): Microsoft Windows
- Release: November 15, 2004
- Genre(s): Post-apocalyptic Tactical RPG
- Mode(s): Single-player

The Fall: Last Days Of Gaia is a role-playing video game that takes place in a post apocalyptic world. The game was developed by Silver Style Entertainment and published by Deep Silver in 2004. German gothic metal Band Darkseed wrote the song "The Fall" for the game, which was used on the trailer. The song was later featured on their 2005 album Ultimate Darkness.

== Development history ==
During the development, Silver Style Entertainment contracted the game designers Damien Folletto and Jeff Husges, ex-Black Isle Studios developers who worked before on Van Buren, the intended Fallout 3. In November 2004, the game was released in Germany and some other European countries but not in English-speaking countries. The release version was characterized by numerous game bugs, leading to a crash-prone game. Therefore, Silver Style released in April 2005 an Extended Version featuring bug fixes, reworked dialogs and improved sound quality. After finishing the Extended Version, Silver Style began work on an add-on, called The Fall - Mutant City, which takes place two years after the storyline of The Fall. Mutant City was finally released in 2011, but only in Germany.

On July 31, 2006, a Reloaded version was released, which includes all previous patches and adds additional quests and reworked textures. An announced English language version was never released, hence an unofficial patch from the fan community exists which translates all texts from the German version to English.
