= Robin Waterfield =

British classical scholar, writer of children's fiction (born 1952)

Robin Anthony Herschel Waterfield (born 6 August 1952) is a British classical scholar, translator, editor, and writer of children's fiction.

== Career ==
Waterfield was born in 1952, and studied Classics at Manchester University, where he achieved a first class degree in 1974. He went on to research ancient Greek philosophy at King's College, Cambridge until 1978, after which he became a lecturer at Newcastle University and then St Andrews University. He later became a copy-editor and later a commissioning editor for Penguin Books. He is now a self-employed writer.

== Works ==
=== Translations ===
- Plato: Philebus (translation, introduction, notes), Penguin Books (Penguin Classics), 1982
- Plato: Theaetetus (translation, introduction, notes), Penguin Books (Penguin Classics), 1987
- Plato: Hippias Major, Hippias Minor, Euthydemus (translations, introductions, notes) in Plato: Early Socratic Dialogues (ed. Trevor Saunders), Penguin Books (Penguin Classics), 1987
- Ps.-Iamblichus: The Theology of Arithmetic (translation, introduction, notes; foreword by Keith Critchlow), Phanes Press, 1988
- Xenophon: Conversations of Socrates (translations of Apology, Memorabilia, Symposium and Oeconomicus, with introductions and notes; partly a revision of earlier versions by Hugh Tredennick), Penguin Books (Penguin Classics), 1990
- Plutarch: Essays (translations; introductions and notes by Ian Kidd), Penguin Books (Penguin Classics), 1992
- Epicurus: Letter on Happiness (translation and biography; introduction by John McDade, S.J.), Rider Books, 1993 (US ed. Chronicle Books, 1996)
- Plato: Republic (translation, introduction, notes), Oxford University Press, 1993 (World's Classics, 1994; Book of the Month Club, February 1994)
- Plato: Symposium (translation, introduction, notes), Oxford University Press (World's Classics), 1994
- Plato: Gorgias (translation, introduction, notes), Oxford University Press (World's Classics), 1994
- Plato: Statesman (translation; introduction and notes by Julia Annas), Cambridge University Press (Cambridge Texts in the History of Political Thought), 1995
- Aristotle: Physics (translation; introduction and notes by David Bostock), Oxford University Press (World's Classics), 1996
- Xenophon: Hiero the Tyrant and Other Treatises (translations of Agesilaus, Hiero, Ways and Means, On Horsemanship, On Hunting and Hipparchicus; introductions and notes by Paul Cartledge), Penguin Books (Penguin Classics), 1997
- Herodotus: The Histories (translation; introduction and notes by Carolyn Dewald), Oxford University Press (Oxford World's Classics), 1998 (History Book Club, Book of the Month Club, Reader's Subscription, BCA)
- Plutarch: Greek Lives (translations; introductions and notes by Philip Stadter), Oxford University Press (Oxford World's Classics), 1998
- Plutarch: Roman Lives (translations; introductions and notes by Philip Stadter), Oxford University Press (Oxford World's Classics), 1999
- The First Philosophers: The Presocratics and the Sophists (translations, introductions, notes), Oxford University Press (Oxford World's Classics), 2000
- Euripides: Orestes and Other Plays (Ion, Orestes, Phoenician Women, Suppliant Women; translations; introduction by Edith Hall; notes by James Morwood), Oxford University Press (Oxford World's Classics), 2001
- Euripides: Heracles and Other Plays (Alcestis, Heracles, Heraclidae, Cyclops; translations; introduction by Edith Hall; notes by James Morwood), Oxford University Press (Oxford World's Classics), 2002
- Plato: Phaedrus (translation, introduction, notes), Oxford University Press (Oxford World's Classics), 2002
- Xenophon: The Expedition of Cyrus (translation; introduction and notes by Tim Rood), Oxford University Press (Oxford World's Classics), 2005
- Plato: Timaeus and Critias (translation; introduction and notes by Andrew Gregory), Oxford University Press (Oxford World's Classics), 2008
- Polybius: The Histories (translation; introduction and notes by Brian McGing), Oxford University Press (Oxford World's Classics), 2010
- Demosthenes: Selected Speeches (translation; introduction and notes by Chris Carey), Oxford University Press (Oxford World's Classics), 2014
- Plutarch: Hellenistic Lives (translation; introduction and notes by Andrew Erskine), Oxford University Press (Oxford World's Classics), 2016
- Aristotle: The Art of Rhetoric (translation; introduction and notes by Harvey Yunis), Oxford University Press (Oxford World's Classics), 2018
- Diodorus of Sicily: The Library, Books 16-20. Philip II, Alexander the Great, and the Successors (translation, introduction, notes), Oxford University Press (Oxford World's Classics, 2019
- Marcus Aurelius, Meditations: The Annotated Edition (translated and annotated), Basic Books (2021). ISBN 9781541673854
- The Complete Works of Epictetus: Handbook, Discourses, and Fragments (translated, edited, introduction and notes), University of Chicago Press (2022) ISBN 9780226769332
- Aesop's Fables (translation, introduction, notes), Basic Books (2024)
- The Wisdom of Marcus Aurelius (translation, introduction), Basic Books (2025)
- Thucydides, The History of the Peloponnesian War (translation; introduction by Polly Low), Basic Books (2025)
- Aristotle, Nicomachean Ethics (translation; introduction by John Sellars), Basic Books (2026)

=== General non-fiction ===
- Before Eureka: The Presocratics and Their Science, The Bristol Press, 1989 (US ed., St Martin's Press, 1989)
- Prophet: The Life and Times of Kahlil Gibran, Allen Lane, 1998 (Penguin, 1999; US ed., St Martin's Press, 1998; TSP Book Club; Italian ed., Guanda, 2000; Spanish ed., Editorial Complutense, 2000; French ed., Editions Fides-Bellarmin, 2000)
- Plato: Gorgias, Analysis and Commentary, Project Archelogos [e-publication], 2001
- Hidden Depths: The Story of Hypnosis, Macmillan, 2002 (Spanish ed., Debate, 2002)
- Athens: From Ancient Ideal to Modern City, Macmillan, 2003
- Xenophon's Retreat: Greece, Persia, and the End of the Golden Age, Faber and Faber/Harvard University Press, 2006
- Why Socrates Died: Dispelling the Myths, Faber and Faber/Norton/McClelland & Stewart, 2009
- Dividing the Spoils: The War for Alexander the Great's Empire, Oxford, 2011
- The Greek Myths, with Kathryn Waterfield, Quercus 2012
- Taken at the Flood: The Roman Conquest of Greece, Oxford, 2014
- Creators, Conquerors, and Citizens: A History of Ancient Greece, Oxford 2018
- The Making of a King: Antigonus Gonatas of Macedon and the Greeks, Oxford/Chicago 2021
- Plato of Athens: A Life in Philosophy, Oxford 2023

=== Children's adventure gamebooks ===
- Rebel Planet, Puffin Books (Puffin Fighting Fantasy Gamebook 18), 1985 (French ed., Gallimard 1986; US ed., Dell 1986; computer game, Adventure Soft 1986; Japanese ed., Shakai Shiso Sha 1987; Danish ed., Borgen 1987; Portuguese ed., Verbo 1991; Brazilian Portuguese ed., Marques-Saraiva, 1992; Czech ed., Perseus 1997)
- Masks of Mayhem, Puffin Books (Puffin Fighting Fantasy Gamebook 23), 1986 (French ed., Gallimard 1987; Japanese ed., Shakai Shiso Sha 1988; Danish ed., Borgen 1988; German ed., Thienemann 1989; Hungarian ed., Taketa 1992; Portuguese ed., Verbo 1993; Hebrew ed., Opus 1993; Czech ed., Perseus, 1999)
- Phantoms of Fear, Puffin Books (Puffin Fighting Fantasy Gamebook 28), 1987 (French ed., Gallimard 1988; Danish ed., Borgen 1989; Japanese ed., Shakai Shiso Sha 1989)
- The Money Spider (with Wilfred Davies), Penguin Books (Penguin Plus), 1988 (Polish ed., eMPi2 1996)
- The Water Spider (with Wilfred Davies), Penguin Books (Penguin Plus), 1988 (Polish ed., eMPi2 1998)
- Deathmoor, Puffin Books (Puffin Fighting Fantasy Gamebook 55), 1994 (French ed., Gallimard 1996)

=== Miscellaneous ===
- The Count of Monte Cristo (abridged by Robin Waterfield), Penguin Classics, 1996
