= Gorasul: The Legacy of the Dragon =

2001 video game

- Developer: Silver Style
- Publisher: JoWooD Productions
- Platform: Microsoft Windows
- Release: November 26, 2001
- Genre: Role-playing video game

Gorasul: The Legacy of the Dragon (German: Gorasul: Das Vermächtnis des Drachen) is a 2001 role-playing video game developed by the German studio Silver Style and published by JoWooD Productions.

== Gameplay ==
Gorasul: The Legacy of the Dragon is a role-playing video game that takes place from an isometric graphical perspective.

== Plot ==
Gorasul takes place in a fantasy setting and follows the story of Roszondas, an orphan raised by dragons. After being killed by demons, Roszondas awakens ten years in the future while suffering from amnesia.

== Development ==
Gorasul was developed by the German company Silver Style, and was the studio's first game to appear in North America. It launched in fall 2001 in Germany and November 2001 in the United States.

== Reception ==
Reception

Review scores
Publication	Score
Computer Games Magazine	3/5
GameSpot	6.4/10
PC Gamer (US)	54%

According to the review aggregator Metacritic, Gorasul received "mixed or average reviews" from critics. In Computer Games Magazine, John Brandon found Gorasul "worth a look" despite its flaws. GameSpot's Brett Todd wrote that the game "achieved something significant in copying the Baldur's Gate formula so well", but that its glitches and poor English translation made it a game "only for those who aren't easily frustrated or who have the patience to wait for a patch."
