= Ultimate Darkness =

Studio album by Darkseed
- Released: 2005
- Genre: Gothic metal
- Length: 49:03
- Label: Massacre Records
- Producer: Darkseed

Darkseed chronology
Astral Adventures (2003)	Ultimate Darkness (2005)	Poison Awaits (2010)

Ultimate Darkness is the seventh studio album by a German gothic metal band Darkseed. It was released in 2005, with Massacre Records.

== Track listing ==
All tracks by Stefan Hertrich

1. Disbeliever - 03:59
2. My Burden - 04:01
3. Ultimate Darkness - 03:49
4. Biting Cold - 04:19
5. The Dark One - 03:44
6. Save Me - 03:46
7. Speak Silence - 04:11
8. Next to Nothing - 03:33
9. Follow Me - 05:12
10. The Fall - 03:49
11. Endless Night - 04:08
12. Sleep Sleep Sweetheart - 04:32

== Unheralded Past (Bonus-CD) ==
1. Lifetime Alone - 03:59
2. Walk in Me - 4:28
3. Kingdom - 3:39
4. I Turn to You - 4:27 (Melanie C cover)
5. Watchful Spirit's Care - 5:04
6. Like to a Silver Bow - 5:38
7. The Bolt of Cupid Fell - 4:09
8. Give Me Light - 5:43
9. Spiral of Mistery - 3:57
10. Hold Me - 4:51
11. Not Alone - 3:29
12. Wisdom and Magic - 5:04
13. Paint It Black - 3:06 (The Rolling Stones cover)

== Personnel ==
- Stefan Hertrich - Vocals, Electronics
- Thomas Herrmann - Guitars
- Tom Gilcher - Guitars
- Martin Motnik – Bass
- Armin Dorfler - Keyboards
- Maurizio Guolo - Drums

== Use in other media ==
The song "The Fall" was written for the video game The Fall: Last Days of Gaia and a version was subsequently used in the trailer for the game.
