= Soldiers of Anarchy =

2002 video game

- Developer: Silver Style Entertainment
- Publishers: Bigben Interactive; Simon & Schuster Interactive
- Platform: Microsoft Windows
- Release: NA: October 23, 2002; EU: March 28, 2003
- Genre: Real-time tactics
- Mode: Single-player

Soldiers of Anarchy (SOA) is a 2002 squad-based real-time tactics video game released by Simon & Schuster.

== Gameplay ==
Gameplay involves squad tactics, vehicles, and a wide variety of weapons and ammo.

== Plot ==
The game takes place in the year 2015, ten years after a deadly man-made virus (Spontaneous Genome Degeneration Syndrome) kills billions across the planet. The initial protagonists are four soldiers who have spent the last decade in a bunker at a Russian Kalinina military base. What greets the survivors initially is a barren world populated by sporadic groups of survivors. Every community is self-sustaining, with trade organized by the Seeker Guild. Seekers are people who scavenge pre-catastrophe (referred to as Old Time) equipment from ruined cities. It is also revealed that after the disaster, central society became non-existent, with territories being controlled by gangs; apparently the area where the group's base was located was the territory of the Slingers, a group of thugs who have started to capture and kidnap people lately.

The group took control of a nearby town and its radar station. They also interrupted another kidnapping and busted up the Slinger base nearby, securing vital intelligence. The kidnapped were due to be sold at a slave market in New Boston, which the group wiped out and freed the slaves. They also paid a small visit to the Slinger headquarters nearby, killing their leader and permanently crippling their operations, as well as narrowly avoiding being caught in the crossfire of a gang war between the Claws and The Final Revolution.

The protagonists acquired intel about a secretive group of highly trained and heavily armed soldiers and scientists, known as NOAH. Their operations and location were a complete secret with only the local Seekers knowing the location of their laboratories. To gain this information in exchange, the protagonists intervened in the gang war in Bergstadt, joining one gang and wiping out the other (the choice is up to the player). However, the defeated gang retreated first to the township Solensk, then besieged the nearby NOAH base, leaving the protagonists to break the siege.

The leader of the local NOAH forces, Prof. Vlamidir Czeko gave the group minimal info: they were extensively but not successfully researching SGDS in the hope of finding a cure. They were suspicious about a religious community known as COTUC (Church Of The Undying Child). Suspiciously, nearly all of COTUC survived the SGDS-catastrophe and seem to be benefited from it, as they used the past ten years to research advanced technology.

To get more information, especially the location of the COTUC headquarters protagonists infiltrated a COTUC monastery protected by heavily armed troops, cyborgs and crawling mines: mines capable of subterranean movement and attracted to vibrations caused by surface movement. Fortunately the visit of a high ranked COTUC member can be used to extract the desired information. At this point, the storyline splits into two paths: the player can choose to join COTUC or to defeat them.

Joining COTUC the protagonists accepted a mission to infiltrate a NOAH compound and got vital intelligence from a COTUC spy. The intelligence revealed NOAH as responsible for creating SGDS and distributing it through the world in order to develop and sell the vaccine at a high price. Obviously, the vaccine wasn't completed and billions died as a result. Finally, the joint protagonist-COTUC taskforce raided and destroyed the central NOAH headquarters. At the end, the leader of COTUC arrived and gave the group a Hobson's choice: either surrender and be transformed into Death Knight cyborgs, or go down fighting.

Opposing COTUC the protagonists had to infiltrate the COTUC headquarters, disguised as unarmed monks. The group had to use anything they can find to fight their way out. It was also discovered that the COTUC not only found and synthesised a cure, but also perfected SGDS to become an even more potent toxin. Unfortunately the leader of COTUC escaped to his last resort and took the antidot with him. With a little help from a squad of NOAH soldiers the numerous enemies were defeated and a counterstrike targeting the players base was prevented. In his final standoff the COTUC leader offered an alliance, which was promptly and violently rejected.

Depending on the players choice the game has three possible endings, which are narrated in the closing:

- If the player joined COTUC and surrendered, the protagonists are transformed into hideous Death Knights. Their only hope is to eventually be able to break through the brainwashing and get revenge.
- If the player joined COTUC and fights, everyone is slaughtered. Maybe someone else will rise up and win against the COTUC in the future.
- If the player sided with NOAH and killed the COTUC leader, it is remarked as the first step of humanity towards restoring civilization.

== Reception ==
Reception

Aggregate score
Aggregator	Score
Metacritic	73/100

Review scores
Publication	Score
Computer Gaming World	2.5/5
GameSpot	8.1/10
IGN	8/10
PC Gamer (US)	75%
PC Zone	74%
X-Play	4/5

The game received "average" reviews according to the review aggregation website Metacritic.
