= Wilson Rogelio Enciso =

- Born: Wilson Rogelio Enciso; 1958; Chaguaní, Colombia
- Occupation: Writer, university professor, public servant
- Language: Spanish

Wilson Rogelio Enciso (Chaguaní, 1958) is a Colombian writer known for his literary work, which includes more than sixteen novels, two compilations of romantic stories, and over sixty short stories. Throughout his career, Enciso has explored various literary genres, particularly excelling in historical fiction, contemporary narrative, and romantic tales.

== Notable works ==
- The Illuminated Death of Marco Aurelio Mancipe (2016), Finalist in the IV International Novel Prize Contacto Latino 2016 and second place in the International Latino Book Awards 2019 in the category of Best Historical Novel in Spanish.
- With Uncertain Course (2017), a novel that explores how poverty impacts a person's life from childhood to death.
- Sick Souls (2018), a story about Rodrigo, who, upon falling in love, gets involved in a dark mystery in a nursing home with unforeseen consequences.
- The Cold of Oblivion (2019), a reflection on the history of a subcontinental society condemned to repeat its mistakes.
- I Loved in Silence, and in Silence I Die (2017), a compilation of romantic narratives that delve into unrequited love and its emotional depths.
