= Seas of Blood (video game) =

1985 video game

- Publisher: Adventure Soft
- Platforms: Amstrad CPC, Commodore 64, ZX Spectrum
- Release: WW: 1985
- Genre: Role-playing
- Modes: Single-player, multiplayer

Seas of Blood is a role-playing video game published by Adventure Soft in 1985 for the Amstrad CPC, Commodore 64, and ZX Spectrum.

== Gameplay ==
Seas of Blood is an adaptation of the Fighting Fantasy gamebook, Seas of Blood.

== Reception ==
Zzap!64 reviewed the game, rating it 75% overall, and stated that "the Fighting Fantasy team seem to have done for the company very much what Scott Adams did with the Marvel Superheroes - inject a new burst of energy that has resulted in an above average game."
