= Kayleth =

1986 video game

- Developer: Adventure Soft
- Publishers: Adventure Soft, U.S. Gold
- Platforms: Commodore 64, ZX Spectrum
- Release: 1986
- Genre: Adventure

Kayleth is a first person adventure video game for the Commodore 64 and the ZX Spectrum that was developed and published by Adventure Soft. The game has cyberpunk, sci fi and photo adventure elements.

== Gameplay ==
Players must use clues to change their playing methods during the game which involves figuring out an escape from their space cruiser (Kormar) in search for Kayleth.
