= Stefan Hertrich =

German musician and author

- Birth name: Stefan Andreas Hertrich
- Born: 9 May 1976 (age 48) Türkenfeld, Germany
- Genres: Gothic metal, industrial metal
- Occupation(s): Musician, singer, songwriter, author
- Instrument(s): Vocals, electronics
- Years active: 1990–present

Stefan Andreas Hertrich is a German vocalist for the band Shiva in Exile and formerly of Darkseed, Betray My Secrets and SpiRitual. The band is quoted as a "new age/oriental/gothic project" and was formed by Hertrich in 2003. The same year, Ethnic, Shiva in Exile's debut album, was released by Canadian label Trostlos Records. In 2004, the album won the Just Plain Folks Music Award in the category "Best New Age/World Album 2004". Since 2011, Hertrich is mainly occupied with writing spiritual audio books.

== Darkseed ==
Hertrich first started his music career as the lead vocalist of the band Darkseed. Darkseed is a German gothic metal band formed in 1992. Darkseed, beginning as a death metal band, took a more unconventional song writing method that aimed more towards the gothic experimental route. Hertrich left Darkseed in 2006 to pursue his own projects.

== Shiva in Exile ==
Hertrich has stated that the band's name conveys a spiritual view about the world. He has stated that its meaning intends the world lacks a spiritual point-of-view or morale and that "Shiva" or "Spirituality" is in Exile. However; he has also stated that the name "is a bit too negative" and has noticed more people integrating spiritual aspects into their life.

He is available on magnatune.com.

== Discography ==
- Darkseed – Romantic Tales (1994)
- Darkseed – Midnight Solemnly Dance (1996)
- Darkseed – Spellcraft (1997)
- Darkseed – Romantic Tales (Re-issued 1998 with tracks of the Demo Darksome Thoughts)
- Darkseed – Give Me Light (1999)
- Betray My Secrets – Betray My Secrets (1999)
- Sculpture – Sculpture (1999)
- Darkseed – Diving Into Darkness (2000)
- Shiva in Exile – Ethnic (2003)
- Darkseed – Astral Adventures (2003)
- Darkseed – Ultimate Darkness (2005)
- SpiRitual – Pulse (2005)
- Shiva in Exile – Nour (2008)
- Wenn der Wald spricht... - Weisheiten aus der Sicht der Natur (audio book, 2011)
- Wenn der Wald spricht... - Weisheiten aus der Sicht der Natur 2 (audio book, 2013)
- Kraftortreise – Der Soundtrack zur Waldhörbuchreihe (2013)
- Impulse aus der Geistigen Welt 1 (audio book, 2014)
