= Give Me Light =

Give me Light

Studio album by Darkseed
- Released: 1999
- Genre: Gothic metal
- Length: 43:13
- Label: Nuclear Blast
- Producer: Darkseed

Darkseed chronology
Romantic Tales (1998)	Give me Light (1999)	Diving Into Darkness (2000)

Professional ratings
Review scores
Source	Rating
Encyclopaedia Metallum	(83%)

Give Me Light is the fourth studio album by the German gothic metal band Darkseed. It was released in 1999, with Nuclear Blast.

== Track listing ==
1. "Dancing with the Lion" – 03:12
2. "Cold" – 03:58
3. "Echoes of Tomorrow" – 03:06
4. "Cosmic Shining" – 04:49
5. "Journey to the Spirit World" – 03:04
6. "Give Me Light" – 05:40
7. "Fusion" – 02:42
8. "Flying Together" – 03:24
9. "Echoes of Tomorrow (Acoustic Version)" – 03:04
10. "Spiral of Mystery" – 04:00
11. "Desire" – 01:39

== Lineup ==
- Stefan Hertrich – Vocals, programming
- Thomas Herrmann – Guitars
- Tom Gilcher – Guitars
- Rico Galvagno – Bass
- Willi Wurm – Drums

Guest Musicians:

- Doris Zweimüller – Female Vocals
- Gabriel Isuku – Percussion – Gabriel Isuku
