= Rebel Planet (video game) =

1985 video game

- Publisher: Adventure Soft
- Platforms: Acorn Electron, Amstrad CPC, BBC Micro, Commodore 64, ZX Spectrum
- Release: WW: 1985
- Genre: Role-playing
- Mode: Single player

Rebel Planet is a role-playing video game published by Adventure Soft in 1985 for the Acorn Electron, Amstrad CPC, BBC Micro, Commodore 64, and ZX Spectrum.

== Gameplay ==
Rebel Planet is an adaptation of the Fighting Fantasy gamebook, Rebel Planet.

== Reception ==
Zzap!64 reviewed the game, rating it 52% overall, and stated that "Rebel Planet is a fairly standard effort ... The graphics are pleasantly drawn as well so those who don't have the necessary imagination to view their surroundings in adventure games should not be disappointed. Those who are more interested in the flexibility of the plot and interactive capability of the game may be."
