= Broken Glass (band) =

- Origin: London, England
- Genres: Rock Punk New Wave
- Years active: 1975
- Label: EMI
- Past members: Stan Webb; Robbie Blunt; Rob Rawlinson; Mac Poole; Miller Anderson Paul Hooper, vocals. Sid Morris, Bass. Andrew Covell, Lead Guitar. Dean Thompson, Drums. Paul Fahy, Manager.

Broken Glass was a British rock band active in 1975. It was formed by guitarist Stan Webb. The band released one album.

== History ==
Stan Webb was in the blues band Chicken Shack, but decided to form Broken Glass after playing with blues band Savoy Brown. The new band formed with Robbie Blunt on guitar, Rob Rawlinson on bass, Mac Poole on drums, and Miller Anderson on guitar. The EMI record label backed the band's debut album, simply titled Broken Glass (1975, Capitol Records), which was produced by Tony Ashton. Lack of promotion limited the album's sales, and the band split up. Webb later re-formed Chicken Shack.

Broken Glass reformed with a different line up between April 1980 and October 1982 and played live gigs in the Rowley Regis, West Midlands, area. Paul Hooper, vocals. Sid Morris, bass guitar. Andrew Covell, lead guitar and Dean Thompson, drums. All of the band members were former pupils of Britannia High School, Rowley Regis. Sid Morris later went on to be a DJ of West Midlands pirate radio station Powerhouse Radio 105FM, West Midlands.

Broken Glass was reissued on compact disc in 2005 on the Progressive Line label.

== Discography ==
- Broken Glass (1975), Capitol
- Teachers (1980), Reddingtons Record Label (Single 45 RPM)
- Wasted (1980), Reddingtons Record Label (Single 45 RPM)
- Armed Flashers (1980), Reddingtons Record Label (LP 33 1/3 RPM)
