= Goin' Downtown =

2008 point-and-click adventure game

- Developer: Silver Style Entertainment
- Publishers: The Games Company, Kalypso Media
- Platform: Windows
- Release: May 22, 2008
- Genre: Adventure game
- Mode: Single-player

Goin' Downtown is a point-and-click adventure game developed by Silver Style Entertainment and published by The Games Company and Kalypso Media in English. It was released on May 22, 2008, for Windows.

The game received mixed reviews, praising its setting and graphics, but criticizing its brevity, un-detailed story, and simplistic gameplay.

== Gameplay ==
The game is a traditional point-and-click adventure which lets one mouse button move the main character within the world and the other interact with items and people.

Most of the obstacles are inventory based puzzles, but at various times there are also dialogue puzzles and a "faux stealth section".

== Plot ==
The main character is Jake McCorly, a rising star in the New York City police force in the late 21st century. Depressed from the death of his wife, he goes out to investigate a case of disappearing prostitutes when he rescues one who later disappears under mysterious circumstances.

== Development ==
The game's publisher, The Games Company, went bankrupt before it could be localized into English. The game was bought by Kalypso Media, who localized it but did not dub the game into English.

== Reception ==
Adventure Gamers rated the game 3/5 stars, saying that its sci-fi setting was "convincing" and the graphics "lovely", but calling the plot development lacking and the puzzles simplistic and easy, and criticizing the lack of English voice acting.

GameStar rated the game 79/100, praising the setting and adult themes of the game, but calling the main character unsympathetic and certain aspects of the game illogical.

Igromania rated the game 7/10, calling the Russian localization poorly done.
