= Simon the Sorcerer II: The Lion, the Wizard and the Wardrobe =

1995 video game

- Cover art
- Developer: Adventure Soft
- Publisher: Adventure Soft
- Designer: Simon Woodroffe
- Series: Simon the Sorcerer
- Platforms: Amiga, Macintosh, Windows, MS-DOS
- Release: 1995
- Genre: Adventure
- Mode: Single-player

Simon the Sorcerer II: The Lion, the Wizard and the Wardrobe is an adventure game developed by Adventure Soft and released in 1995 for MS-DOS. It is the second installment in the Simon the Sorcerer series of games, and the sequel to 1993's Simon the Sorcerer. The game's story focuses on a young teen named Simon, who is transported into a parallel universe of magic and monsters that he visited before, via a magical wardrobe created by an evil sorcerer he defeated in the last game. Players engage in a quest to help him find more fuel for the wardrobe by searching a vast world, consisting of parodies on popular fantasy novels and fairy tales.

The game received positive feedback from critics, and later spawned a sequel, Simon the Sorcerer 3D, in 2002. The game was later re-released for Microsoft Windows, via GOG.com in 2008, and was ported onto iOS the following year, until being discontinued in 2015 due to lack of technical support. A 25th anniversary edition of the game was developed by MojoTouch in 2018, and made available for iOS, as well as on GOG.com, Google Play and Amazon Appstore, featuring several improvements to the original game.

== Gameplay ==
As a point-and-click adventure game, the player controls the protagonist of the story, Simon, by using the mouse; with the exception of handheld versions, in which the player controls the character through touchscreen controls. Gameplay involves players moving Simon around locations in the game, interacting with objects and other characters at each site. The player can make Simon perform actions via a verbal command system, represented by picture icons – for example, the verbal command "Look at" is represented by a magnifying glass. Objects that are picked up are placed into an inventory – using such items requires the right action and target for it. The game primarily involves talking to people for information, including hints to solving puzzles or acquiring items, and using the correct items to solve puzzles during the course of the game. A menu system is provided for loading, saving and quitting the game via a postcard contained in the inventory, with a map system provided during two major points in the story that allows for travel between key locations to visit.

== Synopsis ==
=== Setting ===
The game's story takes in a parallel universe to the real world, in which magic and monsters exist, though with some modern items and technologies being found within. Several elements in the game are parodies of those from popular fantasy novels and fairy tales, such as Discworld, The Chronicles of Narnia and Goldilocks and the Three Bears, and of real world culture, such as fast food chain McDonald's and the role-playing board game Dungeons & Dragons.

=== Plot ===
A few years after the defeat of the evil sorcerer Sordid by Simon, a young boy from another world, Sordid's spellbook finds its way into the hands of a young farmhand named Runt. Inspired to become a mighty sorcerer, Runt receives his wish when his father burns the spellbook, causing Sordid's spirit to emerge from the ashes. Seeing potential in him, Sordid agrees to make Runt his apprentice in exchange for his help in exacting revenge on Simon. A few months later, Runt helps rebuild Sordid's lair within the Valley of Doom, while Sordid places his spirit into a mechanical body until he can permanently return from the dead. To complete his plan for his resurrection, Sordid creates a magical wardrobe to capture Simon and bring them back to him.

In the real world, Simon, now a teenager, is shocked to find the wardrobe in his bedroom moments after it arrived. Curious, he steps inside while inspecting it, only for the wardrobe to transport him to the world he visited in the past. To Sordid's horror, the wardrobe brings his nemesis to the good wizard Calypso, who now runs a magical emporium in a royal kingdom with his granddaughter Alix. Simon, now adorned with a new wizard's robe, is surprised to be back, and wrongfully blames Calypso for his predicament. After being told what exactly happened, Simon discovers the wardrobe can only take him back if he locates a magical fuel, known as "mucusade", to refuel it. Learning some is being held in the royal treasury in the king's castle, Simon decides to gain entry to the castle as the new royal magician, sabotaging a contest to find a replacement for the last one that the king accidentally killed.

After securing the mucusade through some difficulty, Simon gets lost within the streets on his way back to Calypso's, and is abducted by pirates. Managing to become the new cabin boy for their captain, Simon works to recover the mucusade from the ship's hold and return to the city. Despite being shipwrecked and needing the help of a genie, he soon returns to Calypso's only to discover Sordid had returned and had Alix kidnapped by his servants while they were searching for him. Discovering Calypso sabotaged the wardrobe to prevent him returning home, Simon reluctantly agrees to rescue Alix from the Valley of Doom. In a freak accident, Simon winds up in the dungeon with Alix, but manages to escape. In the process, Simon finds himself forced into a temporal loop by his future self, and then made to deal with events before his arrival to Sordid's lair.

After completing the loop, Simon finds himself captured by Runt, who forces him to go to Hell and recover Sordid's spirit. When Simon accomplishes this, he discovers to his horror that Sordid took over his body, and that his own spirit enter Sordid's mechanical one. Gagged by Runt, Simon watches helplessly as Calypso sends Sordid back to Simon's world unknowingly. As Sordid takes advantage of Simon's world for knowledge and power, Calypso soon realizes his mistake when, while pelting Sordid's body, he ungags it and hears Simon angrily berating him for his mistake. The game ends on a cliffhanger by this point, setting up the events for Simon the Sorcerer 3D.

== Development ==
It was advertised for a 1994 release in PC-Zone issue 20 of November 1994, but wasn't completed until 1995. Drafts for the plot had been in the works since August 1993, shortly before the first game was released. Simon Woodroffe wrote the entire story, going over the details for quite some time. The screens were sketched, lined and then colored in.

== Releases ==
The PC sequel was released in a large black box and, like the original, the copy-protected floppy disk version required the manual to be able to play the game. Unlike the disk version, the CD-ROM was not copy-protected, its colour manual fit in the front of the jewel case and also included the full "talkie" soundtrack. For this second installment in the series, Brian Bowles became the voice of Simon, making him sound much older, presumably in his late-teens.

The Amiga version was originally scheduled for release alongside the PC version in 1995, but was cancelled, possibly because of the decline of the Amiga market. The rights for the Amiga release were eventually secured by Epic Interactive Entertainment (now RuneSoft) in 1999, who released it on CD in July 2000 in a DVD-style case.

The game was released on GOG.com in 2008 and a port for iOS was released in 2009 and discontinued mid-2015, due to lack of iOS 8 and up support.

The 25th Anniversary Edition was developed by MojoTouch and released on Google Play and Amazon Appstore in 2013 (then called "20th Anniversary Edition") and on the App Store (iOS), Steam and GOG.com in 2018. This edition includes new hotspot-based controls, new high-definition menus with a save/load system and different settings, improved graphics upscaling (xBRZ filter), full voice acting with subtitles, multi-language support and some bonus material.

== Reception ==
Reception

Aggregate score
Aggregator	Score
GameRankings	80%

Review scores
Publication	Score
Datormagazin	5/5
Amiga Active	4/4
Adventure Classic Gaming	4/5 (PC)
Adventure Gamers	4/5

The game has sold over 600,000 copies worldwide.

In 2011, Adventure Gamers named Simon the Sorcerer II the 88th-best adventure game ever released.
