= Pictures at Eleven =

1982 studio album by Robet Plant

Studio album by Robert Plant
- Released: 28 June 1982
- Recorded: September 1981–1982
- Studio: Rockfield Studios (Monmouth, Wales)
- Genre: Hard rock; arena rock
- Length: 42:12
- Label: Swan Song
- Producer: Robert Plant

Robert Plant chronology
Pictures at Eleven (1982)	The Principle of Moments (1983)

Singles from Pictures at Eleven
- 1. "Burning Down One Side" Released: September 1982; 2. "Pledge Pin" Released: November 1982 (US)

Pictures at Eleven is the debut solo studio album by the former Led Zeppelin singer Robert Plant, released on 28 June 1982 in the US and on 2 July in the UK. Genesis drummer Phil Collins played drums for five of the album's eight songs. Ex-Rainbow drummer Cozy Powell handled drums on "Slow Dancer" and "Like I've Never Been Gone." On the song "Fat Lip", guitarist Robbie Blunt played a Roland TR-808 drum machine. The album's title was an often-heard phrase in US television news that would follow a brief announcement of a story of interest to be shown later during a station's 11 PM news program. Pictures at Eleven is the only one of Plant's solo albums to appear on Led Zeppelin's record label Swan Song. By the time of Plant's next release, 1983's The Principle of Moments, Swan Song had ceased to function, and Plant had started his own label named Es Paranza, which would also be distributed by Atlantic Records. Rhino Entertainment released a remastered edition of the album, with bonus tracks, on 20 March 2007.

== Critical reception ==
Professional ratings
Review scores
Source	Rating
Allmusic	link
Christgau's Record Guide	B
Rolling Stone	4/5 stars
Sounds	5/5 stars
The Village Voice	B+

In a contemporary review for Rolling Stone, Kurt Loder wrote, "even though there's nothing new going on in these grooves, the sheer formal thrill of hearing someone who knows exactly what he's doing makes Pictures at Eleven something of an event almost in spite of its modest ambitions." In The Boston Phoenix, Milo Miles said that "Pictures at Eleven is largely a gloss on Led Zeppelin, but this small contribution lightens the reputation of heavy metal’s ruthless warlords." Robert Christgau from The Village Voice was impressed by Plant's ability to recreate Led Zeppelin's aural sensibilities with duller musicians and catchier undertones, but ultimately found the music somewhat insignificant.

== Track listing ==
All tracks are written by Robert Plant and Robbie Blunt, except where stated.

Side one
No.	Title	Writer(s)	Length
1.	"Burning Down One Side"	Robert Plant, Robbie Blunt, and Jezz Woodroffe	3:55
2.	"Moonlight in Samosa"		3:58
3.	"Pledge Pin"		4:01
4.	"Slow Dancer"		7:43

Side two
No.	Title	Writer(s)	Length
5.	"Worse Than Detroit"		5:55
6.	"Fat Lip"	Plant, Blunt, and Woodroffe	5:05
7.	"Like I've Never Been Gone"		5:56
8.	"Mystery Title"		5:16
Total length:			42:12

2007 remaster bonus tracks
No.	Title	Writer(s)	Length
9.	"Far Post"	Plant, Blunt, and Woodroffe	4:42
10.	"Like I've Never Been Gone" (Live at Houston, 1983)		7:31

== Personnel ==
- Robert Plant – vocals, harmonica
- Robbie Blunt – guitars, Roland TR-808 on track 6
- Jezz Woodroffe – keyboards, synthesizers
- Phil Collins – drums on tracks 1–3, 5, 8, all bonus tracks
- Cozy Powell – drums on tracks 4 and 7
- Paul Martinez – bass guitar
- Raphael Ravenscroft – saxophone on track 3

== Charts ==
Chart performance for Pictures at Eleven
Chart (1982)	Peak position
Australian Albums (Kent Music Report)	6
German Albums (Offizielle Top 100)	49
New Zealand Albums (RMNZ)	16
Norwegian Albums (VG-lista)	17
Swedish Albums (Sverigetopplistan)	32
UK Albums (OCC)	2
US Billboard 200	5

== Certifications ==
Certifications for Pictures at Eleven
Region	Certification	Certified units/sales
Australia (ARIA)	Gold	35,000^{^}
Canada (Music Canada)	Platinum	100,000^{^}
United Kingdom (BPI)	Silver	60,000^{^}
United States (RIAA)	Platinum	1,000,000^{^}
^{^} Shipments figures based on certification alone.
