= Glass Pool Inn =

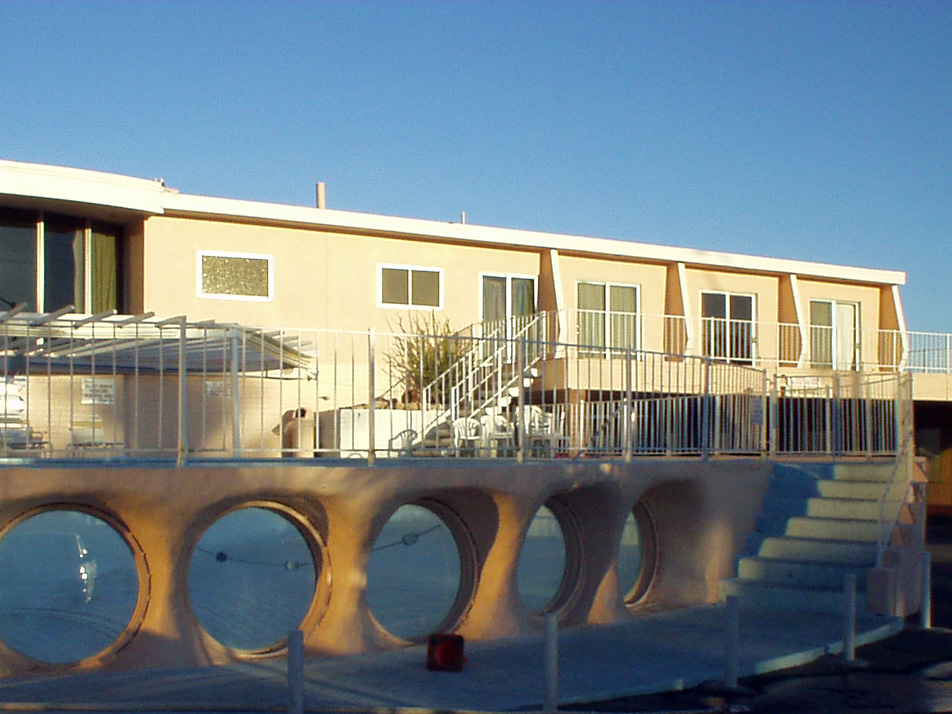
- The motel and pool in October 2003, shortly after closure.
- Former names: Mirage Motel (1952–1988)

General information
- Status: Demolished
- Type: Motel
- Location: Paradise, Nevada, 4613 South Las Vegas Boulevard, United States
- Coordinates: 36.08681°N 115.17271°W
- Opened: 1952
- Closed: September 2003
- Demolished: 2004

Technical details
- Floor count: 2
- Grounds: 1.5 acres (0.61 ha)

Other information
- Number of rooms: 48

Glass Pool Inn was a motel located on the Las Vegas Strip in Paradise, Nevada. It initially opened as the Mirage Motel in 1952. An above-ground swimming pool was added in 1955, and included large porthole windows that allowed outsiders to peer inside. The motel became well known for its pool, which was used in numerous films and television shows, as well as music videos and photo shoots.

In 1988, the Mirage Motel was renamed as the Glass Pool Inn to avoid confusion with Steve Wynn's new Mirage resort, also located on the Las Vegas Strip. The Glass Pool Inn was closed in September 2003, and demolished a year later for the proposed "World Port" project that was never built.

== History ==
=== Mirage Motel and renaming ===
The 22-room Mirage Motel was opened in 1952, on the southern end of the Las Vegas Strip, known at the time as Highway 91. In 1953, Robert and Betty Rosoff purchased the motel. To compete against hotels further north on the Las Vegas Strip, the Rosoffs believed that the motel needed something to attract tourists arriving from southern California. In 1955, the Rosoff couple and one of their siblings installed an above-ground swimming pool with seven porthole windows, each one measuring four feet wide and providing people the ability to see into the pool.

The kidney-shaped pool was nine feet above ground, measured 26 feet by 55 feet, and was designed by the sibling who helped install it. The pool contained either 54,000 or 56,000 gallons of water. Future motel owner Allen Rosoff, the son of Robert and Betty Rosoff, said that at the time, the concept of an above-ground pool with windows posed design challenges: "You had the electrolysis, you had steel windows. Brass fittings in there. Aluminum in a couple of other areas, besides your regular plaster and gunite." By 1961, Allen Rosoff was a co-owner of the motel with his parents. That year, a California resident filed a $45,000 lawsuit against the motel after his arms were paralyzed in a diving board incident a year earlier, in which he hit a swimmer while landing in the pool. The diving board and a slide were removed from the pool some time later.

Allen Rosoff and his wife Susie took over operations in 1971. In 1987, Allen Rosoff filed a trademark infringement lawsuit against the newly opened La Mirage hotel and casino, alleging that the resort was costing him customers who were confusing the two properties. Rosoff won a permanent injunction against La Mirage. However, La Mirage was granted a stay of proceedings until it could appeal the case to the Nevada Supreme Court. In 1988, as La Mirage was appealing the case, businessman Steve Wynn purchased the Mirage name from both businesses to avoid confusion with his upcoming Mirage resort, which opened on the Las Vegas Strip a year later. Both businesses received $250,000 to stop using the name as of July 1, 1988. At the time, the motel also had a lounge. In August 1998, the Rosoffs announced that they were considering selling the motel, which had 48 rooms at the time. By May 1999, Susie Rosoff had filed a formal complaint against police officers, alleging that they were repeatedly harassing customers and employees at the motel.

=== Sale and demolition ===
In August 1999, Allen and Susie Rosoff sold the motel and its 1.5-acre property for $5.5 million to developers Howard Bulloch and David Gaffin. Allen Rosoff said he had become tired of renovating and maintaining the aging property. In December 1999, a spokeswoman for the motel said that occupancy had increased to 70 percent, after a decrease in room rates.

In 2000, Bulloch, Gaffin and their partner Tom Gonzales transferred ownership of the property to their group, known as New World, with plans for a megaresort. New World purchased several other nearby motels to accumulate a 77-acre parcel located on the Las Vegas Strip and east of the Mandalay Bay. In January 2001, plans were announced for World Port Resorts, a megaresort consisting of hotel-casinos, a convention center and a fine arts facility. The project was to be built on the 77-acre property, a portion of which was occupied by the Glass Pool Inn.

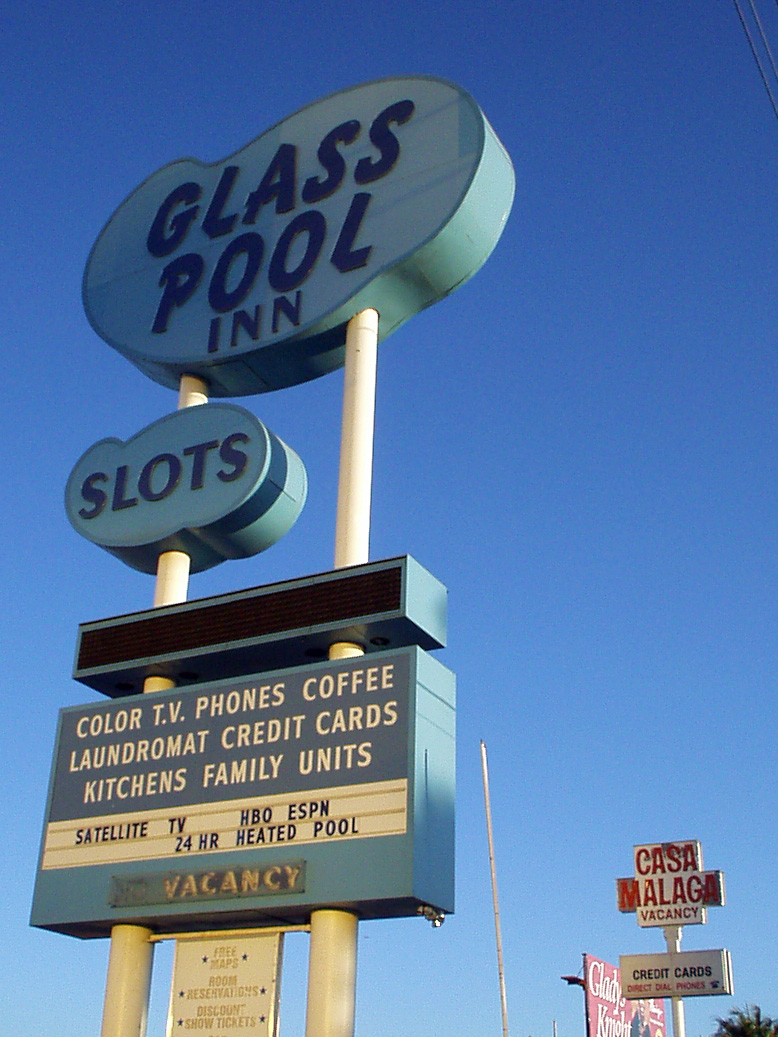
The Glass Pool Inn sign (October 2003)

A restaurant that used to operate on the property had been closed by 2002. The motel was closed in mid-September 2003, after Gonzales' TG Investments took control of 46 acres of the 77-acre parcel, including the Glass Pool Inn property. Gonzales planned to demolish the motel, but did not specify his plans for the property.

Allen Rosoff said he and his wife were pleased with the decision to demolish the motel: "The place was getting so deteriorated that I felt that with all the fond memories of almost 50 years involved in my family, I would rather remember what it was than see how rundown the motel was getting." Rosoff said it "would be nice" if another Glass Pool were constructed some day, "but as for this place, it was built 50 years ago to the code of those days. It is time."

It was reported that many Las Vegas residents were disappointed about the plans to demolish the pool, but that there was limited local interest in saving it. The administrator for the Clark County Museum said that moving the pool to preserve it would not be possible, but said that it would be further documented and photographed before its demolition. The motel was demolished in 2004. The Glass Pool Inn's sign was left intact after the motel was demolished. The sign was to be donated to the city's Neon Museum, but went missing in June 2012.

== In popular culture ==
The Mirage Motel's above-ground pool gained immediate attention from filmmakers after it was built. At the time of the Glass Pool Inn's closing, Trent Othiel, the owner of a local movie production company, said about the pool: "It screams Las Vegas, it's so eye-catching. You immediately look when you pass it. That's what you want on film." At that time, Allen Rosoff spoke about all the actors who filmed at the motel: "In the beginning, all this was really fascinating, but after a while, it became old hat. We'd meet them, see them, say hello. They were there to film. It's not like they came to socialize. But for a tiny hotel, we had quite a following around the world." Although fictional murders and drug deals were commonly filmed at the motel, Allen Rosoff was indifferent to such depictions, stating, "Publicity is publicity, good, bad, or otherwise." Rosoff also said that only one death, a suicide, had occurred at the motel in its entire history.

=== Films ===
The first film to shoot at the motel was Las Vegas Shakedown in 1955, starring actor Dennis O'Keefe. One of the motel rooms was used by Marilu Henner and Nicolas Surovy for a scene in the 1985 television film Stark. Scenes involving actors Martin Sheen and Emilio Estevez were filmed at the Mirage Motel in 1988, for the film Nightbreaker.

The Glass Pool Inn was later used for a scene in the 1993 film Indecent Proposal, in which characters portrayed by Woody Harrelson and Demi Moore check into the motel. Director Adrian Lyne had considered placing Rosoff and his wife at the front desk to check in the characters portrayed by Moore and Harrelson, although she ultimately concluded that they did not fit the role of desk clerks.

The motel was later featured in the opening shots of the 1995 film Casino. The pool was used in the 1995 film Leaving Las Vegas, in which actors Nicolas Cage and Elisabeth Shue kissed underwater for a scene. In January 2000, scenes were shot at the motel for Luckytown. In March 2001, scenes were shot at the motel for the Hong Kong film Second Time Around.

=== Television ===
The pool was once used by scuba divers who played poker underwater to encourage donations to The Jerry Lewis MDA Labor Day Telethon. The Las Vegas tourism board also filmed an advertisement involving bikini-clad women playing a slot machine while submerged in the pool. Television commercials for cosmetic products and hairpieces were filmed in the pool to demonstrate to consumers that the product would not come off in water.

The motel was featured on an episode of the television series Vega$, in which teenage hookers were depicted to be living there. The motel was subsequently featured on the television series Crime Story. The Glass Pool Inn and Allen Rosoff appear in the opening montage of ABC's short-lived series The Man in the Family, which premiered in 1991. Cindy Crawford also filmed an episode of her MTV television series, House of Style, in a motel suite that was once used by Allen Rosoff's parents as an apartment. The motel appeared in a February 2001 episode of CSI: Crime Scene Investigation, titled "To Halve and To Hold."

=== Music ===
The music video for Robert Plant's 1983 song, "Big Log", was shot at the pool. The band and crew ultimately chose to stay at the motel for the night, changing their initial plans to stay at the Las Vegas Hilton. A music video for one of Bon Jovi's songs was also shot at the motel. ZZ Top's music video for their 1992 version of "Viva Las Vegas" was shot at the Glass Pool Inn. For the video, the band performed inside the pool after it had been emptied; water was then digitally added back into the pool. A music video was shot at the motel in April 1997. Atmospheric shots of the motel were used for a Bee Gees concert held in Las Vegas later that year. In February 2000, Rollergirl shot her music video for "Eternal Flame" at the motel.

=== Photo shoots ===
In the 1990s, a local photographer organized weekly photo contests at the pool which allowed aspiring models to receive portfolio pictures of themselves for free. Photographer Annie Leibovitz also shot pictures of actor Brad Pitt at the motel for an edition of Vanity Fair. In December 1999, models from the Italian edition of Elle posed at the motel for a photo shoot. In March 2000, the motel's pool was the site of a photo shoot for the American Girl magazine; photographer Thomas Heinser, who had been to Las Vegas before, said, "I remembered that pool -- I drove by it once -- and it stuck in the back of my head."
