= Headfirst Productions =

UK video game developer

- Company type: Private
- Industry: Video games
- Founded: 1998
- Founder: Mike Woodroffe; Simon Woodroffe
- Defunct: 2006
- Headquarters: Canwell, Sutton Coldfield, West Midlands, UK
- Website: headfirst.co.uk

Headfirst Productions was a British video game studio established by father and son Mike and Simon Woodroffe (Adventure Soft) in 1998. The studio was an independent developer of games for both the console and PC market.

== Games ==
- Battle of the Planets (cancelled)
- Call of Cthulhu: Beyond the Mountains of Madness (cancelled)
- Call of Cthulhu: Dark Corners of the Earth (2005)
- Call of Cthulhu: Destiny's End (vaporware, cancelled)
- Call of Cthulhu: Tainted Legacy (cancelled)
- Deadlands (cancelled)
- Simon the Sorcerer 3D (2002)

== Bankruptcy ==
After having published Call of Cthulhu: Dark Corners of the Earth, Headfirst had problems with publisher Bethesda Softworks regarding finances. Some time after that, about half of the company left, so the second project's team (Call of Cthulhu: Destiny's End), along with some people from the Call of Cthulhu: Dark Corners of the Earth production team, stayed on board trying to keep working on the project, porting it to the next-gen consoles, while the directors were trying to secure a publishing deal for the game. After several months of struggle the company went into administration.

Most of the staff went on to other West Midlands game companies, namely Codemasters, Eurocom and Sega Racing Studio. In February 2006, Headfirst Productions went into administration in an effort to pay off outstanding debts owed because of production costs associated with the many years of Cthulhu development, and other unsigned projects. Assets were liquidated, employees were laid off, and the company was dissolved less than a month later.

== See also ==
- Adventure Soft
