= Silver Style Entertainment =

German video game developer

- Company type: Private
- Industry: Video games
- Founded: 1993
- Defunct: June 26, 2014
- Headquarters: Berlin, Germany
- Parent: The Games Company (2006 - 2010)

Silver Style Entertainment (later known as Silver Style Studios) was a video game developer based in Berlin, Germany, founded in 1993 by Carsten Strehse. In 2006, the company was taken over by The Games Company, and became an in-house development studio. Originally, the company developed largely for the PC, but following the acquisition it has shifted its focus to include consoles such as the Xbox 360.

After its mother company The Games Company became insolvent, the company continued to exist under the new name Silver Style Studios, without its original founder, Carsten Strehse. Four years later, the newly named company became insolvent as well.

== Games ==
- Goin' Downtown
- Gorasul: The Legacy of the Dragon
- Simon the Sorcerer 4: Chaos Happens
- Simon the Sorcerer: Who'd Even Want Contact?!
- Soldiers of Anarchy
- The Fall: Last Days of Gaia
- The Fall: Mutant City (2011)
- The Dark Eye: Demonicon (2012) (transferred to Kalypso Media and Noumena Studios)
- The Dark Eye: Herokon Online
