= Robbie Blunt =

English rock guitarist (born 1951)

Robert Blunt
- Born: Robert William Blunt; 4 March 1951 (age 75); Worcestershire, England
- Genres: Rock
- Occupation: Musician
- Instrument: Guitar
- Years active: 1969–present
- Formerly of: Bronco; Silverhead; Broken Glass; Stan Webb's Chicken Shack

Robert William Blunt (born 4 March 1951) is a rock guitarist who has worked with a variety of bands, most notably serving in Robert Plant's solo band in the 1980s.

== Career ==
Robbie Blunt initially gained attention as a journeyman guitarist, working for brief periods of time for several English rock groups starting in the early 1970s. His first notable work was as a member of the country rock band Bronco, with which he appeared on two albums. Later in the decade he served brief stints with Silverhead, Broken Glass, and Chicken Shack, giving him experience in varied genres from glam to blues. Blunt was a longtime friend of Robert Plant, who initially invited him to co-write the song "Pledge Pin" for Plant's first solo album Pictures at Eleven. Blunt then became the guitarist for Plant's first three albums. Blunt also participated in the Honeydrippers project in 1984. After leaving Plant's band, Blunt served as a session musician for Edie Brickell & New Bohemians, Julian Lennon, and Clannad.

== Select discography ==
=== Albums ===
- Bronco
  - 1970: Country Home
  - 1971: Ace of Sunlight
- Silverhead
  - 1973: 16 and Savaged
- Broken Glass
  - 1975: Broken Glass
- Stan Webb's Chicken Shack
  - 1977: The Creeper
  - 1978: That's the Way We Are
- Steve Gibbons Band
  - 1980: Street Parade
- Robert Plant
  - 1982: Pictures at Eleven
  - 1983: The Principle of Moments
  - 1985: Shaken 'n' Stirred
- Edie Brickell & New Bohemians
  - 1988: Shooting Rubberbands at the Stars
- Jeff Healey
  - 1988: See the Light
- John Kilzer
  - 1991: Busman's Holiday
