= Romantic Tales =

Studio album by Darkseed
- Released: 1998
- Genre: Gothic metal Death-doom
- Length: 49:26
- Label: Nuclear Blast
- Producer: Darkseed

Darkseed chronology
Spellcraft (1998)	Romantic Tales (1998)	Give me Light (2000)

Romantic Tales is the third studio album by the German gothic metal band Darkseed. It was released in 1998, with Nuclear Blast. Songs 1-4 are from the band's 1996 ep, "Romantic Tales", and songs 5-8 are from the demo, "Darksome Thoughts" originally released in 1993,

== Track listing ==
1. "Dream Recalled on Waking" - 03:15
2. "In Broken Images" - 07:29
3. "Above the Edge of Doom" - 05:24
4. "A Charm for Sound Sleeping" - 03:02
5. "Last Dream" - 05:45
6. "Frozen Tears" - 07:53
7. "Atoned for Cries" - 08:52
8. "Luctu Perditus" - 02:16
9. "Atoned for Cries (Rough Mix)" - 05:30

== Lineup ==
- Stefan Hertrich - Vocals, bass
- Andi Wecker - Guitars
- Jacek Dworok - Guitars
- Harald Winkelr - Drums

Guest Musicians:

- Veronika Marte - Female Vocals
- Marlene Willce - Violin
- Christian Bystron - Guitar Solos
