= Elvira II: The Jaws of Cerberus =

1992 video game

- Atari ST cover art
- Developer: Horror Soft
- Publisher: Accolade
- Producer: Mark Wallace
- Designers: Michael Woodroffe; Alan Bridgman; Simon Woodroffe
- Artists: Paul Drummond; Kevin Preston; Maria Drummond
- Composers: Jezz Woodroffe; Philip Nixon
- Engine: AberMUD (modified)
- Platforms: Amiga, Atari ST, Commodore 64, MS-DOS
- Release: 1992
- Genres: Adventure, role-playing
- Mode: Single-player

Elvira II: The Jaws of Cerberus is the second game in the Elvira series of horror adventure/role-playing video games. It was developed by Horror Soft and published by Accolade in 1992. The game is a sequel to 1990's Elvira: Mistress of the Dark.

== Plot ==
The main character is Elvira's boyfriend, whose mission is to save Elvira, captured by the demon Cerberus who wants to use her magical power for his own aims. The player seeks Elvira in a horror movie studio where the props and movie sets have turned into actual monstrosities, apparently as a result of building the studio on haunted grounds.

== Gameplay ==
In-game screenshot. The player meets the janitor in the studio basement - one of the few friendly characters in the game.

Gameplay in Elvira II takes place in first-person perspective. The player can move forward and backward, or turn right, left or back by clicking on one of the arrows in the bottom-left corner of the screen. Rather than being truly 3D, the game simulates the player's view by using a large amount of 2D images which depict the rooms and corridors from various spots and angles; due to this, the player's freedom is somewhat limited - in many rooms, it's impossible to look to the side, for example.

Out of the four areas in the game (the main studio building and the three movie sets), two of them (main building and Studio 2 - the haunted house) have more adventure elements, focusing mainly on collecting useful items and problem-solving, while the others (Studio 1 and 3 - set in insect-filled caverns and a dungeon, respectively) are similar to a classic dungeon crawl.

The magic system was unique at the time as the player could cast magic spells using the items found around the studio (which meant that the game was very much a loot and explore type game). The recipe for the spell indicated what sort of item would be required in order to cast it (a glass item, or an inflammable liquid for example) and the player would have to come up with an item matching that description. In the examples given the glass object could be anything from a glass bottle to a glass ashtray, whilst the inflammable liquid would be a spray or a bottle of alcohol.

== Reception ==
Reception

Review scores
Publication	Score
Dragon	5/5 (MS-DOS)
The One	77% (Amiga)

The game was reviewed in 1992 in Dragon #180 by Hartley, Patricia, and Kirk Lesser in "The Role of Computers" column. The reviewers gave the game 5 out of 5 stars. The reviewers felt the game was "truly engrossing, exciting, and jam-packed with horror! From the opening screens, you'll be on the edge of your seat trying to rescue the beloved Elvira. This is a must purchase!" Scorpia of Computer Gaming World in 1992 was unable to finish Elvira II because of unwinnable elements that occurred without warning, and a flawed save feature that would have forced her to replay most of the story. She concluded that the game was "a grave disappointment". In 1993 she called the game "surprisingly bad ... best avoided", "an incredibly tedious hack'n'slash" with "poorly designed adventure puzzles".

The One gave the Amiga version of Elvira II an overall score of 77%, calling the gory graphics "excellent" and the UI "reasonably intuitive to use". The One criticises exploration in Elvira II, expressing their annoyance in regard to sideways movement, stating "for example, if you want to go to the right, you have to spin though 90 degrees and move forward - two actions where one would have been more user-friendly." The One also criticises the number of disks and amount of disk swapping, noting that Elvira II spans seven disks, and calls it "a decent RPG, marred by excessive disk loading and swapping - there are occasions when the loading takes up more time than the action" and furthermore calls Elvira II "A large role playing game with small, but significant design faults". The One concludes their review by stating that Elvira II has "plenty of monsters, good combat and magic systems, and a large landscape to explore, there's plenty to keep you entertained."
