= Pledge Pin =

Single by Robert Plant

from the album Pictures at Eleven
- B-side: "Fat Lip"
- Released: November 1982
- Recorded: 1982
- Genre: Rock
- Length: 4:01
- Label: Swan Song
- Songwriters: Robert Plant; Robbie Blunt
- Producer: Robert Plant

Robert Plant singles chronology
"Burning Down One Side" (1982)	"Pledge Pin" (1982)	"Big Log" (1983)

"Pledge Pin" is a song by Robert Plant from his album Pictures at Eleven. It was a popular track on album-oriented rock radio in the United States, peaking at number 11 on the Billboard Top Tracks chart in 1982. Later released as the second single from the album, it reached number 74 on the Billboard Hot 100 and number 15 on Billboard Top Tracks.

== Track listing ==
=== US 7" single ===
A: "Pledge Pin" (Robert Plant, Robbie Blunt) – 4:01
B: "Fat Lip" (Plant, Blunt, Jezz Woodroffe) – 5:05
