= Waxworks (1992 video game) =

1992 video game

- Developer: Horror Soft
- Publisher: Accolade
- Designers: Michael Woodroffe; Alan Bridgman; Simon Woodroffe
- Artists: Maria Drummond; Paul Drummond; Kevin Preston; Jef Wall
- Writer: Richard Moran
- Composer: Jezz Woodroffe
- Platforms: Amiga, MS-DOS
- Release: November 1992
- Genre: Role-playing
- Mode: Single-player

Waxworks is a 1992 role-playing video game developed by Horror Soft and published by Accolade for Amiga and MS-DOS. The player traverses historically themed dungeons, solving puzzles and fighting enemies, to remove a curse from the player character's family. It was inspired by the 1988 film Waxwork.

== Gameplay ==
Alongside solving puzzles, the player must fight enemies. Pictured: A servant of the High Priest of Anubis.

Waxworks is a horror-themed first-person dungeon crawl role-playing video game. The game is divided into five time periods: Ancient Egypt, Medieval Transylvania, Victorian England, an industrial mine period and Ixona's period. Three of those time periods have a mixture of puzzle-solving and combat, while the Victorian England and Ixona ones are more puzzle-solving oriented. The levels may be completed in any order, except for Ixona's period, which must be done last. Once a time period is completed, the player is reset to level one and loses all items and weapons, which do not transfer to other levels. The player levels up in each time period by defeating enemies, solving puzzles and exploring areas, which increases maximum health and psychic power, the latter of which can be used to contact Uncle Boris. The player can use Uncle Boris' crystal ball to get hints and healing: the reagents needed for the healing spell depend on the level.

In each time period, the player moves through a series of tight corridors using a bitmap sprite-based point-and-click interface picking up items, solving puzzles, avoiding traps and engaging in combat with various opponents. During combat, players can target their opponent's individual body parts, such as the head or arms. The main objective is to collect a special item from each of the evil twin ancestors before venturing into the Ixona period to undo the family curse.

== Plot ==
Waxworks' graphic gore was noted as a defining trait of the game by critics.

Long ago, the witch Ixona stole a chicken from the player character's ancestor, who chopped off her hand as punishment. In retaliation, Ixona placed a curse on the ancestor: whenever twins were born into his family line, one would grow up to be good while the other would become evil and serve Beelzebub.

In the present day, the protagonist learns that his twin brother, Alex, is going to suffer the curse. Boris, their uncle, has died and left them with his waxworks in his will, as well a crystal ball, through which his spirit communicates with his nephew. Boris informs his nephew that, to save Alex, he must rid the family of Ixona's curse by using the waxworks to travel through four locations in different time periods: an Ancient Egyptian pyramid, Victorian-era London, a zombie-infested cemetery, and an abandoned mine. Within each location, he is to defeat one of the four worst evil twins—the High Priest, a worshipper of Anubis; Jack the Ripper, a serial killer that sacrificed call girls to Beelzebub; Vladimir, a necromancer who raised a zombie army; and the Evil One, a cult leader who transformed himself and his followers into plant mutants.

Once all the evil twins have been defeated, Boris declares that the only way to break the curse is to prevent it from being cast in the first place, and provides his nephew with four artifacts from the evil twins: the High Priest's amulet, Jack the Ripper's knife, Vladimir's ring, and a vial of the Evil One's potion. Using the final waxwork, the protagonist travels to confront Ixona, and, following Boris' instructions, uses the artifacts to kill Ixona before she can place the curse. As a result, the curse is erased from existence for every afflicted generation of the protagonist's family line. The protagonist returns to the present and revives Alex, who tells him about a dream in which Ixona placed a curse upon her attacker before she died, transforming him into a demon. The brothers then leave the museum.

== Development ==
Waxworks was in development over the course of two years. In a 1992 interview with Zero magazine, designer Michael Woodroffe: "With the system we use, which we also invented and developed, we're able to complete a massive game such as Waxworks in about seven, eight or, at the most, nine months ... we can do everything with a small amount of people. Just three artists ... Waxworks has been put together by a team, essentially, of five." In response to being asked if any of the gore had to be censored in the game due to objection from the publisher, Woodroffe responded "Not really, no ... [the artists are] given a total brief - which they hardly ever stick to ... but they're kept within fairly strict guidelines."

The game uses the AGOS engine, which is a modified version of the AberMUD 5 engine. The story for Waxworks was developed by Rick Moran. Original music was composed by Jezz Woodroffe who worked with John Canfield for the sound design. Producers Todd Thorson and Mark Wallace worked with the help of David Friedland and Tricia Woodroffe, who managed the technical resources. Woodroffe also stated that the game was heavily inspired by the 1988 film Waxwork. Furthermore, a fight with the Marquis de Sade, who was a major character in the film, was cut from the game. Similarities between the game and the movie include time travel using waxwork displays and the artifacts belonging to those within the displays having magical properties.

Woodroffe stated that there will be "numerous kings and queens ... There'll also be triffids" and that there will be a devil worship scene with "chanting and leaping about." Some of the plant mutant traps in the finished game bear a close resemblance to Triffids. Kings and queens are absent from the game entirely, however in the Egypt level the player takes the role of a prince saving a princess from being sacrificed by a cult, but there is no chanting or outright worship depicted and the cult does not worship the devil: it is a cult of Anubis.

The DOS release retains the Amiga 32-color palette rather than 256-color VGA graphics. This was the last game made by Horror Soft before they became Adventure Soft, the company known for the Simon the Sorcerer series.

In a pre-release blurb for Waxworks in Amiga Action, the introduction, particularly surrounding Uncle Boris, is different than what is in the final game. The introduction outlined in Amiga Action begins in a graveyard, rather than at Uncle Boris' waxworks, and Uncle Boris is stated to contact the protagonist telepathically, rather than with a crystal ball as in the final game. Upon visiting Boris' tomb, it is "blown open and the coffin disappears. Looking into the tomb, [the protagonist] sees images of himself and his brother Alex lying dead at the bottom." The backstory represented in the manual and The Curse of the Twins booklet included with the game also has nothing related to this pre-release introduction, possibly indicating it was scrapped and the story was reworked before release.

In 2009, the game was re-released on GOG.com using DOSBox with compatibility for macOS and Windows.

=== Copy protection ===
At the beginning of the game, the player is prompted to enter a 4-digit code which requires the use of a 3-ply code wheel to determine the answer. The wheel has a symbol, a monster and a place on the three rings, the third ring having two different words and two different codes on several of the answers. If the player fails to enter the correct answer three times, the game closes itself and suggests that the player refer to the manual.

== Reception ==
Reception

Review scores
Publication	Score
Dragon	5/5 (DOS)
Amiga Joker	82% (Amiga)
The One	78% (Amiga)
PC Games	62% (DOS)
Datormagazin	3/5 (Amiga)
Power Play Magazine	57% (DOS)

Award
Publication	Award
Computer Gaming World	Role-Playing Game of the Year 1993 (Nominated)

Many reviewers noted the game's gore, with Amiga Joker calling it "pretty horrible, horribly pretty" and "shocking", and PC Games saying "Waxworks is definitely only for enthusiastic horrorfreaks." The One refers to Waxworks' gore as "very gruesome ... a lot of this stuff is genuinely stomach-turning". In addition, the store page for the GOG release refers to it as "A dungeon crawler known for its gore and death scenes."

Computer Gaming World criticized the small game maps, overemphasis on combat, and the IBM PC version's use of an Amiga-like 32-color palette instead of 256-color VGA graphics, but liked the "very atmospheric" soundtrack. The magazine concluded that despite flaws, the game was "better than most" CRPGs, and that "for those who revel in the macabre" ... Waxworks continues to satisfy the bent toward the supernatural". Computer Gaming World nominated Waxworks for game of the year under the role-playing category.

The One gave the Amiga version of Waxworks an overall score of 78%, stating they "like the game's episodic nature - the way it's broken down into separate mini-adventures is far more suited to my tastes ... it adds variety to the fun, and as a result the game's much fresher than most run-of-the-mill RPGs", and complimented the game's atmosphere and express that "The moody graphics and soundtrack combine to create a strong sense of tension". The One criticized the game's gratuitous gore.
