= Darkseed (band) =

German gothic metal band

- Origin: Munich, Germany
- Genres: Gothic metal, heavy metal, death/doom (early)
- Years active: 1992–2006, 2008–2015
- Labels: Nuclear Blast, Massacre, Serenades
- Past members: Stefan Hertrich; Harald Winkler; Mike Schmutzer; Andi Wecker; Jadek Dworok; Thomas Herrmann; Tom Gilcher; Rico Galvagno; Martin Motnik; Michael Behnke; Maurizio Guolo; Armin Dörfler
- Website: darkseed.com

Darkseed was a German gothic metal band formed in 1992. Darkseed, beginning as a death metal band, took a more unconventional song writing method that aimed more towards the gothic experimental route. They changed their music to gothic metal on their first studio album Midnight Solemnly Dance.

== History ==
=== Early years, death metal era (1992–1994) ===
Beginning as a death metal band, Darkseed released two demo albums in 1992 and 1993, playing more gothic experimental routes, not wanting to take the traditional methods of generic death metal, followed by their EP, Romantic Tales, in 1994 which was re-issued in 1998.

=== Stylistic change, mainstream success, break-up (1994–2006) ===
Serenades Records release Darkseed's first studio album, Midnight Solemnly Dance in 1996, in which they changed into a gothic metal act. Nuclear Blast caught up with the band in their second release Spellcraft a year later, in which they continued playing gothic metal having influence from heavy metal music. The album was well received and a critical success. They had several line-up changes after their underground success, which resulted in Darkseed's year-long hiatus. During this period, a re-issued version Romantic Tales was released. Finally, after several line-up changes, the band released their third album Give me Light in 1999, followed by their next album Diving into Darkness in 2000 which was well received by the critics. Lead vocalist Stefan Hertrich left the band in 2003, only to return in 2004 to make "Ultimate Darkness", which was released in 2005. In 2006, he and Martin Motnik left the band again, thus effectively forcing the band to disband.

=== Reunion ===
On 24 June 2008, on their official website, Darkseed announced that they would reunite to appear live at the Helion Festival on October 4, 2008. On 3 September 2008, the band announced that their old back vocalist and drummer, Harald Winkler, will rejoin the band as lead vocalist and so Darkseed will be reformed and reborn, with a new album, Poison Awaits, scheduled to be released on 23 July 2010.

=== Second break-up (2014) ===
In December 2014, the band has announced on their official website that they decided to put the band "on hold" due to certain circumstances, and that one day they might come back again.

== Musical style ==
Darkseed started as a death metal band. AllMusic defines them as "not wanting to take the traditional methods of generic death metal that everyone's heard a million times since Napalm Death's "Scum", Germany's Darkseed take a more unconventional song writing method that aims more towards the gothic experimental route". In their first studio album, they changed their music to gothic metal and became a part of German gothic metal movement. Later they changed their style into a more traditional heavy metal sound. They also have an influence from industrial metal music, as two of the members stated to be fans of Neue Deutsche Härte band Rammstein.

== Members ==
=== Former members ===
- Stefan Hertrich – vocals, programming (1992–2003, 2004–2006)
- Harald Winkler – drums (1992–1996), vocals (2008–2012)
- Mike Schmutzer – vocals (2012–2015)
- Andi Wecker (deceased) – guitars (1992–1998)
- Jacek Dworok – guitars (1992–1995)
- Thomas Herrmann – guitars (1995–2006, 2008–2015)
- Tom Gilcher – guitars (1999–2006, 2008–2015)
- Rico Galvagno – bass (1995–1999)
- Martin Motnik – bass (2003–2006)
- Michael Behnke – bass (2009–2015)
- Maurizio Guolo – drums (2004–2006, 2008–2015)
- Armin Dörfler – keyboards (2003–2006, 2008–2015)

=== Guest members ===
- Sasema – female vocals on Midnight Solemnly Dance and Astral Adventures
- Willi Wurm – drums (1997–2000)
- Marcus B. – drums on Astral Adventures
- Sandra Ott – flute on Midnight Solemnly Dance
- Christian Decker – piano on Midnight Solemnly Dance
- Raimund Repp – violin on Midnight Solemnly Dance
- Catharina Boutai – female vocals on Spellcraft
- Christina Mann – female vocals on Spellcraft
- Gan Pierre Gelke – piano and Keyboard on Spellcraft
- Doris Zwemuller – female vocals on Give Me Light
- Gabriel Isuku – percussion on Give Me Light

== Discography ==
=== Demos ===
- Sharing the Grave (1992)
- Darksome Thoughts (1993)

=== EPs ===
- Romantic Tales (1994)

=== Studio albums ===
- Midnight Solemnly Dance (1996)
- Spellcraft (1997)
- Romantic Tales (re-issued 1998)
- Give Me Light (1999)
- Diving into Darkness (2000)
- Astral Adventures (2003)
- Ultimate Darkness (2005)
- Poison Awaits (2010)
- Astral Darkness Awaits (compilation) (2012)
