= Izaac Enciso =

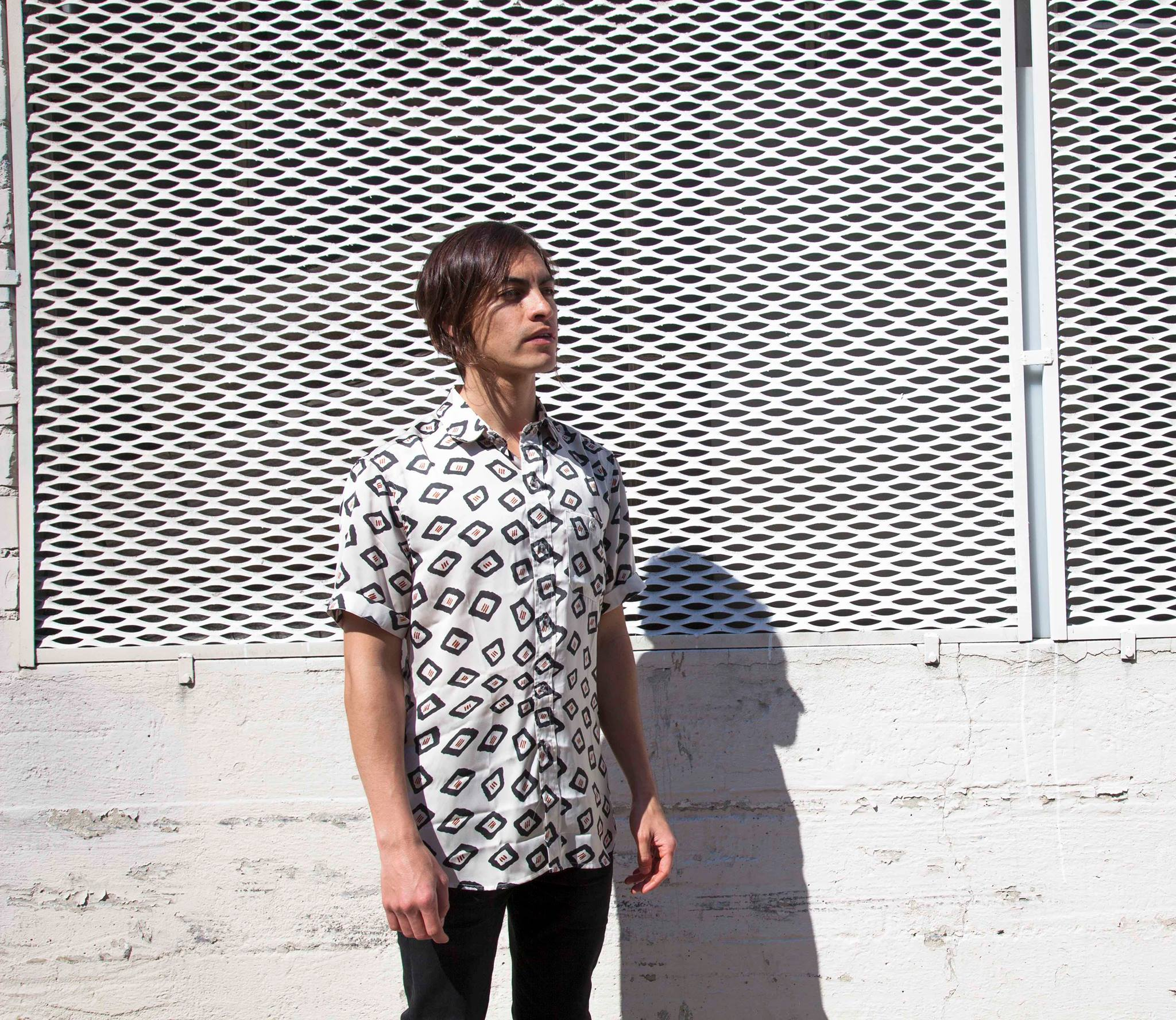
Izaac Enciso - 2013

Izaac Darío Enciso Castillo (Mexico City, October 14, 1980) is a visual artist working across several disciplines including digital art, photography and film. He is known for his abstract and conceptual photography. Commercially, Enciso works as a director, photographer and art director.

== Early life and education ==
Izaac Enciso is the second son of the renowned Mexican cardiologist Jose Manuel Enciso-Muñoz (Father) and dentist Alicia Castillo Zapata (Mother). His father was the president of the Mexican Association of Cardiology for the period 2014–2016. His mother has played an important role as a supporting person throughout Enciso's life.

Enciso studied at the University of Barcelona, where he obtained an MFA in audiovisual production and content development. He also graduated from the Universidad de Monterrey with a bachelor's degree in advertising / international marketing. He continued his education with courses and diplomas in film production at the Autonomous University of Nuevo León and Concordia University in Montreal, He attended the program for Motion Graphics at the Gnomon School of Visual Effects in Hollywood, California, Art Direction at the Underground School of Creatives in Buenos Aires and a Photography Portfolio Revision at Centro ADM in Mexico City by photographer Stefan Ruiz.

== Work ==
Enciso's work oscillates between the abstract, conceptual and graphic art. He utilizes computer software for 3D modeling, digital painting and design from which he conceives work that is turned into physical pieces. In photography he does visual research exploring with “on camera” techniques such as filters, light and visual illusions. Formally, his work is intended to expand the limits of visual perception and aesthetics. At the social level, Enciso's work is concerned with environmental, political, health, technological, human rights, animal rights and ethical matters. His work across all disciplines depicts emotions and personal stories with an underlying spiritual subtext.

=== Recent Work ===
On his work Symbols, in search of incongruity and the unexpected, Enciso embarked on long, slow walks in Los Angeles and cities in Mexico to find lived-in places, marked by prior actions and behavior. His street photography engaged with the traces of strangers, a play between unknown actors where streets became scenes. Sometimes he created his own interventions, interacting with certain objects or constructions with the intent to leave something behind for someone else to encounter. As a photographer, Enciso is not a documentarian but rather someone who is interested in the potential of everyday scenes and objects to create an emotional or conceptual impression. Seeing the ordinary as extraordinary, he makes arrangements within the frame of his viewfinder by manipulating objects, shapes and forms through processes of call, response and spontaneous improvisation. “Symbols is Enciso’s love letter to the lived-in city and a testament to his openness, awareness and sensitivity. It presents a conception of visual art as a gracious form of service and image-making as an expression of gratitude". Le Roy

Izaac Enciso is represented by Visual Artists Group Los Angeles, CA.

=== Commercial Work ===
Commercially, Enciso has produced work in Mexico and in the Hispanic and general US Markets for major companies such as Comcast, Time Warner Cable, Wells Fargo, Toyota, Got Milk, the Food and Drug Administration and Fairfax recordings of Disney Music Group. His ideas have been broadcast nationwide in the US and have earned marketing and advertising awards for the companies he had produced the work for. He has also collaborated on films and documentaries as a researcher for directors Carlos Bolado and Antonio Macia.

In 2009, Izaac Enciso and his brother José Manuel Enciso started their multi-media company called FOG. In the early years of his career, Enciso worked as a writer, concept artist and production assistant for commercials, films and music videos in Mexico City and Barcelona.

=== Side projects ===
With previous experience as a DJ and after attending the Garnish Music Production School in Hollywood, Enciso started his electronic music project "Dropresponse". In 2023, Enciso composed the music for the short film Luchar por un Sueño (Fighting for a Dream).

== Books ==
- Symbols, Izaac Enciso. Le Roy Publishing (2016) ISBN 9780473336530
