= Simon the Sorcerer =

1993 video game

- European box art
- Developer: Adventure Soft
- Publisher: Adventure Soft
- Director: Mike Woodroffe
- Producers: Mike Woodroffe; Alan Bridgman
- Designer: Simon Woodroffe
- Programmer: Alan Bridgman
- Artist: Paul Drummond
- Writer: Simon Woodroffe
- Series: Simon the Sorcerer
- Platforms: Amiga, Amiga CD32, MS-DOS, RISC OS, iOS, Android, Windows
- Release: September 27, 1993
- Genre: Point-and-click adventure
- Mode: Single-player

Simon the Sorcerer is a 1993 point-and-click adventure game developed and published by Adventure Soft, for Amiga and MS-DOS. The story focuses on a boy named Simon who is transported into a parallel universe of magic and monsters, where he embarks on a mission to become a wizard and rescue another from an evil sorcerer. The setting was inspired by the novels of the Discworld series, and incorporates parodies on fantasy novels and fairy tales, such as The Lord of the Rings and Jack and the Beanstalk. The lead character's design was inspired by that of the fictional British television character Blackadder. The character was voiced by Chris Barrie in the CD re-release.

The game was well received by critics, who praised the humour, graphics and gameplay, with some minor criticism towards the plot. Simon the Sorcerer went on to become a video game series, with a sequel in 1995, Simon the Sorcerer II: The Lion, the Wizard and the Wardrobe. The game was later released for PC in 2008 on GOG.com. A 20th Anniversary Edition was developed by MojoTouch and released on Google Play in 2013.

== Gameplay ==
A screenshot of Simon the Sorcerer. The game employed the same style of verbal commands found in other titles at the time, including The Secret of Monkey Island.

As a point-and-click adventure game, the player controls the protagonist, Simon, by using the mouse. The iOS and Android versions use touchscreen controls instead. Gameplay involves the player moving Simon to different locations in the game, interacting with objects and other characters at each site. The player can make Simon perform actions through verbal commands like "Look at", "Talk to", and "Give", with objects that are picked up being placed into an inventory. Using these items requires the right verbal command and then selecting the target for that object. The game primarily involves talking to people for information, including hints or acquiring items, and using the correct items to solve puzzles. A menu system is provided for loading, saving and quitting the game via a postcard contained in the inventory. A fast-travel system is also provided in the form of a map in the inventory that can be used up until a certain point in the story.

== Synopsis ==
=== Setting ===
The story takes place in a parallel universe to the real world, where magic and monsters exist, although it contains some modern items and elements. The game's world features elements that are parodies of those from popular fantasy novels and fairy tales, including Rapunzel, The Lord of the Rings, Discworld, The Chronicles of Narnia, Jack and the Beanstalk, and the Three Billy Goats Gruff.

=== Plot ===
On his 12th birthday, a young boy named Simon is surprised when he receives a dog as a present from his parents, which he names Chippy. Unknown to Simon, his parents found the dog at their front door without warning, wrapped in paper, and possessing a book that nobody could read and which was eventually dumped in the loft. Sometime after his birthday, Simon hears Chippy playing around in the loft, to which he discovers it holding the book in its mouth. Reading it, he notes it is titled "Ye Olde Spellbooke", and unwittingly blurts out a spell on one of the pages. A portal suddenly appears, which Chippy enters. Simon follows after him and ends up in another world, dressed in a wizard's robe. After Chippy helps Simon escape a group of goblins, Simon follows Chippy to a village, and is brought to the home of the wizard Calypso.

Inside the house, Simon finds a letter addressed to him from Calypso, who reveals he was responsible for bringing him into his world to help defeat the evil sorcerer Sordid. Simon learns Calypso has since been kidnapped and that he must rescue the wizard in order to be able to go home. Per Calypso's instructions, Simon meets with a group of wizards in the village pub and asks them to make him a wizard. Carrying out a task set by them and paying them a small fee, Simon is made a wizard, and works to find the items needed to breach Sordid's mountain lair. After gaining entry to the tower with a potion that shrinks him, Simon overcomes further difficulties before returning to normal height to explore the tower. In Sordid's bedroom, he learns that the sorcerer created a wand which can turn people into stone, and can only be destroyed in the Fiery Pits of Rondor where Sordid had travelled to. Finding the wand in the tower, Simon uses a teleporter to reach Rondor, destroys the wand, and then defeats Sordid by pushing him into the fiery pits.

Sent back to his world, Simon awakens in his bedroom, assuming it was a dream. However, another portal opens in his room, whereupon a large gloved hand appears to take him back through.

== Development and release ==
Mike Woodroffe, Simon the Sorcerer's director and producer, wanted to create the game to exploit a market for comic adventure games, which he realised existed due to the success of Monkey Island 2: LeChuck's Revenge. His son, Simon, penned the script. He was inspired by Terry Pratchett (Adventure Soft originally intended to make a Discworld game, but were unable to obtain a licence), and he and his father hoped that he would become involved with the game. Although he chose not to become involved, the script still contained his original humour. Many scenes are based on fairy tales, and the Wise Owl was modelled on Patrick Moore. Woodroffe said that Adventure Soft (then known as HorrorSoft) had done enough horror games and wanted to try a comedy game. Switching genres prompted the name change.

Simon Woodroffe explained the character of Simon was a mixture of Blackadder, Rincewind, and Guybrush, and that he was originally intended to be a trainee wizard, similar to Harry Potter. He also explained he was invented because they needed someone to compete with characters such as Rincewind, and that the game was inspired by the Discworld books and Monkey Island. Mike Woodroffe said that the game was inspired by Dungeons & Dragons' magic stories. Other influences, according to Simon Woodroffe, included Red Dwarf, Fawlty Towers, and Monty Python. The character was invented during a journey on the M5 motorway, and was not named after Woodroffe. The name "Simon the Sorcerer" had that format due to the magical nature of the character, and because other names, such as "Willy The Wizard", were rejected since they were disliked. Simon the Sorcerer was developed by a team of 15 people. There was an effort to be British in order to distinguish themselves from the humour of Monkey Island. Simon Woodroffe stated that his greatest challenges were the script creation and puzzle design, and he tuned the scripts (which were written in an in-house scripting language) continuously. The world was created for the characters rather than the puzzles, and the story was wrapped around characters the team liked. Woodroffe believed that Adventure Soft were able to rival more experienced studios due to their small team, all of whom had the same goals and passion for the game. On deciding which fairy tales to feature in the game, Simon Woodroffe said he "read a whole bunch of that kind of stuff", including the Grimms' Fairy Tales, and he also owned Ladybird Books when he was growing up. He said that there were some he "really wanted" to include, such as The Magic Porridge Pot, but could not.

Alan Brigman was the technical director and co-producer. He and Mike Woodroffe developed a game creation system, Adventure Graphic Operating System (AGOS) II, which facilitated the development of Simon the Sorcerer and enabled the team to focus on the gameplay and story without worrying about the technical aspects. The system allowed the developers to input text commands on a separate monitor, and the engine could be ported to other platforms. Other features included translating actions performed by the mouse into text commands (a sentence parser carries them out), the loading of data as needed, and functions could be implemented by the addition of commands. The game was built as a database, which contained tables for rooms and objects. These tables contained animation code and information about what is supposed to happen. Alan Cox was also involved in the development of the AGOS engine, which is based on AberMUD.

The art was developed by Paul Drummond (lead artist), Kevin Preston (who hand-drew the character art and animation), Maria Drummond, Jeff Wall, and Karen Pinchin. This team were based at a studio in Newcastle, rather than Birmingham, the central studio. Their work included character animations, developed in Autodesk Animator using its language POCO, which the graphics tools were built in. The artwork (including the sprites) was made as a selection of clips, and a final image was formed by pasting them together. The ability to use clips in multiple locations, and the colour information being stored separately and used on an as—needed basis meant that the art took much less space than normal. The background artwork was sketched in black-and-white, and then scanned into a computer and colourised. The music is credited to Media Sorcery (Adam Gilmore and Mark McLeod).

Simon the Sorcerer was released on floppy disk in 1993 for the Amiga and IBM PC compatibles. It was re-released in 1994 for the Amiga CD32 and PC CD-ROM, with an enhanced soundtrack featuring Chris Barrie as the voice of Simon. Simon Woodroffe stated that he had Barrie in mind when writing the scripts (Woodroffe said he is a fan of Red Dwarf and Arnold Rimmer), and it was easier for him to do so when thinking of an actor he knew speaking the lines. It cost around £3,000 per day to hire Barrie. Woodroffe said there was "no hesitation" in doing a talkie version, and that it was "the next big thing". He also said that Barrie was "very patient and professional". Simon the Sorcerer used the visual and interface designs from LucasArts' games, and Woodroffe said this was because they had set a standard, and Adventure Soft's focus was humour and story-telling.

The PC version was later ported to Microsoft Windows. The game was published in the United States by Activision. A patch was released, fixing compatibility issues with Windows ME, 2000, and XP. Simon the Sorcerer was released on GOG.com in December 2008. In 2009, the game was re-released for the iPhone by iPhSoft. A new version titled '20th Anniversary Edition was developed by MojoTouch and released for Android in August 2013. This version featured new animations and icons, remastered music, high-definition graphics, and updated game menus. A 25th Anniversary Edition was released on the iOS App Store, Steam and GOG.com on 3 April 2018. A sequel, Simon the Sorcerer II: The Lion, the Wizard and the Wardrobe, was released in 1995.

== Reception ==
Reception

Aggregate score
| Aggregator | Score |
|---|---|
| GameRankings | 86% |

Review scores
| Publication | Score |
|---|---|
| Adventure Gamers | 4/5 (DOS) |
| Amiga Action | 90% (Amiga) |
| Amiga Computing | 89% (Amiga); 80% (CD32) |
| Amiga Format | 70% (Amiga); 80% (CD32) |
| Amiga Power | 57% (CD32) |
| Computer and Video Games | 86% (CD32) |
| Gamezebo | 4/5 (PC) |
| Hyper | 91% (PC) |
| Jeuxvideo.com | 17/20 (DOS & Amiga) |
| Joystick | 85% (PC) |
| PC Zone | 86% |
| Pocket Gamer | 7/10 (iOS) |
| CU Amiga | 90% (Amiga); 90% (CD32) |
| The One | 89% (Amiga); 89% (CD32) |

Simon the Sorcerer received critical acclaim: across all platforms, the humour and visuals in particular were commended, although criticisms included the controls and the linear nature. The game's global sales surpassed 600,000 units by September 1999.

The Amiga version received generally high ratings. CU Amiga praised the high quality graphics and how much fun the game was to play. Amiga Computing's Simon Clays also praised the graphics and the locations, saying the locations' stylisation made the game resemble a fairy tale. He also enjoyed the puzzles and detail in the game. The One's reviewer said the graphics are "excellent", but believed the music did not take full advantage of the Amiga's sound hardware. A reviewer of Génération 4 found the Amiga version's graphics to be "magnificent".

The CD32 version was noted for its speech. CU Amiga's Dean Evans was impressed with "sumptuous" backgrounds and the animation, and believed the main selling point was the digitised speech, especially Chris Barrie as Simon. Jonathan Nash of Amiga Power liked the "gorgeous" graphics, but thought the dialogue was annoying, and he also criticised the puzzles as "spread thinly over the pointlessly large playing area". The reviewer of Amiga CD32 Gamer was impressed with the soundtrack, describing it as "top notch", and thought the story had plenty of wit. The main criticism was the scenes downplaying interaction, making the comedy linear. The One's reviewer corroborated others' opinions on the graphics, finding them to be "stunning", and also believed the atmosphere was augmented by the speech. Chris Barrie as Simon was believed by Amiga Computing to "greatly enhance" the game by giving the speech a new appeal. Amiga Format's reviewer criticised the controls, believing the controller's limitations would make players "an insane hysterical gibbering wreck", but complimented the addition of speech, and echoed others' opinions on the graphics by calling them "beautiful". In a later review, Andy Smith believed that Barrie's voice acting livened the humour, and concurred with Evans' evaluation of the graphics as "sumptuous", but said it was difficult to get the game working on an Amiga 1200.

Reviewers of the DOS and Windows versions praised the humour and dialogue. The reviewers of Génération 4 described the adventure as "excellent", and believed Simon the Sorcerer might be the most amusing and idiosyncratic adventure game. Computer Gaming World stated that the "wacky, tongue-in-cheek interactive fantasy [...] features a rich world of tasty puzzles designed to test the wits of the most astute adventurer while keeping the humor dial turned up to the max". Jeuxvideo.com described the characters' dialogue as "crazy" and praised the amount of humour, but they believed the adventure is over too quickly. Their review of the Amiga version was identical. Tawny Ditmer of Gamezebo lauded the story as "hilarious" and the scenery and music as "wonderfully colorful and cheery", criticised the lack of side-quests and pointed out that the original graphics looks outdated in 2009. The script and dialogue were praised as "fantastic" by Rob Franklin of Adventure Gamers, and complimented Chris Barrie's "brilliant" voice acting, but criticised the plot for being vague. He recommended the game for fans of adventure games and British humour. Zoltán Ormándi of Adventure Classic Gaming thought highly of the puzzles' originality and Simon's humour. He claimed the game's popularity caused a term, "Simonology" to be coined describing the humour of an adventure's protagonist. GameRankings wrote the PC version has a rating of 86 per cent. The reviewer of Joystick liked the decoration, animation, and characters.

Paul Marchant of Pocket Gamer reviewed the iOS version, and said that it was the game he liked, rather than the iPhone implementation. He thought the game was a "classic" and described the dialogue as "original". Damian Chiappara of AppSpy believed the iOS version's graphics are improved over the original, and liked the "quirky" humour, but thought that it can take time for players to familiarise themselves with its controls. The iPad and Android versions appeared on Pocket Gamer's Top 10 point-and-click adventure games for their respective platforms.

In 2011, Adventure Gamers named Simon the Sorcerer the 44th-best adventure game ever released.
