= Gerald Woodroffe =

British keyboardist

Gerald "Jezz" Woodroffe (born 28 October 1951, in Birmingham) is an English keyboardist. He was a member of Purusha, Sally Hope and Geezer Butler Band, as well as playing live for Black Sabbath in the late 1970s.

== Career ==
He played on the Technical Ecstasy album by Black Sabbath. Although he is not given songwriting credit on the album, "he was present when Tony wrote material for Technical Ecstasy, allowing Tony to try out ideas while Jezz supplied chords as accompaniment.” Keyboards play a strong part in the style and texture of this album. Woodroffe also performed and recorded with Robert Plant and Phil Collins on the album Pictures at Eleven, Plant's debut solo album, as well Plant's following two albums, The Principle of Moments and Shaken 'n' Stirred.

He performed live with the band on the tours for the albums Sabotage and Technical Ecstasy.

In the early 1990s, Woodroffe composed the music to two games by Horror Soft; Elvira II: The Jaws of Cerberus (with Philip Nixon), and Waxworks.

In the 1970s, he was the owner of "Woodroffes" music store in Birmingham.
