= Simon the Sorcerer 3D =

2002 video game

- European PC box art
- Developer: Headfirst Productions
- Publisher: Adventure Soft
- Designers: Simon Woodroffe, Andrew Brazier
- Composer: Tony Flynn
- Series: Simon the Sorcerer
- Engine: NetImmerse
- Platform: Windows
- Release: April 19, 2002
- Genre: Adventure
- Mode: Single-player

Simon the Sorcerer 3D (also known as Simon 3D), is an adventure game released by Adventure Soft in April 2002 for Windows. It is the third game in the Simon the Sorcerer series.

As indicated by the title, the game was the first in the series with 3D graphics. The publisher's website claims that there are over 40 hours of gameplay, and reviews stated that the game world includes over 10,000 pieces of voiced dialogue. The sarcastic attitude and cruel humour of the series remain. Brian Bowles returns as the voice of Simon.

== Plot ==
The story picks up some time after Simon the Sorcerer II: The Lion, the Wizard and the Wardrobe. It opens with a lengthy cutscene explaining how Simon's body, which had been separated from his soul by Sordid in the second game, was recovered and "rejoined" with his soul. At the start of the game Simon's immediate objective is to get to the city Poliganis and join Calypso. Before he can do this several smaller tasks have to be completed, in typical adventure game fashion. Upon arriving in Poliganis he is greeted by Melissa Leg, the heroine who apparently rescued his body from Sordid. She wants a favour in return: for Simon to track down the Swampling and let her know of his whereabouts. Once Simon finds the Swampling, there follow several revelations concerning the game's storyline, as well as the origins of the Universe.

== Development ==
Development started as a traditional 2D point-and-click adventure game, but due to lack of publisher interest the design team chose to switch to a 3D adventure game. The project suffered from a long development time, with the engine change and a change of publisher adding 18 months. The game was originally supposed to be published by Hasbro Interactive under the MicroProse banner, but they left the project at the last minute and shortly afterwards sold themselves to Infogrames. As a result of this failed partnership, there are numerous allusions to Hasbro and its products which are still present in the game. Also because of this publishing issue, the finished game had to remain unreleased for over two years until Adventure Soft went on to publish the game themselves.

== Reception ==
Simon 3D received generally mixed reviews, earning a Critic score on GameSpot of 5.8, and a GameRankings score of 58%. Citing outdated graphics and poor controls, reviewers did however praise the game's story, humour and gameplay as being faithful to the series.

Mike Woodroffe later wrote that he felt that the move to 3D for the third Simon game was a mistake.
