= Personal Nightmare =

1989 video game

- Developer: Horror Soft
- Publisher: Horror Soft
- Director: Mike Woodroffe
- Producer: Mike Woodroffe
- Designer: Keith Wadhams
- Programmers: Alan Bridgman; Alan Cox
- Artist: Teoman Irmak
- Engine: Adventure Graphic Operating System
- Platforms: Amiga, Atari ST, MS-DOS
- Release: 1989
- Genre: Adventure
- Mode: Single-player

Personal Nightmare is a horror adventure game developed and published by Horror Soft for the Amiga, Atari ST and MS-DOS in 1989. It was released digitally by Adventure Soft in July 2009 on GOG.com.

== Plot ==
The game focuses on a town where The Devil has invaded and the player has four days to eliminate all possessed citizens (led by a witch and a vampire) and finally purge the evil by defeating the Devil himself before he can take over.

== Gameplay ==
The game makes use of a combination of text-based commands, clickable verbal commands and clickable objects to progress. A compass indicates which directions the player can travel. Much of the game's movement and actions are real-time based so there is a day and night cycle, and other characters go about their business throughout the adventure. The player's inventory can be viewed in the respective menu. There are many encounters that can kill the protagonist (ideally at night time) unless the player performs a proper action to avoid them. Newer versions of the game omitted the encounters where the players gets garroted. The player loses the game if four days pass and all the required possessed citizens have not been killed and the devil has not been repelled.

== Reception ==
Reception

Review scores
Publication	Score
Computer and Video Games	84% (Amiga, Atari ST)
Zzap!64	87% (Amiga)
CU Amiga	74% (Amiga)
Datormagazin	7/10 (Amiga)

Personal Nightmare was generally well-received, including the ratings of 87% by Zzap! (Amiga), 84% by Computer + Video Games (Amiga and Atari ST), 74% by CU Amiga (Amiga) and 7/10 by Datormagazin (Amiga).
