= Adventure Soft =

British video game developer

- Formerly: Horror Soft
- Type: Private
- Industry: Video games
- Founded: 1992; 34 years ago
- Headquarters: Sutton Coldfield, England, UK
- Key people: Mike Woodroffe; Simon Woodroffe
- Products: Simon the Sorcerer series
- Website: adventuresoft.com

Adventure Soft is a British video game developer and publisher established by Mike Woodroffe, initially as an importer and reseller of Adventure International games as Adventure International (UK), and later using the names Horror Soft, Adventuresoft UK and Headfirst Productions. The firm operates out of Sutton Coldfield, and is best known for the Simon the Sorcerer series of games.

== Adventure International UK ==
Woodroffe, who owned a music shop in Birmingham, entered the software industry by opening a computer department within the store, Calisto Computers, importing American software which was otherwise unavailable in the UK. The success of many of the titles from Adventure International led to Woodroffe licensing the name from Scott Adams to form Adventure International (UK). The company employed Brian Howarth, the author of the Mysterious Adventures series of text adventures, to convert Adams' titles to run on microcomputers found in the United Kingdom market which were not currently supported.

By 1985, the release of games by Adventure International had slowed and the company began to write other games using the same system. The first and most successful of these was Gremlins – The Adventure (1985), written by Howarth and based on the film Gremlins. Adventure International UK also secured the rights to Howarth's Mysterious Adventures series from Channel 8 Software who had been taken over by Argus Press Software. Several of these games were licensed for release by Tynesoft, who also published Howarth and Woodroofe's Supergran: The Adventure, their first title to be published by a third party.

Further deals were signed, including a game based on the television series Robin of Sherwood, and the licence to produce games based on the Fighting Fantasy gamebooks by Steve Jackson and Ian Livingstone. The first Fighting Fantasy title released was Seas of Blood by Woodroffe and Howarth with Appointment with F.E.A.R. reported as the next conversion.

== Adventuresoft UK ==
By 1986 Adventure International in the U.S. was bankrupt, leaving the UK company unable to continue trading under that name. A new company was formed, Adventuresoft UK, whose first title was their second Fighting Fantasy conversion, Rebel Planet, written by Stefan Ufnowski and published by U.S. Gold. U.S. Gold published further Adventuresoft titles over the next few years, including Ufnowski's Kayleth (based on story in Asimov's Science Fiction magazine, Temple of Terror by Woodroffe and Masters of the Universe: The Super Adventure. In 1988, Adventuresoft also worked with U.S. Gold to produce Heroes of the Lance based on the first Dragonlance campaign module for the Dungeons & Dragons role-playing game. Adventuresoft also created Blizzard Pass, the first game by Alan Cox which was bundled with the ZX Spectrum +2 by some retailers. Cox later developed parts of the game into AberMUD.

== Horror Soft ==
With the rise of more powerful systems like the Amiga and a growing mainstream disinterest in text-focused games, Woodroffe created Horror Soft to actively exploit the graphical and multimedia angle of the games.

Their first 16-bit game, Personal Nightmare, features music, animation and some mouse control coupled with a traditional text-based game system. It was followed by two games based around Elvira, Mistress of the Dark: Elvira: Mistress of the Dark and Elvira II: The Jaws of Cerberus, and Waxworks, all of which moved away from keyboard command input to mouse-driven gaming with animation and music from Jezz Woodroffe (a session musician with Robert Plant, Black Sabbath and other bands).

== Adventure Soft Publishing ==
Adventuresoft was remodelled as Adventure Soft Publishing in 1992, although the company wasn't incorporated until 1998 and the company continued to be referred to as Adventuresoft in the gaming press. The company continuing the trend towards more graphical gaming with the release of Simon the Sorcerer, their most successful game. The game uses a new engine, the "Adventure Graphic Operating System", written by Alan Cox and based on AberMUD. It also includes voice acting from Roger Blake and Chris Barrie as Simon who played Arnold Rimmer in Red Dwarf. Barrie was replaced by Brian Bowles for the sequel when Barrie’s fees became unaffordable. In 1997 Adventure Soft released The Feeble Files, with the lead character being voiced by Robert Llewellyn who played Kryten also in Red Dwarf.

== Headfirst Productions ==
In 1998 Mike and Simon Woodroffe set up Headfirst Productions to allow them to develop non-adventure style games. The company released Simon the Sorcerer 3D in 2002 and Call of Cthulhu: Dark Corners of the Earth in 2005. The intellectual property rights to Simon the Sorcerer remained with Adventure Soft, so were unaffected when Headfirst first went into administration the following year.
