= Simon the Sorcerer (series) =

Video game series

Simon the Sorcerer is a series of point-and-click adventure games created by British developer Adventure Soft. The series follows the adventures of an unwilling hero of the same name and has a strong fantasy setting similar to Sierra's King's Quest and Westwood's The Legend of Kyrandia series. The game varies in style, however, as it is more poised to be a parody of the fantasy genre than a member of the genre itself, with many renowned folklore characters appearing differently from what they are generally presumed to be.

The first two games are often compared with the Monkey Island series in terms of style and humour, and the Terry Pratchett Discworld novels and derivative games. Unlike many older adventure games, several of the titles in the series are still available for purchase. The first and second games in the series are also playable using ScummVM.

== Games ==
=== Simon the Sorcerer ===
Simon the Sorcerer was released by Adventure Soft in January 1993 for MS-DOS and Amiga. The story begins with the protagonist, Simon, as an ordinary teenager. His dog Chippy discovers a chest in the loft of his house containing a spellbook titled "Ye Olde Spellbooke". Simon throws the book onto the floor in contempt, but a portal opens above it. Chippy goes through the portal and Simon follows.

After entering the portal, Simon finds himself in another world. After escaping from some goblins who intended to eat him, he discovers that he has been brought on a quest to rescue the wizard Calypso from the evil sorcerer Sordid.

The game includes parodies of various popular books and fairy tales, including Rapunzel, The Lord of the Rings, The Chronicles of Narnia, Jack and the Beanstalk, and the Three Billy Goats Gruff.

Simon is voiced by Chris Barrie. This game marks the first appearance of two somewhat inept demons, who are recurring characters throughout the remainder of the series.

=== Simon the Sorcerer II: The Lion, the Wizard and the Wardrobe ===
Simon the Sorcerer II: The Lion, the Wizard and the Wardrobe was released by Adventure Soft in 1995. The title is a parody of the Chronicles of Narnia book The Lion, the Witch and the Wardrobe. Brian Bowles voices Simon, making him sound older, presumably in his late-teens.

In the game, the father of a peasant boy, Runt, burns his book of magic and throws it into the centre of a pentagram on the floor, inadvertently bringing Sordid back to life as a spirit. He transfers his spirit to a robotic body, and sends a magical wardrobe to retrieve Simon from his own dimension. The wardrobe mistakenly brings Simon to the doorstep of Calypso's Magic Shop. Upon returning to consciousness Simon learns that, in order to return home, he must find the wardrobe's power source, called mucusade (a pun on Lucozade).

=== Simon the Sorcerer's Pinball ===
Cover arts for Simon the Sorcerer's Pinball and Simon the Sorcerer's Puzzle Pack

A pinball video game released in 1998 by Adventure Soft for Windows consisting of a single pinball table.

=== Simon the Sorcerer's Puzzle Pack ===
A puzzle game released in 1998 by Adventure Soft for Microsoft Windows. It contains three games:

- Swampy Adventures – The player must help the Swampling through 50 levels of puzzles as he attempts to rescue his children from the evil Sordid.
- NoPatience – A set of four solitaire card games, featuring a unique Simon the Sorcerer themed deck.
- Jumble – A twist on a sliding puzzle featuring a constantly changing animation.

The game also features a desktop virtual pet known as "Demon in My Pocket" as well as three Simon the Sorcerer desktop themes.

=== Simon the Sorcerer 3D (2002) ===
The third adventure game in the series, Simon the Sorcerer 3D was initially designed fully in 2D and was intended to be released as a high quality 2D adventure. Due to publisher hesitation in picking up a 2D title, the developers later decided to switch it to a 3D adventure game.

The game follows on directly after Simon the Sorcerer II's open ending, with a cutscene at the beginning telling the player a connecting story of how Simon's body was rejoined to his soul by a new character, Melissa.

=== Simon the Sorcerer 4: Chaos Happens ===
The fourth adventure game marks a return to the heralded point-and-click interface and features high quality pre-rendered backgrounds. The characters are in 3D.

The German version of this game was released 23 February 2007, and was developed by Silver Style Entertainment.

The English version of this game was released on 17 October 2008, and was published by Playlogic.

=== Simon the Sorcerer 5: Who'd Even Want Contact?! ===
In the fifth adventure game, aliens threaten the fantasy world. The German version was released for PC on 26 March 2009. It was released for digital download in English on 17 February 2010.

=== Simon the Sorcerer 6: Between Worlds ===
StoryBeasts, an Irish company based in Dublin undertook the sixth release of the series, announcing in 2014 that the original voice actor Chris Barrie was enrolled for Simon's voice.

In Between Worlds Simon returns to his British slacker roots and is forced to deal with a convergence of two worlds. As portals to another dimension begin to open up, he is forced to come face-to-face with his more hard-working, respectful and competent counterpart Simone with whom he must work to bring balance back to their universes.

The game harkens back to the original two Simon the Sorcerer games and was to feature fully hand-drawn 2D animated worlds and characters.

On 10 February 2016 StoryBeasts announced via their website that after two years of work in the game, both the planned Kickstarter campaign and the game development had been halted indefinitely due to unforeseen events.

The game was intended to be episodic. The game didn't get made due to funding and publisher difficulties.

=== Simon the Sorcerer Origins ===
In May 2022 the prequel game Simon the Sorcerer Origins was announced as being in development by Smallthing Studios. The game is set shortly before the events of the first installment and was released on 28 October 2025. Voiced as in the original game by Chris Barrie.

== Common elements ==
=== About Simon ===
Simon the Sorcerer is a teenager transported into a fantasy world as a sorcerer dressed in a cloak and pointy hat; his cloak and hat are purple in the first game, but change to red for the rest of the series (aside from possible magical colour changes in the third game). He must use his logic and magical skills to solve puzzles as he progresses through the games.

Simon is rude and insulting to many of the characters he meets. This tends to interfere with the success of his quests, forcing him to go to ridiculous lengths in order to complete puzzles. Simon also breaks the fourth wall with his comments about adventure games.

== See also ==
- ScummVM – Software that allows to play Simon the Sorcerer and Simon the Sorcerer II on several platforms
