= Jimmy Page discography =

Catologing of published recordings by Jimmy Page

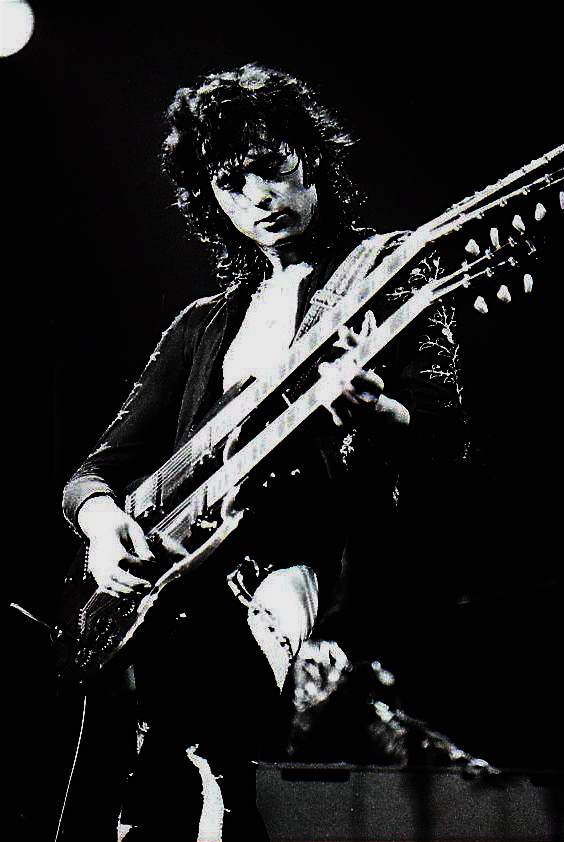
- Jimmy Page in Madison Square Garden with Led Zeppelin in 1973
- Studio albums: 4
- Soundtrack albums: 2
- Live albums: 2
- Singles: 16
- Guest appearances: 13

Jimmy Page is a British rock musician, best known as the guitarist and producer for English rock band Led Zeppelin. He has also participated in numerous solo and group projects since Led Zeppelin disbanded in 1980.

== Albums ==
=== Studio albums ===
Year	Album details	Peak chart positions										Certifications (sales thresholds)
Year	Album details	US	AUS	AUT	FRA	NLD	NZL	NOR	SWE	SWI	UK	Certifications (sales thresholds)
1985	Whatever Happened to Jugula?: Artist: Roy Harper and Jimmy Page; Released: 1985; Label: Beggars Banquet, Science Friction; Format: CD	60	—	—	—	—	—	—	—	—	44	
1988	Outrider: Artist: Jimmy Page; Released: 19 June 1988; Label: Geffen; Format: CD	26	25	—	—	—	22	—	28	—	27	RIAA: Gold
1993	Coverdale–Page: Artist: Coverdale–Page; Released: 15 March 1993; Label: Geffen/EMI; Format: CD	5	25	—	—	55	—	11	8	16	4	RIAA: Platinum; MC: Platinum
1998	Walking into Clarksdale: Artist: Page and Plant; Released: 21 April 1998; Label: Atlantic/Mercury; Format: CD	8	16	33	5	56	11	13	17	31	3	RIAA: Gold
"—" denotes releases that did not chart or was not released.

=== Live albums ===
Year	Album details	Peak chart positions									Certifications (sales thresholds)
Year	Album details	US	AUS	AUT	FRA	NLD	NZL	SWE	SWI	UK	Certifications (sales thresholds)
1994	No Quarter: Artist: Page and Plant; Released: 7 November 1994; Label: Atlantic/Fontana; Format: CD	4	2	27	—	33	13	10	16	7	BPI: Gold; ARIA: Gold; ARIA: Platinum (DVD); MC: 2× Platinum; RIAA: Platinum
2000	Live at the Greek: Artist: Jimmy Page and The Black Crowes; Released: 29 February 2000; Label: TVT; Format: CD	64	—	37	73	46	45	—	77	—	RIAA: Gold
"—" denotes releases that did not chart or was not released.

=== Soundtrack albums ===
Year	Album details	Peak chart positions	
Year	Album details	US	UK
1982	Death Wish II: Artist: Jimmy Page; Released: 15 February 1982; Label: Swan Song; Format: LP	50	40
2012	Lucifer Rising and Other Sound Tracks: Artist: Jimmy Page; Released: 2012; Label: Format: LP	—	—
"—" denotes releases that did not chart or was not released.

== Singles ==
=== As lead artist ===
List of singles as lead artist, with selected chart positions
Title	Year	Peak chart positions			Album
Title	Year	UK	AUS	US Main.	Album
"She Just Satisfies" b/w "Keep Moving"	1965	—	—	—	Non-album single
"Wasting My Time"	1988	—	—	4	Outrider
"The Only One"	1988	—	—	13	Outrider
"Prison Blues"	1988	—	—	26	Outrider
"Pride and Joy" (with David Coverdale)	1993	—	89	1	Coverdale–Page
"Shake My Tree" (with David Coverdale)	1993	—	—	3	Coverdale–Page
"Take Me for a Little While" (with David Coverdale)	1993	29	—	15	Coverdale–Page
"Take a Look at Yourself" (with David Coverdale)	1993	49	—	—	Coverdale–Page
"Over Now" (with David Coverdale)	1993	—	—	24	Coverdale–Page
"Gallows Pole" (live) (with Robert Plant)	1994	35	46	2	No Quarter: Jimmy Page and Robert Plant Unledded
"Thank You" (live) (with Robert Plant)	1994	—	—	8	No Quarter: Jimmy Page and Robert Plant Unledded
"Wonderful One" (live) (with Robert Plant)	1995	—	—	—	No Quarter: Jimmy Page and Robert Plant Unledded
"Most High" (with Robert Plant)	1998	26	88	1	Walking into Clarksdale
"Shining in the Light" (with Robert Plant)	1998	—	—	6	Walking into Clarksdale
"What Is and What Should Never Be" (with the Black Crowes)	2000	—	—	13	Live at the Greek
"Ten Years Gone" (with the Black Crowes)	2000	—	—	33	Live at the Greek

=== As featured artist ===
List of singles as featured artist, with selected chart positions
Title	Year	Peak chart positions			Certifications	Album
Title	Year	UK	AUS	US	Certifications	Album
"Come with Me" (Puff Daddy featuring Jimmy Page)	1998	2	10	4	BPI: Silver; ARIA: Gold; RIAA: Platinum	Godzilla: The Album

== Other appearances ==
Year	Song	Album
1997	"Rude World" (with Robert Plant)	The Inner Flame – A Rainer Ptacek Tribute
2001	"My Bucket's Got a Hole in It" (with Robert Plant)	Good Rockin' Tonight – The Legacy of Sun Records

== Guest appearances ==
Year	Title	Footnotes
1964	"Heart of Stone" by The Rolling Stones, guitar, demo track issued on Metamorphosis	
1965	"I Can't Explain/"Bald Headed Woman" by The Who, rhythm guitar	
1966	Sunshine Superman by Donovan	
1969	With a Little Help from My Friends album by Joe Cocker, guitar on tracks 2, 4, 5, 7 & 9	
1975	Suicide Sal by Maggie Bell, guitar on tracks "If You Don't Know" and "Coming on Strong"	
1985	Scream for Help by John Paul Jones, guitar on tracks "Spaghetti Junction" and "Crackback"	
1986	"One Hit (To the Body)" by The Rolling Stones, guitar solo	
1988	"Heaven Knows" by Robert Plant, guitar solo	
1988	"Tall Cool One" by Robert Plant, guitar	
1998	"Come with Me" by Puff Daddy, "Kashmir" guitar riff	
1999	Blues Blues Blues by the Jimmy Rogers All Stars, guitar on "Gonna Shoot You Right Down (Boom Boom)" with Eric Clapton and Robert Plant	
2006	Last Man Standing by Jerry Lee Lewis, appears on "Rock and Roll"	
2008	Live at Wembley Stadium by Foo Fighters, appears on "Rock and Roll" and "Ramble On" with John Paul Jones	

== See also ==
- Robert Plant discography
- Led Zeppelin discography
