= Big Four (Grammy Awards) =

Awards that are unrestricted by genre

The Big Four Grammy Awards are four Grammy Awards presented by the National Academy of Recording Arts and Sciences which go to musical acts and works which are not restricted by genre or another criterion. The Big Four are part of the General Field, which encompasses six categories, including Producer of the Year (created 1975) and Songwriter of the Year (created 2023) which were both added in 2023; these latter two add categories are restricted only by not being of the Classical genre. Unlike the other Grammy Awards, the nomination and voting process within the General Field is open to all Academy voting members.

The most prestigious and important awards at the ceremony, the Big Four comprise:

- Album of the Year – awarded to the performer, songwriter(s), and the production team of a full album
- Record of the Year – awarded to the performer and the production team of a single song
- Song of the Year – awarded to the songwriter(s) of a single song
- Best New Artist – awarded to an artist without reference to a song or album

The first three categories are also known as the Big Three.

Only 2 artists have swept all 4 categories in a single year: Christopher Cross in 1981 for his self-titled album Christopher Cross and the single "Sailing" and Billie Eilish in 2020 for her album When We All Fall Asleep, Where Do We Go? and the single "Bad Guy". Adele and Jack Antonoff have won all 4, but in separate years.

== Artists and bands with multiple wins ==
Adele, Billie Eilish, Bruno Mars, and Paul Simon hold a four-way tie for most Big 4 wins, with seven each.

Eight artists have received the award more than once (either as a main-credit artist, duo or band; not counting wins solely as a producer, mixer or engineer).. Taylor Swift holds the record for Album of the Year with 4. Billie Eilish and Finneas O'Connell hold the record for Song of the Year with 3 wins. Bruno Mars and Paul Simon hold the record for most wins for Record of the Year with 3 each.

=== 2 ===
Artist/Band	Albums/Songs	Top Four
Domenico Modugno	"Nel Blu Dipinto Di Blu (Volare)" (1959)	Record, Song (1959)
Bobby Darin	"Mack the Knife", Best New Artist (1960)	Record, Best New Artist (1960)
Bob Newhart	The Button-Down Mind of Bob Newhart, Best New Artist (1961)	Album, Best New Artist (1961)
Tony Bennett	"I Left My Heart in San Francisco" (1963), MTV Unplugged (1995)	Record (1963), Album (1995)
Barbra Streisand	The Barbra Streisand Album (1964), "Evergreen (Love Theme from A Star Is Born)" (1978)	Album (1964), Song (1978)
Stan Getz	Getz/Gilberto, "The Girl from Ipanema" (1965)	Album, Record (1965)
The Beatles	Best New Artist (1965), Sgt. Pepper's Lonely Hearts Club Band (1968)	Best New Artist (1965), Album (1968)
The 5th Dimension	"Up, Up and Away" (1968), "Aquarius/Let the Sunshine In" (1970)	Record (1968, 1970)
Bob Dylan	The Concert for Bangladesh (1973), Time Out of Mind (1998)	Album (1973, 1998)
Roberta Flack	"The First Time Ever I Saw Your Face" (1973), "Killing Me Softly with His Song" (1974)	Record (1973, 1974)
Bette Midler	Best New Artist (1974), "Wind Beneath My Wings" (1990)	Record (1990), Best New Artist (1974)
Marvin Hamlisch	Best New Artist, "The Way We Were" (1975)	Best New Artist, Song (1975)
Michael McDonald	"What a Fool Believes" (with The Doobie Brothers (1980)	Record, Song (1980)
Toto	Toto IV, "Rosanna" (1983)	Album, Record (1983)
Lionel Richie	Can't Slow Down (1985), "We Are the World" (1986)	Album (1985), Song (1986)
Tina Turner	"What's Love Got to Do with It" (1985), River: The Joni Letters (with Herbie Hancock) (2008)	Record (1985), Album (2008)
Phil Collins	No Jacket Required (1986), "Another Day in Paradise" (1991)	Album (1986), Record (1991)
Rob Thomas	"Smooth" (2000)	Record, Song (2000)
Celine Dion	Falling Into You (1997), "My Heart Will Go On" (1999)	Album (1997), Record (1999)
Shawn Colvin	"Sunny Came Home" (1998)	Record, Song (1998)
Seal	"Kiss From A Rose" (1996)	Record, Song (1996)
Sheryl Crow	"All I Wanna Do", Best New Artist (1995)	Record, Best New Artist (1995)
Whitney Houston	The Bodyguard - Original Soundtrack Album, "I Will Always Love You" (1994)	Album, Record (1994)
Alicia Keys	"Fallin'", Best New Artist (2002)	Song, Best New Artist (2002)
Ray Charles	Genius Loves Company, "Here We Go Again" (2005)	Album, Record (2005)
Daft Punk	Random Access Memories, "Get Lucky" (2014)	Album, Record (2014)
fun.	"We Are Young" featuring Janelle Monáe, Best New Artist	Song, Best New Artist (2013)
Lady A	"Need You Now" (2011)	Record, Song (2011)
Robert Plant & Alison Krauss	Raising Sand, "Please Read the Letter" (2011)	Album, Record (2009)
Coldplay	"Clocks" (2004), "Viva La Vida" (2009)	Record (2004), Song (2009)
Bonnie Raitt	Nick of Time (1990), "Just Like That" (2023)	Album (1990), Song (2023)
Childish Gambino	"This Is America" (2019)	Record, Song (2019)
Beyoncé	"Single Ladies (Put a Ring on It)" (2010), Cowboy Carter (2025)	Song (2010), Album (2025)
Anderson .Paak	"Leave the Door Open" (2022)	Record, Song (2022)

=== 3 ===
Artist/Band	Albums/Songs	Top Four
Paul McCartney	Best New Artist (with The Beatles) (1965), "Michelle" (1967), Sgt. Pepper's Lonely Hearts Club Band (with The Beatles) (1968)	Best New Artist (1965), Song (1967), Album (1968)
George Harrison & Ringo Starr	Best New Artist (with The Beatles) (1965), Sgt. Pepper's Lonely Hearts Club Band (with The Beatles) (1968), The Concert for Bangladesh (1973)	Best New Artist (1965), Album (1968, 1973)
Simon & Garfunkel	"Mrs. Robinson" (1969), "Bridge over Troubled Water", Bridge over Troubled Water (1971)	Record (1969, 1971), Album (1971)
Carole King	"It's Too Late", Tapestry, "You've Got a Friend" (1972)	Record, Album, Song (1972)
Stevie Wonder	Innervisions (1974), Fulfillingness' First Finale (1975), Songs in the Key of Life (1977)	Album (1974, 1975, 1977)
Natalie Cole	Unforgettable... with Love, "Unforgettable" (1993), Best New Artist (1976)	Album, Record (1993), Best New Artist (1976)
Billy Joel	"Just the Way You Are", 52nd Street (1980)	Record, Song (1979), Album (1980)
Lauryn Hill	"The Miseducation of Lauryn Hill", Best New Artist (1999), Supernatural (2000)	Album (1999, 2000), Best New Artist
Santana & Rob Thomas	Supernatural, "Smooth" (2000)	Album, Record, Song (2000)
Amy Winehouse	"Rehab", Best New Artist (2008)	Record, Song, Best New Artist (2008)
The Chicks	Taking the Long Way, "Not Ready to Make Nice" (2007)	Album, Record, Song (2007)
Sam Smith	"Stay with Me", Best New Artist (2015)	Record, Song, Best New Artist (2015)
Kendrick Lamar	"Not Like Us" (2025), "Luther" (2026)	Record (2025, 2026), Song (2025)

=== 4 ===
Artist/Band	Albums/Songs	Top Four
Frank Sinatra	Come Dance with Me! (1960), September of My Years (1966), A Man and His Music (1967), "Strangers in the Night" (1967)	Album (1960, 1966, 1967), Record (1967)
John Lennon	Best New Artist (with The Beatles (1965), "Michelle" (1967), Sgt. Pepper's Lonely Hearts Club Band (with The Beatles) (1968), Double Fantasy (with Yoko Ono (1982)	Best New Artist (1965), Song (1967), Album (1968, 1982)
Christopher Cross	Christopher Cross, "Sailing", Best New Artist (1981)	Album, Record, Song, Best New Artist (1981)
Michael Jackson	Thriller, "Beat It" (1984), "We Are the World" (1986)	Album (1984), Record (1984, 1986), Song (1986)
Quincy Jones	Thriller, "Beat It" (1984), "We Are the World" (1986), Back on the Block (1991)	Album (1984, 1991), Record (1984, 1986)
Taylor Swift	Fearless (2008), 1989 (2014), Folklore (2020), Midnights (2024)	Album (2008, 2014, 2020, 2024)

=== 5 ===
Artist/Band	Albums/Songs	Top Four
Henry Mancini	"The Music from Peter Gunn" (1959), "Moon River" (1962), "Days of Wine and Roses" (1964)	Album (1959) Record, Song (1962, 1964)
Eric Clapton	The Concert for Bangladesh (1973), Unplugged, "Tears in Heaven" (1993), "Change the World" (1997)	Album (1973, 1993), Record (1993, 1997), Song (1993)
Norah Jones	Come Away with Me, "Don't Know Why", Best New Artist (2003), "Here We Go Again" (2005), River: The Joni Letters (2008)	Album (2003, 2008) Record (2003, 2005), Best New Artist (2003)

=== 6 ===
Artist/Band	Albums/Songs	Top Four
U2	The Joshua Tree (1988), "Beautiful Day" (2001), "Walk On" (2002), How to Dismantle an Atomic Bomb, "Sometimes You Can't Make It on Your Own" (2006)	Album (1988, 2006), Record (2001, 2002), Song (2001, 2006)
Finneas O'Connell	When We All Fall Asleep, Where Do We Go?, "Bad Guy" (2020), "Everything I Wanted" (2021), "What Was I Made For?" (2024), "Wildflower" (2026)	Album (2020), Record (2020, 2021), Song (2020, 2024, 2026)
Jack Antonoff	"We Are Young", Best New Artist (2013), 1989 (2016), Folklore (2021), Midnights (2024), "Luther" (2026)	Album (2016, 2021, 2024), Song (2013), Best New Artist (2013), Record (2026)

=== 7 ===
Artist/Band	Albums/Songs	Top Four
Paul Simon	"Mrs. Robinson" (with Simon & Garfunkel (1969), Bridge over Troubled Water with Simon & Garfunkel, "Bridge over Troubled Water" with Simon & Garfunkel (1971), Still Crazy After All These Years (1976), Graceland (1987), "Graceland" (1988)	Record (1969, 1971, 1988), Album (1971, 1976, 1987), Song (1971)
Adele	Best New Artist (2009), 21, "Rolling in the Deep" (2012), 25, "Hello" (2017)	Album (2012, 2017), Record (2012, 2017), Song (2012, 2017), Best New Artist (2009)
Bruno Mars	"Uptown Funk" (2016), 25 (2017) 24K Magic, "24K Magic", "That's What I Like" (2018), "Leave the Door Open" (2022)	Album (2017, 2018), Record (2016, 2018, 2022), Song (2018, 2022)
Billie Eilish	When We All Fall Asleep, Where Do We Go?, "Bad Guy", Best New Artist (2020), "Everything I Wanted" (2021), "What Was I Made For?" (2024), Wildflower (2026)	Album (2020), Record (2020, 2021), Song (2020, 2024, 2026), Best New Artist (2020)

== Recipients ==
=== 1950s ===
Year^{[I]}	Award	Work	Artist(s)/Song Writers
1959	Album	The Music from Peter Gunn	Henry Mancini
1959	Record	"Nel Blu Dipinto Di Blu (Volare)"	Domenico Modugno
1959	Song	"Nel Blu Dipinto Di Blu (Volare)"	Domenico Modugno

=== 1960s ===
Year^{[I]}	Award	Work	Artist(s)	Production Team/Song Writers
1960	Album	Come Dance with Me!	Frank Sinatra	
1960	Record	"Mack the Knife"	Bobby Darin	
1960	Song	"The Battle of New Orleans"	Johnny Horton	Jimmy Driftwood
1960	Best New Artist	Bobby Darin		
1961	Album	The Button-Down Mind of Bob Newhart	Bob Newhart	
1961	Record	"Theme from A Summer Place"	Percy Faith	
1961	Song	"Theme of Exodus"	Instrumental (Various Artists)	Ernest Gold
1961	Best New Artist	Bob Newhart		
1962	Album	Judy at Carnegie Hall	Judy Garland	
1962	Record	"Moon River"	Henry Mancini	
1962	Song	"Moon River"	Henry Mancini	Henry Mancini; Johnny Mercer
1962	Best New Artist	Peter Nero		
1963	Album	The First Family	Vaughn Meader	Bob Booker & Earle Doud, producers
1963	Record	"I Left My Heart in San Francisco"	Tony Bennett	
1963	Song	"What Kind of Fool Am I?"	Sammy Davis Jr.	Leslie Bricusse; Anthony Newley
1963	Best New Artist	Robert Goulet		
1964	Album	The Barbra Streisand Album	Barbra Streisand	
1964	Record	"Days of Wine and Roses"	Henry Mancini	
1964	Song	"Days of Wine and Roses" *	Henry Mancini	Henry Mancini; Johnny Mercer
1964	Best New Artist	The Swingle Singers		
1965	Album	Getz/Gilberto	Stan Getz & João Gilberto	
1965	Record	"The Girl from Ipanema"	Stan Getz & Astrud Gilberto	
1965	Song	"Hello, Dolly!"	Louis Armstrong	Jerry Herman
1965	Best New Artist	The Beatles		
1966	Album	September of My Years	Frank Sinatra	Sonny Burke, producer
1966	Record	"A Taste of Honey"	Herb Alpert & the Tijuana Brass	Herb Alpert & Jerry Moss, producers
1966	Song	"The Shadow of Your Smile"	Tony Bennett	Paul Francis Webster; Johnny Mandel
1966	Best New Artist	Tom Jones		
1967	Album	A Man and His Music	Frank Sinatra	Sonny Burke, producer
1967	Record	"Strangers in the Night"	Frank Sinatra	Jimmy Bowen, producer
1967	Song	"Michelle"	The Beatles	John Lennon; Paul McCartney
1967	Best New Artist	No Award		
1968	Album	Sgt. Pepper's Lonely Hearts Club Band	The Beatles	George Martin, producer
1968	Record	"Up, Up and Away"	The 5th Dimension	Marc Gordon & Johnny Rivers, producers
1968	Song	"Up, Up, and Away" *	The 5th Dimension	Jimmy Webb
1968	Best New Artist	Bobbie Gentry		
1969	Album	By the Time I Get to Phoenix	Glen Campbell	Al De Lory, producer
1969	Record	"Mrs. Robinson"	Simon & Garfunkel	Roy Halee & Simon & Garfunkel, producers
1969	Song	"Little Green Apples"	O. C. Smith	Bobby Russell
1969	Best New Artist	José Feliciano		

=== 1970s ===
Year^{[I]}	Award	Work	Artist(s)	Production Team/Song Writers
1970	Album	Blood, Sweat & Tears	Blood, Sweat & Tears	James William Guercio, producer
1970	Record	"Aquarius/Let the Sunshine In"	The 5th Dimension	Bones Howe, producer
1970	Song	"Games People Play"	Joe South	Joe South
1970	Best New Artist	Crosby, Stills & Nash		
1971	Album	Bridge over Troubled Water	Simon & Garfunkel	Roy Halee & Simon & Garfunkel, producers
1971	Record	"Bridge over Troubled Water"	Simon & Garfunkel	Roy Halee & Simon & Garfunkel, producers
1971	Song	"Bridge over Troubled Water"	Simon & Garfunkel	Paul Simon
1971	Best New Artist	The Carpenters		
1972	Album	Tapestry	Carole King	Lou Adler, producer
1972	Record	"It's Too Late"	Carole King	Lou Adler, producer
1972	Song	"You've Got a Friend"	James Taylor & Carole King	Carole King
1972	Best New Artist	Carly Simon		
1973	Album	The Concert for Bangla Desh	George Harrison & Friends (Ravi Shankar, Bob Dylan, Leon Russell, Ringo Starr, Billy Preston, Eric Clapton & Klaus Voormann)	George Harrison & Phil Spector, producers
1973	Record	"The First Time Ever I Saw Your Face"	Roberta Flack	Joel Dorn, producer
1973	Song	"The First Time Ever I Saw Your Face"	Roberta Flack	Ewan MacColl
1973	Best New Artist	America		
1974	Album	Innervisions	Stevie Wonder	Stevie Wonder, producer
1974	Record	"Killing Me Softly with His Song"	Roberta Flack	Joel Dorn, producer
1974	Song	"Killing Me Softly with His Song"	Roberta Flack	Norman Gimbel; Charles Fox
1974	Best New Artist	Bette Midler		
1975	Album	Fulfillingness' First Finale	Stevie Wonder	Stevie Wonder, producer
1975	Record	"I Honestly Love You"	Olivia Newton-John	John Farrar, producer
1975	Song	"The Way We Were"	Barbra Streisand	Alan and Marilyn Bergman; Marvin Hamlisch
1975	Best New Artist	Marvin Hamlisch		
1976	Album	Still Crazy After All These Years	Paul Simon	Paul Simon & Phil Ramone, producers
1976	Record	"Love Will Keep Us Together"	Captain & Tennille	Daryl Dragon, producer
1976	Song	"Send in the Clowns"	Judy Collins	Stephen Sondheim
1976	Best New Artist	Natalie Cole		
1977	Album	Songs in the Key of Life	Stevie Wonder	Stevie Wonder, producer
1977	Record	"This Masquerade"	George Benson	Tommy LiPuma, producer
1977	Song	"I Write the Songs"	Barry Manilow	Bruce Johnston
1977	Best New Artist	Starland Vocal Band		
1978	Album	Rumours	Fleetwood Mac	Fleetwood Mac, Ken Caillat & Richard Dashut, producers
1978	Record	"Hotel California"	Eagles	Bill Szymczyk, producer
1978	Song	"You Light Up My Life" "Evergreen (Love Theme from A Star Is Born)"	Debby Boone Barbra Streisand	Joe Brooks Barbra Streisand Paul Williams
1978	Best New Artist	Debby Boone		
1979	Album	Saturday Night Fever - Soundtrack^{[A]}	Various Artists	Albhy Galuten, Arif Mardin, Bee Gees, Bill Oakes, Bobby Martin, Broadway Eddie, David Shire, Freddie Perren, Harry Wayne Casey, K.G. Productions, Karl Richardson, Ralph MacDonald, Richard Finch, Ron Kersey, Thomas J. Valentino & William Salter, producers
1979	Record	"Just the Way You Are"	Billy Joel	Phil Ramone, producer
1979	Song	"Just the Way You Are"	Billy Joel	Billy Joel
1979	Best New Artist	A Taste of Honey		

=== 1980s ===
Year^{[I]}	Award	Work	Artist(s)	Production Team/Song Writers
1980	Album	52nd Street	Billy Joel	Phil Ramone, producer
1980	Record	"What a Fool Believes"	The Doobie Brothers	Ted Templeman, producer
1980	Song	"What a Fool Believes"	The Doobie Brothers	Kenny Loggins; Michael McDonald
1980	Best New Artist	Rickie Lee Jones		
1981	Album	Christopher Cross	Christopher Cross	Michael Omartian, producer
1981	Record	"Sailing"	Christopher Cross	Michael Omartian, producer
1981	Song	"Sailing"	Christopher Cross	Christopher Cross
1981	Best New Artist	Christopher Cross		
1982	Album	Double Fantasy	John Lennon & Yoko Ono	Jack Douglas, John Lennon & Yoko Ono, producers
1982	Record	"Bette Davis Eyes"	Kim Carnes	Val Garay, producer
1982	Song	"Bette Davis Eyes"	Kim Carnes	Donna Weiss; Jackie DeShannon
1982	Best New Artist	Sheena Easton		
1983	Album	Toto IV	Toto	Toto, producers
1983	Record	"Rosanna"	Toto	Toto, producers
1983	Song	"Always on My Mind"	Willie Nelson	Johnny Christopher; Mark James; Wayne Carson
1983	Best New Artist	Men at Work		
1984	Album	Thriller	Michael Jackson	Michael Jackson & Quincy Jones, producers
1984	Record	"Beat It"	Michael Jackson	Michael Jackson & Quincy Jones, producers
1984	Song	"Every Breath You Take"	The Police	Sting
1984	Best New Artist	Culture Club		
1985	Album	Can't Slow Down	Lionel Richie	James Anthony Carmichael & Lionel Richie, producers
1985	Record	"What's Love Got to Do with It"	Tina Turner	Terry Britten, producer
1985	Song	"What's Love Got to Do with It"	Tina Turner	Graham Lyle; Terry Britten
1985	Best New Artist	Cyndi Lauper		
1986	Album	No Jacket Required	Phil Collins	Hugh Padgham & Phil Collins, producers
1986	Record	"We Are the World"	USA for Africa	Quincy Jones, producer
1986	Song	"We Are the World"	USA for Africa	Michael Jackson; Lionel Richie
1986	Best New Artist	Sade		
1987	Album	Graceland	Paul Simon	Paul Simon, producer
1987	Record	"Higher Love"	Steve Winwood	Russ Titelman & Steve Winwood, producers
1987	Song	"That's What Friends Are For"	Dionne Warwick & Friends (Elton John, Gladys Knight & Stevie Wonder)	Burt Bacharach; Carole Bayer Sager
1987	Best New Artist	Bruce Hornsby & The Range		
1988	Album	The Joshua Tree	U2	Brian Eno & Daniel Lanois, producers
1988	Record	"Graceland"	Paul Simon	Paul Simon, producer
1988	Song	"Somewhere Out There"	Linda Ronstadt & James Ingram	James Horner; Barry Mann; Cynthia Weil
1988	Best New Artist	Jody Watley		
1989	Album	Faith	George Michael	George Michael, producer
1989	Record	"Don't Worry, Be Happy"	Bobby McFerrin	Linda Goldstein, producer
1989	Song	"Don't Worry, Be Happy"	Bobby McFerrin	Bobby McFerrin
1989	Best New Artist	Tracy Chapman		

=== 1990s ===
Year^{[I]}	Award	Work	Artist(s)	Production Team/Song Writers
1990	Album	Nick of Time	Bonnie Raitt	Don Was, producer
1990	Record	"Wind Beneath My Wings"	Bette Midler	Arif Mardin, producer
1990	Song	"Wind Beneath My Wings"	Bette Midler	Larry Henley; Jeff Silbar
1990	Best New Artist	~~Milli Vanilli~~ (rescinded)		
1991	Album	Back on the Block	Quincy Jones & Various Artists	Quincy Jones, producer
1991	Record	"Another Day in Paradise"	Phil Collins	Hugh Padgham & Phil Collins, producers
1991	Song	"From a Distance"	Bette Midler	Julie Gold
1991	Best New Artist	Mariah Carey		
1992	Album	Unforgettable... with Love	Natalie Cole	Andre Fischer, David Foster & Tommy LiPuma, producers
1992	Record	"Unforgettable"	Natalie Cole (With Nat King Cole)	David Foster, producer
1992	Song	"Unforgettable" *	Natalie Cole (With Nat King Cole)	Irving Gordon
1992	Best New Artist	Marc Cohn		
1993	Album	Unplugged	Eric Clapton	Russ Titelman, producer
1993	Record	"Tears in Heaven"	Eric Clapton	Russ Titelman, producer
1993	Song	"Tears in Heaven"	Eric Clapton	Eric Clapton; Will Jennings
1993	Best New Artist	Arrested Development		
1994	Album	The Bodyguard - Original Soundtrack Album ^{[B]}	Whitney Houston	David Foster, Narada Michael Walden, L.A. Reid, Babyface & BeBe Winans, producers
1994	Record	"I Will Always Love You"	Whitney Houston	David Foster, producer
1994	Song	"A Whole New World"	Peabo Bryson & Regina Belle	Alan Menken; Tim Rice
1994	Best New Artist	Toni Braxton		
1995	Album	MTV Unplugged	Tony Bennett	David Kahne, producer
1995	Record	"All I Wanna Do"	Sheryl Crow	Bill Bottrell, producer
1995	Song	"Streets of Philadelphia"	Bruce Springsteen	Bruce Springsteen
1995	Best New Artist	Sheryl Crow		
1996	Album	Jagged Little Pill	Alanis Morissette	Glen Ballard, producer
1996	Record	"Kiss from a Rose"	Seal	Trevor Horn, producer
1996	Song	"Kiss from a Rose"	Seal	Seal
1996	Best New Artist	Hootie & the Blowfish		
1997	Album	Falling into You	Celine Dion	Roy Bittan, Jeff Bova, David Foster, Humberto Gatica, Jean-Jacques Goldman, Rick Hahn, Dan Hill, John Jones, Aldo Nova, Rick Nowels, Steven Rinkoff, Billy Steinberg, Jim Steinman & Ric Wake, producers
1997	Record	"Change the World"	Eric Clapton	Babyface, producer
1997	Song	"Change the World"	Eric Clapton	Gordon Kennedy; Wayne Kirkpatrick; Tommy Sims
1997	Best New Artist	LeAnn Rimes		
1998	Album	Time Out of Mind	Bob Dylan	Daniel Lanois, producer
1998	Record	"Sunny Came Home"	Shawn Colvin	John Leventhal, producer
1998	Song	"Sunny Came Home"	Shawn Colvin	Shawn Colvin; John Leventhal
1998	Best New Artist	Paula Cole		
1999	Album	The Miseducation of Lauryn Hill	Lauryn Hill	Lauryn Hill, producer; Commissioner Gordon, Matt Howe, Storm Jefferson, Ken Johnston, Tony Prendatt, Warren Riker, Chris Theis & Johnny Wyndrx, engineers/mixers
1999	Record	"My Heart Will Go On"	Celine Dion	Walter Afanasieff, Simon Franglen & James Horner, producers; Simon Franglen, Humberto Gatica & David Gleeson, engineers/mixers
1999	Song	"My Heart Will Go On"	Celine Dion	James Horner; Will Jennings
1999	Best New Artist	Lauryn Hill		

=== 2000s ===
Year^{[I]}	Award	Work	Artist(s)	Production Team/Song Writers
2000	Album	Supernatural	Santana	Clive Davis, Jerry Duplessis, Dust Brothers, Alex González, Charles Goodan, Stephen M. Harris, Lauryn Hill, Art Hodge, Wyclef Jean, Fher Olvera, K. C. Porter, Dante Ross & Matt Serletic, producers; Mike Couzzi, Benny Faccone, Steve Farrone, Steve Fontano, David Frazer, Jim Gaines, John Gamble, Commissioner Gordon, Andy Grassi, John Karpowich, Glenn Kolotkin, Tom Lord-Alge, Jeff Poe, Tony Prendatt, Anton Pukshansky, Warren Riker, Jim Scott, John Seymour, Matty Spindel, T-Ray, Chris Theis, David Thoener & Alvaro Villagra, engineers/mixers
2000	Record	"Smooth"	Santana featuring Rob Thomas	Matt Serletic, producer; David Thoener, engineer/mixer
2000	Song	"Smooth" *	Santana featuring Rob Thomas	Itaal Shur; Rob Thomas
2000	Best New Artist	Christina Aguilera		
2001	Album	Two Against Nature	Steely Dan	Walter Becker & Donald Fagen, producers; Phil Burnett, Roger Nichols, Dave Russell & Elliot Scheiner, engineers/mixers
2001	Record	"Beautiful Day"	U2	Brian Eno & Daniel Lanois, producers; Steve Lillywhite & Richard Rainey, engineer/mixers
2001	Song	"Beautiful Day"	U2	Adam Clayton; David Evans; Larry Mullen Jr. Paul Hewson
2001	Best New Artist	Shelby Lynne		
2002	Album	O Brother, Where Art Thou? - Soundtrack ^{[C]}	Various Artists	T Bone Burnett, producer; Mike Piersante & Peter Kurland, engineer/mixers; Gavin Lurssen, mastering engineer
2002	Record	"Walk On"	U2	Brian Eno & Daniel Lanois, producers; Steve Lillywhite & Richard Rainey, engineer/mixers
2002	Song	"Fallin'"	Alicia Keys	Alicia Keys
2002	Best New Artist	Alicia Keys		
2003	Album	Come Away with Me	Norah Jones	Norah Jones, Arif Mardin, Jay Newland & Craig Street, producers; S. Husky Huskolds & Jay Newland, engineers/mixers; Ted Jensen, mastering engineer
2003	Record	"Don't Know Why"	Norah Jones	Norah Jones, Arif Mardin & Jay Newland, producers; Arif Mardin & Jay Newland, engineers/mixers
2003	Song	"Don't Know Why"	Norah Jones (recipient: Jesse Harris)	Jesse Harris
2003	Best New Artist	Norah Jones		
2004	Album	Speakerboxxx/The Love Below	OutKast	André 3000 & Antwon "Big Boi" Patton, producers; Vincent Alexander, Chris Carmouche, Kevin "KD" Davis, Reggie Dozier, John Frye, Robert Hannon, Padraic Kernin, Moka Nagatani, Pete Novak, Brian Paturalski, Neal Pogue, Dexter Simmons, Matt Still & Darrell Thorp, engineers/mixers; Brian Gardner & Bernie Grundman, mastering engineers
2004	Record	"Clocks"	Coldplay	Coldplay & Ken Nelson, producers; Coldplay, Ken Nelson & Mark Phythian, engineers/mixers
2004	Song	"Dance with My Father"	Luther Vandross	Richard Marx; Luther Vandross
2004	Best New Artist	Evanescence		
2005	Album	Genius Loves Company	Ray Charles & Various Artists	John Burk, Terry Howard, Don Mizell, Phil Ramone & Herbert Waltl, producers; Robert Fernandez, John Harris, Terry Howard, Pete Karam, Joel Moss, Al Schmitt & Ed Thacker, engineers/mixers; Robert Hadley & Doug Sax, mastering engineers
2005	Record	"Here We Go Again"	Ray Charles & Norah Jones	John Burk, producer; Mark Fleming, Terry Howard & Al Schmitt, engineers/mixers
2005	Song	"Daughters"	John Mayer	John Mayer
2005	Best New Artist	Maroon 5		
2006	Album	How to Dismantle an Atomic Bomb	U2	Brian Eno, Flood, Daniel Lanois, Jacknife Lee, Steve Lillywhite & Chris Thomas, producers; Greg Collins, Flood, Carl Glanville, Simon Gogerly, Nellee Hooper, Jacknife Lee & Steve Lillywhite, engineers/mixers; Arnie Acosta, mastering engineer
2006	Record	"Boulevard of Broken Dreams"	Green Day	Rob Cavallo & Green Day, producers; Chris Lord-Alge & Doug McKean, engineers/mixers
2006	Song	"Sometimes You Can't Make It on Your Own"	U2	Adam Clayton; David Evans; Larry Mullen Jr. Paul Hewson
2006	Best New Artist	John Legend		
2007	Album	Taking the Long Way	Dixie Chicks	Rick Rubin, producer; Richard Dodd, Jim Scott & Chris Testa, engineers/mixers; Richard Dodd, mastering engineer
2007	Record	"Not Ready to Make Nice"	Dixie Chicks	Rick Rubin, producer; Richard Dodd, Jim Scott & Chris Testa, engineers/mixers
2007	Song	"Not Ready to Make Nice"	Dixie Chicks	Emily Robison; Martie Maguire; Natalie Maines; Dan Wilson
2007	Best New Artist	Carrie Underwood		
2008	Album	River: The Joni Letters	Herbie Hancock	Leonard Cohen, Norah Jones, Joni Mitchell, Corinne Bailey Rae, Luciana Souza & Tina Turner, featured artists; Herbie Hancock & Larry Klein, producers; Helik Hadar, engineer/mixer; Bernie Grundman, mastering engineer
2008	Record	"Rehab"	Amy Winehouse	Mark Ronson, producer; Tom Elmhirst, Mark Ronson, Dom Morley, Vaughan Merrick & Gabriel Roth, engineers/mixers
2008	Song	"Rehab"	Amy Winehouse	Amy Winehouse
2008	Best New Artist	Amy Winehouse		
2009	Album	Raising Sand	Robert Plant & Alison Krauss	T Bone Burnett, producer; Mike Piersante, engineer/mixer; Gavin Lurssen, mastering engineer
2009	Record	"Please Read the Letter"	Robert Plant & Alison Krauss	T Bone Burnett, producer; Mike Piersante, engineer/mixe
2009	Song	"Viva la Vida"	Coldplay	Guy Berryman; Jonny Buckland; Will Champion; Chris Martin
2009	Best New Artist	Adele		

=== 2010s ===
Year^{[I]}	Award	Work	Artist(s)	Production Team/Song Writers
2010	Album	Fearless	Taylor Swift	Colbie Caillat, featured artist; Nathan Chapman & Taylor Swift, producers; Chad Carlson, Nathan Chapman & Justin Niebank, engineers/mixers; Hank Williams, mastering engineer
2010	Record	"Use Somebody"	Kings of Leon	Jacquire King & Angelo Petraglia, producers; Jacquire King, engineer/mixer
2010	Song	"Single Ladies (Put a Ring on It)"	Beyoncé	Thaddis Harrell; Beyoncé Knowles; Terius Nash; Christopher Stewart
2010	Best New Artist	Zac Brown Band		
2011	Album	The Suburbs	Arcade Fire	Arcade Fire & Markus Dravs, producers; Arcade Fire, Mark Lawson & Craig Silvey, engineers/mixers; Mark Lawson, mastering engineer
2011	Record	"Need You Now"	Lady Antebellum	Lady Antebellum & Paul Worley, producers; Clarke Schleicher, engineer/mixer
2011	Song	"Need You Now"	Lady Antebellum	Dave Haywood; Josh Kear; Charles Kelley; Hillary Scott
2011	Best New Artist	Esperanza Spalding		
2012	Album	21	Adele	Jim Abbiss, Adele Adkins, Paul Epworth, Rick Rubin, Fraser T Smith, Ryan Tedder & Dan Wilson, producers; Jim Abbiss, Philip Allen, Beatriz Artola, Ian Dowling, Tom Elmhirst, Greg Fidelman, Dan Parry, Steve Price, Mark Rankin, Andrew Scheps, Fraser T. Smith & Ryan Tedder, engineers/mixers; Tom Coyne, mastering engineer
2012	Record	"Rolling in the Deep"	Adele	Paul Epworth, producer; Tom Elmhirst & Mark Rankin, engineers/mixers
2012	Song	"Rolling in the Deep"	Adele	Adele Adkins; Paul Epworth
2012	Best New Artist	Bon Iver		
2013	Album	Babel	Mumford & Sons	Markus Dravs, producer; Robin Baynton & Ruadhri Cushnan, engineers/mixers; Bob Ludwig, mastering engineer
2013	Record	"Somebody That I Used to Know"	Gotye featuring Kimbra	Wally de Backer, producer; Wally de Backer & François Tétaz, engineers/mixers; William Bowden, mastering engineer
2013	Song	"We Are Young"	Fun featuring Janelle Monáe	Nate Ruess; Jack Antonoff; Jeff Bhasker; Andrew Dost
2013	Best New Artist	Fun		
2014	Album	Random Access Memories	Daft Punk	Julian Casablancas, DJ Falcon, Todd Edwards, Chilly Gonzales, Giorgio Moroder, Panda Bear, Nile Rodgers, Paul Williams & Pharrell Williams, featured artists; Thomas Bangalter, Julian Casablancas, Guy-Manuel De Homem-Christo, DJ Falcon & Todd Edwards, producers; Peter Franco, Mick Guzauski, Florian Lagatta, Guillaume Le Braz & Daniel Lerner, engineers/mixers; Bob Ludwig, mastering engineer
2014	Record	"Get Lucky"	Daft Punk featuring Pharrell Williams & Nile Rodgers	Thomas Bangalter & Guy-Manuel de Homem-Christo, producers; Peter Franco, Mick Guzauski, Florian Lagatta & Daniel Lerner, engineers/mixers; Antoine Chabert & Bob Ludwig, mastering engineer
2014	Song	"Royals"	Lorde	Joel Little; Ella Yelich-O'Connor
2014	Best New Artist	Macklemore & Ryan Lewis		
2015	Album	Morning Phase	Beck	Beck Hansen, producer; Tom Elmhirst, David Greenbaum, Florian Lagatta, Cole Marsden Greif-Neill, Robbie Nelson, Darrell Thorp, Cassidy Turbin & Joe Visciano, engineers/mixers; Bob Ludwig, mastering engineer
2015	Record	"Stay with Me (Darkchild Version)"	Sam Smith	Steve Fitzmaurice, Rodney Jerkins & Jimmy Napes, producers; Steve Fitzmaurice, Jimmy Napes & Steve Price, engineers/mixers; Tom Coyne, mastering engineer
2015	Song	"Stay with Me"	Sam Smith	James Napier; William Phillips; Sam Smith
2015	Best New Artist	Sam Smith		
2016	Album	1989	Taylor Swift	Jack Antonoff, Nathan Chapman, Imogen Heap, Max Martin, Mattman & Robin, Ali Payami, Shellback, Taylor Swift, Ryan Tedder & Noel Zancanella, producers; Jack Antonoff, Mattias Bylund, Smith Carlson, Nathan Chapman, Serban Ghenea, John Hanes, Imogen Heap, Sam Holland, Michael Ilbert, Brendan Morawski, Laura Sisk & Ryan Tedder, engineers/mixers; Tom Coyne, mastering engineer
2016	Record	"Uptown Funk"	Mark Ronson featuring Bruno Mars	Jeff Bhasker, Bruno Mars & Mark Ronson, producers; Josh Blair, Serban Ghenea, Wayne Gordon, John Hanes, Inaam Haq, Boo Mitchell, Charles Moniz & Mark Ronson, engineers/mixers; Tom Coyne, mastering engineer
2016	Song	"Thinking Out Loud"	Ed Sheeran	Ed Sheeran; Amy Wadge
2016	Best New Artist	Meghan Trainor		
2017	Album	25	Adele	Danger Mouse, Samuel Dixon, Paul Epworth, Greg Kurstin, Max Martin, Ariel Rechtshaid, Shellback, The Smeezingtons & Ryan Tedder, producers; Julian Burg, Austen Jux Chandler, Cameron Craig, Samuel Dixon, Tom Elmhirst, Declan Gaffney, Serban Ghenea, John Hanes, Jan Holzner, Michael Ilbert, Chris Kasych, Greg Kurstin, Charles Moniz, Liam Nolan, Alex Pasco, Mike Piersante, Ariel Rechtshaid, Rich Rich, Dave Schiffman & Matt Wiggins, engineers/mixers; Tom Coyne & Randy Merrill, mastering engineers
2017	Record	"Hello"	Adele	Greg Kurstin, producer; Julian Burg, Tom Elmhirst, Greg Kurstin, Liam Nolan & Alex Pasco, engineers/mixers; Tom Coyne & Randy Merrill, mastering engineers
2017	Song	"Hello"	Adele	Adele Adkins; Greg Kurstin
2017	Best New Artist	Chance the Rapper		
2018	Album	24K Magic	Bruno Mars	Shampoo Press & Curl, producers; Serban Ghenea, John Hanes & Charles Moniz, engineers/mixers; Christopher Brody Brown, James Fauntleroy, Philip Lawrence & Bruno Mars, songwriters; Tom Coyne, mastering engineer
2018	Record	"24K Magic"	Bruno Mars	Shampoo Press & Curl, producers; Serban Ghenea, John Hanes & Charles Moniz, engineers/mixers; Tom Coyne, mastering engineer
2018	Song	"That's What I Like"	Bruno Mars	Christopher Brody Brown; James Fauntleroy; Philip Lawrence; Bruno Mars; Ray Charles McCullough II; Jeremy Reeves; Ray Romulus; Jonathan Yip
2018	Best New Artist	Alessia Cara		
2019	Album	Golden Hour	Kacey Musgraves	Ian Fitchuk, Kacey Musgraves & Daniel Tashian, producers; Craig Alvin & Shawn Everett, engineers/mixers; Ian Fitchuk, Kacey Musgraves & Daniel Tashian, songwriters; Greg Calbi & Steve Fallone, mastering engineers
2019	Record	"This Is America"	Childish Gambino	Donald Glover & Ludwig Göransson, producers; Derek "MixedByAli" Ali, Kesha Lee, Riley Mackin, Shaan Singh & Alex Tumay, engineers/mixers; Mike Bozzi, mastering engineer
2019	Song	"This Is America"	Childish Gambino	Donald Glover; Ludwig Göransson; Jeffery Lamar Williams
2019	Best New Artist	Dua Lipa		

=== 2020s ===
Year^{[I]}	Award	Work	Artist(s)	Production Team/Song Writers
2020	Album	When We All Fall Asleep, Where Do We Go?	Billie Eilish	Finneas O'Connell, producer; Rob Kinelski & Finneas O'Connell, engineers/mixers; Billie Eilish O'Connell & Finneas O'Connell, songwriters; John Greenham, mastering engineer
2020	Record	"Bad Guy"	Billie Eilish	Finneas O'Connell, producer; Rob Kinelski & Finneas O'Connell, engineers/mixers; John Greenham, mastering engineer
2020	Song	"Bad Guy"	Billie Eilish	Billie Eilish O'Connell; Finneas O'Connell
2020	Best New Artist	Billie Eilish		
2021	Album	Folklore	Taylor Swift	Jack Antonoff, Aaron Dessner & Taylor Swift, producers; Jack Antonoff, Aaron Dessner, Serban Ghenea, John Hanes, Jonathan Low & Laura Sisk, engineers/mixers; Aaron Dessner & Taylor Swift, songwriters; Randy Merrill, mastering engineer
2021	Record	"Everything I Wanted"	Billie Eilish	Finneas O'Connell, producer; Rob Kinelski & Finneas O'Connell, engineers/mixers; John Greenham, mastering engineer
2021	Song	"I Can't Breathe"	H.E.R	D'Mile, H.E.R. & Tiara Thomas
2021	Best New Artist	Megan Thee Stallion		
2022	Album	We Are	Jon Batiste	Craig Adams, David Gauthier, Braedon Gautier, Brennon Gautier, Gospel Soul Children Choir, Hot 8 Brass Band, PJ Morton, Autumn Rowe, Zadie Smith, St. Augustine High School Marching 100 and Trombone Shorty, featured artists; Jon Batiste, Mikey Freedom Hart, King Garbage, Kizzo, Sunny Levine, Nate Mercereau, David Pimentel, Ricky Reed, Autumn Rowe, Jahaan Sweet and Nick Waterhouse, producers; Batiste, Russ Elevado, Mischa Kachkachishvili, Kizzo, Joseph Lorge, Manny Marroquin, Pimentel, Reed, Jaclyn Sanchez, Matt Vertere, Marc Whitmore and Alex Williams, engineers/mixers; Andrae Alexander, Troy Andrews, Batiste, Zach Cooper, Vic Dimotsis, Eric Frederic, Kizzo, Levine, Steve McEwan, Morton, Rowe and Mavis Staples, songwriters; Emerson Mancini, mastering engineer
2022	Record	"Leave the Door Open"	Silk Sonic	Dernst "D'Mile" Emile II and Bruno Mars, producers; Serban Ghenea, John Hanes and Charles Moniz, engineers/mixers; Randy Merrill, mastering engineer
2022	Song	"Leave the Door Open"	Silk Sonic	Brandon Anderson, Christopher Brody Brown, Dernst Emile II and Bruno Mars
2022	Best New Artist	Olivia Rodrigo		
2023	Album	Harry's House	Harry Styles	Tyler Johnson, Kid Harpoon and Sammy Witte, producers; Jeremy Hatcher, Oli Jacobs, Nick Lobel, Spike Stent and Sammy Witte, engineers/mixers; Amy Allen, Tobias Jesso Jr., Tyler Johnson, Kid Harpoon, Mitch Rowland, Harry Styles and Sammy Witte, songwriters; Randy Merrill, mastering engineer
2023	Record	"About Damn Time"	Lizzo	Ricky Reed and Blake Slatkin, producers; Patrick Kehrier, Bill Malina and Manny Marroquin, engineers/mixers; Emerson Mancini, mastering engineer
2023	Song	"Just Like That"	Bonnie Raitt	
2023	Best New Artist	Samara Joy		
2024	Album	Midnights	Taylor Swift	Jack Antonoff & Taylor Swift, producers; Jack Antonoff, Zem Audu, Serban Ghenea, David Hart, Mikey Freedom Hart, Sean Hutchinson, Ken Lewis, Michael Riddleberger, Laura Sisk & Evan Smith, engineers/mixers; Jack Antonoff & Taylor Swift, songwriters; Randy Merrill, mastering engineer
2024	Record	"Flowers"	Miley Cyrus	Kid Harpoon & Tyler Johnson, producers; Michael Pollack, Brian Rajaratnam & Mark "Spike" Stent, engineers/mixers; Joe LaPorta, mastering engineer
2024	Song	"What Was I Made For?"	Billie Eilish	Billie Eilish O'Connell; Finneas O'Connell
2024	Best New Artist	Victoria Monet		
2025	Album	Cowboy Carter	Beyoncé	Beyoncé, Terius "The-Dream" Gesteelde-Diamant & Dave Hamelin, producers; Matheus Braz, Brandon Harding, Hotae Alexander Jang, Dani Pampuri & Stuart White, engineers/mixers; Ryan Beatty, Beyoncé, Camaron Ochs, Terius "The-Dream" Gesteelde-Diamant, Dave Hamelin, S. Carter & Raphael Saadiq, songwriters; Colin Leonard, mastering engineer
2025	Record	"Not Like Us"	Kendrick Lamar	Sean Momberger, Mustard & Sounwave, producers; Ray Charles Brown Jr. & Johnathan Turner, engineers/mixers; Nicolas de Porcel, mastering engineer
2025	Song	"Not Like Us"	Kendrick Lamar	Kendrick Lamar
2025	Best New Artist	Chappell Roan		
2026	Album	Debí Tirar Más Fotos	Bad Bunny	Big Jay, La Paciencia, Mag & Tainy, producers; Antonio Caraballo, Josh Gudwin, Luis Amed Irizarry & Roberto José Rosado Torres, engineers/mixers; Benito Antonio Martínez Ocasio, Roberto José Rosado Torres, Marco Daniel Borrero, Jay Anthony Nuñez & Marco Efrain Masis, songwriters; Colin Leonard, mastering engineer
2026	Record	"Luther"	Kendrick Lamar & SZA	Jack Antonoff, Scott Bridgeway, M-Tech, Roselilah, Sounwave & Kamasi Washington, producers; Jack Antonoff, Ray Charles Brown Jr., Hector Castro, Oli Jacobs, Jack Manning, Sean Matsukawa, Dani Perez, Tony Shepperd, Laura Sisk & Johnathan Turner, engineers/mixers; Ruairi O'Flaherty, mastering engineer
2026	Song	"Wildflower"	Billie Eilish	Billie Eilish O'Connell & Finneas O'Connell, songwriters
2026	Best New Artist	Olivia Dean		

== See also ==
- List of Grammy Award categories
