= Shining in the Light (song) =

1998 song by Jimmy Page and Robert Plant

Single by Jimmy Page & Robert Plant

from the album Walking into Clarksdale
- Released: 30 May 1998
- Studio: RAK Studios (London, England)
- Genre: Hard rock
- Length: 4:01
- Label: Mercury; Atlantic (North America)
- Songwriters: Jimmy Page; Robert Plant; Charlie Jones; Michael Lee
- Producers: Jimmy Page; Robert Plant

Jimmy Page & Robert Plant singles chronology
"Most High" (1998)	"Shining in the Light" (1998)

"Shining in the Light" is a song by Jimmy Page and Robert Plant from their 1998 studio album Walking into Clarksdale. Issued as the album's second single on 30 May 1998, the song reached No. 6 on the US Billboard Mainstream Rock chart.

The track contains an overdubbed string section performed by Page on the Mellotron. Added as a guide, the overdub was inadvertently left in for the album release.

== Track listings ==
UK release
No.	Title	Writer(s)	Length
1.	"Shining in the Light"	Page, Plant, Jones, Lee	4:01
2.	"How Many More Times (Live At Shepherds Bush Empire)"	Page, John Paul Jones, John Bonham	11:18

European release
No.	Title	Writer(s)	Length
1.	"Shining in the Light"	Page, Plant, Jones, Lee	4:01
2.	"Walking Into Clarksdale (Live at the Shepherds Bush Empire)"	Page, Plant, Jones, Lee	11:18
3.	"No Quarter (Live at the Shepherds Bush Empire)"	Page, Plant, John Paul Jones	9:48

US release
No.	Title	Writer(s)	Length
1.	"Shining in the Light"	Page, Plant, Jones, Lee	4:01

Japanese release
No.	Title	Writer(s)	Length
1.	"Shining in the Light"	Page, Plant, Jones, Lee	4:01
2.	"How Many More Times (Live At Shepherds Bush Empire)"	Page, John Paul Jones, Bonham	11:18
3.	"Walking Into Clarksdale (Live at the Shepherds Bush Empire)"	Page, Plant, Jones, Lee	6:17
4.	"No Quarter (Live at the Shepherds Bush Empire)"	Page, Plant, John Paul Jones	9:48
