= Raising Sand =

2007 studio album by Robert Plant and Alison Krauss

Studio album by Robert Plant and Alison Krauss
- Released: October 23, 2007
- Studio: Sound Emporium (Nashville, Tennessee); Electro Magnetic; Village Recorder (Los Angeles, California); Stage & Sound (Hollywood, California)
- Genre: Americana; folk; country
- Length: 57:13
- Label: Rounder, Zoë
- Producer: T Bone Burnett

Robert Plant and Alison Krauss chronology
Raising Sand (2007)	Raise the Roof (2021)

Robert Plant chronology
Nine Lives (2006)	Raising Sand (2007)	Band of Joy (2010)

Alison Krauss chronology
Lonely Runs Both Ways (2004)	Raising Sand (2007)	Essential Alison Krauss (2009)

Singles from Raising Sand
- 1. "Gone Gone Gone (Done Moved On)" Released: 2007; 2. "Please Read the Letter" Released: 2008; 3. "Rich Woman" Released: 2008

Raising Sand is the first collaborative studio album by rock singer Robert Plant and bluegrass-country singer Alison Krauss. It was released in October 2007 by Rounder Records. Raising Sand won Album of the Year at the 2008 Americana Music Honors & Awards and at the 2009 Grammy Awards.

== Reception ==
Professional ratings
Aggregate scores
Source	Rating
Metacritic	87/100
Review scores
Source	Rating
AllMusic	4/5 stars
The A.V. Club	B+
Blender	4/5 stars
Entertainment Weekly	A−
Mojo	5/5 stars
Now	3/5 stars
The Observer	4/5 stars
Paste	4/5 stars
Rolling Stone	3.5/5 stars
Uncut	5/5 stars

The album met with critical acclaim, earning an average score of 87 from reviews compiled by Metacritic. It ranked at No. 24 on Rolling Stone's December 17, 2007 listing of the year's top 50 albums. Being There called it "one of the year’s very best". AllMusic hailed it "one of the most effortless-sounding pairings in modern popular music", but stated that some songs "(felt) like (they were) tossed off". JamBase called the album "subtle, focused and full of life" and said that it was "highly recommended". Village Voice described it as "powerfully evocative" and "utterly foreign, oddly familiar, and deeply gratifying."

The songs on Raising Sand were handpicked by producer T Bone Burnett. Entertainment Weekly described the selection as "eclectic", while Village Voice said, "Burnett flaunts his typical curatorial genius with a whole set of 'have we met before?' tunes."

The musical quality was also praised. The BBC described Krauss's fiddle as "coruscating" and "raw", while The Music Box said Krauss "exceeds all expectations". The BBC said the musicians "make this a stunning, dark, brooding collection, comparable in tone to Daniel Lanois's masterful job on Dylan's Time Out of Mind."

Critics praised Krauss and Plant's vocals; one critic saying that the "key to the magic is the delicious harmony vocals of the unlikely duo". Various critics described Krauss's vocals as "spellbinding", "honey-sweet", "weepy", "saccharine", and "haunting". Plant's vocals were described as "orgasmic" and "slithering".

"Gone, Gone, Gone (Done Moved On)" was released as a single and won the Best Pop Collaboration with Vocals at the 50th Grammy Awards and was nominated for the Americana Award for "Song of the Year". The song "Killing the Blues" was No. 51 on Rolling Stone's list of the 100 Best Songs of 2007.

On February 8, 2009, the album won all five awards for which it was nominated at the 51st Grammy Awards: Album of the Year; Best Contemporary Folk/Americana Album; Record of the Year (for "Please Read the Letter"); Best Pop Collaboration with Vocals (for "Rich Woman"); and Best Country Collaboration with Vocals (for "Killing the Blues"). Raising Sand was the second of four country albums to win Album of the Year, following Dixie Chicks's Taking the Long Way and preceding Taylor Swift's Fearless and Kacey Musgraves' Golden Hour.

The album was nominated for the 2008 Mercury Prize in the UK.

In December 2009, Rhapsody ranked the album No. 2 on its "Country’s Best Albums of the Decade" list. The online music service also called it one of their favorite cover albums of all time.

"Raising Sand is my album of the century," said singer Lily Allen. "I love the whole folky and bluegrass sound. There's one track called 'Sister Rosetta Goes Before Us', which sounds like an epic funeral march: it's haunting and spooky, and Alison Krauss's voice can just make you shiver. Then there's 'Please Read the Letter', which just has such an honest and open sentiment, it's disarming. I'd love to do an album like that."

== Chart performance ==
The album debuted at number two on the Billboard 200, selling about 112,000 copies in its first week, the highest chart position for either artists' solo work, although Plant had previously reached No. 1 several times with Led Zeppelin. Raising Sand was certified platinum by the RIAA on March 4, 2008. After the album's success at the 2009 Grammy Awards, the album topped the Billboard Top Rock Albums chart and Top Internet Albums chart for the first time on the week of February 28, 2009. The album also hit the top of Canadian Top Country Albums, and also peaked at No. 2 in Billboard Top Country Albums, being stuck behind part of 35 weeks non-consecutive chart topping Fearless by country singer Taylor Swift. Selling 77,000 copies on a 715% increase, Raising Sand jumped 69–2 on the Billboard 200.

The album entered the Top 5 on the UK Albums Chart, going on to reach No. 2 on January 2, 2008.

== Follow-up album ==
According to Ken Irwin of Rounder Records, and producer Burnett, the duo started work on a second album in 2009.

"To be 61 and faced with the 'difficult second album' is quite a phenomenon…" Plant observed in 2009. "We'd finished everything in ten days in Nashville, and I rented a car and went down the Natchez Trace to Oxford, Mississippi, across to Clarksdale and down into Helena, Arkansas, looking for those ghosts… and thought to myself, 'How can this be? I've just been with complete strangers, recorded 12 amazing tracks, had a fantastic time, and now I'm headed for the Mississippi Delta.'"

In a 2010 interview, Plant indicated that the follow-up sessions were unsuccessful. However, Krauss and Plant eventually released a new album produced by Burnett, Raise the Roof, on November 19, 2021.

== Track listing ==
No.	Title	Writer(s)	Length
1.	"Rich Woman"	Dorothy LaBostrie, McKinley Millet	4:04
2.	"Killing the Blues"	Roly Jon Salley	4:16
3.	"Sister Rosetta Goes Before Us"	Sam Phillips	3:26
4.	"Polly Come Home"	Gene Clark	5:36
5.	"Gone Gone Gone (Done Moved On)"	The Everly Brothers	3:33
6.	"Through the Morning, Through the Night"	Gene Clark	4:01
7.	"Please Read the Letter"	Jimmy Page, Charlie Jones, Michael Lee, Robert Plant	5:53
8.	"Trampled Rose"	Kathleen Brennan, Tom Waits	5:34
9.	"Fortune Teller"	Allen Toussaint	4:30
10.	"Stick With Me Baby"	Mel Tillis	2:50
11.	"Nothin'"	Townes Van Zandt	5:33
12.	"Let Your Loss Be Your Lesson"	Milton Campbell	4:02
13.	"Your Long Journey"	Doc Watson, Rosa Lee Watson	3:55

== Personnel ==
"Please Read The Letter"
Robert Plant and Alison Krauss' "Please Read the Letter" from Raising Sand

- Alison Krauss – vocals (1–10, 12, 13), fiddle (3, 7, 11)
- Robert Plant – vocals (1, 2, 4–7, 9–11, 13)
- Patrick Warren – keyboards (8), pump organ (8), toy piano (8)
- T Bone Burnett – electric guitars (1, 2, 5, 6, 9, 10), acoustic guitars (2, 3, 7, 11), 6-string guitar (2), 6-string bass (5, 12)
- Marc Ribot – electric guitars (1–4, 6, 7, 9–12), banjo (3), acoustic guitars (4, 7), dobro (8)
- Norman Blake – acoustic guitars (11, 13)
- Greg Leisz – pedal steel guitar (2, 6)
- Riley Baugus – banjo (13)
- Dennis Crouch – acoustic bass
- Jay Bellerose – drums
- Mike Seeger – autoharp (13)

Production

- T Bone Burnett – producer
- Mike Piersante – recording, mixing
- Stacy Parrish – additional engineer
- Jason Wormer – additional engineer, editing
- Kyle Ford – assistant engineer
- Emile Kelman – assistant engineer
- Vanessa Parr – assistant engineer
- Alex Pavlides – assistant engineer
- Gavin Lurssen – mastering at Lurssen Mastering (Los Angeles, California)
- Paul Ackling – guitar technician
- Curtis Laur – guitar technician
- Ivy Skoff – production manager
- Lisa Surber – production managing assistant
- Nicola Powell – project coordinator for Robert Plant
- Pamela Springsteen – photography
- Russ Harrington – band photography
- Steve Jurgensmeyer – art direction, design

== Charts ==
=== Weekly charts ===
Chart (2007–2009)	Peak position
Australian Albums (ARIA)	45
Austrian Albums (Ö3 Austria)	31
Belgian Albums (Ultratop Flanders)	48
Belgian Albums (Ultratop Wallonia)	59
Canadian Albums (Billboard)	5
Czech Albums (ČNS IFPI)	42
Danish Albums (Hitlisten)	22
Dutch Albums (Album Top 100)	26
Finnish Albums (Suomen virallinen lista)	23
French Albums (SNEP)	49
German Albums (Offizielle Top 100)	28
Irish Albums (IRMA)	9
Italian Albums (FIMI)	41
New Zealand Albums (RMNZ)	3
Norwegian Albums (VG-lista)	1
Scottish Albums (Official Charts)	2
Spanish Albums (Promusicae)	74
Swedish Albums (Sverigetopplistan)	2
Swiss Albums (Schweizer Hitparade)	33
UK Albums (Official Charts)	2
US Billboard 200	2
US Top Country Albums (Billboard)	2
US Top Rock Albums (Billboard)	1

Chart (2016)	Peak position
Czech Albums (ČNS IFPI)	26

=== Year-end charts ===
Chart (2007)	Position
Swedish Albums (Sverigetopplistan)	19
UK Albums (OCC)	73
US Top Country Albums (Billboard)	42

Chart (2008)	Position
New Zealand Albums (RMNZ)	40
Swedish Albums (Sverigetopplistan)	61
UK Albums (OCC)	34
US Billboard 200	39
US Top Country Albums (Billboard)	8
US Top Rock Albums (Billboard)	11

Chart (2009)	Position
UK Albums (OCC)	176
US Billboard 200	131
US Top Country Albums (Billboard)	28
US Top Rock Albums (Billboard)	40

== Certifications ==
Region	Certification	Certified units/sales
Canada (Music Canada)	Platinum	100,000^{^}
Ireland (IRMA)	Platinum	15,000^{^}
New Zealand (RMNZ)	Platinum	15,000^{^}
Russia (NFPF)	Gold	10,000^{*}
Sweden (GLF)	Platinum	40,000^{^}
United Kingdom (BPI)	2× Platinum	600,000^{*}
United States (RIAA)	Platinum	1,000,000^{^}
Summaries
Europe (IFPI)	Platinum	1,000,000^{*}
^{*} Sales figures based on certification alone.^{^} Shipments figures based on certification alone.
