= Please Read the Letter =

1998 song by Jimmy Page and Robert Plant

Song by Jimmy Page and Robert Plant

from the album Walking Into Clarksdale
- Recorded: 1998
- Genre: Folk rock
- Length: 4:21
- Label: Atlantic (US), Mercury (international)
- Songwriters: Charlie Jones, Michael Lee, Jimmy Page, Robert Plant
- Producers: Jimmy Page, Robert Plant

"Please Read the Letter" is a song originally written and recorded by Jimmy Page and Robert Plant (as Page and Plant) for their only studio album Walking into Clarksdale (1998).

Plant and Alison Krauss later recorded a version of the song for their collaboration album Raising Sand released in October 2007. The song was well received by critics, and won the Record of the Year award at the 2009 Grammy Awards.

== Music and lyrics ==
"Please Read the Letter" is in the folk rock genre.

Plant explained that "Please Read the Letter" is a song about yearning for someone, adding that the lyrics are about "unfinished business".

== Release ==
A music video for the single was released in 2008. It was shot in a 1905-built house in South Los Angeles. The music video was nominated for Wide Open Country Video of the Year at the 2009 CMT Music Awards.

== Robert Plant and Alison Krauss version ==
"Please Read the Letter"

Single by Robert Plant and Alison Krauss

from the album Raising Sand
- Released: 2008
- Recorded: 2007
- Genre: Folk rock, country
- Length: 5:55
- Label: Rounder
- Songwriters: Charlie Jones, Michael Lee, Jimmy Page, Robert Plant

Music video
- "Please Read the Letter" at CMT.com

Robert Plant singles chronology
"Gone, Gone, Gone (Done Moved On)" (2007)	"Please Read the Letter" (2008)	"Rich Woman" (2008)

Alison Krauss singles chronology
"Gone, Gone, Gone (Done Moved On)" (2007)	"Please Read the Letter" (2008)	"Rich Woman" (2008)

"Please Read The Letter"
Robert Plant and Alison Krauss' "Please Read The Letter" from Raising Sand

=== Chart performance ===
Plant and Krauss's version of the song initially failed to chart, but after winning the Grammy Award for Record of the Year, the song entered the Billboard Bubbling Under Hot 100 chart at #20 (the virtual equivalent to #120 on the Hot 100) in 2009.

Chart (2009)	Peak position
UK Singles Chart	102
U.S. Billboard Bubbling Under Hot 100	20

== Reception ==
The song has been well received by critics. Chris Jones, in his review for the BBC, felt that the version by Plant and Krauss is "completely improved" from the original track. Thom Jurek wrote for Allmusic: "Slow, plodding, almost crawling, Krauss's harmony vocal takes it to the next step, adds the kind of lonesome depth that makes this a song whispered under a starless sky rather than just another lost love song."

== Track listing ==
2008 US CD single (Rounder RPAK102-R1)

1. "Please Read the Letter" (Radio Edit) (Jones, Lee, Page, Plant) – 3:47
2. "Please Read the Letter" (Jones, Lee, Page, Plant) – 5:55
