= Walking into Clarksdale =

Studio album by Page and Plant
- Released: 20 April 1998
- Recorded: August–September 1997
- Studios: Abbey Road, London, England
- Genres: Blues rock, hard rock
- Length: 60:43
- Labels: Atlantic (US/Canada); Mercury (international)
- Producers: Jimmy Page and Robert Plant

Page and Plant chronology
No Quarter: Jimmy Page and Robert Plant Unledded (1994)	Walking into Clarksdale (1998)

Jimmy Page chronology
No Quarter: Jimmy Page and Robert Plant Unledded (1994)	Walking into Clarksdale (1998)	Live at the Greek: Excess All Areas (2000)

Robert Plant chronology
No Quarter: Jimmy Page and Robert Plant Unledded (1994)	Walking into Clarksdale (1998)	Dreamland (2002)

Professional ratings
Review scores
Source	Rating
AllMusic	3.5/5 stars
Robert Christgau	(dud)
Collector's Guide to Heavy Metal	10/10
Entertainment Weekly	91/100
NME	6/10
The Rolling Stone Album Guide	3.5/5 stars
Spin	3/10
Uncut	7/10

Walking into Clarksdale is the only studio album by the English rock band Page and Plant, released by Atlantic Records on 20 April 1998. The album was recorded and mixed by Steve Albini at Abbey Road Studios.

The album debuted on Billboard's Billboard 200 album chart at No. 8, while reaching No. 3 on the UK Albums Chart. The single "Most High" was awarded a Grammy Award for Best Hard Rock Performance in 1999, and reached No. 1 on Billboard's Mainstream Rock Tracks chart and No. 26 in the UK.

Plant re-recorded the song "Please Read the Letter" with Alison Krauss for their 2007 collaboration album Raising Sand. This re-recording won the Record of the Year award at the 2009 Grammy Awards. "House of Love" was later re-recorded with different lyrics by Robert Plant and the Sensational Space Shifters for their 2014 studio album Lullaby and the Ceaseless Roar.

The title of the album refers to Clarksdale, Mississippi, a town in the Mississippi Delta considered to be the birthplace of blues music.

== Background and recording ==
Following their successful No Quarter tour and live album release, Jimmy Page and Robert Plant began writing Walking into Clarksdale. For the new record, Page and Plant pursued a more stripped-down sound, eschewing the heavy orchestration of their live performances in favor of a more traditional four-piece band. The initial demos for the album were written by Page on a Harmony H1260 Sovereign guitar, first used during the recording of Led Zeppelin III.

The band met at RAK Studios in August 1997 where they recorded "Burning Up" and "Shining in the Light". Shortly after, the band left RAK for Abbey Road's EMI Number Two Studio, where they recorded the rest of the album over the course of 35 days in August and September. Page characterized the band's approach as "minimalistic", stating that the band wanted to avoid "embellishments for the sake of it" and that "every note was played in its place to mean something."

The album was recorded and mixed by Steve Albini, known for producing Nirvana's final album In Utero. Plant reported he had long admired Albini's music and recording techniques. Each song was recorded in a single take, with the full band live in the studio, with the exception of guitar layering on the title track and string and keyboard overdubs on "Upon a Golden Horse" and "Most High".

== Release ==
Walking Into Clarksdale was released internationally on 20 April 1998 and in North America on 21 April to widespread critical acclaim. The album received significant promotion from Atlantic Records, which mounted an extensive marketing campaign. This included advertising on major U.S. cable channels, placements in prominent national print outlets such as Rolling Stone, and numerous interviews on major talk shows. A "substantial radio buy" in the top 20 radio markets further bolstered its visibility.

In a novel move, Atlantic Records partnered with Ticketmaster to promote the album directly to fans purchasing tickets for the 1998 tour—a first for the label. These efforts contributed to strong sales, earning the album gold certification in the United States.

The album’s lead single, "Most High," was released on 30 March 1998. It debuted at No. 10 on Billboard's Mainstream Rock chart and quickly climbed to No. 1. A second single, "Shining in the Light," followed on 30 May 1998.

The album's cover, designed by Martin Callomon, features photography by Anton Corbijn, renowned for his work with U2 and Depeche Mode. Walking Into Clarksdale was later named 1998 Album of the Year by Entertainment Weekly.

== Tour ==
To promote Walking into Clarksdale, Page and Plant kicked off 1998's "Walking into Everywhere" Tour. The tour, consisting of three tours of Eastern Europe, North America, and Western Europe, consisted of 97 tour dates and featured a mix of both new material and Led Zeppelin classics. The band's concert in Bucharest, Romania was professionally filmed for a cancelled home video release, and parts of the concert were broadcast live on the MTV special “Live from the 10 Spot” to promote the album.

Three additional tour legs in Japan, Australia, and South America were planned for 1999. However, following a final appearance in Paris on 10 December 1998 at the Amnesty International “The Struggle Continues…” concert, Robert Plant dissolved the partnership and the planned 1999 tour was cancelled.

== Track listing ==
All songs by Jimmy Page, Robert Plant, Charlie Jones, and Michael Lee.

1. "Shining in the Light" – 4:01
2. "When the World Was Young" – 6:13
3. "Upon a Golden Horse" – 3:52
4. "Blue Train" – 6:45
5. "Please Read the Letter" – 4:21
6. "Most High" – 5:36
7. "Heart in Your Hand" – 3:50
8. "Walking into Clarksdale" – 5:18
9. "Burning Up" – 5:21
10. "When I Was a Child" – 5:45
11. "House of Love" – 5:35
12. "Sons of Freedom" – 4:08

Japanese bonus track

13. "Whiskey from the Glass" – 3:01

Note

- "Most High" and "Shining in the Light" were released as singles, with a music video for the former. "Most High" was also featured as a CD single with the B-side "The Window".

== Personnel ==
Band members

- Jimmy Page – acoustic and electric guitars, mandolin, co-production
- Robert Plant – vocals, co-production
- Charlie Jones – bass guitar, percussion, mixing on "Upon a Golden Horse"
- Michael Lee – drums, percussion

Additional musicians

- Lynton Naiff – string arrangements on "Upon a Golden Horse"
- Ed Shearmur – programming and string pads on "Most High"
- Tim Whelan – keyboards on "Most High"

Production

- Steve Albini – engineering, mixing, recording technician
- Paul Hicks – assistant engineering
- Phil Andrews – mixing on "Upon a Golden Horse"
- Anton Corbijn – photography
- Martin "Cally" Callomon – design

== Charts ==
=== Weekly charts ===
Weekly chart performance for Walking into Clarksdale
Chart (1998)	Peak position
Australian Albums (ARIA)	16
Austrian Albums (Ö3 Austria)	33
Belgian Albums (Ultratop Flanders)	27
Belgian Albums (Ultratop Wallonia)	22
Canada Top Albums/CDs (RPM)	17
Dutch Albums (Album Top 100)	56
French Albums (SNEP)	5
Finnish Albums (Suomen virallinen lista)	27
German Albums (Offizielle Top 100)	13
Hungarian Albums (MAHASZ)	25
New Zealand Albums (RMNZ)	11
Norwegian Albums (VG-lista)	13
Swedish Albums (Sverigetopplistan)	17
Swiss Albums (Schweizer Hitparade)	31
UK Albums (Official Charts)	3
US Billboard 200	8

=== Year-end ===
Year-end chart performance for Walking into Clarksdale
Chart (1998)	Position
Canada Top Albums/CDs (RPM)	100

== Certifications ==
Certifications for Walking into Clarksdale
Region	Certification	Certified units/sales
United Kingdom (BPI)	Silver	60,000^{^}
United States (RIAA)	Gold	500,000^{^}
^{^} Shipments figures based on certification alone.
