= Still Crazy (soundtrack album) =

Soundtrack album by Various artists
- Released: 1998
- Label: London Records 90 Ltd.

Still Crazy is the soundtrack album from the 1998 music-comedy film, Still Crazy. The fictional band from the film perform some of their songs on the album.

Chris Difford of Squeeze fame won an Ivor Novello award for his lyrics.

== Track listing ==
1. "The Flame Still Burns" - Strange Fruit with Jimmy Nail - (Jones / Frederiksen / Difford)
2. "All over the World" - Strange Fruit - (Jones / Frederiksen / Difford)
3. "What Might Have Been" - Jimmy Nail - (Ballard / Difford)
4. "Brian's Theme" (Acoustic) - Steve Donnelly - (C. Langer)
5. "Dirty Town" - Strange Fruit - (Lynne / La Frenais)
6. "Stealin'" - Billy Connolly - (Arr. Connolly)
7. "Black Moon" - Strange Fruit - (Pratt / Vyse / Difford)
8. "Live for Today" - Hans Matheson - (C. Langer)
9. "Bird on a Wire" - Strange Fruit with Jimmy Nail - (Jones / Frederiksen / Difford)
10. "Ibiza Theme" - 22.33.44 - (C. Langer)
11. "Scream Freedom" - Strange Fruit - (Jones / Frederiksen / Difford)
12. "A Woman Like That" - Bernie Marsden - (Lynne / Vela / La Frenais)
13. "Dangerous Things" - Strange Fruit - (Langer / Difford)
14. "Brian's Theme" (Reprise) - Steve Donnelly - (C. Langer)

== Strange Fruit ==
The band "Strange Fruit" on this record consists of:

- Bill Nighy (lead and backing vocals)
- Jimmy Nail (lead and backing vocals)
- Steve Donnelly (guitar)
- Morgan Nicholls (organ, except on 1)
- Guy Pratt (bass, except on 1)
- Michael Lee (drums, tambourine)

- On track 1, Steve Nieve plays keyboards and Charlie Jones plays bass.

- Clive Langer plays additional guitar on 2
- Paul Carrack plays additional Hammond organ on 5
- Steve Nieve plays additional Hammond organ on 7
- Alan Dunn plays accordion and Bob Loveday plays mandolin and violin on 11
- Simon Hale plays piano on 13.

== Chart performance ==
Chart (1998)	Peak position
UK Compilation Albums (OCC)	82
