= Most High (song) =

1998 song by Jimmy Page and Robert Plant

Single by Jimmy Page and Robert Plant

from the album Walking into Clarksdale
- B-side: "The Window"; "Upon a Golden Horse"
- Released: 30 March 1998
- Studio: Abbey Road (London, England)
- Genre: Hard rock
- Length: 5:36
- Label: Mercury
- Songwriters: Jimmy Page; Robert Plant; Charlie Jones; Michael Lee
- Producers: Jimmy Page; Robert Plant

Jimmy Page and Robert Plant singles chronology
"Gallows Pole" (1994)	"Most High" (1998)	"Shining in the Light" (1998)

"Most High" is a song by the English rock duo Jimmy Page and Robert Plant from their only studio album, Walking into Clarksdale (1998). The song features a keyboard overdub by Tim Whelan of Transglobal Underground, played in a quarter-tone to mimic Moroccan trance.

== Release and reception ==
Issued as a single in the United Kingdom and the United States on 30 March 1998, "Most High" reached No. 1 on the US Billboard Mainstream Rock chart, No. 26 on the UK singles chart, and No. 88 on the Australian Singles Chart. In 1999, the song won Page and Plant the Grammy Award for Best Hard Rock Performance.

B-side "The Window" was one of two known original songs from the sessions to not make the album, the other being "Whiskey from the Glass", included as a bonus on some editions of the album.

== Music video ==
The music video for "Most High" was directed by Italian-Canadian photographer and director Floria Sigismondi. It was included as a bonus feature on the DVD release of No Quarter: Jimmy Page and Robert Plant Unledded. The video, featuring visual references to the religious themes of the song's lyrics, depicts Jimmy Page and Robert Plant as prisoners in a numbered cell block, with other cells holding a series of mutated creatures practicing dark magic.

== Track listings ==
All tracks are written by Jimmy Page, Robert Plant, Charlie Jones, and Michael Lee except where noted.

UK, Australasian, and Japanese CD single
No.	Title	Writer(s)	Length
1.	"Most High"		4:25
2.	"Upon a Golden Horse"		3:57
3.	"The Window"	Page; Plant; Jones; Lee; Phil Andrews	6:05

UK 7-inch single and European CD single
No.	Title	Writer(s)	Length
1.	"Most High"		4:25
2.	"The Window"	Page; Plant; Jones; Lee; Andrews	6:05

== Credits and personnel ==
Credits are adapted from the Walking into Clarksdale album booklet.

Studio

- Recorded, mixed, and mastered at Abbey Road Studios (London, England)

Personnel

- Jimmy Page – writing, guitar, production
- Robert Plant – writing, vocals, production
- Charlie Jones – writing, bass
- Michael Lee – writing, drums
- Ed Shearmur – string pad, programming
- Tim Whelan – Oriental keyboard
- Steve Albini – recording, mixing
- Paul Hicks – studio assistant

== Charts ==
=== Weekly charts ===
Chart (1998)	Peak position
Australia (ARIA)	88
Canada Top Singles (RPM)	58
Canada Rock/Alternative (RPM)	8
Europe (Eurochart Hot 100)	87
Scottish Singles Sales (Official Charts)	19
UK Singles (Official Charts)	26
US Mainstream Rock (Billboard)	1

=== Year-end charts ===
Chart (1998)	Position
US Mainstream Rock Tracks (Billboard)	29

== Release history ==
Region	Date	Format(s)	Label(s)	Ref.
United Kingdom	30 March 1998	7-inch vinyl; CD	Mercury	
United States	30 March 1998	Radio	Atlantic	
Japan	29 April 1998	CD	Mercury	
