= Led Zeppelin discography =

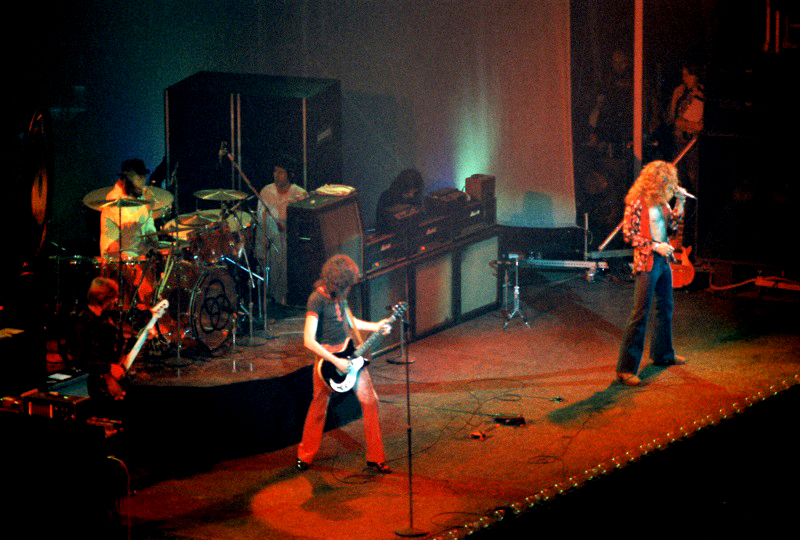
- Led Zeppelin performing live at Chicago Stadium in 1975
- Studio albums: 9
- Extended plays: 1
- Live albums: 4
- Compilation albums: 10
- Singles: 19
- Video albums: 4
- Music videos: 16
- Charted songs: 3
- Music downloads: 9

The discography of the English rock band Led Zeppelin consists of 9 studio albums, 4 live albums, 10 compilation albums, 19 singles, 16 music videos and 9 music downloads. The band is estimated to have sold over 300 million records worldwide, becoming one of the best-selling music artists in history. According to Billboard, they are the 40th Greatest Artist of All Time, as well as the 11th Most Successful Artist on the Billboard 200 history. The band has scored 7 number-one albums on Billboard 200 and has sold 112.5 million certified albums in the United States, becoming the 5th best-selling album artist in RIAA history.

Formed in London in 1968, the group consisted of singer Robert Plant, guitarist Jimmy Page, bassist John Paul Jones, and drummer John Bonham. The band pioneered the concept of album-oriented rock and often refused to release popular songs as singles. Their debut album, Led Zeppelin (1969), released by Atlantic Records, charted at number six on the UK Albums Chart and at number ten on the United States Billboard 200. It received several sales certifications, including an eight-times multi-platinum from the Recording Industry Association of America (RIAA) and a Diamond from the Music Canada. Led Zeppelin's second studio album, Led Zeppelin II, recorded when the band were on tour, was released a few months after the first. It reached number one in several countries, including the UK and the US, where it was certified 12 times multi-platinum. The album produced Led Zeppelin's highest-charting single, "Whole Lotta Love", which peaked at several music charts in the top 10. Led Zeppelin III (1970) was a softer, more folk-based effort compared to the hard rock of the band's previous releases. It also peaked at number one in the UK and in the US.

Led Zeppelin's untitled fourth album, often called Led Zeppelin IV and released on 8 November 1971, is their most commercially successful album. It received a 24 times multi-platinum certification from RIAA, the fifth-highest of all albums, and fourth-highest exclusive of greatest hits compilations. The band's fifth album, Houses of the Holy, was released in 1973. Again a transatlantic chart-topper, it has received an 11 times multi-platinum certification from RIAA. In 1974, the band set up their own vanity label, Swan Song Records, which would release the rest of Led Zeppelin's studio albums. The first was the 1975 double album Physical Graffiti, which has received a 16 times platinum certification from RIAA. Zeppelin's seventh album, Presence (1976), achieved a triple Platinum certification from RIAA. On 20 October 1976, Led Zeppelin released their first concert film The Song Remains the Same. The recording of the film took place during three nights of concerts at Madison Square Garden in New York City, during the band's 1973 concert tour of the United States. The band's eighth studio album, In Through the Out Door, received a sextuple platinum certification. This was the last album released by the band before Bonham died of alcohol poisoning in 1980; Led Zeppelin disbanded less than three months later.

In 1982, Led Zeppelin released their last studio album, Coda, which contained outtakes from the band's previous recordings. Since their break-up, the band have released numerous compilation and live albums from older concerts, including How the West Was Won, which peaked at number one on the Billboard charts, and the compilation album Mothership, which was released on the same day Led Zeppelin's entire catalog became available in digital stores, including in the iTunes Store. "Stairway to Heaven", which had never been released as an official single before, was one of these songs released in digital stores.

== Albums ==
=== Studio albums ===
List of studio albums, with selected chart positions and certifications
| Title | Album details | Peak chart positions | | | | | | | | | | Certifications |
| Title | Album details | UK | AUS | AUT | CAN | GER | JPN | NLD | NOR | SWE | US | Certifications |
|---|---|---|---|---|---|---|---|---|---|---|---|---|
| Led Zeppelin | Released: 20 January 1969; Label: Atlantic; Format: CS, CD, LP, 8-track | 6 | 1 | 18 | 11 | 11 | — | 14 | 14 | 11 | 7 | BPI: 2× Platinum; ARIA: 2× Platinum; CRIA: Diamond; IFPI SWI: Gold; NVPI: Gold; RIAA: 8× Platinum; RMNZ: Gold |
| Led Zeppelin II | Released: 22 October 1969; Label: Atlantic; Format: CS, CD, LP, 8-track | 1 | 1 | 25 | 1 | 1 | 8 | 1 | 2 | 4 | 1 | BPI: 4× Platinum; ARIA: 4× Platinum; BVMI: Platinum; CRIA: 9× Platinum; IFPI AUT: Gold; RIAA: Diamond (12× Platinum) |
| Led Zeppelin III | Released: 5 October 1970; Label: Atlantic; Format: CS, CD, LP, 8-track | 1 | 1 | 24 | 1 | 3 | 8 | 3 | 3 | 1 | 1 | BPI: Platinum; ARIA: 3× Platinum; BVMI: Gold; IFPI SWI: Gold; NVPI: Gold; RIAA: 6× Platinum |
| Led Zeppelin IV (Note: The fourth Led Zeppelin album was untitled and is generally known as Led Zeppelin IV. It is also referred to as Four Symbols, Runes, Untitled and Zoso.) | Released: 8 November 1971; Label: Atlantic; Format: CS, CD, LP, 8-track | 1 | 2 | 12 | 1 | 5 | 2 | 7 | 3 | 8 | 2 | BPI: 6× Platinum; ARIA: 9× Platinum; BVMI: 3× Gold; CRIA: 2× Diamond; IFPI SWI: 2× Platinum; NVPI: Platinum; RIAA: 2× Diamond (24× Platinum) |
| Houses of the Holy | Released: 28 March 1973; Label: Atlantic; Format: CS, CD, LP, 8-track | 1 | 1 | 3 | 1 | 8 | 3 | 3 | 4 | 15 | 1 | BPI: Platinum; ARIA: 2× Platinum; BVMI: Gold; RIAA: Diamond (11× Platinum) |
| Physical Graffiti | Released: 24 February 1975; Label: Swan Song; Format: CS, CD, LP, 8-track | 1 | 2 | 2 | 1 | 4 | 13 | 7 | 4 | 7 | 1 | BPI: 2× Platinum; ARIA: 3× Platinum; BVMI: Gold; RIAA: Diamond (16× Platinum) |
| Presence | Released: 31 March 1976; Label: Swan Song; Format: CS, CD, LP, 8-track | 1 | 4 | 16 | 16 | 6 | 2 | 5 | 4 | 5 | 1 | BPI: Platinum; RIAA: 3× Platinum |
| In Through the Out Door | Released: 22 August 1979; Label: Swan Song; Format: CS, CD, LP, 8-track | 1 | 3 | 15 | 1 | 9 | 2 | 20 | 14 | 6 | 1 | BPI: Platinum; ARIA: 2× Platinum; RIAA: 6× Platinum |
| Coda | Released: 26 November 1982; Label: Swan Song; Format: CS, CD, LP, 8-track | 4 | 9 | 17 | 3 | 5 | 16 | 9 | 7 | 18 | 6 | BPI: Silver; RIAA: Platinum |
"—" denotes releases that did not chart or were not released.

=== Live albums ===
List of live albums, with selected chart positions and certifications
| Title | Album details | Peak chart positions | | | | | | | | | | Certifications |
| Title | Album details | UK | AUS | AUT | CAN | GER | JPN | NLD | NZ | NOR | US | Certifications |
|---|---|---|---|---|---|---|---|---|---|---|---|---|
| The Song Remains the Same | Released: 22 October 1976; Label: Swan Song; Format: CS, CD, LP, 8-track | 1 | 8 | 37 | 8 | 20 | 6 | 19 | 6 | 21 | 2 | BPI: Platinum; BVMI: Gold; RIAA: 4× Platinum; RMNZ: 3× Platinum |
| BBC Sessions | Released: 17 November 1997; Label: Atlantic; Format: CS, CD, LP | 23 | 60 | — | 30 | — | 10 | — | 26 | 36 | 12 | BPI: Gold; RIAA: 2× Platinum; RIAJ: Gold |
| How the West Was Won | Released: 27 May 2003; Label: Atlantic; Format: CD | 5 | 10 | 17 | 1 | 11 | 3 | 47 | 13 | 10 | 1 | BPI: Gold; CRIA: Platinum; RIAA: Platinum |
| Celebration Day (Note: Celebration Day was released on CD, DVD and Blu-ray on 19 November 2012. The vinyl edition was released on 12 February 2013.) | Released: 19 November 2012; Label: Atlantic; Format: CD, DVD, Blu-ray, LP | 4 | 3 | 3 | 4 | 1 | — | 2 | 1 | 2 | 9 | BPI: Platinum; ARIA: Gold; BVMI: Platinum; IFPI SWI: Gold; IFPI SWI: Platinum (DVD); CRIA: 2× Platinum; IFPI SWE: Gold; RIANZ: Platinum |
"—" denotes releases that did not chart or were not released.

=== Compilation albums ===
List of compilation albums, with selected chart positions and certifications
| Title | Album details | Peak chart positions | | | | | | | | | | Certifications |
| Title | Album details | UK | AUS | AUT | CAN | GER | JPN | NLD | NZ | NOR | US | Certifications |
|---|---|---|---|---|---|---|---|---|---|---|---|---|
| Coda | Released: 26 November 1982; Label: Swan Song; Format: CS, CD, LP, 8-track | 4 | 9 | 17 | 3 | 5 | 16 | 9 | 7 | 18 | 6 | BPI: Silver; RIAA: Platinum |
| Led Zeppelin Remasters | Released: 15 October 1990; Label: Atlantic; Format: CS, CD, LP | 10 | 1 | 19 | 46 | 13 | 32 | 33 | 3 | 8 | 47 | BPI: 2× Platinum; ARIA: 10× Platinum; BVMI: Platinum; IFPI AUT: Gold; IFPI NOR: Gold; IFPI SWI: Gold; RIAA: 2× Platinum |
| Led Zeppelin Boxed Set | Released: 23 October 1990; Label: Atlantic; Format: CS, CD, LP | 48 | 46 | — | — | — | 17 | — | — | — | 18 | BPI: Silver; CRIA: Gold; RIAA: Diamond |
| Led Zeppelin Boxed Set 2 | Released: 20 September 1993; Label: Atlantic; Format: CD | 56 | — | — | — | — | 45 | — | 48 | — | 87 | RIAA: Gold |
| The Complete Studio Recordings | Released: 18 October 1993; Label: Atlantic; Format: CD | — | — | — | — | — | — | — | — | — | — | RIAA: 2× Platinum |
| Early Days: Best of Led Zeppelin Volume One | Released: 23 November 1999; Label: Atlantic; Format: CS, CD, LP | 55 | — | 23 | — | 71 | — | — | — | — | 71 | BPI: Silver; CRIA: Gold; RIAA: Platinum |
| Latter Days: Best of Led Zeppelin Volume Two | Released: 21 March 2000; Label: Atlantic; Format: CS, CD, LP | 40 | — | — | — | — | — | — | — | — | 81 | |
| Early Days and Latter Days | Released: 19 November 2002; Label: Atlantic; Format: CD | 11 | — | — | — | 96 | — | — | 17 | — | 114 | BPI: Platinum; RIAA: Platinum |
| Mothership | Released: 12 November 2007; Label: Atlantic; Format: CD, LP | 4 | 8 | 4 | 15 | 4 | 7 | 15 | 1 | 1 | 7 | BPI: 4× Platinum; ARIA: 2× Platinum; BVMI: 3× Gold; CRIA: 3× Platinum; IFPI AUT: Gold; IFPI SWI: Gold; RIAA: 2× Platinum; RMNZ: 4× Platinum |
| Definitive Collection | Released: 4 November 2008; Label: Atlantic/Rhino; Format: CD | — | — | — | — | — | 23 | — | — | — | — | |
"—" denotes releases that did not chart or were not released.

==== Download compilations ====
To celebrate their 50th anniversary, the band unveiled three new digital-only releases on 27 September 2018, available on Spotify, Apple Music, Pandora, and Amazon.

Download-only Led Zeppelin compilation albums
| Title | Album details |
|---|---|
| Led Zeppelin x Led Zeppelin | Released: 27 September 2018; Label: Rhino Atlantic; Format: download only |
| An Intro to Led Zeppelin | Released: 27 September 2018; Label: Rhino Atlantic; Format: download only |
| Rock & Roll (Sunset Sound Mix) | Released: 27 September 2018; Label: Rhino Atlantic; Format: download only |

== Extended plays ==
List of extended plays, with selected chart positions
| Title | EP details | Peak chart positions | | | | | |
| Title | EP details | UK | AUS | AUT | GER | SWI | US |
|---|---|---|---|---|---|---|---|
| Live E.P. | Released: 12 September 2025; Label: Atlantic; Format: CD, LP, download | 16 | 46 | 9 | 17 | 13 | 150 |

== Singles, other charted songs and music downloads ==
=== Singles ===
List of singles, with selected chart positions
| Year | Title | Peak chart positions | | | | | | | | | | Certification | Album |
| Year | Title | UK | AUS | CAN | DEN | GER | JPN | NLD | NZ | SWI | US | Certification | Album |
|---|---|---|---|---|---|---|---|---|---|---|---|---|---|
| 1969 | "Good Times Bad Times" b/w "Communication Breakdown" | — | — | 64 | — | — | — | 17 | — | — | 80 | BPI: Silver; RMNZ: Gold | Led Zeppelin |
| 1969 | "Babe I'm Gonna Leave You" b/w "Dazed and Confused" (promotional single) | — | — | — | — | — | — | — | — | — | — | RMNZ: Gold | Led Zeppelin |
| 1969 | "Whole Lotta Love" b/w "Living Loving Maid (She's Just a Woman)" | 21 (Note: "Whole Lotta Love" did not enter the main chart in the United Kingdom until 1997. Due to digital downloads, the single re-entered the chart in 2007, peaking at number 21.) | 1 | 3 | 1 | 1 | — 93 | 5 | 4 | 5 | 4; 65 | BPI: Platinum; RIAA: Gold; RMNZ: 2× Platinum | Led Zeppelin II |
| 1970 | "Immigrant Song" b/w "Hey, Hey, What Can I Do" | 109 (Note: "Immigrant Song" did not enter the main chart in the United Kingdom until 2007 when it peaked at number 109 due to digital downloads.) | 23 | 4 | 3 | 6 | 13 | 9 | 4 | 4 | 16 | BPI: Platinum; RMNZ: 2× Platinum | Led Zeppelin III |
| 1970 | "Gallows Pole" (promotional single) | — | — | — | — | — | — | — | — | — | — | | Led Zeppelin III |
| 1971 | "Black Dog" b/w "Misty Mountain Hop" | 119 (Note: "Black Dog" did not enter the main chart in the United Kingdom until 2007 when it peaked at number 119 due to digital downloads.) | 10 | 11 | 5 | 22 | 24 | 20 | 10 | 6 | 15 | BPI: Silver; RMNZ: Platinum | Led Zeppelin IV |
| 1971 | "Stairway to Heaven" (promotional single) | 37 (Note: "Stairway to Heaven" did not enter the main chart in the United Kingdom until 2007 when it peaked at number 37 due to digital downloads.) | — | — | — | 15 | — | — | 13 | 17 | — | BPI: 2× Platinum; RMNZ: 5× Platinum | Led Zeppelin IV |
| 1972 | "Rock and Roll" b/w "Four Sticks" | — | 51 | 38 | — | 13 | — | — | — | — | 47 | BPI: Silver; RMNZ: Gold | Led Zeppelin IV |
| 1973 | "Over the Hills and Far Away" b/w "Dancing Days" | — | — | 63 | — | — | — | — | — | — | 51 | RMNZ: Gold | Houses of the Holy |
| 1973 | "D'yer Mak'er" b/w "The Crunge" | — | — | 24 | — | — | — | — | — | — | 20 | RMNZ: Gold | Houses of the Holy |
| 1973 | "The Ocean" b/w "Over the Hills and Far Away" "Dancing Days" | — | — | — | — | 8 | — | — | — | — | — | | Houses of the Holy |
| 1975 | "Trampled Under Foot" b/w "Black Country Woman" | — | 60 | 41 | — | — | — | — | — | — | 38 | | Physical Graffiti |
| 1976 | "Candy Store Rock" b/w "Royal Orleans" | — | — | — | — | — | — | — | — | — | — | | Presence |
| 1979 | "Fool in the Rain" b/w "Hot Dog" | — | — | 12 | — | — | — | — | 44 | — | 21 | | In Through the Out Door |
| 1990 | "Travelling Riverside Blues" | — | — | 57 | — | — | — | — | — | — | — | | Boxed Set |
| 1993 | "Baby Come On Home" | — | — | 66 | — | — | — | — | — | — | — | | Boxed Set 2 |
| 1997 | "The Girl I Love She Got Long Black Wavy Hair" | — | — | 49 | — | — | — | — | — | — | — | | BBC Sessions |
| 2007 | "Kashmir" | 80 | — | — | — | — | — | — | — | 64 | — | BPI: Gold; RMNZ: Platinum | Mothership |
| 2018 | "Rock and Roll (Sunset Sound Mix)" b/w "Friends (Olympic Studio Mix)" | — | — | — | — | — | — | — | — | — | — | | Record Store Day release |
"—" denotes releases that did not chart or were not released. "N/A" denotes chart did not exist at that time

=== Other charted songs ===
List of other charted songs, with selected chart positions
| Title | Year | Peak chart positions | Album |
| Title | Year | US Main | Album |
|---|---|---|---|
| "Darlene" | 1982 | 4 | Coda |
| "Ozone Baby" | 1982 | 14 | Coda |
| "Poor Tom" | 1982 | 18 | Coda |

=== Download singles ===
List of music downloads, with selected chart positions
| Title | Year | Peak chart positions | | Certifications | Album |
| Title | Year | CAN Digital | US Digital | Certifications | Album |
|---|---|---|---|---|---|
| "Babe I'm Gonna Leave You" | 2007 | — | — | RMNZ: Gold | Led Zeppelin |
| "Dazed and Confused" | 2007 | — | — | RMNZ: Gold | Led Zeppelin |
| "Ramble On" | 2007 | 66 | — | BPI: Silver; RMNZ: Platinum | Led Zeppelin II |
| "Immigrant Song" | 2007 | 54 | 71 | | Led Zeppelin III |
| "Black Dog" | 2007 | 59 | 66 | | Led Zeppelin IV |
| "When the Levee Breaks" | 2007 | — | — | RMNZ: Gold | Led Zeppelin IV |
| "Stairway to Heaven" | 2007 | 17 | 30 | | Led Zeppelin IV |
| "Kashmir" | 2007 | 33 | 42 | | Physical Graffiti |
| "All My Love" | 2007 | — | — | RMNZ: Gold | In Through the Out Door |
"—" denotes releases that did not chart or were not released.

== Video albums and concert films ==
List of video albums, with selected certifications
| Title | Album details | Certifications |
|---|---|---|
| The Song Remains the Same (Note: The Song Remains the Same was first released theatrically on 20 October 1976. It was issued on VHS in 1984 and on DVD in 1999, and reissued on DVD and Blu-ray in 2007.) | Released: 1976; Studio: Warner Bros.; Format: VHS, DVD, Blu-ray | BPI: 6× Platinum |
| Led Zeppelin DVD | Released: 26 May 2003; Studio: Atlantic; Format: DVD | BPI: 5× Platinum; ARIA: 7× Platinum; RIAA: Diamond (13× Platinum); RIAJ: Gold; CRIA: 2× Diamond |
| Mothership | Released: 12 November 2007; Label: Atlantic; Format: DVD | BVMI: 2× Platinum |
| Celebration Day | Released: 19 November 2012; Label: Atlantic; Format: DVD, Blu-ray | BVMI: 7× Gold; RIAA: 3× Platinum |

== Music videos ==
Led Zeppelin music videos
| Year | Title | Release | Reference |
|---|---|---|---|
| 1969 | "Communication Breakdown" | Led Zeppelin | |
| 1976 | "Black Dog" | The Song Remains the Same | |
| 1979 | "Hot Dog" | In Through the Out Door | |
| 1990 | "Over the Hills and Far Away" | Led Zeppelin Boxed Set | |
| 1990 | "Travelling Riverside Blues" | Led Zeppelin Boxed Set | |
| 1997 | "Whole Lotta Love" | BBC Sessions | |
| 2003 | "Immigrant Song" | Led Zeppelin DVD | |
| 2003 | "Going to California" | Led Zeppelin DVD | |
| 2003 | "Stairway to Heaven" | Led Zeppelin DVD | |
| 2003 | "Rock And Roll" | Led Zeppelin DVD | |
| 2003 | "Kashmir" | Led Zeppelin DVD | |
| 2012 | "Black Dog" | Celebration Day | |
| 2012 | "Kashmir" | Celebration Day | |
| 2014 | "Whole Lotta Love (Rough Mix With Vocal)" | Led Zeppelin II (Deluxe Edition) | |
| 2014 | "Rock And Roll (Alternate Mix)" | Led Zeppelin IV (Deluxe Edition) | |
| 2016 | "What Is And What Should Never Be" | The Complete BBC Sessions | |

== See also ==
- Led Zeppelin bootleg recordings
- List of songs recorded by Led Zeppelin
- Jimmy Page discography
- Robert Plant discography
- Category:Led Zeppelin tribute albums
