= Charlie Jones (musician) =

English bassist, songwriter and record producer (born 1965)

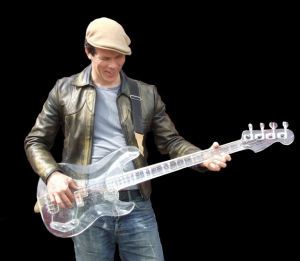

Background information
- Born: Stephen Charles Jones; 13 October 1965 (age 60); Bristol, England
- Occupations: Composer; musician; producer
- Instruments: Bass guitar; double bass
- Years active: 1981–present
- Member of: The Cult
- Formerly of: Page and Plant
- Website: charliejones.net

Stephen Charles Jones (born 13 October 1965) is an English musician, songwriter and record producer, best known for his work as a bassist for various artists, including Robert Plant, Page and Plant, Goldfrapp, and Siouxsie Sioux. He is currently the bassist for The Cult. Jones won a Grammy Award for Record of the Year in 2009 for co-writing the song "Please Read the Letter" from the album Raising Sand by Robert Plant and Alison Krauss.

== Career ==
Jones' career as a recording and touring artist has spanned well over three decades. In the passing of time, he worked with Robert Plant, Page and Plant, Loreena McKennitt, Goldfrapp, Siouxsie Sioux, and others. He plays both electric and double bass.

Jones received a Grammy Award in 2009 as a co-writer of the song "Please Read the Letter" from the album Raising Sand by Robert Plant and Alison Krauss, originally recorded by Page and Plant for the album Walking into Clarksdale.

On 16 September 2013 Jones released his debut solo album, Love Form, through Stranger Records, which highlighted his jazz and classical influences.

Whilst Jones has largely been associated with playing an acrylic bass, Fender Custom Shop built him a plastic precision bass in 2022. This work was undertaken by Master Builder Scott Buehl.

== Recording credits ==
Year	Artist	Release	Version	Role	Notes	Ref.
1985	Violent Blue	"You've Got to Stay Young"	LP	electric bass / songwriter		
1988	Ofra Haza	"Shaday"	LP	electric bass		
1990	Various	"Live at Knebworth"	LP / Video	electric bass		
1990	Robert Plant	"Manic Nirvana"	LP	electric bass / songwriter		
1993	Robert Plant	"Fate of Nations"	LP	double bass & electric bass / songwriter		
1995	Jimmy Page & Robert Plant	"No Quarter – Unledded"	LP / Video	double bass & electric bass		
1996	Definition of Sound	"Experience"	LP	electric bass		
1996	The Chernobyl Poppies	"The Chernobyl Poppies"	LP	electric bass		
1997	Innes Sibun	"Stardust"	LP	electric bass		
1997	A Rainer Ptacek Tribute / Various	"The Inner Flame"	LP	electric bass		
1998	Jimmy Page & Robert Plant	"Walking into Clarksdale"	LP	electric bass / songwriter		
1998	Jimmy Page & Robert Plant	"Most High"	LP track	electric bass / songwriter	Grammy for Best Rock Performance No. 1 in Mainstream Rock Chart	
1999	Strange Fruit	"Still Crazy"	Soundtrack	electric bass	Nominated for Golden Globe Award	
1999	Robert Plant	"A Tribute to Skip Spence"	LP	double bass		
2002	The High and Lonesome	"From the Playground"	LP	double bass		
2002	Robert Plant	"Dreamland"	LP	electric bass / songwriter	Nominated for Grammy for Best Rock Album	
2003	Goldfrapp	"Black Cherry"	LP	electric bass		
2003	Innes Sibun	"East Monroe"	LP	electric bass		
2003	Tom McRae	"Just Like Blood"	LP	electric bass		
2003	Robert Plant	"Sixty Six to Timbuktu"	LP	electric bass / songwriter		
2004	Goldfrapp	"Wonderful Electric (Live in London)"	LP / Video	electric bass		
2005	Goldfrapp	"Supernature"	LP	electric bass		
2006	Loreena McKennitt	"An Ancient Muse"	LP	double bass & electric bass		
2006	Robert Plant	"Nine Lives"	LP	electric bass / songwriter		
2007	Siouxsie	"Mantaray"	LP	Producer / double bass & electric bass / songwriter		
2007	Alison Krauss, Robert Plant	"Raising Sand"	LP track	songwriter	Grammy Award	
2008	Merz	"Loveheart"	LP	double bass & electric bass		
2008	Shelleyan Orphan	"We Have Everything We Need "	LP	double bass & electric bass		
2008	Goldfrapp	"Seventh Tree"	LP	electric bass		
2008	Jimmy Page & Robert Plant	"Live At Irvine Meadows"	LP / Video	electric bass		
2008	Siouxsie	"If It Doesn't Kill You (Live From Le Tour Eiffel, Paris, France)"	LP / Video	double bass & electric bass		
2009	Polly Scattergood	"Polly Scattergood"	LP	electric bass		
2009	Goldfrapp	"Nowhere Boy"	Soundtrack	double bass		
2009	David Rhodes	"Bittersweet"	LP	double bass & electric bass		
2009	The Proclaimers	"Notes & Rhymes"	LP	harmonica		
2010	Goldfrapp	"Head First"	LP	electric bass		
2010	Jim Kerr	"Lost Boy"	LP	electric bass		
2013	David Rhodes	"The David Rhodes Band"	LP	electric bass		
2013	Goldfrapp	"Tales of Us"	LP	electric bass		
2013	Little Boots	"Nocturnes"	LP	electric bass		
2013	Charlie Jones	"Love Form"	LP	artist, producer, songwriter		
2014	Novastar	"Inside Outside"	LP	electric bass		
2014	Susheela Raman	"Queen Between"	LP	electric bass		
2015	Laura Pausini	"Simili"	LP	electric bass		
2016	Jennifer Crook	"The Year, She Turns "	LP	electric bass		
2017	Goldfrapp	"Silver Eye"	LP	electric bass		
2017	Jimmy Copley	"Psychefunk (Live On Through The Music)"	EP	electric bass		
2018	Laura Pausini	"Fatti Sentire"	LP	electric bass		
2020	Robert Plant	"Digging Deep: Subterranea"	LP	electric bass / songwriter		
2021	Marti Pellow	"Stargazer"	LP	electric bass		
2021	Imelda May	"11 Past the Hour"	LP	electric bass		
2022	The Cult	"Under the Midnight Sun"	LP	electric bass		
2023	Adam Masterson	"Time Bomb"	LP	electric bass		
2023	Maven Grace	"Sleep Standing Up"	LP	electric bass		
2026	Death Cult	"Paradise Live"	LP	electric bass		

== Touring credits ==
Years	Artist	Role
1988–1994	Robert Plant	double bass & electric bass
1994–1998	Page and Plant	double bass & electric bass
2000–2002	Robert Plant	double bass & electric bass
2003–2019	Goldfrapp	double bass & electric bass
2008	Siouxsie Sioux	double bass & electric bass
2012	Crybaby	double bass & electric bass
2013	David Rhodes	double bass & electric bass
2022	Goldfrapp	electric bass
2022–present	The Cult	electric bass
