= Exile and the Kingdom (album) =

Studio album by Jeff Martin
- Released: April 11, 2006
- Recorded: Caroline Studios, Durrus, County Cork, Ireland
- Genre: Rock
- Length: 42:48
- Label: Koch Entertainment Canada, Shock Records
- Producer: Jeff Martin

Jeff Martin chronology
Exile and the Kingdom (2006)	Live in Brisbane 2006 (2006)

Singles from Exile and the Kingdom
- 1. "World Is Calling" Released: 2006; 2. "Where Do We Go from Here" Released: 2006

Professional ratings
Review scores
Source	Rating
AllMusic	
Popjournalism	3/5 stars

Exile and the Kingdom (2006) is the debut solo album from Canadian singer/songwriter Jeff Martin. The title is derived from the 1957 book of the same name by Albert Camus.

== Track listing ==
All songs are written by Jeff Martin, except track 1 by Martin, Michael Lee and Ritesh Das.

1. "World Is Calling" – 5:24
2. "Butterfly" – 3:31
3. "Where Do We Go from Here" – 3:37
4. "Daystar" – 3:59
5. "Lament" – 4:34
6. "Angeldust" – 4:51
7. "Black Snake Blues" – 3:32
8. "Stay Inside of Me" – 3:40
9. "The Kingdom" – 6:22
10. "Good Time Song" – 3:18

== Personnel ==
=== Recording personnel ===
- Produced by Jeff Martin
- Executive Producer Michael Lee Jackson
- Associate Executive producers: Dr. Michael Virro, Perry Tapanainen
- Recorded & engineered by Nick Blagona
- Assistant engineers: Evan Ritchie, Barry Nolan
- Mixed by: Nick Blagona & Jeff Martin
- Assistant mix engineer: Luke Fountain
- All songs recorded at Caroline Studios, Durrus, County Cork, Ireland
- All songs mixed at Metalworks Recording Studio, Mississauga, Ontario, Canada
- Mastered by Nick Blagona at Metalworks Recording Studios
- Published by JMartin Music (SOCAN)

=== Musicians ===
- "World Is Calling":

Jeff Martin – vocals, electric guitars, bass guitar, emulator synthesizer, dumbek
Ritesh Das – tabla, chant.
Michael Lee – drums.
Marc Oulette – String arrangement & composition

- "Butterfly":

Jeff Martin – vocals, acoustic guitars, electric guitars, bass guitar, Fender Telecaster B-bender, Hammond B3
Ritesh Das – udu
Michael Lee – drums

- "Daystar":

Jeff Martin – vocals, acoustic guitars, electric guitars, bass guitar, sitar, sarod, tanpura, hurdy-gurdy, piano
Ritesh Das – tabla, dholak, dunun, udu
Michael Lee – Drums

- "Lament":

Jeff Martin – vocals, Ellis 7 string resonator guitar, electric guitars, bass guitar, E-bow, emulator synth
Ritesh Das – tabla, dunun
Michael Lee – Drums
Evan Ritchie – manjira

- "Angeldust":

Jeff Martin – vocals, acoustic guitars, esraj emulator synth
Nick Blagona – shakers, hand drum

- "Black Snake Blues":

Jeff Martin – vocals, Ellis 7-string resonator guitar, bass guitar, banjo
Michael Lee – Drums
New Beginning Choral Ensemble
Rodney Appleby – choir vocal arrangement & conducting

- "Stay Inside of Me":

Jeff Martin – vocals, acoustic guitars, mandolin, emulator synth
Jenny Laws – Vocals

- "The Kingdom":

Jeff Martin – vocals, acoustic guitars, electric guitars, bass guitar, mandolin, piano, Hammond B3, emulator synth
Ritesh Das – tabla, manjira
Michael Lee – Drums
Marc Oulette – string arrangement & composition
New Beginning Choral Ensemble
Rodney Appleby – choral vocal arrangement & conducting
Nick Blagona – tambourine

- "Good Time Song":

Jeff Martin – vocals, acoustic guitars, Ellis 7 string resonator guitar
Ritesh Das – table (yes, "table")
Larsen Liebig – double bass
Terry Scott – spoons

== Charts ==
Chart performance for Exile and the Kingdom
Chart (2006)	Peak position
Australian Albums (ARIA)	44
