= Mike Piersante =

American music engineer

Mike Piersante is a recording engineer and mixer.

== 2009 Grammy Awards ==
Mike Piersante won two Grammy Awards in 2009 for his work as Engineer/Mixer. The first Grammy was for "Please Read the Letter" a duet track by Alison Krauss and Robert Plant. Krauss and Plant sang this track as a duet which was released on the album Raising Sand, available on Rounder which won another 2009 Grammy for Mike Piersante for Album of the Year.

== Recording 2021 Ionic Originals Recordings ==
Piersante recorded and mixed the mid-2021 Bob Dylan recordings of "Blowin' in the Wind," "Masters of War," "The Times They Are A-Changin' (song)," "Simple Twist of Fate," "Gotta Serve Somebody," and "Not Dark Yet" produced by T-Bone Burnett for a one-time sale as Ionic Originals.
