= Rich Woman =

Single by Robert Plant and Alison Krauss

from the album Raising Sand
- Released: October 23, 2007
- Recorded: 2007
- Genre: R&B, folk rock
- Length: 4:05
- Label: Rounder
- Songwriters: Dorothy LaBostrie, McKinley Millet
- Producer: T Bone Burnett

Robert Plant singles chronology
"Please Read the Letter" (2008)	"Rich Woman" (2008)	"Sliver Rider" (2010)

Alison Krauss singles chronology
"Please Read the Letter" (2008)	"Rich Woman" (2008)	"Shadows" (2008)

"Rich Woman" is a song written by Dorothy LaBostrie and McKinley "Li'l" Millet, who recorded it in 1955, and was most notably recorded by Robert Plant and Alison Krauss on their 2007 album Raising Sand.

== Background ==
The song was first recorded by Li'l Millet and his Creoles, for Specialty Records. He co-wrote the song with LaBostrie, who had previously co-written "Tutti-Frutti" with Little Richard. Li'l Millet and His Creoles played clubs in Louisiana and Mississippi. They were heard playing at a club in Thibodaux, Louisiana by Bumps Blackwell of Specialty Records, who signed them to a contract and first recorded them at Cosimo Matassa's J&M Studios in September 1955 and released in November 1955. The band comprised Millet (vocals, bass), Edgar Myles (vocals, trombone), Lee Allen (tenor sax), Ernest Mare (guitar), Bartholomew Smith (drums), James Victor Lewis (tenor sax) and Warren Myles (piano).

== Cover versions ==
Canned Heat recorded it for their eponymous first album, in 1967, on Liberty Records.

The Fabulous Thunderbirds included it on their eponymous first album (also known as Girls Go Wild) in 1979, on Chrysalis Records.

Robert Plant & Alison Krauss opened their 2007 album Raising Sand with their version of the song.

Boz Scaggs opened his 2015 album A Fool To Care, with his version on the indie label, 429 Records. His version most closely resembles the Li'l Millet original.

== Robert Plant & Alison Krauss version ==
Country singer Alison Krauss and former Led Zeppelin vocalist Robert Plant included their version on their 2007 duet album Raising Sand; at the suggestion of their noted producer T Bone Burnett. It was also released as a CD single and as a digital download.

It won the 2009 Grammy Award for Best Pop Collaboration with Vocals.

=== Live performances ===
Plant & Krauss performed this song along with their first single "Gone, Gone, Gone (Done Moved On)" at the 51st Annual Grammy Awards in 2009. They also performed this song at the JazzFest 2008.

=== In popular culture ===
The single was prominently featured in the motion picture, Mad Money, starring Diane Keaton, Katie Holmes and Queen Latifah, as background music, constantly throughout the film, which alternatively ties into the film score.

It can also be heard in the motion picture Sicario, starring Emily Blunt, Benicio del Toro, and Josh Brolin.

The original Rich Woman by Li'l Millet and His Creoles is the final song of the end credits of Green Book, the 2019 Best Film Oscar winner

=== Chart performance ===
The song entered the Billboard Bubbling Under Hot 100 Singles chart at #18 on the week of February 28, 2009. It only stayed on the chart for a week.

Chart (2009)	Peak position
U.S. Billboard Bubbling Under Hot 100	18
