= Lucifer Rising and Other Sound Tracks =

Soundtrack album by Jimmy Page
- Released: March 2012
- Genre: Rock
- Label: Self-released
- Producer: Jimmy Page

Lucifer Rising and Other Sound Tracks is an album by English musician Jimmy Page, released on vinyl record only exclusively through his web page on the Spring Equinox of 2012. It contained music Page produced, but never used, for the Kenneth Anger film, Lucifer Rising.

== Track listing ==
Side A

1. "Lucifer Rising - Main Track" (20:29)

Side B

1. "Incubus" (1:43)
2. "Damask" (2:00)
3. "Unharmonics" (2:04)
4. "Damask - Ambient" (2:02)
5. "Lucifer Rising - Percussive Return" (3:21)
