= Li'l Millet =

American rhythm and blues musician (1935–1997)

- Born: McKinley James Millet Jr. October 25, 1935; New Orleans, Louisiana, US
- Died: June 29, 1997 (aged 61) New Orleans, Louisiana, U.S.
- Genre: Rhythm and blues
- Occupations: Singer, songwriter, musician
- Instruments: Piano, bass, vocals
- Years active: 1946-1980s
- Label: Specialty

McKinley James Millet Jr. (October 25, 1935 – June 29, 1997) was an American Rhythm and blues pianist, bassist, singer and songwriter, best known for co-writing and first performing the songs "Rich Woman" and "All Around the World" with his group, Li'l Millet and His Creoles.

== Life and career ==
He was born in New Orleans, Louisiana. At the age of 10, he played in a band with his brothers, performing pop hits of the day. By about 1952, he had joined the Hawkettes, but left before they recorded, being replaced in the group by Art Neville. He then formed his own band, Li'l Millet and His Creoles, who played clubs in Louisiana and Mississippi. The band comprised Millet (vocals, bass), Edgar Myles (vocals, trombone), Lee Allen (tenor sax), Ernest Mare (guitar), Bartholomew Smith (drums), James Victor Lewis (tenor sax) and Warren Myles (piano). They were heard playing at a club in Thibodaux, Louisiana by Bumps Blackwell of Specialty Records, who signed them to a contract and first recorded them at Cosimo Matassa's J&M Studios in September 1955.

Their first single, "Rich Woman" / "Hopeless Love", was released in November 1955. "Rich Woman" was co-written by Millet with Dorothy LaBostrie, and was later recorded by Canned Heat, The Fabulous Thunderbirds, and Robert Plant & Alison Krauss, for whom it won the 2009 Grammy Award for Best Pop Collaboration with Vocals.

Millet recorded again in 1956, but the results were unissued until the 1980s or later. He also worked as a songwriter, co-writing "All Around the World", which was recorded by Little Richard as the B-side of his 1956 hit "The Girl Can't Help It". Millet's demo version of the song was unissued until 1993.

Li'l Millet and His Creoles continued to perform locally until the 1980s. After the dissolution of his band, Millet worked as a bus driver in the 1990s and played a few charity events. He died of cancer in 1997.
