= Dorothy LaBostrie =

American songwriter (1928–2007)

- Also known as: Dorothy LaBostrie Black
- Born: Dorothy LaBostrie; May 18, 1928; Rayland, Kentucky, United States
- Died: November 4, 2007 (aged 79) Atlanta, Georgia, United States
- Occupation: Songwriter
- Years active: c.1954–1970

Dorothy LaBostrie (May 28, 1928 – November 4, 2007), later Dorothy LaBostrie Black, was an American songwriter, best known for co-writing Little Richard's 1955 hit "Tutti Frutti".

== Early life and family ==
She was born in Rayland, Kentucky; some sources incorrectly claim a birth year of 1938 rather than 1928. Her parents were Amos and Orelia C. LaBostrie. She was raised in Mobile, Alabama, and in 1951 she moved to New Orleans, Louisiana, to seek out her father's Creole relatives. She started working as a cook and waitress, wrote poems, and began frequenting the blues and jazz clubs on Rampart Street.

== Songwriting career ==
In September 1955 – though details of the story vary – she was contacted by record producer Bumps Blackwell of Specialty Records, who needed someone to rewrite and tone down the lyrics of a ribald song performed by Little Richard. LaBostrie went to Cosimo Matassa's studio, where Richard was recording, and reportedly rewrote the words of the song in 15 minutes. "Tutti Frutti" is regarded as one of the defining songs of rock and roll, and has been recorded by many later artists.

She was credited as co-writer of the song, with Richard Wayne Penniman (Little Richard's complete name), but later claimed that she had written it in its entirety. She later laughed at Little Richard's claim that he had written the song by himself and was cheated out of royalties for years, saying: "Little Richard didn't write none of 'Tutti Frutti'." She was still receiving royalty checks for the song, at an average of $5,000 every three to six months, in the 1980s.

Also in 1955, she contributed another song to Specialty, "Rich Woman", co-written and performed by rhythm and blues musician Li'l Millet, stage name of McKinley James Millet Jr. Although not successful at the time, it was later recorded by Canned Heat among others, and most notably by Robert Plant and Alison Krauss, whose recording of it won the 2009 Grammy Award for Best Pop Collaboration with Vocals.

She later worked as a songwriter for Joe Ruffino, owner of the local record labels Ric and Ron. In 1958, she wrote the song "I Won't Cry", and persuaded Ruffino to allow her neighbor, Johnny Adams, to record it. The record, produced by then teenager Dr. John, a blues and r&b musician also known as Mac Rebennack, was a local hit and started Adams' successful career. She also wrote Irma Thomas' first record, "(You Can Have My Husband But Please) Don't Mess With My Man", which reached the national R&B chart in 1960. Her working relationship with Ruffino later deteriorated over royalty payments. She signed a songwriting contract with Matassa's White Cliffs publishing company, reportedly writing hundreds of songs over the following years, but none had the commercial success of her earlier songs.

== Later life and death ==
At some point, she married Clyde Black and had two daughters. In 1970, after being injured in a road accident, she moved to New York and broke her ties with the music business. In the 1980s, she was reported to be living a quiet life, receiving regular royalty payments from the continued popularity of "Tutti Frutti".

Dorothy LaBostrie Black died while visiting friends in Atlanta, Georgia, on 4 November 2007, aged 79.
