= Page and Plant =

1990s English rock band

- Page and Plant, 1998

Background information
- Origin: London, England
- Genres: Hard rock, folk rock, symphonic rock, world music, blues rock
- Years active: 1994–1998, 2001
- Labels: Atlantic, Fontana, Mercury
- Spinoff of: Led Zeppelin
- Past members: Jimmy Page; Robert Plant; Charlie Jones; Michael Lee

Page and Plant (also known as Jimmy Page & Robert Plant) were an English rock band active between 1994 and 1998. The group consisted of guitarist Jimmy Page and vocalist Robert Plant (both formerly of English rock band Led Zeppelin), accompanied by bassist Charlie Jones and drummer Michael Lee. Formed in 1994 for an MTV Unplugged reunion, Page and Plant released the platinum-selling live album No Quarter, featuring both new material and Middle Eastern-influenced covers of classic Led Zeppelin songs. Following the success of the live album, they embarked on a world tour featuring a full orchestra.

In 1998, Page and Plant released Walking into Clarksdale, comprising entirely new material and featuring the Grammy Award-winning single "Most High". Following the album's release, they embarked on a second world tour before disbanding at the end of 1998. The band reunited for a final performance in 2001.

== History ==
The initial plans for a reunion were made in 1993, with discussions between the two of collaborating emerging from casual small talk and then an invitation to perform on MTV Unplugged. Music producer Bill Curbishley, who had been managing Plant since the 1980s and who assumed management of Page in 1994, was integral in the reuniting of Page and Plant. Despite failed attempts by others to reunite the pair, Curbishley was able to persuade the previously reluctant Plant into working with Page again. In an interview he gave in 2004, Page recounted the background:

I was going to play in Japan with David [Coverdale], the only time we played live, and I had a call from Robert's management to pop in and see Robert in Boston on the way to LA to rehearse. Robert said, "I've been approached by MTV to do an Unplugged and I'd really like to do it with you," so I said, "Okay." It gave us a chance to revisit some numbers and use that same picture with a very, very different frame.

Plant's recollection of the reunion was as follows:

By that time I didn't feel like I was even a rock singer anymore ... Then I was approached by MTV to do an Unplugged session. But I knew that I couldn't be seen to be holding the flag for the Zeppelin legacy on TV. Then mysteriously Jimmy turned up at a gig I was playing in Boston and it was like those difficult last days of Led Zep had vanished. We had this understanding again without doing or saying anything. We talked about the MTV thing and decided to see where we could take it.

=== MTV Unplugged, No Quarter, and Unledded World Tour (1994–1997) ===
Led Zeppelin's main songwriters reformed on 17 April 1994 as a part of the Alexis Korner Memorial Concert at Buxton, England. On 25 and 26 August they taped performances in London, Wales, and Morocco with Egyptian and Moroccan orchestration of several Led Zeppelin tunes along with four new songs. The performances aired on 12 October, and were so successful that the two coordinated a tour which kicked off in February 1995. The Unplugged performance was released as an album in November 1994 as No Quarter: Jimmy Page and Robert Plant Unledded.

Page and Plant's touring line-up included Charlie Jones on bass and percussion, Michael Lee on drums, plus Pearl Thompson (of The Cure fame, then credited as "Porl Thompson") on guitar and banjo, Najma Akhtar providing backup vocals, Jim Sutherland on mandolin and bodhrán, Nigel Eaton playing the hurdy-gurdy, and Ed Shearmur adding Hammond organ with orchestral arrangements. Page spoke fondly of the lineup, stating:

It was heroic to take something like that around the world, because it was using two orchestras: one Western, one Arab orchestra, with a hurdy-gurdy. It was great going around the world to turn people on to sounds they hadn't heard. It wasn't an easy thing to do, but it was worth it.

The band, joined by keyboardist Phil Andrews, recorded a cover of "Rude World" by Rainer Ptacek for the 1997 charity album The Inner Flame: A Tribute to Rainer Ptacek.

=== Walking into Clarksdale and Walking into Everywhere World Tour (1998) ===
In 1998, Page and Plant entered the studio to record Walking into Clarksdale. The album, recorded and mixed by engineer Steve Albini, featured the single "Most High", which won the Grammy Award for Best Hard Rock Performance. Walking into Clarksdale was certified gold with over 500,000 copies sold. Despite the critical acclaim for "Most High", the album received mixed reviews from critics and was not as commercially successful as 1994's platinum-certified No Quarter. To promote Walking into Clarksdale, Page and Plant embarked on a world tour consisting of 97 tour dates in North America and Europe. Their concert in Bucharest, Romania was professionally filmed and aired live on MTV for the special "Live from the 10 Spot".

=== Dissolution and final performance (1998–2001) ===
After the 1998 supporting tour for Walking into Clarksdale, Robert Plant left to focus on other projects, dissolving the reunion. The pair briefly reunited for a final performance in 2001 at the Montreux Jazz Festival.

In a 2005 interview with Uncut magazine, Plant attributed his decision to dissatisfaction with the production on Walking Into Clarksdale, along with a desire to "get back to playing clubs":

We had some good songs [on Walking into Clarksdale], but I wasn't sure about the production. I felt kind of marooned. We were still surrounded by the protective shield of who we were, and it meant we were playing big arenas around the world. And I realised once again there had to be another way... I knew I had to get back to playing clubs and remember what pulse was all about. To say goodbye to those large arenas that I played with Jimmy was a very purposeful move.

Page later revealed that he had written songs for a follow-up studio album, stating:

There could have been a follow-up [to Walking into Clarksdale]. I certainly had about a dozen numbers written for a third album. Robert heard them and said that some were really good, but he just wanted to go in another direction. That's fair enough.

== Members ==
- Jimmy Page – acoustic and electric guitar, mandolin, production
- Robert Plant – vocals, production
- Charlie Jones – bass, percussion
- Michael Lee – drums, percussion

Additional personnel

- Porl Thompson – guitar, banjo
- Nigel Eaton – hurdy-gurdy
- Ed Shearmur – orchestral arrangements, organ
- Lynton Naiff – string arrangements
- Jim Sutherland – mandolin, bodhran
- Tim Whelan – keyboards
- Phil Andrews – mixing, keyboards
- Martin Meissonnier – pre-production

== Discography ==
Albums

| Year | Album details | Peak chart positions | | | | | | | | | | Certifications (sales thresholds) |
| Year | Album details | US | AUS | AUT | FRA | NLD | NZL | NOR | SWE | SWI | UK | Certifications (sales thresholds) |
|---|---|---|---|---|---|---|---|---|---|---|---|---|
| 1994 | No Quarter: Released: 7 November 1994; Label: Atlantic/Fontana; Format: CD | 4 | 2 | 27 | — | 33 | 13 | — | 10 | 16 | 7 | US: Platinum; CAN 2× Platinum; UK: Gold |
| 1998 | Walking into Clarksdale: Released: 20 April 1998; Label: Atlantic/Mercury; Format: CD | 8 | 16 | 33 | 5 | 56 | 11 | 13 | 17 | 31 | 3 | US: Gold |
"—" denotes releases that did not chart or was not released.

Contributions to compilations

| Year | Name |
|---|---|
| 1997 | The Inner Flame: A Tribute to Rainer Ptacek (Song: "Rude World") |
| 2001 | Good Rockin' Tonight - The Legacy Of Sun Records (Song: "My Bucket's Got a Hole in It") |

Singles

| Year | Name | Album |
|---|---|---|
| 1994 | "Gallows Pole" | No Quarter |
| 1994 | "The Battle of Evermore" (promo) | No Quarter |
| 1994 | "Kashmir" (released in France) | No Quarter |
| 1994 | "Thank You" (released in The Netherlands) | No Quarter |
| 1995 | "Wonderful One" (released in the US) | No Quarter |
| 1995 | "Four Sticks" (promo) | No Quarter |
| 1998 | "Most High" | Walking into Clarksdale |
| 1998 | "Shining in the Light" | Walking into Clarksdale |
| 1998 | "Sons of Freedom" (promo) | Walking into Clarksdale |

Videos

| Year | Name |
|---|---|
| 1998 | Music Video for "Most High" (directed by Floria Sigismondi) |
| 2004 | No Quarter: Jimmy Page and Robert Plant Unledded |

== See also ==
- Coverdale–Page
