= Michael Lee (musician) =

English rock drummer (1969–2008)

- Born: Michael Gary Pearson; 19 November 1969; Darlington, County Durham, England
- Died: 24 November 2008 (aged 39)
- Genres: Rock, hard rock
- Occupation: Musician
- Instruments: Drums; percussion

Michael Lee (born Michael Gary Pearson; 19 November 1969 – 24 November 2008) was an English drummer best known for touring and recording in the 1990s with Jimmy Page and Robert Plant.

== Biography ==
Born in Darlington, Lee started his semi professional career as a drummer with Holosade using the name Damien Lee & recorded the Hellhouse album moving on professionally with Little Angels, a band from Scarborough who became one of the primary British rock acts of the early 1990s. Lee was replaced in Little Angels during their Young Gods tour by Mark Richardson, after it was discovered he had auditioned for the Cult behind their backs. He went on to play the full Ceremony world tour with the Cult in 1991 and 1992.

After playing with the Cult, he would go on to work with Echo & the Bunnymen and the reformed version of Thin Lizzy. Lee also worked with many other bands including Holosade (with whom he received his first album recording credit as "Damian Lee"), Alaska, and Sweet Janes.

Ultimately, it would be his work with Led Zeppelin frontman Robert Plant that garnered him the highest profile. As a result of his work on Plant's solo material, he was invited to continue this collaboration when Plant re-joined forces with Jimmy Page. Lee became the drummer for their touring and recording band, Page and Plant, and received writing credit for all songs on the band's 1998 album Walking into Clarksdale. Lee also toured with Jeff Martin and played drums on Martin's solo album, Exile and the Kingdom. He also co-operated on the 2006 Ian Gillan album, Gillan's Inn.

Similarly to Led Zeppelin's John Bonham, Lee used large drum sizes, something he attributed to his 6'5" height. His bass drum was 26" in diameter, and his snare drum was a brass 14" x 14" shell.

== Death ==
Lee was found dead in his flat on 24 November 2008, having suffered a fatal epileptic seizure. His funeral took place the following week in his hometown of Darlington, and was attended by former bandmates Toby Jepson and Jimmy Page.
