= List of Elektra Records artists =

This is a list of notable artists who have recorded for Elektra Records or any of its subsidiary labels, former or otherwise.

== 0-9 ==
- 1000 Clowns
- 10,000 Maniacs

== A ==
- AC/DC (East West America/Elektra) (outside Australia and New Zealand)
- David Ackles
- Yolanda Adams
- The Adventures
- The Afghan Whigs
- Dean Alexander
- Karen Alexander
- Aimee Allen
- The Amps
- Jon Anderson
- AMM
- Aneka
- Anthrax
- Aphex Twin (Sire/Elektra)
- Ars Nova
- Atomic Rooster
- Audience
- The Avalanches (US/Canada)
- Aztec Two-Step

== B ==
- Bruno Mars
- Badfinger
- Anita Baker
- Bamboo
- The Band Camino
- Beats International
- The Beautiful South
- The Beefeaters
- Bel Canto (Dali/Chameleon/Elektra)
- The Bellamy Brothers (Curb/Elektra)
- Alec Benjamin
- Bendigo Fletcher
- Benzino
- Better Than Ezra
- The Big F
- Big Smo
- Theodore Bikel
- The Black Dog (East West America/Elektra)
- Blindside
- Björk (US/Canada)
- Ruben Blades
- Curt Boettcher
- Karla Bonoff
- Billy Bragg
- Billy Lawrence (East West America/Elektra)
- Brand New Immortals
- Brand Nubian
- Bread
- The Breeders
- Jackson Browne (Asylum/Elektra)
- Brynn Cartelli
- Peabo Bryson
- Lindsey Buckingham (US/Canada)
- Lord Buckley
- Tim Buckley
- Burn Season
- Butterfield Blues Band
- Donald Byrd
- Ryan Beatty

== C ==
- Cafuné
- Hamilton Camp
- The Call
- Brandi Carlile
- The Cars
- Harry Chapin
- Tracy Chapman
- Torrey Carter (The Gold Mind/East West America/Elektra)
- Jackie Chan
- Desmond Child
- Chubb Rock (Select/Elektra)
- Stanley Clarke
- Clear Light
- Clipse (East West America/Elektra)
- Brent Cobb
- Cat Cohen
- Natalie Cole
- Judy Collins
- Josie Cotton
- Crabby Appleton
- The Cure (Fiction/Elektra) (US/Canada)
- Cold Chisel
- Chloe Moriondo
- Christina Perri

== D ==
- Dadawa (Sire/Elektra)
- Dakota Moon
- Damageplan
- Alana Davis
- David Peel
- Deadsy
- Deee-Lite
- Del tha Funkee Homosapien
- Delaney & Bonnie
- Digable Planets (Pendulum/Elektra)
- The Dillards
- Dokken
- The Doors
- Down
- Dream Theater

== E ==
- Eagles (Asylum/Elektra)
- Ernie Earnshaw
- Earth Opera
- Anderson East
- Ebn Ozn
- Eclection
- Terry Ellis (East West America/Elektra)
- Missy Elliott (The Gold Mind/East West America/Elektra)
- Entouch
- En Vogue (East West America/Elektra)
- Epidemic
- Episode Six
- Erasure (Mute/Elektra) (US/Canada/Mexico)
- Espionage
- Ethyl Meatplow (Chameleon/Elektra)

== F ==
- Fabolous
- Faith
- Fally Ipupa
- The Family Stand
- The Farm (All In/New Revolution/Elektra)
- Faster Pussycat
- Fay Ray
- The Fearless Four
- Feeder (North America)
- Finish Ticket
- Fishbone (Hollywood/Elektra)
- Fitz and the Tantrums
- Flipmode Squad
- Jason Falkner
- Lisa Fischer
- Lita Ford
- The Format
- Glenn Frey
- David Frye
- Fun.

== G ==
- Charlotte Gainsbourg (US)
- David Gates
- Crystal Gayle
- The Georgia Satellites
- Gilberto Gil
- Jimmie Dale Gilmore
- Gipsy Kings (Elektra Musician)
- Goodie Mob
- GoodThunder
- Vern Gosdin
- Goudie
- Grandson
- CeeLo Green
- Nanci Griffith
- Grandmaster Flash
- Grand Puba
- Gulliver

== H ==
- Handsome Boy Modeling School
- Happy Mondays (Factory/Elektra) (US)
- Emmylou Harris
- Roy Head
- Howard Hewett
- Sara Hickman
- Nick Hoffman
- Hoodoo Gurus
- Adina Howard (Mecca Don/East West America/Elektra)
- Howard Jones (US)
- The Highwomen
- The Housemartins (US)

== I ==
- Iconz
- Imagination
- Incredible String Band
- INI

== J ==
- Colin James
- Etta James
- Jet (outside Australia/New Zealand)
- Jobriath
- Freedy Johnston
- Howard Jones (US)
- Junior Prom
- Justice (US)
- jxdn (moved to Republic)

== K ==
- Kaleo
- Kane & Abel (Most Wanted/Elektra)
- Kieran Kane
- Ben E. King
- Kid 'N Play (Select/Elektra)
- Greg Kihn (Beserkley/Elektra)
- KMD
- Korgis
- Korn (Roadrunner/Elektra)
- Koerner, Ray & Glover
- K.P. & Envyi (East West America/Elektra)
- Kraftwerk (US)
- Jana Kramer
- Kut Klose (Keia/Elektra)
- Kyuss

== L ==
- Paul Laine
- Avril Lavigne (except Japan)
- Debra Laws
- Leaders of the New School
- Gerald Levert (East West America/Elektra)
- Ryan Lewis
- Huey Lewis and the News
- Lil Mo (The Goldmind/East West America/Elektra)
- The Limelighters
- Lindisfarne (US)
- Little Boots
- Livingston
- Lord Have Mercy
- Lords of the Underground (Pendulum/Elektra)
- Love
- LSG (East West America/Elektra)
- Lucky Boys Confusion
- Loona
- Luna
- Jerry Lee Lewis

== M ==
- Marques Houston
- Man Parrish
- Austin Mahone
- Billie Ray Martin (Sire/Elektra)
- Eric Martin Band (Asylum/Elektra)
- Ziggy Marley
- Marina (679/Elektra) (US)
- Angie Martinez
- Marvelous 3
- Masked Wolf
- MC5
- MC Lyte (First Priority Music/Elektra)
- Mint Condition
- Lila McCann
- Ed McCurdy
- Bobby McFerrin (Elektra Musician)
- Sérgio Mendes
- Natalie Merchant
- Freddie Mercury (Hollywood/Elektra) (US/Canada)
- Metal Church
- Metallica (US/Canada)
- Mindless Self Indulgence
- Mista
- Joni Mitchell
- Moby (Mute/Elektra) (US/Canada)
- Moha La Squale (France)
- Moonpools & Caterpillars
- Laza Morgan
- The Moth & The Flame
- The Mothers
- Mötley Crüe (Mötley Records/Elektra)
- Motograter
- Jason Mraz
- Shirley Murdock

== N ==
- Nada Surf
- Nate Dogg
- NEEDTOBREATHE
- Fred Neil
- Mark Nesler
- New England
- New Rules
- The New Seekers
- Nico

== O ==
- One Ok Rock (Fueled By Ramen/Elektra)
- Phil Ochs
- Omar Rudberg
- The Odds
- Ol' Dirty Bastard
- Old 97's
- Roy Orbison
- Organized Konfusion (Hollywood BASIC/Elektra)
- Orleans (Asylum)
- K.T. Oslin
- Tommy Overstreet

== P ==
- Paramore (Fueled By Ramen/Elektra)
- Pantera (East West America/Elektra)
- Stella Parton
- The Party (Hollywood/Elektra) (US/Canada)
- Tom Paxton
- Teddy Pendergrass
- Pete Rock & CL Smooth
- Phish
- PinkPantheress (Parlophone)
- Pixies (4AD/Elektra) (US)
- The Pandoras
- The Pogues
- Prateek Kuhad
- The Prodigy (US)
- Public Image Ltd. (US/Canada)
- The Plimsouls
- Plainsong

== Q ==
- Quarters of Change
- Queen (US/Canada/Japan/Australia/New Zealand)

== R ==
- Eddie Rabbitt
- Trevor Rabin
- The Rare Occasions
- Rah Digga
- Rainbow Kitten Surprise
- Rampage the Last Boy Scout
- Raw Fusion (Hollywood BASIC/Elektra)
- Ray J (East West America/Elektra)
- Rebekah
- Leon Redbone
- Renaissance (US/Canada)
- Reveille
- Rhinoceros
- Charlie Rich
- Zachary Richard
- RIO
- Jean Ritchie
- Lee Ritenour
- Hargus "Pig" Robbins
- Linda Ronstadt
- Dick Rosmini
- Mark Ronson
- Rogue Male
- The Rubinoos
- Tom Rush
- Patrice Rushen

== S ==
- Sailcat
- Savannah Conley
- Sabicas
- Neil Sedaka
- Sacario
- Masashi Sada
- Saint Motel
- Saint Raymond
- David Sanborn
- Scrawl
- The Screaming Blue Messiahs
- Bob Segarini
- Serafin (US/Canada/Mexico)
- Peter Schilling (US)
- Kevin Sharp
- Ed Sheeran (Asylum/Elektra) (US)
- Karen Clark Sheard
- Shoes
- Paul Siebel
- Semisonic
- Shinehead
- The Shoes
- Silk (Keia/Elektra)
- Simply Red (US)
- Carly Simon
- Nina Simone
- The Sisters of Mercy
- Smashed Gladys
- Phoebe Snow
- Socialburn
- Sonia Dada (Chameleon/Elektra)
- Spacehog (Sire/Elektra)
- Sparks
- Mark Spoelstra
- Spoon
- Staind
- Stalk Forrest Group
- Starpoint
- Steel Pulse
- Stereolab
- Dani Stevenson
- Dave Stewart
- The Stooges
- The Sugarcubes (US/Canada)
- Joe Sun
- Superdrag
- Sturgill Simpson
- Keith Sweat
- Sweetwater
- Sworn Enemy
- Systematic
- SF9 (FNC Entertainment/Elektra)

== T ==
- Tamia
- Tangerine Dream (US)
- Roger Taylor (US/Canada/Japan/Australia/New Zealand)
- Towa Tei
- Television
- 3rd Storee (Yab-Yum/East West America/Elektra)
- Judy Tenuta
- They Might Be Giants
- Third Eye Blind
- Billy Thorpe
- Gina Thompson (The Gold Mind/East West America/Elektra)
- Thrasher Shiver
- Thrush Hermit
- ThxSoMch
- Mel Tillis
- Tones and I (outside Australia/New Zealand)
- Joe Lynn Turner
- Tweet (The Gold Mind/Elektra)
- Conway Twitty
- Twenty One Pilots

== U ==
- Uffie
- The Unforgiven
- Gary Usher
- Utopia (Network/Elektra) (US/Canada)

== V ==
- Dino Valenti
- VAST
- Violent Femmes
- Vonray
- Vitamin C

== W ==
- The Wackers
- Tom Waits
- Chris Walker (Pendulum/Elektra)
- Grover Washington Jr.
- Sadao Watanabe
- Ween
- Josh White
- Womack & Womack
- Nicole Wray (The Gold Mind/East West America/Elektra)
- Hank Williams Jr. (Curb/Elektra)
- White Reaper
- White Trash
- Angela Winbush
- Lucinda Williams (Chameleon/Elektra)
- Charlie Wilson

== X ==
- X

== Y ==
- Year of the Rabbit
- Yello
- Yes (Rhino/Elektra)
- Yo-Yo (East West America/Elektra)
- Young the Giant
- Yngwie J. Malmsteen
- Young Thug (YSL/300/Elektra)

== Z ==
- Warren Zevon (Asylum/Elektra)
- Bailey Zimmerman (Warner Nashville/Elektra)
- John Zorn (Elektra Musician)
- Zero 7 (US Only)
