= Kat Parsons =

American pop singer-songwriter, pianist and guitarist

- Origin: Hyattsville, Maryland, United States
- Genres: Pop, rock
- Occupation: Singer-songwriter
- Instrument(s): Vocals, guitar, piano
- Labels: Cleopatra Records
- Website: www.katparsons.com

Kat Parsons is an American pop singer-songwriter, pianist and guitarist. She has appeared on the cover of Music Connection Magazine, as well as within Billboard, the Washington Post, Campus Circle, the Boston Globe, and the Chicago Sun-Times. She has won a multitude of awards/competitions, including the grand prize in the Acoustic Live Competition in Los Angeles and the GuitarGirls.com Songwriting Contest. She also placed as a semi-finalist in the Pantene Pro Voice contest. Her music has been featured in United Airlines' "Hear it First" programming. Kat was chosen by Ford Motor Company to be a part of the Ford Fusion Studio D national tour. Kat currently resides in Los Angeles, California.

== Early life ==
Kat Parsons was born in Vienna, Austria to parents Darrell and Julie Parsons. Her father was an opera singer at the Vienna State Opera, and her mother, also a professional musician, released a solo album in 1977 titled Piano Lady as well as a vinyl dance single with her group Foxxfire in 1988. Due to Julie's notoriety in Austria, Kat's birth was announced by Kurier, a major Austrian newspaper. Kat's aunt, Patty Parsons, was the lead singer for Marin County based folk rock band AnExchange, and her other aunt Carolyn Campbell toured internationally with the Continental Singers.

At a young age, Kat moved to Hyattsville, Maryland, United States and spent much of her youth there. Often in her youth, Kat would sing as part of a quartet with her parents and her brother Jon. After graduating high school, Kat attended Northwestern University in Illinois where she earned a degree in theatre.

== Music career ==
Kat released her debut album Framing Caroline on Chicago, Illinois based Waterdog Records in May 1999. The album was produced by Ralph Covert, lead singer of Chicago-based indie rock band the Bad Examples. Online music publication Celebrity Cafe awarded the release "album of the day" for December 17, 1999.

To finance the production of her next album, Kat Parsons reached out to her fanbase, offering various rewards for fan donations. With fan support, she secured the money necessary to record and release 2005's No Will Power, which was distributed by Cleopatra Records. The album was produced by Paul Maylone and Geza X, and features performances by musicians who have recorded and toured with Sarah McLachlan, Liz Phair, John Mayer, Steve Vai and Junkie XL. Thematically, Kat has stated that the album "chronicles the unraveling of a romantic relationship at its every stage."

The album was well received critically and garnered various accolades. Online music seller CD Baby featured the album as one of its "Front Page Editor's Picks". CD Baby founder Derek Sivers called the album "one of the best [he's] ever heard." The album also received positive reviews from Allmusic.com, Collected Sounds, and Indie Music Magazine, among other publications. The song "Go Find Her" was a finalist in the Pop/Top 40 category of the 2005 International Songwriting Competition.

No Will Power was a runner up in the "album of the year" contest at the 2005 DIY Music Festival, and she was asked to speak on a panel at the affiliated DIY Convention in 2006, alongside other figures in the world of independent music including musician/engineer Chris Vrenna and Derek Sivers, the founder of CD Baby.

The song "Miss Me" was chosen by One Way Magazine to be included in their issue 13 CD sampler alongside artists such as Pat Metheny, Marianne Faithfull, and Aqualung.

Also in 2005, Kat recorded a cover of Cher's "If I Could Turn Back Time" with Jennifer Batten. The song was produced by Grammy Award winning producer Bob Kulick, and was featured on a compilation of Cher covers called An All Star Tribute to Cher which also included contributions by Lisa Loeb, Cherie Currie, and Sheila E.

=== Upcoming Releases ===
Kat Parsons has confirmed that she will be releasing three new EPs in 2012, and launched a successful campaign on threshold pledge system website Kickstarter to finance the recording and release of the EPs. The first, titled Talk To Me, was produced by Warren Huart will be released on April 3, 2012. One song from the EP, "Fall For It", was co-written with Travis Howard, known for co-writing songs with Miranda Lambert. It was chosen as a semi-finalist for the 2011 International Songwriting Competition in the Pop/Top 40 category. Another future release includes a song co-written by Matt Miller of the band Graydon. Kat also recently recorded a song with well-known songwriter and record producer T Bone Burnett, which has not yet been officially released.

In 2010, Ourstage held a competition to have a song produced by Mike Flynn of Epic Records, known for production work with well-known artists including the Fray and Sara Bareilles. Out of 1,408 entries, Kat won, and had the opportunity to have a song recorded and produced by Flynn, which will be featured on a future release.

== Live performance ==
Kat Parsons is known for her dramatic and emotional live performances, which have been critically praised. In live reviews, John Clarkson of Penny Black Music called her singing style "acrobatic and feisty" and Patrick Foster of the Washington Post stated that while performing live, "her songs possess a fiery folk-rock spirit." In the March 2004 issue of Music Connection magazine, reviewer Scott Perham described her as an "artist who sings straight from the heart." Kat has toured with or performed on stage with well-known artists including Billy Corgan, Sara Bareilles, Maria Muldaur, Jim White Dave Mason, Jonatha Brooke, Lori McKenna, Shannon McNally, the Fixx, the Knack, Ryan Cabrera and Charlotte Martin. She has toured internationally based on the strength of her live performances, including dates and residencies in Europe, Japan, Thailand, Vietnam, Singapore, Malaysia, Brunei, Australia, India, South Korea, Canada, Mexico and Puerto Rico.

In the early 2000s, Kat toured the United Kingdom as a backing vocalist for singer-songwriter Doug Hoekstra. In reviewing one of these performances, Triste Magazine journalist Steve Wilcock noted that Kat's voice "provided the soul and grit needed" for Doug's bluesier songs.

== In Media ==
As a musical artist, Kat has been endorsed by several musical instrument & audio manufacturers, including Yamaha, AUDIX, and Parker Guitars. Yamaha currently feature her on their website and consider her an "influential emerging artist".

=== Film, Television and Radio ===
Kat Parsons was featured in the MTV series Score, in which she performed a song specially written for the show in front of a live studio audience. Kat and her band also appear in an episode of the Food Network series FoodNation with Bobby Flay. She was featured in a television commercial directed by Mark Goffman for Baldwin Piano Company/Gibson in which she can be seen singing and playing piano. Her music has also showed up in several television series, including Style Network's Giuliana and Bill, VH1's Audrina and Venice: The Series. She has performed live on several talk shows and morning shows, including KTVK's Good Morning Arizona and Chicago's WGN Morning News.

Kat's music has been played on many radio stations, including KCRW in Santa Monica, WBEZ in Chicago, WRNR-FM in Maryland, and KLOS in Los Angeles. Her songs reached the top of the "most played" charts for XM Satellite Radio's UnSigned station (now called The Verge).

== Discography ==
Albums
Title	Album details
Framing Caroline	Released: 1999; Label: Waterdog Records
No Will Power	Released: March 29, 2005; Distribution: Cleopatra Records

EPs
Title	Album details
Kat Parsons	Released: 2002; Self-released
Talk to Me	Released: April 3, 2012; Self-released

Compilation Appearances
Title	Album details
Niteskool Project 1999	Released: May 1999; Label: Niteskool Productions
Songwriters Cafe Volume 1	Released: October 2000; Label: Yew Tree Records
Trunkstock: Artist Sampler Volume 1	Released: November 2000; Label: Trunkstock Music Group
An All Star Tribute to Cher	Released: 2005; Label: Cleopatra Records
An Extraordinary Tribute to Fiona Apple	Released: 2006; Label: Tributized Records
Abrazos 2007	Released: 2007; Label: Full Forward Records
Songs for Haiti	Released: 2010; Label: For Lenore Music

Vocal Contributions
Title	Album details
Drinking from the Water Clock by Rebecca's Statue	Released: October 2000; Label: Livin' Live Records
Around the Margins by Doug Hoekstra	Released: March 2001; Label: Inbetweens
Doug Hoekstra Combo Live at Sal's Music Emporium by Doug Hoekstra	Released: May 2001; Label: Hinah
Coming Home by Chuck Cheesman	Released: 2001; Label: Chuck Cheesman
Beyond the Foggy Highway by Chris Opperman	Released: 2005; Label: Purple Cow Records
The Lionheart by Chris Opperman	Released: 2010; Label: Purple Cow Records
Graydon by Graydon	Released: 2010; Label: Graydon
A Musical Journey of Christmas Classics by The Three Jazz Men	Released: 2010; Label: Man Alive Music Productions
