= Butts Band =

Rock band

- Origin: London, England
- Genre: Rock
- Years active: 1973–1975
- Past members: John Densmore; Robby Krieger; Phil Chen; Roy Davies; Jess Roden; Mick Weaver; Mike Berkowitz; Alex Richman; Karl Ruckner; Michael Stull; David Paul Campbell

Butts Band was a British and American group formed by ex-Doors members John Densmore and Robby Krieger, active from 1973 to 1975. The band released two albums and, with the exception of Krieger and Densmore, they consisted of different band personnel on each.

== History ==
Butts Band came about as a consequence of the Doors trying to find a replacement for lead singer Jim Morrison, who had died in July 1971. The three remaining Doors had released two albums (Other Voices in 1971 and Full Circle in 1972), with Ray Manzarek and Krieger sharing vocals. Unable to recruit a singer in the US, the three Doors went to London in 1973 seeking an experienced lead singer and auditioned several British singers, including Howard Werth (the singer of Audience), Kevin Coyne (from Siren) and Jess Roden (who was the leader of Bronco).

Werth rehearsed with the band for a week. Elektra Records founder Jac Holzman favoured Werth to replace Morrison, as he had at one stage foreseen Audience taking over the Doors' spot on Elektra, but Audience had disbanded and Holzman now envisioned Werth and the Doors merging as the "new Doors". However, the three remaining Doors felt that adding a new singer was not working out and decided to disband. With Manzarek returning to Los Angeles, Krieger and Densmore began looking for a new project, linking up with Roden, Phil Chen and Roy Davies to form the Butts Band (allegedly named after a cave where Roden's previous band used to practice).

The band signed with Blue Thumb Records and began working on their first album, with longtime Doors sound engineer/co-producer Bruce Botnick taking the producer role. Recording was split between studios in London (three weeks at Olympic Studios) and Kingston, Jamaica (for another three weeks) on their way home to California. Their self-titled debut album was released in 1973. Krieger was quoted as saying, "It's not 'head music', it's 'heart music'. It's 'up music'. It's music you can dance to."

Following the album's release, the band appeared on The Midnight Special and the Old Grey Whistle Test. Following the pressure of having two members living in California and three in London, this incarnation of the band split up. The former British musicians were replaced by musicians from the Los Angeles area: Michael Stull (guitar/piano), Alex Richman (keyboards), Karl Rucker (bass), Bobbi Hall (congas) and an additional drummer, Mike Berkowitz. This line-up released Hear and Now in 1975.

The Butts Band permanently disbanded after the second album, with Krieger and Densmore embarking on solo projects. In 1978, the three remaining Doors reunited for the first time to record An American Prayer.

== Former members ==
- John Densmore – drums (1973–1975)
- Robby Krieger – lead guitar (1973–1975)
- Phil Chen – bass, rhythm guitar (1973–1974; died 2021)
- Roy Davies – keyboards, synthesisers (1973–1974; died 1986)
- Jess Roden – vocals, rhythm guitar (1973–1974)
- Mick Weaver – organ (1973–1974)
- Mike Berkowitz – drums (1974–1975)
- Alex Richman – keyboards, vocals (1974–1975)
- Karl Rucker – bass (1974–1975)
- Michael Stull – vocals, rhythm guitar, piano (1974–1975; died 2002)
- David Paul Campbell – keyboards, vocals (1975)

== Discography ==
- Butts Band (1973)
- Hear and Now (1975)
