= A Band Called O =

English rock band (1970–1977)

- Also known as: The Parlour Band; The O Band
- Origin: Jersey, Channel Islands
- Genres: Progressive rock, soft rock, disco
- Years active: 1970–1977
- Labels: Deram; CBS/Epic; United Artists; Major League Productions
- Spinoff of: Climax Blues Band; The Alan Bown Set; Charlie Dore; Bram Tchaikovsky
- Past members: Mark Anders; Craig Anders; Peter Filleul; Jon "Pix" Pickford; Jerry Robins; Derek Ballard; Jeff Bannister
- Website: http://abandcalledo.boards.net/

A Band Called O was a band from Jersey, Channel Islands. Originally known as The Parlour Band, playing progressive rock, they renamed to A Band Called O for two albums on CBS/Epic and later to The O Band for further albums with UA. Despite issuing five albums, on three major labels, and being championed by John Peel, for whom they recorded four Peel Sessions, they had no chart success; but were a popular live act, who toured Britain and Europe. Derek Ballard is now retired and lives with his wife in Bremen, Germany.

== The Parlour Band ==
Formed in Jersey, Channel Islands, circa 1970, as 'The Parlour Band', the early 1970 line-up comprised founding member Peter Filleul (keyboards and vocals) formerly of the Climax Blues Band , with Mike Harwood (lead guitar and vocals) Allen Greenall (acoustic guitar and vocals) Nigel Uren (Drums) John Ashworth (Bass guitar) later replaced by Jeff Smith (Bass and vocals) the last 4 members were replaced in late 1970 by brothers Mark Anders (bass and vocals) and Craig Anders (lead guitar and vocals) Jon "Pix" Pickford (guitar and vocals) and Jerry Robins (drums). Released in 1972, The Parlour Band's only album Is a Friend?, was produced by Nick Tauber in a melodic progressive rock style, sounding like a "more mainstream, less art-rock-inclined Yes" with strong keyboard and guitar parts. The Parlour Band toured supporting Caravan and Steve Hillage's Khan.

They relocated from Jersey to Leicester, changed their name to 'A Band Called O', and their drummer to Derek Ballard. This line-up released their first album on the Epic label, produced by Ben Sidran of the Steve Miller Band, and Chris White of The Zombies. A Band Called O (1974) and, despite being an album orientated band, a single "Rock and Roll Clown" / "Red Light Mama Red Hot" was released in Germany while they recorded the first of four Peel Sessions on 24 September 1974. They recorded their second Peel Session on 18 March 1975, before touring with Man and John Cipollina. Later that year, they released their second album, Oasis. They had one track "There Ain't Nothing I Wouldn't Do" on a single to promote their tour with Sassafras and Randy Pie as the 'Hot on the Tracks' package.

Filleul left and was replaced by Ian Lynne, after about 6 months he was also replaced by Jeff Bannister, formerly with the John Barry Seven, The Alan Bown Set and Jess Roden's Bronco.

== The O Band ==
The band changed label from CBS/Epic to United Artists, and played their third Peel Session on 23 March 1976 (the BBC credit all the Peel sessions to A Band Called O, although one or two were after the name change). Musically, their style had already evolved from progressive rock to soft-rock, but it then moved towards a pop style. They changed their name to 'The O Band' and released their third album Within Reach later that year. A promotional single "Excerpts from Within Reach" was issued in the UK whilst two singles were taken from the album: "A Smile Is Diamond" / "Coasting" was issued in Germany, and "Don't Cha Wanna" / "Coasting" in the UK. They played their fourth and final Peel Session on 22 February 1977.

Also in 1977 they released a 12" EP Look to the Left, Look to the Right, before recording their final album The Knife, from which the single "Almost Saturday Night" / "Love Ain't a Keeper" was taken. Shortly before a planned change of management, Pix Pickford decided to leave for a solo career. The O Band later disbanded at the end of 1977.

On the Road 1975-77 was released in June 2012 on CD (78 minutes) and as a download (118 minutes). Strangely, for a band known for its live performances, "this is the only live material ever released by the band".

== Unrelated O-Band ==
Since 2008 the name "The O Band" has been used by an unrelated Jazz, Hip-Hop, R&B and Gospel band from Norfolk, Virginia.

There is also music band from Ukraine called Band O (Гурт О)

== Subsequent careers ==
- Craig Anders later played with Alan Ross and Charlie Dore.
- Mark Anders now runs Bug Music.
- Derek Ballard went on to work with Razar, Charlie Dore, Bram Tchaikovsky and John Watts. In 1982 he moved to Germany and works in Berlin as a session musician and photographer.
- Filleul rejoined the Climax Blues Band and later became a session musician recording with numerous artists including, Loudon Wainwright III, The Blues Band and Richard Thompson, adding composing, mixing and production work to his keyboard playing.
- Pix Pickford had a brief solo career, releasing two singles: "Long Drop" and "Are you Rockin'", before moving to Spain to play with 'Racket' comprising Pickford, Nik Ramsey and Arturo Tore. Later, after a personnel change the band became 'Guiri', which saw Tore being replaced by Nigel Barrett on bass/vocals and for a while included Mike Smith on guitar and Blue Weaver on piano and keyboards. After Weaver and Smith's departure, Stefan Wickenden joined the band on guitar/vocals and this continued to be the line-up. Pickford lived in Torre del Mar, and was found dead in Spain, in September 2021, after going missing on 29 August following a meal with friends.
- Jeff Bannister played with Charlie Dore, on Raphael Ravenscroft's Her Father Didn't Like Me Anyway (1979), and Joan Jett's Bad Reputation (1980).

== Discography ==
=== Albums ===
As The Parlour Band

- 1972: Is a Friend (Decca/Deram Records SDL 10 / CD: 2010, Esoteric Eclec 2192)

As A Band Called O

- 1974: A Band Called O (CBS/Epic EPC 80120) UK
- 1975: Oasis (CBS/Epic EPC 80596) UK
- 2012 On the Road 1975-77 (Major League Productions (MLP) MLP21CD) UK

As The O Band

- 1976, Within Reach (United Artists UAS 29942 / CD: 1994, Repertoire RR4419) + Bonus tracks (2002)
- 1977: The Knife (United Artists UP36276 UK / CD: 1994 Repertoire RR442, Germany / CD: 2006 Repertoire)

=== Singles ===
As A Band Called O

- 1974: "Rock & Roll Clown" / "Red Light Mama Red Hot" (Epic EPCS 2677) Germany
- 1974: "There Ain't Nothing I Wouldn't Do" (1Epic HOT 1 UK) (Concert promo with Sassafras & Randy Pie)
- 1974: "No Manners" / "That's Up" (Epic SEPC 2721) UK

As The O Band

- 1976: "Excerpts from Within Reach" (United Artists UA-PROMO 1) UK
- 1976: "A Smile Is Diamond" / "Coasting" (United Artists 36108AT) Germany
- 1976: "Don't Cha Wanna" / "Coasting" (United Artists UP36108) UK
- 1977: "Look to the Left" / "A Smile Is Diamond" (United Artists UP36297) UK
- 1977: "Look to the Left" / "A Smile Is Diamond" / "Fine White Wine(live)" (12" red vinyl) (United Artists 12-UP36297) UK
- 1977: "Almost Saturday Night" / "Love Ain't a Keeper" (United Artists UP36276) UK
