= It's All Up to You =

Single by Jim Capaldi

from the album Short Cut Draw Blood
- B-side: "Whale Meat Again"
- Released: 1974
- Genre: Soft rock
- Length: 4:11
- Label: Island
- Songwriter: Jim Capaldi
- Producer: Jim Capaldi

Jim Capaldi singles chronology
"Tricky Dicky Rides Again" (1973)	"It's All Up to You" (1974)	"It's All Right" (1975)

"It's All Up to You" is a song by British musician Jim Capaldi. It was released as a single in 1974, and became his first of only two hit singles in his native UK, peaking at No. 27. His other UK hit is the No. 4 cover of the Everly Brothers song "Love Hurts", released the following year. Both songs appear on his 1975 album, Short Cut Draw Blood.

== Track listing ==
UK 7" single
A. "It's All Up to You"
B. "Whale Meat Again"

== Musicians ==
- Jim Capaldi - drums, vocals, percussion
- Jess Roden - guitar
- John "Rabbit" Bundrick - piano, clavinet
- Phil Chen - bass
- Harry Robinson - string arrangement
