= Linklog =

A linklog is a type of blog which primarily contains links to other websites. Common practice is for the post titles to link directly to an external URL, and the content of the post includes information to complement the associated URL.

Linklogs existed as a feature of computing systems before the internet as well. In distributed file systems a link log was a method of recording data in which a record is created and added to the proper log when updating a transaction. The format of a log record closely matches the specification of the transaction type it corresponds to. Link log records consisted of two parts in such a system: a set of type-independent fields, and a set of type-specific fields. The former set consists of pointers to the preceding and succeeding records of the log.

In PBX systems such as AUDIX, link-logs were a collection of data collecting to assist operators in maintaining the system.

== Linklog software ==
- Betula - A self-hosted single-user bookmarking software integrated with the Fediverse.
- Linkwalla - A lightweight link blogging engine
- Delicious - A defunct social bookmarking web service

== See also ==
- Social bookmarking
- Microblogging
