= Jack Schaeffer =

American musician (born 1946)

- Born: John Case Schaeffer II; March 19, 1946 (age 80)
- Origin: Los Angeles, California, United States
- Occupations: Saxophone player; singer; inventor; author
- Instrument: Saxophone
- Formerly of: Royale Monarchs

Jack Schaeffer (born March 19, 1946, in Los Angeles, California) is an American musician. He invented a musical instrument, the Strumbola.

== Discography ==
Royale Monarchs

- Whole Lot Of Shakin Going On (1962) (Dell)
- Sombrero Stomp (1962) (Dell)
- My Babe (1964) (Dell)
- (Hey) Surfs Up (1964) (Dell)
- Great Balls Of Fire (1964) (Dell)
- Teen Scene (1964) (Dell)
- The Cinnamon Cinder Show / Bob Eubanks (1963–65) (TV)
- Cinnamon Cinder Show Christmas Special (1965) (TV)

Collector Compilation LPs and CDs Containing Tracks

- At The Rockhouse, vol. 11 (Eagle)
- Red Hot Rock 'N' Roll (Red Hot)
- High School Favorites (Teen)
- I Want Rock (White Label)

Forte' Four

- Can't You See I'm Trying (1966) (Decca)
- Don't Let The Sun Shine On Me (1966) (Decca)
- I Don't Wanna Say Goodnight (1966) (Decca)
- The Climb (1966) (Decca)
- Viva Las Vegas, Original Soundtrack / "The Climb" (1964) (MGM)
- The Cool Ones, Original Soundtrack (1967) (Warner Bros)

AnExchange

- Evening of AnExchange (1972)
- Edmonton International Pop Festival (1974)

The Wackers

- Wackering Heights (1971) (Electra) CD Release (2006)
- Shredder (1973) (Electra) CD Release (2006)

Hot House Swing Band

- L.A. Confidential, Original Soundtrack (1997) (Warner Bros)
- Hello Palm Springs (1998) (DVD)
- Got Rhythm? (2000) (CD)

Producer/Arranger

- The Climb (1966) Songwriter
- Marin (1970) Arranger
- Evening of AnExchange (1972) Arranger
- Why Can't I ? Patty Parsons (1979) Producer & Arranger
- Ron Butler and the Saxist; Go Figure ! (1982) Producer & Arranger

Various

- Faith of Our Children (1953–55) (NBC) Eleanor Powell
- Dateline: Disneyland (1955) (ABC) The Phil Moore Band
- Dodge "White Hat" (1962) ( TV commercial) The Phil Moore Band
- The Steve Allen Playhouse (1963) (ABC) The Phil Moore Band
- Spartan Choir (1963) (KFI Radio)
- Spartan Choir (1963) (LP)
- The People's Lawyer (1975) (TV)
- My Father's Hands (2003) (CD) Dan Anthony
- Watercolor Dreams (2007) (CD) Dan Anthony
