= Roger Stafford =

Roger Stafford may refer to:

- Roger Stafford (musician), member of the Royale Monarchs
- Roger Dale Stafford (1951–1995), convicted spree killer and serial killer
- Roger Stafford, 6th Baron Stafford (1572–1640)
