= Ralph's World =

US musical group

- Origin: Chicago, Illinois, United States
- Genres: Children's music, kindie rock
- Years active: 1991–present
- Labels: Waterdog, Mini Fresh, Disney Sound
- Members: Ralph Covert; Tom O'Brien; Brian Sheridan; Michael Alban; Chris "Bean" Weng
- Website: ralphsworld.com

Ralph's World is a children's music group created by Ralph Covert, previously of Chicago-based indie-rock group the Bad Examples. Covert uses high rock and roll energy with kid-friendly lyrics.

Ralph's World's Green Gorilla, Monster & Me was nominated for Best Musical Album for Children, at the 48th Grammy Awards.

A collection of lyrics and artwork titled Ralph's World Rocks was released in August 2008 from Henry Holt Books for Young Readers.

"At the Bottom of the Sea" is likely the most well known song by Ralph's World, due to it being included on RCA Lyra mp3 players in the early 2000s.

== Studio albums ==
- Ralph's World (2001)
- At the Bottom of the Sea (2002)
- Happy Lemons (2002)
- Peggy's Pie Parlor (2003)
- The Amazing Adventures of Kid Astro (2004)
- Green Gorilla, Monster & Me (2005)
- The Rhyming Circus (2008)
- All Around Ralph’s World (2010)
- Time Machine Guitar (2017)
- RWd10 (2021)
- RWdChristmas11 (2021)
