= The Alan Bown Set =

British band (1965–1972)

- Also known as: The Alan Bown! Alan Bown
- Origin: London, England
- Genres: Jazz; freakbeat; blues; soul; R&B; psychedelia; progressive rock
- Years active: 1965–1972
- Labels: Deram; Island; CBS; United Artists
- Past members: Alan Bown; Jeff Bannister; Dave Green; Stan Haldane; John Helliwell; Jess Roden; Tony Catchpole; Robert Palmer; Gordon Neville; Andy Brown; Mel Collins; Dougie Thomson; Derek Griffiths; Dave Lawson; Tony Dangerfield; Frank White; Alan Coulter; Nick Payn; Pete Goodall

The Alan Bown Set, later known as The Alan Bown! or just Alan Bown, were a British band of the 1960s and 1970s whose music evolved from jazz and blues through soul and rhythm and blues and ended up as psychedelia and progressive rock. The band achieved limited chart success and is best known for the role it played in developing the careers of numerous musicians including Mel Collins, John Helliwell, Robert Palmer, Jess Roden and Dougie Thomson.

== Formation ==
Alan Bown (born Alan James Bown, 21 July 1942, Slough, Berkshire died 16 December 2014, Slough), a trumpet player, joined The Embers in 1963, when he left the RAF. This group played both jazz and American rhythm and blues, and were a successful live act, playing at venues like The Star-Club, Hamburg at the same time as The Beatles. Bown left the group to join The John Barry Seven, who were backing Brenda Lee, and toured and recorded with the band until it broke up in 1965; Barry made Bown the leader of the touring band, so he could spend more time composing.

== Reformation ==
Bown formed The Alan Bown Set around May 1965, initially with three former members of The John Barry Seven—Jeff Bannister (lead vocals and organ) (born Jeffrey Bannister, 7 January 1943), Dave Green (sax, clarinet and flute) and Stan Haldane (bass)—together with Pete Burgess (guitar) and Vic Sweeney (drums). They played American R&B and soul and played the same club circuit as Georgie Fame and the Blue Flames and Cliff Bennett and the Rebel Rousers. In 1965 Tony Hatch signed to them to Pye Records but their first single, "Can't Let Her Go" / "I'm The One", did not chart. In 1966 Green was replaced by John Helliwell and shortly after Jess Roden joined as a vocalist, allowing Bannister to concentrate on keyboards. They appeared on Ready Steady Go! and at The Windsor Jazz Festival and began headlining London's Marquee Club.

This line-up released three singles, none of which charted, although "Emergency 999" later became a Northern Soul club anthem. The Alan Bown Set and Jimmy James and the Vagabonds were both recorded live and released on a joint album, London Swings: Live at the Marquee Club, with one side each. In November 1966 Burgess was replaced by Tony Catchpole and in 1967 the band released "Gonna Fix You Good (Everytime You're Bad)" / "I Really, Really Care" and recorded the soundtrack for Jeu de Massacre, a French film featuring Jacques Loussier. They recorded for the BBC's Rhythm and Blues programme in 1966 and Saturday Club in 1967.

== The Alan Bown! ==
When the band's Pye Records contract expired in 1967, Bown reformed the band as "The Alan Bown!" a psychedelic band on Verve Records, They finally released their first full album Outward Bown in 1968 and appeared on Top Gear. The album included a cover of Dylan's "All Along the Watchtower", a stage version which "directly inspired Hendrix's arrangement of the song". In 1968 they performed "We Can Help You" on Top of the Pops; this was at No 26 in the UK chart but the pressing plant went on strike, so they could not capitalise on the exposure.

In 1969 they changed to Deram Records, where they had a minor hit with "Still as Stone". As with many bands at the time, they recorded cover versions for the BBC, appearing on the '’Jimmy Young Show'’, "The David Symonds Show" and others, as restricted needle time required "live" performances between the records. Their next album, The Alan Bown!, had been recorded when Roden left the band. Robert Palmer joined and re-recorded the vocals before the album's UK release, although the Roden vocals were issued in the US (and has never been reissued). The band appeared on BBC TV's Disco Two (which became The Old Grey Whistle Test).

In 1970 the band changed labels again, to Island Records. They recorded the album Listen, but Palmer promptly left, being replaced by Gordon Neville, who re-recorded the vocals before the album was eventually released. The single "Pyramid" was released before Andy Brown replaced Haldane and Mel Collins joined on saxophone. They recorded another album, Stretching Out, and re-appeared on Disco Two. Bannister left but was not replaced, then Dougie Thomson replaced Brown and Derek Griffiths, formerly with The Artwoods, replaced Catchpole. This line-up continued until February 1972. Bown then formed a new band with Dave Lawson (keyboards), Tony Dangerfield (bass) and Frank White (guitar) replaced by Pete Goodall, formerly with Thunderclap Newman, Nick Payn (tenor saxophone and flute) and Alan Coulter (drums), but after a major tour, Bown finally disbanded the group in July 1972.

The song "Technicolour Dream" was included in the 2025 film Silent Night, Deadly Night.

== Subsequent careers ==
- Bown joined Jonesy, and then became an A&R manager with CBS Records.
- Jeff Bannister joined A Band Called O.
- Mel Collins worked with King Crimson, Alexis Korner and numerous other bands.
- John Helliwell and Dougie Thomson joined Supertramp.
- Gordon Neville later joined Elton John's band, and worked with Rick Wakeman.
- Robert Palmer joined Dada, which evolved into Vinegar Joe, and then had a successful solo career and formed Power Station.
- Jess Roden formed his own band Bronco.
- Vic Sweeney worked with Kevin Coyne.
- Pete Goodall worked with Percy Sledge, Viola Wills, Carl Douglas and many more.
- Nick Payn played in Bill Wyman's Rhythm Kings.
- Dave Lawson joined/co-founded Greenslade, with whom he played until their break-up in late 1975.

== Discography ==
Singles

- "Can't Let Her Go" / "I'm the One" (1966) Pye
- "Baby Don't Push Me" / "Everything's Gonna Be Alright" (1966) Pye
- "Headline News" / "Mister Pleasure" (1966) Pye – UK No. 52 (Note: Chart position is from the official UK "Breakers List".)
- "Emergency 999" / "Settle Down" (1966) Pye
- "Gonna Fix You Good (Everytime You're Bad)" / "I Really, Really Care" (1967) Pye
- "Jeu De Massacre" (1967) Disques Vogue
- "We Can Help You" / "Magic Handkerchief" (1967) Music Factory – UK No. 55
- "Toyland" / "Technicolour Dream" (1967) MGM – UK No. 53, No. 94 US (Cashbox)
- "Story Book" / "Little Lesley" (1968) MGM
- "Still As Stone" / "Wrong Idea" (1969) Deram
- "Gypsy Girl" / "All I Can" (1969) Deram
- "Pyramid" / "Crash Landing" (1971) Island
- "Rockford Files" /"I Don't Know" (1975) CBS

Albums

- London Swings: Live at the Marquee Club (1966) Pye (1 side) (1994) Castle (CD)
- Outward Bown (November 1968) Music Factory
- The Alan Bown! (February 1970) Deram (US featured Jess Roden's vocals; UK and subsequent reissues featured Robert Palmer's vocals)
- Listen (November 1970) Island
- Stretching Out (August 1971) Island

Compilations

- Kick Me Out (1985) See for Miles
- Emergency 999 (2002) Sequel

This discography was compiled from several sources, but there are a number of inconsistencies.

== Bibliography ==
The Alan Bown Set – Before and Beyond by Jeff Bannister, published by Banland Publishing Ltd
