= Peter Parcek =

American singer

- Born: Middletown, Connecticut, United States
- Genres: Blues rock
- Occupations: Guitarist, singer, songwriter
- Instruments: Guitar, vocals
- Years active: Late 1960s–present
- Website: Official website

Peter Parcek is an American blues rock guitarist, singer, and songwriter. In 2021, Parcek's album, Mississippi Suitcase was nominated for a Blues Music Award in the 'Blues Rock Album' category. Parcek has released four albums since 2000, after spending time as a sideman for Pinetop Perkins. Buddy Guy once opined about Parcek, "You're as bad as Eric Clapton. And I know Eric Clapton."

In his career, Parcek has been the opening act for other artists who include Roy Buchanan, Son Seals, Susan Tedeschi, Lazy Lester, Joanna Connor, and others.

== Life and career ==
Parcek was born in Middletown, Connecticut, United States. He first became aware of blues music by listening to WVON AM radio in the evening, when Southern radio station signals barely reached his bedroom in New England. He heard music by Muddy Waters, Howlin' Wolf, Albert Collins, and others, before his mother amassed sufficient Green Stamps to purchase her son a nylon-string guitar. Intent listening and a passion for the music enabled Parcek to self-teach himself both the harmonica and guitar. In the early 1960s, Parcek was fortunate to relocate to England, and it became a life-changing period for him in terms of musical development. The British blues scene was blossoming and Parcek was able to witness shows by Eric Clapton, Jeff Beck and Peter Green, the latter of whom had a major impact in forming Parcek's guitar style. Suitably inspired, in the late-1960s, Parcek began performing his own small-scale gigs in and around London, both playing the harmonica and singing. Eventually though, when his lack of a British work permit was discovered by the authorities, he was forced to return to the States.

Upon resettling, Parcek continued his study of major blues artists in live shows, many of them at the 1970s Shaboo Inn near Willimantic, Connecticut. These included multiple performances from Buddy Guy, and shows from Matt "Guitar" Murphy with the James Cotton Band, Albert Collins, Freddie King, Roy Buchanan, Muddy Waters, Skip James, Albert King and B.B. King. Parcek later stated "I would sit as close as possible so I could see exactly what they were doing on the guitar. It was an amazing education." He relocated from Middletown to Boston, Massachusetts, and began to hone his guitar playing skills, by practicing up to 10 hours a day. He worked during the day as a school counselor and instrument salesman, before joining a Boston-based blues outfit, Nine Below Zero (not the British band of the same name). In the 1990s, Parcek became the guitarist in Pinetop Perkins backing ensemble.

In 2000, Parcek released his now out-of-print debut album, Evolution, on Lightnin' Records. He was joined by guest appearances from Ronnie Earl and Al Kooper, helping to create a mixture of Parcek original songs with his interpretation of those written by Mose Allison and Freddie King. After a decade of performing locally and taking some session work, Parcek issued The Mathematics of Love. Michael G. Nastos of AllMusic noted "His sparse instrumental backdrop seduces you, while the vocal content of his songs about life and living reels you in further. His singing and overall approach are very reminiscent of latter-period Charlie Musselwhite, a balance of underground and mystery within roots music territory". Al Kooper made his second appearance on a Parcek album, specifically on the instrumental re-imagining of the Harlan Howard penned, "Busted." In a style of his own, Parcek described his music 'soul guitar', a fusion of blues, gypsy-style jazz, rock, funk, and shades of country. He toured to promote the album and, the following year, released an EP of four Bob Dylan covers, Pledging My Time. A reviewer in Real Gone wrote, "Parcek and his band must be applauded for twisting these four Dylan songs into brilliantly atmospheric, blues-edged workouts that captivate the listener."

His next release was Everybody Wants to Go to Heaven (2017). It was conceived in the grieving period after the death of Parcek's mother and is a mix of originals and covers. "Every Drop of Rain" was written in honor of her, while "Ashes to Ashes" was inspired by Michelangelo. Parcek reflected this deeply emotional period with raw, viscerating guitar lines and emotive vocals, beginning with the Peter Green-penned track, "The World Keep on Turning." Parcek embellished the sound with a handful of effects. For example, "See That My Grave Is Kept Clean" utilized a couple of record producer/drummer Marco Giovino's percussion loops and a single guitar. Parcek stated "I needed to give listeners a breath—something fun... So that's where some of the instrumentals came from. 'Shiver' is basically an homage to Albert Collins. 'Pat Hare'... is a tribute to him." The album was partly recorded in Nashville, Tennessee and another studio close to Parcek's Boston home. The album featured the blues guitarist Luther Dickinson of the North Mississippi Allstars on four tracks. A writer in the independent music magazine, Making a Scene!, wrote, "This is the hard blues. It's not that Peter Parcek plays hard constantly but it's the feeling he evokes. He alternates dynamics but leaves vapors of Hendrix and The Cream in his wake. He can play cleanly like Peter Green but prefers to shroud both his guitar sound and vocals with a haunting, voodoo shear. The album was cited in best of year lists by Guitar Moderne, Blues 411 Internet Radio, Twangville, and Reflections in Blue. Parcek later had an injury to his wrist which curtailed further activity for three years.

Mississippi Suitcase was released on September 4, 2020, via Lightnin' Records. As per his previous album, this collection was recorded in Nashville and Boston, and comprised 11 tracks, with three of Parcek's originals. It was produced by Ducky Carlisle. The musicians included Spooner Oldham and Tom West (keyboards); Luther Dickinson and Ted Drozdowski (guitar); Mickey Raphael (harmonica); Marco Giovino and Tim Carman (drums); Dennis Crouch, Mark Hickox and Dominic Davis (bass guitar). The album's tracks included Parcek inventive interpretations of "Beyond Here Lies Nothin'," "Eleanor Rigby," and "Waiting for the Man." Mary Gunther wrote in Blues Blast magazine, "Boston-based guitar virtuoso Peter Parcek bounces back from a wrist injury that threatened to sideline him permanently with this powerful CD, celebrating the joy of living while baring the full, bluesy depth of the pain and struggle we all endure in these troubled times... A powerful album of blues-rock that was conceived out of his own personal struggles, the three originals and eight covers here span about 80 years of musical history, all of which has undergone thorough reinvention... Like Buddy says, Peter Parcek's a master."

== Awards ==
Parcek was nominated for 'Best New Artist' at the 2011 Blues Music Awards.

Parcek has twice been successful at the New England Music Awards, winning 'Blues Artist of the Year' and 'Blues Audience Guitarist of the Year'.

Premier Guitar choose Mississippi Suitcase as one of the best albums of 2020.

In 2021, Parcek's album, Mississippi Suitcase was nominated for a Blues Music Award in the 'Blues Rock Album' category. Major nominations also came from Blues Blast magazine, and in three categories for Independent Blues Awards - Blues Rock CD, Blues Rock Band and Blues Rock Song.

== Discography ==
=== Albums ===
Year	Title	Record label(s)
2000	Evolution	Lightnin' Records
2010	The Mathematics of Love	VizzTone Records / Red Star Records
2017	Everybody Wants to Go to Heaven	Lightnin' Records
2020	Mississippi Suitcase	Lightnin' Records
