= Short Cut Draw Blood =

Studio album by Jim Capaldi
- Released: December 1975
- Recorded: 1974–1975
- Studio: Muscle Shoals Sound Studio, Sheffield, Alabama; Island Studios, London
- Genre: Rock
- Length: 44:06
- Label: Island
- Producer: Steve Smith, Jim Capaldi, Chris Blackwell

Jim Capaldi chronology
Whale Meat Again (1974)	Short Cut Draw Blood (1975)	The Contender (1978)

Singles from Short Cut Draw Blood
- 1. "It's All Up to You" Released: June 1975; 2. "Love Hurts" Released: December 1975; 3. "Goodbye Love" Released: June 1976 (not released in UK)

Short Cut Draw Blood is the third studio album by the British musician Jim Capaldi, released by Island Records in 1975. It marked a major turning point in Capaldi's career: it was his first album recorded after the breakup of Traffic, and more importantly it was his commercial breakthrough. While Capaldi's first two solo albums had been moderately successful in the United States (in fact, in Short Cut Draw Blood was his least successful album in the United States thus far, with both the album itself at number 193 and the single "Love Hurts" barely scraping into the Billboard charts at number 97), Short Cut Draw Blood entered the charts in several other countries for the first time. This was particularly evident in his native United Kingdom; the single "It's All Up to You" at number 27, released a year before the album, became his first top 40 hit there, only to be overshadowed the following year by his cover of "Love Hurts", which went all the way to number 4.

The title of the album was conceived by co-producer Chris Blackwell.

== Background ==
The song "Boy with a Problem" was written about former Traffic bandmate Chris Wood, whose self-destructive tendencies (particularly his drug addiction) were a cause of increasing concern for Capaldi. The song features Paul Kossoff on guitar.

== Reception ==
Professional ratings
Review scores
Source	Rating
AllMusic	4.5/5 stars
Classic Rock	6/10 stars

Rolling Stone called the album "still uneven" and "unfocused" but a promising step forward from his first solo work. Their review approved of both the session musicians and the arrangements, but criticized Capaldi's lyrics as "simply absurd" or "rather embarrassingly sentimental", being at his best only on the cover of "Love Hurts", where "he brings a sense of pain very different from Roy Orbison's original."

AllMusic's retrospective review was more satisfied with the variety of styles, commenting "dipping into a wide range of musical styles, there is something for everyone on Short Cut Draw Blood", and saying the album is even better than his first. On the contrary, Classic Rock review lamented "too much disjointed dabbling and lack of cohesion" on "several cuts, sounding awkwardly like below-par leftovers from the previous album."

== Track listing ==
All tracks composed by Jim Capaldi, except where indicated.

Side one

1. "Goodbye Love"
  - Jim Capaldi - vocals, drum machine
  - Ray Allen - saxophone
  - Steve Winwood - guitar, organ, piano, bass
  - Remi Kabaka - percussion
  - Rebop Kwaku Baah - percussion
2. "It's All Up to You"
  - Jim Capaldi - drums, vocals, percussion
  - Jess Roden - guitar
  - John "Rabbit" Bundrick - piano, clavinet
  - Phil Chen - bass
  - Harry Robinson - string arrangements
3. "Love Hurts" (Boudleaux Bryant)
  - Jim Capaldi - vocals
  - Chris Spedding - guitar
  - Steve Winwood - piano
  - Jean Roussel - electric piano, minimoog
  - Rosko Gee - bass
  - Gerry Conway - drums
  - Ray Allen - percussion
  - Harry Robinson - string arrangements
4. "Johnny Too Bad" (Trevor "Batman" Wilson, Winston Bailey, Roy Beckford, Derrick Crooks - The Slickers cover)
  - Jim Capaldi - vocals
  - Ray Allen - saxophone
  - Muscle Shoals Horns - horns
  - Pete Carr - lead guitar
  - Jimmy Johnson - rhythm guitar, horn arrangements
  - Peter Yarrow - acoustic guitar
  - Barry Beckett - piano, organ
  - David Hood - bass
  - Roger Hawkins - drums, spoons
  - Rebop Kwaku Baah - percussion
  - Remi Kabaka - percussion
5. "Short Cut Draw Blood"
  - Jim Capaldi - vocals, percussion
  - Pete Carr - lead guitar
  - Chris Spedding - rhythm guitar
  - Jimmy Johnson - electric guitar
  - Barry Beckett - piano
  - David Hood - bass
  - Roger Hawkins - drums
  - Rebop Kwaku Baah - percussion

Side two

1. "Living on a Marble"
  - Jim Capaldi - vocals, percussion
  - Chris Spedding - lead guitar
  - Jimmy Johnson - rhythm guitar
  - Pete Carr - acoustic guitar
  - Barry Beckett - piano
  - Steve Winwood - bass
  - Roger Hawkins - drums
2. "Boy with a Problem"
  - Jim Capaldi - vocals
  - Paul Kossoff - lead guitar
  - Jimmy Johnson - rhythm guitar
  - Pete Carr - acoustic guitar
  - Steve Winwood - synthesizer
  - Barry Beckett - piano
  - David Hood - bass
  - Roger Hawkins - drums
  - Rebop Kwaku Baah - percussion
  - Harry Robinson - string arrangements
3. "Keep On Trying"
  - Jim Capaldi - vocals
  - Ray Allen - saxophone
  - Rico Rodriguez - trombone
  - Phil - guitar
  - Steve Winwood - piano, organ
  - Rosko Gee - bass
  - Remi Kabaka - drums
  - Rebop Kwaku Baah - percussion
4. "Seagull"
  - Jim Capaldi - vocals
  - Steve Winwood - acoustic guitar, Mellotron, harpsichord
  - Chris Wood - flute
  - Remi Kabaka - percussion

One further track from the sessions, "Sugar Honey", was released as a B-side. Aside from Jim Capaldi on vocals, the performing personnel on the track are not known.

== 2012 Reissue ==
In March 2012 Raven an Australian label reissued Short Cut Draw Blood along with The Contender as a 2 for 1 CD release with 8 bonus tracks, all of them previously released recordings: "Tricky Dicky Rides Again", "Sugar Honey", "If You Think You Know How to Love Me", "Good Night & Good Morning", "Talkin' Bout My Baby", "Still Talkin'", "Goodbye My Love", "Baby You're Not My Problem". The second disc included all the tracks from both the UK The Contender and its USA counterpart Daughter of the Night. The reissue was remastered by Warren Barnett and featured a booklet that discussed the making of both albums.
