= Dan Anthony =

American songwriter

Dan Anthony (formerly Dan Jaramillo) is an American recording artist, songwriter and musician. He played with the surf-rock guitarist Dick Dale, and was the founder of the late 1960s California surf band Royale Monarchs. He also played in the house band for Bob Eubanks' Cinnamon Cinder night clubs. Regularly appearing on his Cinnamon Cinder and Hollywood Dance Time television shows. Later under contract at MCA/Universal, Decca Records where Gary Usher produced Dan's new group The Forte' Four. He was an original member of the Marin County based folk-rock group AnExchange in the early 1970s.

== Royale Monarchs ==
- Whole Lot of Shakin Going On (1962, Dell)
- Sombrero Stomp (1962, Dell)
- The Cinnamon Cinder Show/Bob Eubanks (1963–1965, TV)
- My Babe (1964, Dell)
- (Hey) Surfs Up (1964, Dell)
- Great Balls of Fire (1964, Dell)
- Teen Scene (1964, Dell)
- Cinnamon Cinder Show Christmas Special/Bob Eubanks (1965, TV)

Collector-oriented compilation LPs and CDs containing tracks:

- At the Rockhouse, vol 11 (Eagle)
- Red Hot Rock 'N' Roll (Red Hot)
- High School Favorites (Teen)
- I Want Rock (White Label)

== The Forte Four ==
- Can't You See I'm Trying (1966, Decca)
- Don't Let the Sun Shine on Me (1966, Decca)
- I Don't Wanna Say Goodnight (1966, Decca)
- The Climb (1966, Decca)
- Viva Las Vegas, Original Soundtrack/"The Climb" (1964, MGM)
- The Cool Ones, Original Soundtrack (1967, Warner Bros.)

== AnExchange ==
- Evening of AnExchange (1972)

== Songwriter ==
- The Climb / Forte' Four (1966)
- Leave It All Behind You / AnExchange (1972)
- My Father's Hands (2003)
- Watercolor Dreams (2007, CD)
