= Hear and Now (album) =

Studio album by The Butts Band
- Released: 1975
- Recorded: 1974
- Genre: Rock
- Label: Blue Thumb
- Producer: Jerry Fuller

The Butts Band chronology
Butts Band (1974)	Hear and Now (1975)

Professional ratings
Review scores
Source	Rating
Allmusic	3.5/5 stars

Hear and Now is the second and final album by Butts Band, released in 1975. With the exception of founders Robby Krieger and John Densmore, the band consists entirely of different musicians than the band's debut album.

As with the band's self titled debut album, Hear and Now sold poorly and the group disbanded shortly after the album's release.

== 1996 compilation ==
Both albums by the Butts Band were repackaged together and released in 1996 as One Way label's, "The Complete Recordings". Two studio bonus tracks, "That's All Right" and "Lovin' You For All The Right Reasons", were added to the album.

== Track listing ==
1. "Get Up, Stand Up" (Bob Marley, Peter Tosh)
2. "Corner of My Mind" (Robby Krieger)
3. "Caught in the Middle" (Robby Krieger)
4. "Everybody's Fool" (Alex Richman)
5. "Livin' and Dyin'" (Robby Krieger)
6. "Don't Wake Up" (Robby Krieger)
7. "If You Gotta Make a Fool of Somebody" (Rudy Clark)
8. "Feelin' So Bad" (Alex Richman)
9. "White House" (Michael Stull)
10. "Act of Love" (Robby Krieger)

== Personnel ==
- Michael Stull – vocals, guitar, piano
- Robby Krieger – guitar
- Alex Richman – keyboards, vocals (4, 8)
- Karl "Slick" Rucker – bass
- John Densmore – drums
- Mike Berkowitz – drums, percussion

Additional personnel

- Bobbye Hall – congas
