= Ships in the Night (musician) =

American electronic music project

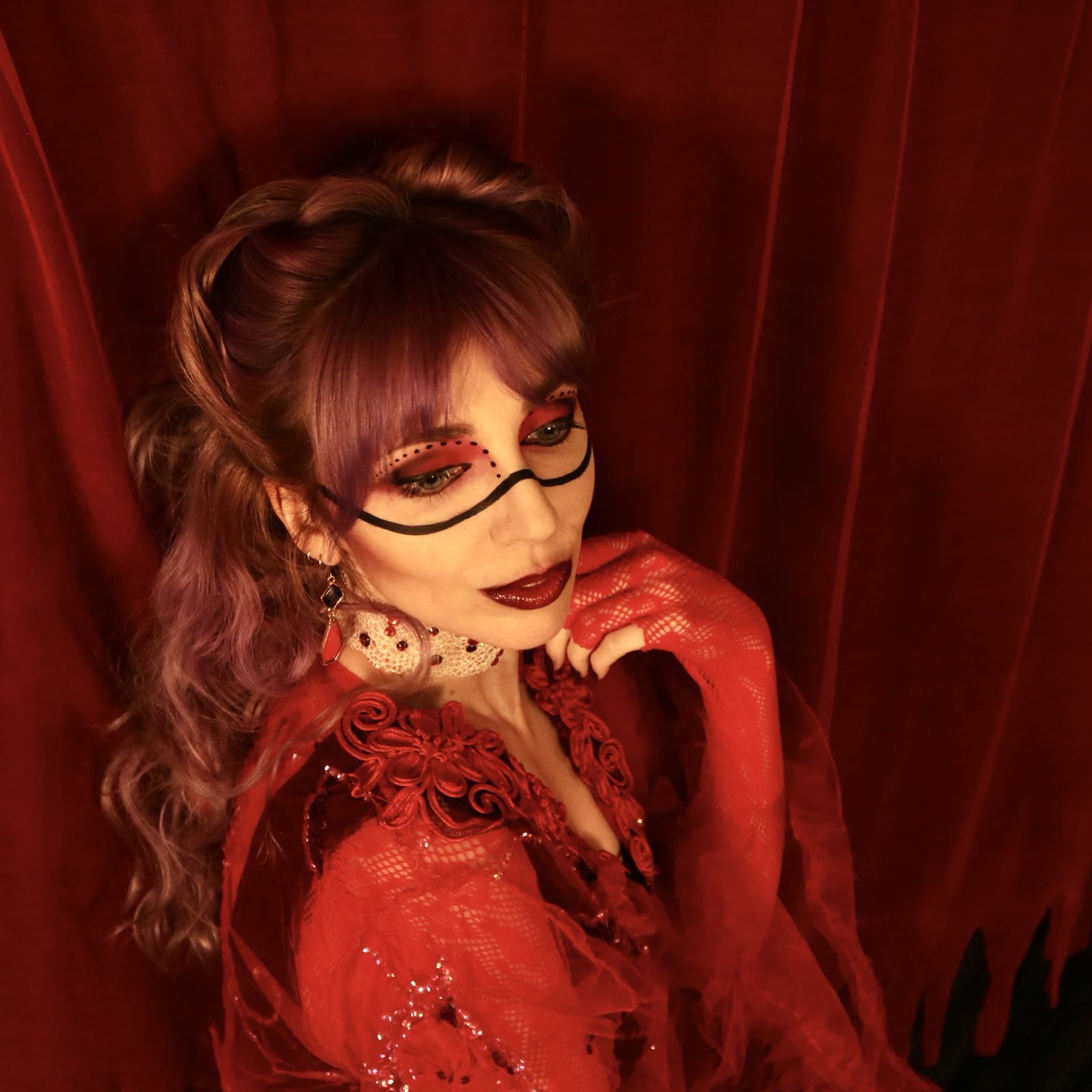
- Ships in the Night in 2025

Background information
- Origin: Charlottesville, Virginia, US
- Genres: electronic; synthwave; darkwave; witch house; goth; dream pop; ambient
- Years active: 2014–present
- Labels: Cleopatra; Metropolis
- Members: Alethea Leventhal

Ships in the Night (stylized as Ships In The Night) is a solo electronic, synthwave music project created by Alethea Leventhal based in Charlottesville, Virginia, and New York City. Her third full-length album, Protection Spells, was released via Metropolis Records on May 2, 2025.

== History ==
Following music projects in high school and college, Leventhal formed Ships in the Night in 2014 and released the first EP, Ships in the Night, in 2015. The first full-length album, Myriologues, was self-released in 2017. The electronic album is stylized as witch house and chillwave, with themes of loss and grief.

In 2018, Leventhal began working on another EP and started recording in early 2020. However, due to the COVID-19 pandemic, release of For a Sick World was delayed until 2021. In the summer of that same year, Leventhal signed with Cleopatra Records to release her second full-length album, Latent Powers. In contrast with Myriologues, this album has more themes of possibility, potential, and the "cathartic strength...found within darkness".

In 2024, Leventhal signed with Metropolis Records to publish her third full-length album, Protection Spells. She released the first single of this album, "Some of Those Dreams", in November 2024 and the second single, "Blood Harmony", in April 2025. Protection Spells was released digitally on May 2, 2025, and on CD May 9, 2025, via Metropolis Records. The album features ten original tracks, including the two previously released singles and a cover of Depeche Mode's "Enjoy the Silence". Protection Spells is stylized as a dark pop, electronic album that expresses an overarching theme of inspiring "strength, focus, and transformation during challenging times". Leventhal celebrated its debut with an album release show and tribute to David Lynch (dubbed "The Black Lodge Ball") on May 3, 2025, in her hometown of Charlottesville and again on May 9, 2025, in nearby Richmond, Virginia. Protection Spells has garnered positive reviews, with one critic describing it as "magical and mythological" and "an enchanting and evocative creative project". Another critic noted its significant shift toward "good electro-pop" compared to previous Ships in the Night albums.

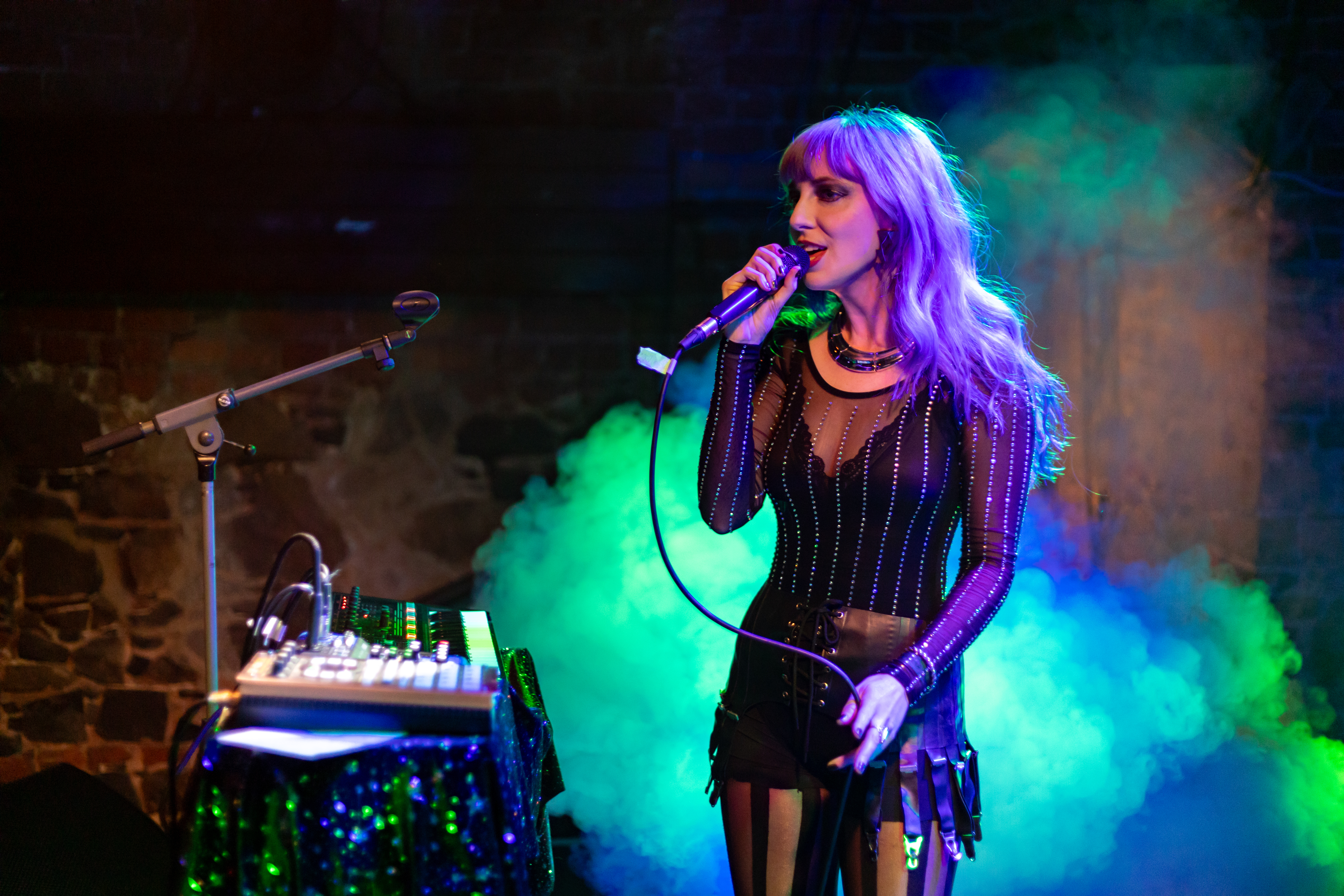
Ships in the Night performing at Wave-Gotik-Treffen in 2025

In June 2025, Ships in the Night performed at the annual Wave-Gotik-Treffen goth festival in Leipzig, Germany.

== Style and influences ==
Ships in the Night's music includes electronic, synthwave, darkwave, vaporwave, witch house, goth, dream pop, ambient, and neo-classical. The music typically features prominent harmonies, synthesizers, and upbeat rhythms coupled with emotional vocals and lyrics.

Leventhal's musical inspirations include sleep struggles (insomnia, nightmares), movies, outside noises (bird songs, church bells, trains), physical movement, and personal experiences. She enjoys or has been influenced by The Cure, Joy Division, Depeche Mode, Kraftwerk, Motown artists, David Bowie, Kate Bush, Elizabeth Fraser, Björk, Missy Elliott, Patti Smith, Siouxsie Sioux, the television series Twin Peaks, David Lynch, E.E. Cummings, Wim Wenders, and Laurie Anderson.

== Members ==
=== Current members ===
- Alethea Leventhal – vocals, keyboards, programming (2014–present)

== Discography ==
=== Full-length albums ===
- Myriologues (2017)
- Latent Powers (2021)
- Protection Spells (2025)

=== Remix albums ===
- The Remixes (2019)

=== EPs ===
- Ships in the Night (2014)
- Wire & Light (2016), split EP
- For a Sick World (2021)
- Asleep in Midwinter (2023)
