= Ralph Covert =

- Born: May 25, 1962 (age 64); Sioux Falls, South Dakota, U.S.
- Origin: Chicago, Illinois, U.S.
- Genres: Rock, alternative rock, indie, children's music, kindie rock
- Occupations: Musician, actor, singer, songwriter
- Instruments: Vocals, guitar, piano, harmonica
- Years active: 1987–present
- Labels: Waterdog, Minty Fresh, Disney Sound
- Website: www.ralphcovert.net

Ralph Covert is an American musician, singer, songwriter, performer, producer, playwright, actor, educator, and record company executive. He is the lead singer of children's music group Ralph's World and lead singer of the Chicago based indie-rock band The Bad Examples. Ralph's World was nominated for Best Musical Album for Children at the 48th Annual Grammy Awards.

Among his many songs, he has a writing credit for the song "Not Dead Yet", featured on the Styx album Edge of the Century, released in 1990.

Along with G. Riley Mills, he wrote Sawdust And Spangles and Streeterville, both earning Joseph Jefferson Awards for Best New Work. The pair also collaborated on The Flower Thieves and A Nutcracker Christmas.

He has also worked as a record producer. His production credits include Framing Caroline by Los Angeles based singer-songwriter Kat Parsons, released in 1999.

== Personal life ==
Ralph has one daughter and a son.

== Discography ==
=== With The Bad Examples ===
- Meat: the Bad Examples (1987)
- Bad Is Beautiful (1991)
- Kisses 50 Cents (1995)
- Cheap Beer Night (1995)
- 5000 Days (2001)
- Good Examples of Bad Examples (2005)
- Smash Records (2011)

=== Solo albums ===
- Eat at Godot's (1993)
- Adam McCarthy (1994)
- Birthday (1997)

=== Children's albums ===
- Ralph's World (2001)
- At the Bottom of the Sea (2002)
- Happy Lemons (2002)
- Peggy's Pie Parlor (2003)
- The Amazing Adventures of Kid Astro (2004)
- Green Gorilla, Monster & Me (2005)
- ‘’A Holly Jolly Ralph’s World’’ (2005, Mini Fresh Records scrapped Christmas album)
- ‘’Welcome to Ralph’s World”’ (2006, Walt Disney Records greatest hits album)
- The Rhyming Circus (2008, Walt Disney Records)
- ‘’All Around Ralph’s World’’ (2010)
- ‘’Ralph’s World Rocks & Reads’’ (2015 compilation album)
- Time Machine Guitar (2017)

== Filmography ==
- Ralph's World: Say Hello (2003) – Ralph
- Welcome to Ralph’s World (2006) - Ralph
- Ralph's World: Time Machine Guitar (2013) – Ralph
