= Butts Band (album) =

Studio album by Butts Band
- Released: January 15, 1974
- Recorded: 1973
- Genre: Rock
- Label: Blue Thumb
- Producer: Bruce Botnick

Butts Band chronology
Butts Band (1974)	Hear and Now (1975)

Butts Band is the first album by Butts Band, released on January 15, 1974. "Pop-a-Top" was released as a single, with "Baja Bus" on the B side. Band founders Robby Krieger and John Densmore would assemble an entirely new group of musicians for the band's second and final album, 1975's Hear and Now.

== Critical reception ==
Professional ratings
Review scores
Source	Rating
Allmusic	3.5/5 stars

In a retrospective review for AllMusic, Joe Viglione gave the album a rating of three and a half out of five stars. He noted that the album is "very musical and great stuff, it just had no image, introduced us to new personalities."

== 1996 compilation ==
Both albums by the Butts Band were repackaged together and released in 1996 as One Way label's, "The Complete Recordings". Two studio bonus tracks, "That's All Right" and "Lovin' You For All The Right Reasons", were added to the album.

== Track listing ==
1. "I Won't Be Alone Anymore" (Robby Krieger)
2. "Baja Bus" (Robby Krieger)
3. "Sweet Danger" (Jess Roden)
4. "Pop-A-Top" (Jess Roden, Phil Chen)
5. "Be with Me" (Robby Krieger)
6. "New Ways" (Jess Roden)
7. "Love Your Brother" (Robby Krieger)
8. "Kansas City" (Jerry Leiber, Mike Stoller)

== Personnel ==
According to the liner notes:

- Jess Roden – vocals, rhythm guitar
- Robby Krieger – lead guitar
- Roy Davies – keyboards, synthesizers
- Phil Chen – bass; rhythm guitar on "Pop-A-Top"
- John Densmore – drums

Additional musicians

- Mick Weaver – Wurlitzer piano on "New Ways" and "Kansas City", organ on "Love Your Brother"
- Larry McDonald – congas on "Baja Bus" and "Pop-A-Top"
- Allan Sharp – congas on "Love Your Brother"
