= Cleopatra Records =

American independent record label

- Founded: January 1992; 34 years ago
- Founder: Brian Perera
- Genre: Gothic rock; deathrock; hard rock; industrial; metal; electronic
- Country of origin: United States
- Location: Los Angeles, California
- Official website: cleorecs.com

Cleopatra Records is an American independent record label that has the sub-labels Hypnotic Records, Goldenlane, Stardust, Purple Pyramid, Deadline and X-Ray Records.

== History ==
Founded in January 1992 by Brian Perera, it specializes in gothic rock, deathrock, hard rock, heavy metal and reissues of out-of-print music. It is known for its compilations, usually collections of cover songs performed by bands signed to the label.

=== Notable artists ===
Current and previous notable artists include: Gary Numan, Kat Parsons, Electric Hellfire Club, Ministry, Christian Death (Featuring Rozz Williams), Switchblade Symphony, Gin Blossoms, Sponge, Leæther Strip, X Marks the Pedwalk, Mephisto Walz, Kill Switch...Klick, Information Society, Heaven 17, Steve Peregrin Took, Genitorturers, Download, The Warlocks, Shadow Project, Missing Persons, Razed in Black, Unwritten Law, Blackburner, Ships In The Night, and Flaw.

== See also ==
- List of record labels
- List of electronic music record labels
