= Bob Segarini =

American-Canadian musician and radio host (1945–2023)

- Born: Robert Joseph Segarini; 28 August 1945; San Francisco, California, U.S.
- Died: 10 July 2023 (aged 77) Toronto, Ontario, Canada
- Genres: Rock
- Occupations: Singer, songwriter, composer, radio host
- Label: Bomb Records

Robert Joseph Segarini (28 August 1945 – 10 July 2023) was an American-Canadian recording artist, singer, songwriter, composer, and radio host. During a professional music career primarily developed between 1968 and the early 1980s, Segarini was particularly popular in Canada. He is also notable as one of the founding members of The Wackers.

== History ==
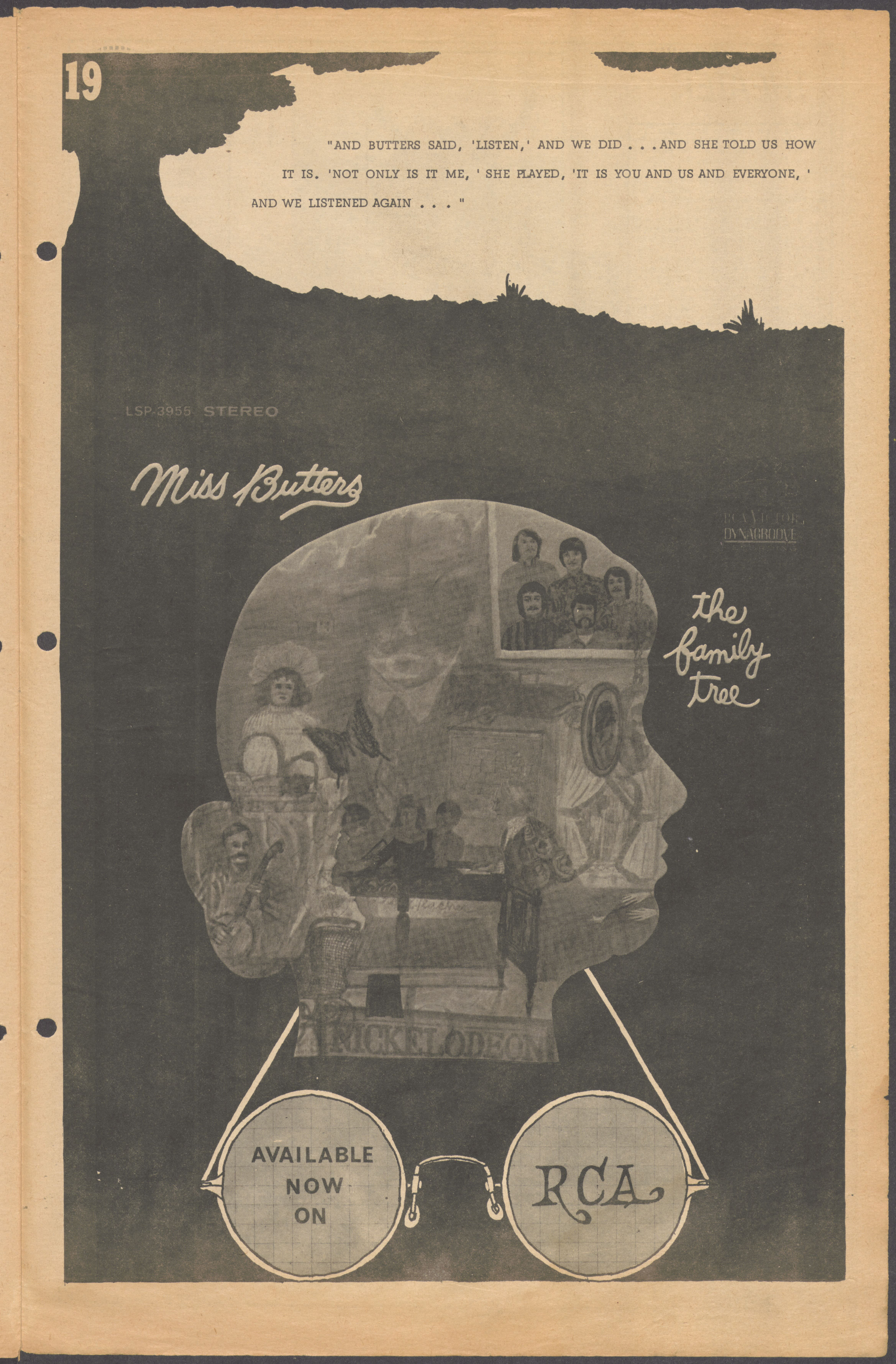
Ad for The Family Tree's album Miss Butters.

Segarini's earliest band, The Ratz, was a local Los Angeles group with Gary Duncan, who later formed Quicksilver Messenger Service. Around 1966, Segarini formed Family Tree with guitarist and keyboardist Jimmy De Cocq, singer Michael Dure, drummer Vann Slatter, and bassist Bill "Kootch" Trochim. The group released a folk rock-style single on the Mira label, before signing with RCA Records; they released a second single on RCA in 1967, followed by their only album, Miss Butters, in 1968. Now considered one of the first concept albums (inspired by Segarini's real-life kindergarten teacher, Miss Grady) it features a suite of songs that depict the life of a spinster school teacher, Miss Butters, who is born into a showbiz family, but experiences a failed relationship that leads her to devote life to children and teaching, before dying old and lonely. Produced by Rick Jarrard, with arrangements by George Tipton, it was recorded during the same period that Jarrard and Tipton were working on the Harry Nilsson LP Aerial Ballet - Nilsson collaborated with Segarini on the track "Butters Lament" and the album features some of the same session players who contributed to Aerial Ballet.

Next Segarini formed Roxy with De Cocq and Randy Bishop playing bass and vocals. The group signed with Elektra Records in 1969, but after one album, producer Gary Usher reorganised the band adding drummer Spencer Earnshaw and former guitarist from Family Tree, Mike Stull, and bassist Bill 'Kootch' Trochim. The new group released three albums as The Wackers, Wackering Heights, Hot Wacks, and Shredder.

Segarini, together with Randy Bishop, co-wrote and recorded two songs for the film Vanishing Point (1971), "Dear Jesus God" and "Over Me". He has also worked with the British songstress Elkie Brooks.

In 1974, Segarini founded The Dudes, with Trochim and Wayne Cullen from the final Wackers aggregate, Ritchie and David Henman - previously with April Wine, and Brian Greenway, future April Wine guitarist. They recorded one album for Columbia Records, We're No Angels, and almost completed a second album before Columbia dropped them from their roster leading to the band break-up. Parts of the second album made their way onto CD along with a collection of unreleased recordings, All The Young Dudes - All The Old Demos on Pacemaker, put together for (and only sold at) their 1997 reunion show.

Segarini went on to a solo career, recording four albums: Gotta Have Pop, On the Radio, Goodbye L.A., and Vox Populi. The first three have been remastered and re-issued with bonus tracks by Bullseye Records.

During the mid-1980s, Segarini began his career in the radio industry, first with CHUM-FM, followed by several stints at Classic Rock radio station CILQ - known to Toronto locals as Q107. It was there that he adopted the moniker "The Iceman". In 2009, after a successful stint on Sirius Satellite Radio's channel 85, Segarini began writing weekly columns for FYI Music - an online magazine devoted to the music industry. His thrice-weekly column was titled "Don't Believe a Word I Say", named after his 1979 single from Gotta Have Pop.

Segarini died in Toronto on 10 July 2023, at the age of 77. He had been fighting diabetes.

== Solo discography ==
=== Albums ===
Year	Album	CAN RPM	Label
1977	EP	—	A&M
1978	Gotta Have Pop	94	Bomb/Epic
1978	On the Radio	—	Bomb/Epic
1979	Goodbye L.A.	89	Bomb/Epic
1981	Vox Populi!	—	Anthem

=== Singles ===
Year	Single	Chart Positions			Album
Year	Single	CAN	CAN AC	CAN Country	Album
1978	"When the Lights Are Out"/"Dressed in the Dark"	—	—	—	Gotta Have Pop
1979	"Gotta Have Pop"/"People Are Strange" (UK)	—	—	—	Gotta Have Pop
1979	"Don't Believe a Word I Say"/"People Are Strange"	97	—	—	Gotta Have Pop
1979	"Livin' in the Movies"/"Dressed in the Dark" (UK)	—	—	—	Gotta Have Pop
1979	"It's Christmas Time"/"It's Christmas Time (Instrumental)"	—	—	—	non album track
1980	"Goodbye L.A."/"Livin' in the Movies"	81	—	—	Goodbye L.A.
1980	"Please Please Please"/"Demographics"	—	—	—	Goodbye L.A.
1981	"City Bred"/"Danger Guy"	—	6	45	Vox Populi!
1981	"Voice of the People"/"Money in the Pocket"	—	—	—	Vox Populi!

== Releases (1965–81) ==
1965 The Us – Single

Just Me/How Can I Tell Her (Autumn Records - unreleased) featured on the album 'Nuggets from the Golden State - Dance With Me: the Autumn Teen Sound' (Big Beat Records CDWIKD 128, 1994)

1968 Family Tree – Miss Butters (RCA LPM-3955 & LSP-3955)

Birthday/Dirgeday, Melancholy Vaudeville Man, Any Other Baby, Sideshow, Mrs. McPheeny, Butters Lament, Simple Life, Slippin' Thru My Fingers, Nine to Three, Lesson Book Life, Nickelodeon Music, Miss Butters, Underture, Keepin' a Secret,* Do You Have the Time?,* She Had To Fly,* He Spins Around*

Family Tree – Singles

Prince of Dreams/Live Your Own Life (Mira 228, 1966) Keepin' a Secret/Do You Have the Time? (RCA 47-9184, 1967) Slippin' Through My Fingers/Miss Butters (RCA 47-9565, 1968) She Had To Fly/He Spins Around (RCA 47-9671, 1968)

1969 Roxy (Elektra EKS 74063)

Love, Love, Love, Sing a Song, New York City, Somebody Told You, Love for a Long Time, Windy Day, You Got a Lot of Style, I Got My Friends, Yesterday's Song, Rock & Roll Circus

Roxy – Singles

Love Love Love/New York City (Elektra EK45682, 1969) Rock and Roll Circus/Somebody Told You (Elektra EK45683, 1969) Listen To The Music/Tickets (Elektra EK45717, 1970) (We Gotta) Stop The War (Promo) (Elektra PEACE-1, 1970)

1971 Segarini and Bishop – Vanishing Point Soundtrack (Amos AAS 8002 - USA Soundtrack STCS1410 - UK)

Dear Jesus God, Over Me

1971 The Wackers – Wackering Heights (Elektra EKS 74089)

Travelin' Time, Body Go Round, Don't Be Cruel, Country Queen, Strangers, Don't Put Down the Singer, I Don't Want My Love Refused, White House, I Like, On the Way Up, Such a Good Thing, No Place for the Children

1972 The Wackers – Hot Wacks (Elektra EKS 75025)

I Hardly Know Her Name, We Can Be, Oh My Love, Wait And See, Do You Know The Reason, Breathe Easy, Time Will Carry On, Maybe Tomorrow, Hot Wacks, Anytime / Anyday, Find Your Own Way, Time Will Carry On (Won't It? )

1972 The Wackers – Shredder (Elektra EKS 75046)

Day And Night, Hey Lawdy Lawdy, I'll Believe In You, Puttin Myself To Sleep, Eventually - Even You, Even Me, Coming Apart, It's My Life, Beach Song, Buck Duckdog Memorial Jam, Last Dance

1973/2011 The Wackers – Wack 'n' Roll (Bullseye Records WACK-001)

I Started To Rock, Rock And Roll Circus, Little Queenie, In The Aisles, Juvenile Delinquent, Teenage Love, Don't Fly Off the Handle, Captain Nemo, Tonight/Demons, She Loves You (Live),* Roll Over Beethoven (Live)*

The Wackers – Singles I Don't Want My Love Refused/I Like (Elektra EK45743, 1971) Body Go Round/White House (Elektra EK45758, 1971) Oh My Love (Promo)/Same (Elektra EK45772, 1972) I Hardly Know Her Name/Do You Know the Reason (Elektra EK45783, 1972) Day and Night/Last Dance (Elektra EK45816, 1972)(No. 50 CAN) Hey Lawdy Lawdy/I'm In Love (Elektra EK45841, 1973) All I Wanna Do Is Love You/I Got A Feelin' (Polydor2065226, 1974) Captain Nemo/Tonite (Bomp102, 1975)

1975 The Dudes – We're No Angels (Columbia PC33577)

Saturday Night, Fuel Injection, I Just Wanna Dance, Lylee Lady, Deeper and Deeper, Dancin' Shoes, Got Me Where You Want Me, My Mind's on You, Rock & Roll Debutante, We're No Angels

(1996 CD Release/2009 Mp3 Download) The Dudes – All The Young Dudes - All The Old Demos (Pacemaker Records/Bullseyesongs Mp3 Download)

Please Mr Postman, Rock and Roll Debutante, Little Queenie, Time On My Hands, Fuel Injection, Right Down To It, City Bred, Too Young, Wimmin R Strange, Marlene, Sugar, Meet You After School, Linda, Gotta Have Pop, Dancin' Shoes, Sweet Love, Laurel Ann, Silk N Lace

The Dudes - Singles

Dancin' Shoes (Promo)/Same (Columbia10259, 1975) Saturday Night/Rock & Roll Debutante (Columbia10212, 1976)

1977 Segarini – EP (A&M AM452)

Wanna Get To Know You Better, Starlight, I Want You To Stay, I'm Not Your Fool

1978 Segarini – Gotta Have Pop (Bomb/Epic BOMB7027 - CAN, EPC 83806 - UK)

Gotta Have Pop, Hide Away, Afraid Of The Ocean, I Don't Want To Lose You, Don't Believe A Word I Say, Livin' In The Movies Steady Eddie, Dressed In The Dark, When The Lights Are Out, Love Story, Starlight,* Body Go Round,* Laurel Ann,* C'est Tout,* Livin' In The Movies (Remix),* Groucho Marx,* Goodbye*

1978 Segarini – On The Radio (Bomb/Epic BOMB7030 - CAN)

Gotta Have Pop,* Teenage Love, I Don't Want To Lose You, People Are Strange, Afraid Of The Ocean, Hideaway, All I Want To Do Is Love You, Steady Eddie, Dressed In The Dark, When The Lights Are Out, Love Story, Don't Believe A Word I Say, Zoom,* Juvenile Delinquent

1979 Segarini – Goodbye LA (Bomb/Epic BOMB/EPIC90576 - USA, BOMB7032 - CAN, EPC 84086 - UK)

I Like the Beatles, I Hardly Know Her Name, Odd Couples, Day and Night, Nervous Breakdown, Teenage Love, Please, Please, Please, Rock & Roll Moment, Who's Lovin' You, Demographics, Goodbye L.A., My Baby Is an Airhead, It's Christmas,* It's Christmas (Jingleoke),* In My Life (Live)*

1981 Segarini – Vox Populi! (Anthem ANR11028 - CAN)

Voice of the People, Waitin' In Line, City Bred, Have Love Will Travel, Money In The Pocket, Danger Guy, Get It Back, City Night, Too Late, My Baby Is An Airhead (Part 2)

Segarini - Singles

When The Lights Are Out/Dressed In The Dark (BOMB5015 - CAN, 1978) Gotta Have Pop/People Are Strange (EPIC SEPC7474 - UK, 1979) Don't Believe A Word I Say/People Are Strange (BOMB5018 - CAN, 1979) Livin' In The Movies/Dressed In The Dark (EPIC SEPC78029 - UK, 1979) Goodbye L.A/Livin' In The Movies (EPIC E48369 - CAN, 1979) It's Christmas Time/Instrumental (EPIC E48381 - CAN, 1979) Please, Please, Please/Demographics (BOMB5033 - US, EPIC E48384 - CAN, SEPC8223 - UK, 1979) City Bred/Danger Guy (Anthem ANS029 - CAN, 1981) Voice Of The People/Money In The Pocket (Anthem ANS033 - CAN, 1981)

- Bonus tracks from the CD releases of the albums.
