= Marco Giovino =

American drummer

- Born: Boston, Massachusetts, United States
- Genres: Rock, hard rock, blues rock, folk rock, country rock
- Occupation: Musician,
- Instrument(s): Drums, percussion
- Website: Official website

Marco Giovino is an American drummer. He was born in Boston, Massachusetts, and grew up in nearby Burlington.

In 2003, Giovino accompanied in concerts the Welsh musician John Cale, and played on his album, HoboSapiens in the same year.

From 2010 to 2011 he was a member of the Band of Joy, led by Robert Plant, former member of Led Zeppelin. With the group in 2010 they recorded the album Band of Joy. This album was number 8 on Rolling Stone's list of the 30 Best Albums of 2010.

During his career he has collaborated with many other musicians, including Peter Parcek, G. E. Smith, Norah Jones, Kylie Rae Harris, Malcolm Holcombe, and Patty Griffin. He also performed on the Deborah Bonham albums, Spirit (2013) and Bonham-Bullick (2022).
