= Patty Parsons =

Patty Parsons (born in West Virginia) is the former soulful lead singer of AnExchange, a Marin County, California–based folk rock group of the early 1970s.

Patty is the aunt of Kat Parsons, a Los Angeles–based singer-songwriter.
