= Michael J. Stull =

American singer-songwriter

Michael J. Stull (April 17, 1949 - October 30, 2002) was a songwriter, vocalist, guitarist, and voice-over artist from Eureka, California.

He was the first son of Jacquelyn and Joseph Stull. Mike had three brothers, William and Timothy Stull and Jon Majors, and one sister, Patricia Stull. Mike Stull died on October 30, 2002.

== Musical career ==
In the late 1960s, Mike performed in coffee houses and local concerts, and led God's Country, a rock and roll band in Eureka. In his solo performances, Mike's song list showed off the clarity and purity of his voice with songs as diverse as Leonard Cohen's "Suzanne" and the haunting Scottish ballad, "Wild Mountain Thyme".

In 1970, producer David Anderle introduced Stull to Bob Segarini and Randy Bishop. Along with Ernie Earnshaw and William "Kootch" Trochim, they formed The Wackers. The Wackers debut LP Wackering Heights featured Stull's composition White House and was produced by legendary songwriter-producer Gary Usher at Wally Heider Studio San Francisco. The Wackers recorded their second album, Hot Wacks in Montreal, Quebec, which was included in Billboard's "Special Merit Picks":

Their music is penetratingly electrifying, their songs possessing an unusual built-in compulsion. This album contains some lingeringly lovely efforts, ("Oh My Love" and "Do You Know the Reason") as well as ripplingly up-tempo numbers ("I Hardly Know Her Name" and "Breathe Easy.")

Soon after "Hot Wacks," Stull left the group, returning to California to pursue other opportunities; according to Segarini's later recollection, Stull left "to be a technician and get into Da Blues".

Stull was considered as a replacement for Jim Morrison of The Doors, when Morrison moved to Paris in 1971. According to reports, Bill Siddons, who managed both The Wackers and The Doors, claimed Stull had been selected as Morrison's replacement. Fact or rumor, Stull did join up with former Doors John Densmore and Robby Krieger to record the 1975 Butts Band album, "Hear and Now".

== Voice over artist ==
Although he was actively pursuing his musical career, Stull began voice over work with Scooby-Doo, Where Are You!, voicing the Wax Phantom, among others.

Stull later became a renowned voice over artist, and is still cited by voice over agencies as a standout talent. Portfolio Cover for Michael Stull

Voice-over producer Michael Sheehy claims Stull among the "pretty fierce talent" he has directed. According to Joe Cipriano, Stull was "a fantastic musician, singer, voice over artist," who sang and voiced the "today ... is the day" jingle for Yamaha motorcycles. Stull was the voice of the popular alcoholic beverage, California Cooler. Some of these ads remain available on YouTube. Stull voiced the introduction to Judge Judy's season 1 episodes, and was succeeded by Jerry Bishop, who announced until his own death in April 2020.

== Songwriter ==
Stull wrote and collaborated on a number of songs. Segarini recalls that he and Stull wrote "I Don't Want My Love Refused" on YouTube one evening in a neighbour's house.

The romantic "White House" ("Do you think that you could be happy/ livin' by the sea/ In a white house with bay windows/ and a lawn that's gone to seed") was recorded on both The Wackers, "Wackering Heights" and The Butts Band, "Hear and Now" albums. Stull's storytelling song style is clear on the demo he cut with Tommy Bolin in 1971.

Stull's lyrical songwriting, grounded in the everyday experience of a career musician, demonstrates a deep psycho-social awareness. In "1000 Girls You'll Never Know," Stull mined the well-trod vein of touring musicians and made it his own. Like Jackson Browne's "Load-Out" and Jesse Winchester's "A Show Man's Life," Stull's road song "1000 Girls You'll Never Know" poignantly speaks to loneliness and busy-ness of the road, and the relationships between musicians and their "stage door ladies":

With the strength that you'll be needing/To carry on alone/She'll come smiling to the darkness of your room)...

She hates the life she lives so much/She'll trade it all to watch you live your own/Standing on the sidelines alone.

She leaves your mind completely/ as the next town comes to view/'Cause there's taxicabs and hotel things to do/Your time's took up with lights and makeup/Guitar strings and talk...

Stull's "Drunken Sailor" captures the spirit of homelessness that is as relevant today as when he wrote it.

Everybody's seen him/sleepin' in the streets/A shiverin' in some doorway down in Old Town

And it's a hard thing/just to walk by/ nobody wants to see an old man cry

But he'll do it/ if he thinks you're an easy touch/ And anyways, he don't ask much...
