= Band of Joy =

English rock band (1966–2011)

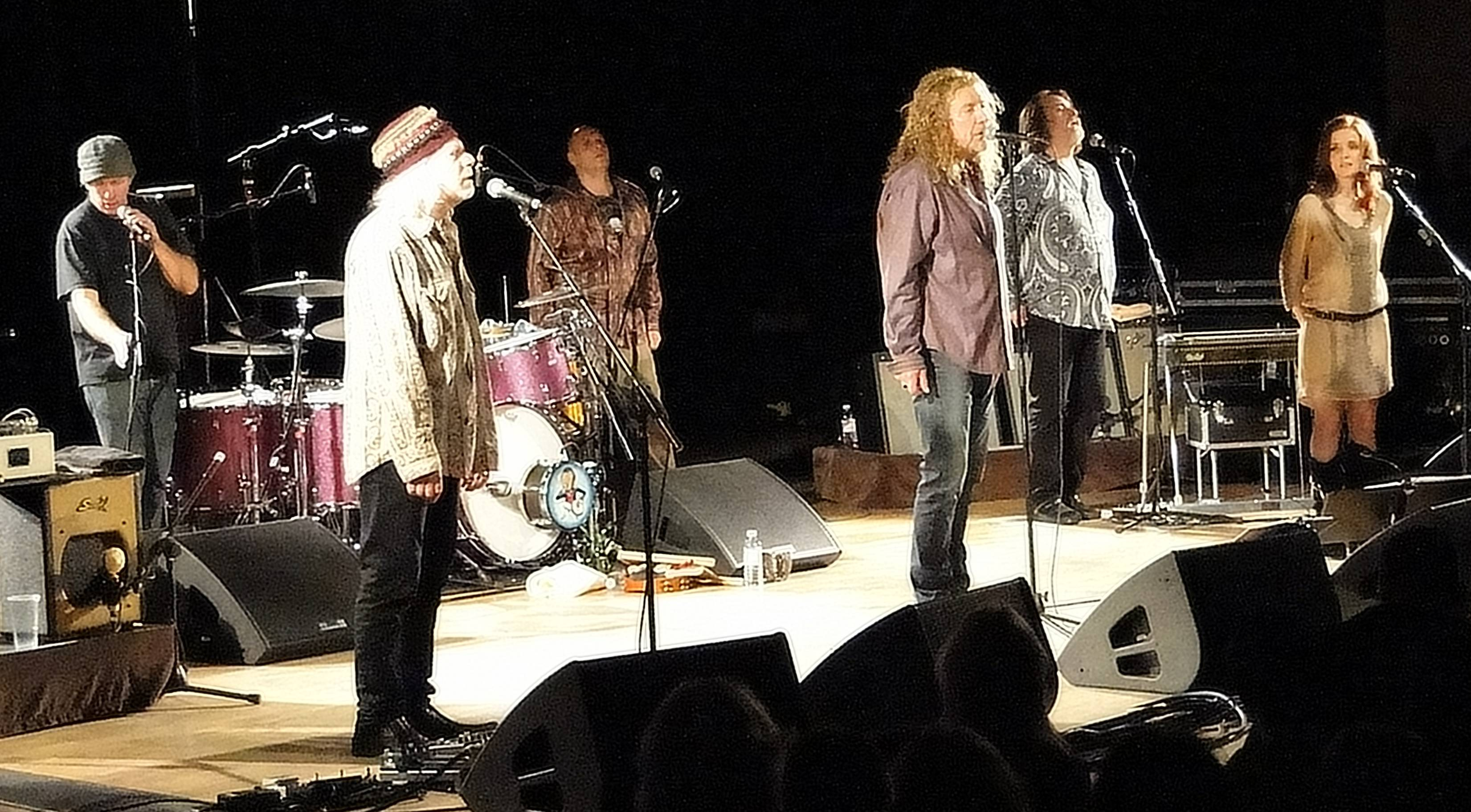
- Band of Joy fronted by Robert Plant, October 2010

Background information
- Origin: West Bromwich, England
- Genres: Folk rock; blues rock; progressive rock
- Years active: 1966–1968; 1977–1983; 2010–2011
- Spinoffs: Led Zeppelin
- Past members: Robert Plant; Chris Brown; Lyndon Laney; Vernon Pereira; John Bonham; Paul Lockey; Kevyn Gammond; Dave Pegg; John Hill; John Kelsey; Mick Strode; Michael Chetwood; John Pasternak; Peter Robinson; Marco Giovino; Patty Griffin; Byron House; Buddy Miller; Darrell Scott

Band of Joy (sometimes known as Robert Plant and the Band of Joy) were an English rock band formed in 1966. Various line-ups of the group performed from 1966 to 1968 and from 1977 to 1983. Frontman Robert Plant revived the band's name in 2010 for a concert tour of North America and Europe.

The band is notable for including two musicians, Robert Plant and John Bonham, who went on to join Led Zeppelin, as well as Dave Pegg, who would become a member of both Fairport Convention and Jethro Tull; and, to a lesser degree, because the band's one-time roadie was Noddy Holder, who later went on to front the band Slade.

== History ==
=== 1966–1968 ===
Band of Joy was originally formed in 1966 in West Bromwich, a town near Birmingham, England, by Chris Brown (keyboards), Vernon Pereira (guitar), and singer Robert Plant. A third incarnation of the band, including Plant's friend John Bonham lasted from 1967 to mid-1968. This line-up included Kevyn Gammond's guitar and Paul Lockey on bass. Their brand of soul and blues was popular with Birmingham mods. This line-up recorded a number of demo recordings in early 1968, but broke up in May 1968 when a recording contract failed to materialise.

Lead guitar duties were briefly served by Dave Pegg, who later played the bass guitar with Fairport Convention and Jethro Tull. Pegg rehearsed with Band of Joy but did not tour with them.

For a 1968 tour of Scotland, Plant and Bonham used bassist John Hill (ex–Uncle Joseph) and guitarist Mick Strode to fill in a temporary line-up.

=== 1977–1983 ===
In 1977 Gammond and Paul Lockey revived Band of Joy, rounding out the line-up with John Pasternak, Peter Robinson, and keyboardist Michael Chetwood. Gammond, Lockey, Pasternak and Robinson had previously played in Bronco. The two albums recorded under this line-up went on to define the trademark sound of the band, with progressive melodies, blues hooks and experimentation with new sounds blending the sounds of the punk movement with classic genres of rock, blues and progressive influences. The group released a second album in 1983 before breaking up.

Gammond later worked with Plant in his group Priory of Brion.

=== 2010–2011 ===
In 2010 it was announced that Plant would form a new band, record an album and tour as Robert Plant & the Band of Joy. The album Band of Joy was number 8 on Rolling Stone's list of the 30 Best Albums of 2010.

In October 2010 the band appeared, alongside the London Oriana Choir at the Roundhouse, London for a special performance at the BBC Radio 2 Electric Proms.

== Personnel ==
=== Members ===
- Robert Plant – vocals (1966, 1967–1968, 2010–2011)
- Chris Brown – keyboards (1966, 1967–1968)
- Vernon Pereira – guitar (1966)
- John Bonham – drums (1967–1968; died 1980)
- Paul Lockey – bass, guitar, vocals (1967–1968, 1977–1983)
- Kevyn Gammond – guitar, vocals (1967–1968, 1977–1983)
- Dave Pegg – guitar (1968)
- John Hill – bass (1968)
- John Kelsey – keyboards (1968)
- Mick Strode – guitar (1968)
- Michael Chetwood – keyboards, vocals (1977–1983)
- John Pasternak – bass, vocals (1977–1983; died 1986)
- Peter Robinson – drums (1977–1983)
- Marco Giovino – drums, percussion, vocals (2010–2011)
- Patty Griffin – vocals, guitar (2010–2011)
- Byron House – bass (2010–2011)
- Buddy Miller – guitar, vocals (2010–2011)
- Darrell Scott – vocals, mandolin, guitar, accordion, pedals, lap steel guitar, banjo (2010–2011)

=== Lineups ===
1966	1966–1967	1967–1968	1968
Robert Plant – vocals; Chris Brown – keyboards; Vernon Pereira – guitar	Disbanded	Robert Plant – vocals; Chris Brown – keyboards; John Bonham – drums; Kevyn Gammond – guitar, vocals; Paul Lockey – bass, guitar, vocals	Robert Plant – vocals; Chris Brown – keyboards; John Bonham – drums; Paul Lockey – bass, guitar, vocals; Dave Pegg – guitar
1968	1968–1977	1977–1983	1983–2010
Robert Plant – vocals; John Bonham – drums; John Hill – bass; John Kelsey – keyboards; Mick Strode – guitar	Disbanded	Kevyn Gammond – lead guitar, backing and lead vocals; Paul Lockey – lead vocals, rhythm guitar; Michael Chetwood – keyboards, backing vocals; John Pasternak – bass, backing vocals; Francesco Nizza – drums	Disbanded
2010–2011
Robert Plant – vocals; Marco Giovino – drums, percussion, vocals; Patty Griffin – vocals, guitar; Byron House – bass; Buddy Miller – guitar, vocals; Darrell Scott – vocals, mandolin, guitar, accordion, pedals, lap steel guitar, banjo

== Discography ==
- Band of Joy (1978)
- 24k (1983)
- Sixty Six to Timbuktu (2003) – Robert Plant retrospective album; includes some Band of Joy recordings, more specifically the covers "Hey Joe" by The Jimi Hendrix Experience and "For What It's Worth" by Buffalo Springfield.
- Band of Joy (2010)

== See also ==
- British rock
- Music of the United Kingdom
