= Bronco (English band) =

English band (1969–1973)

- Genres: Rock; country
- Years active: 1969–1973
- Labels: Island; Polydor
- Past members: Kevyn Gammond; John Pasternak; Pete Robinson; Robbie Blunt; Jess Roden; Dan Fone; Paul Lockey

Bronco were an English five piece rock and country band, who were signed to Island and Polydor Records between 1969 and 1973. They released three albums during their existence, Country Home (1970), Ace of Sunlight (1971) and Smoking Mixture (1973).

== History ==
Bronco were formed in August 1969 by Jess Roden following his split from The Alan Bown Set. They were signed to Island Records by Guy Stevens and, after initially recording tracks at Olympic Studios with him, recorded their first album, Country Home, at Island's own Basing Street Studios during 1970, with the final mix being overseen by Paul Samwell-Smith. One of the album's tracks, "Love" was included on Bumpers, an Island sampler album. The group similarly recorded their second album Ace of Sunlight at Basing Street (1971) which was produced by the band and Richard Digby Smith. Singer-songwriter Clifford T. Ward guested on their debut album Country Home. Trevor Lucas sang back-up vocals on Ace of Sunlight, and both Ian Hunter and Mick Ralphs from Mott The Hoople also guested on that album. In January 1971, Bronco appeared on BBC Two's Disco 2.

Following a serious motorway accident between Cheltenham and Bristol (in which the group's crew – Dick Hayes and Alan Stone – and drummer Pete Robinson and bassist John Pasternak were badly injured) and a later, ill-fated West Coast of America tour, Roden left the band after a final British tour with label-mates Mott The Hoople and John Martyn in the early 1972, to start a solo career. Guitarist Robbie Blunt soon followed and the remaining members drafted in Paul Lockey on vocals (who Kevyn Gammond knew from Band of Joy) and Dan Fone on guitar. This incarnation of Bronco signed to Polydor and released one album, Smoking Mixture.

Bronco's bass player John Pasternak died of a heart attack in September 1986. Led Zeppelin's Robert Plant fronted a tribute event for Pasternak in December of that year, that featured Plant and The Big Town Playboys, and concluded with an ensemble band featuring Plant, Jimmy Page on guitar and Jason Bonham on drums.

Two Bronco tracks are featured on Island records compilation albums: "Love" appeared on Bumpers released in 1970 and "Sudden Street" was on El Pea (1971). "Time Slips Away" was included on the Island Records compilation Meet on the Ledge, released as part of Island's 50th anniversary in 2009.

== Members ==
- Kevyn Gammond – guitars, backing vocals (1969–1973)
- John Pasternak – bass, backing vocals (1969–1973; died 1986)
- Pete Robinson – drums, backing vocals, harmonica (1969–1973)
- Robbie Blunt – guitars, backing vocals (1969–1972)
- Jess Roden – lead vocals, acoustic guitar (1969–1972)
- Dan Fone – guitar, keyboards, backing vocals (1972–1973)
- Paul Lockey – lead vocals, guitar (1972–1973)

== Discography ==
=== Country Home (1970) ===
Label: Island ILPS 9124

1. "Civil Of You Stranger" – (Robbie Blunt) – 3:54
2. "Love" – (Jess Roden) – 4:31
3. "Misfit On Your Stair" – (Clifford T. Ward, Kevyn Gammond) – 3:12
4. "Bumpers West" – (Suzy Worth) – 5:51
5. "Home" – (Jess Roden) – 4:08
6. "Well Anyhow" – (Jess Roden, Kevyn Gammond, Robbie Blunt, John Pasternak, Pete Robinson) – 7:02
7. "Time (So Long Between)" – (Jess Roden, Robbie Blunt) – 5:13

Personnel

- Jess Roden – lead vocals, acoustic guitar, percussion
- Kevyn Gammond – electric and acoustic guitar, backing vocals
- Robbie Blunt – electric and acoustic guitar, backing vocals
- John Pasternak – bass, backing vocals
- Pete Robinson – drums, backing vocals, harmonica
- Jeff Bannister – piano (3, 5)
- Clifford T. Ward – backing vocals (3)

=== Ace of Sunlight (1971) ===
Label: Island ILPS 9161

1. "Amber Moon" – (Jess Roden, Suzy Worth) – 4:02
  - Jess Roden – lead vocals, acoustic guitar
  - Kevyn Gammond – electric guitar
  - Robbie Blunt – electric guitar
  - John Pasternak – bass
  - Pete Robinson – drums
  - Ian Hunter – piano
  - Mick Ralphs – organ
2. "Time Slips Away" – (Robbie Blunt) – 6:05
  - Jess Roden – vocals (parts 1 and 2)
  - Robbie Blunt – electric and acoustic guitars, vocals (part 1)
  - Kevyn Gammond- electric guitar
  - John Pasternak – bass
  - Pete Robinson – drums
  - Paul Bennett – vocals
  - Trevor Lucas – vocals
3. "Some Uncertainty" – (Clifford T. Ward, Kevyn Gammond) – 3:39
  - Jess Roden – lead vocals, harmonica
  - Kevyn Gammond – rhythm acoustic guitar
  - Robbie Blunt – lead acoustic guitar
  - John Pasternak – bass
  - Pete Robinson – drums
  - Paul Davenport – piano
4. "Woman" – (Clifford T. Ward, Kevyn Gammond) – 4:18
  - Jess Roden – lead vocals
  - Kevyn Gammond – electric guitar
  - Robbie Blunt – electric guitar
  - John Pasternak – bass
  - Pete Robinson – drums
5. "New Day Avenue" – (Jess Roden, Suzy Worth) – 6:39
  - Jess Roden – lead vocals, acoustic guitar, percussion
  - Kevyn Gammond – electric guitar
  - Robbie Blunt – electric guitar (outro solo)
  - John Pasternak – bass
  - Pete Robinson – drums, congas
6. "Discernible" – (Kevyn Gammond, Suzy Worth) – 3:47
  - Jess Roden – lead vocals
  - Kevyn Gammond – electric and acoustic guitars
  - Robbie Blunt – electric and acoustic guitars
  - John Pasternak – bass
  - Pete Robinson – drums
  - Terry Allen – organ
7. "Sudden Street" – (Jess Roden) – 6:23
  - Jess Roden – lead vocals, acoustic guitar
  - Kevyn Gammond – lead electric guitar
  - Robbie Blunt – rhythm electric guitar
  - John Pasternak – bass
  - Pete Robinson – drums
  - Paul Bennett – backing vocals
8. "Joys & Fears" – (Jess Roden, Suzy Worth) – 3:39
  - Jess Roden – special guitars, lead vocals, piano

=== Smoking Mixture (1973) ===
Label: Polydor 2383 215

1. "Steal That Gold"
2. "Tennessee Saturday Night"
3. "Tell Me Why"
4. "Attraction"
5. "Southbound State Express"
6. "Turkey In The Straw"
7. "Zonker"
8. "Blueberry Pie"
9. "Strange Awakening"

=== Hidden Masters : The Jess Roden Anthology ===
Label: HiddenMasters HM 3001 (2013) – contained a number of previously unreleased tracks by Bronco (including)

- "Lazy Now" – a different mix to the original 7" single mix released in 1970
- "All The Love I Sing (Love)" – a different mix of the song that was included on Country Home
- "New Day Avenue" – a different mix to the song that was included on Ace of Sunlight
- "Bumpers West" – a different mix of the song that was included on Country Home
- "Sudden Street" – a different mix of the song that was included on Ace of Sunlight
- "Joys And Fears" – a different mix of the song that was included on Ace of Sunlight
