= Fay Ray (band) =

Welsh new wave band

- Origin: Bangor, Wales
- Genre: New wave
- Years active: 1979–1982
- Labels: Surrey Sound; WEA; Elektra
- Past members: Sheila Macartney; John Lovering; Jeff Taylor; Tony Travis; Owen Hughes
- Website: fayray.co.uk

Fay Ray were a Welsh new wave band who were active from 1979 to 1982. The band formed in Bangor in north-west Wales in 1979 and despite rumours to the contrary were not named after the dog of photographer William Wegman.

The band was signed by producer Nigel Gray to his Surrey Sounds label, and they released a single, "Family Affairs", in 1980.

The single "Family Affairs" was one of three records of the week selected by Lynden Barber in his "Essential Buys" column in Melody Maker; the other two being "Reward" by the Teardrop Explodes and "I'm in Love with a German Film Star" by the Passions. However, as a small independent label, Surrey Sound did not have the distribution network in place to capitalise on this success; it was not in the shops to buy. It did, however help spark the interest of Fred Hyam of Elektra Records. Following a chance meeting with the band's prospective manager at the annual MIDEM record business festival in 1981, Fay Ray were then signed to WEA. The band recorded their debut album Contact You with Gray and it was released in 1982, preceded by the single "(Waiting for the) Heatwave". Two music videos were made for songs from the album, "Heatwave" and "Modern Lovers".

The band also recorded two live performances of "Heatwave" and "Contact You" in summer 1982 at the BBC Television Centre as part of a show made about music in Bangor, Gwynedd by the BBC Community Programmes Unit and The Gwynedd Union of Musicians.

Despite some commercial success in the US and in Europe, including an appearance on episode 71 of Germany's Musikladen (the German equivalent of the UK's Top of the Pops) on 20 May 1982, sales of Contact You in the UK were poor. Reports that a second album had already been recorded but was not released when the label dropped the band are incorrect. The band had recorded four demo tracks in the hope of WEA renewing the contract for a second year, but WEA declined. Disillusioned with the music business, the band split up shortly afterwards.

However, following a long hiatus, they were to reform for occasional reunion gigs around the Bangor area.

In 2018, due to increased attention to their music via the Internet, the band self-reissued a remastered Contact You on CD, with five bonus tracks [the above-mentioned demos plus the original 7" single mix of "Family Affairs" and new sleeve notes.

This was launched with a reunion gig at Bethesda's Neuadd Ogwen on November 7th 2018.

Although the CD has long since sold out, the tracks from it still exist in the digital domain, published by CD Baby https://www.youtube.com/watch?v=pnHvUvC9j8g

On 23 March 2022, band members announced that guitarist John Lovering died on 21 March 2022, following a long illness.

== Band members ==
- Sheila Macartney – lead vocals, guitar, organ, tambourine
- John Lovering – guitar
- Jeff Taylor – saxophone, accordion, flute, backing vocals
- Tony Travis – bass, backing vocals
- Owen Hughes – drums
