= The Bad Examples =

- Origin: Chicago, Illinois
- Genres: Rock, alternative rock, indie
- Years active: 1987–present
- Label: Waterdog Music
- Members: Ralph Covert; Tom O'Brien; Pickles Piekarski; 1952-2013; Steve Gerlach; Larry Beers

The Bad Examples is an indie alternative pop-rock group formed by songwriter, acoustic guitarist, and vocalist Ralph Covert in 1987 in Chicago, Illinois. The band has had significant changes in the line-up over the years but the core of the group (Covert, electric guitarist Tom O'Brien, bassist Tom "Pickles" Piekarski) have worked consistently together since 1990 with electric guitarist Steve Gerlach (ex-Phantom Helmsmen) joining in 1994 and still performing live and occasionally serving as co-producer. Founding drummer Terry Wathen was still making live appearances as late as 2008 but is now officially drummer emeritus with Larry Beers (ex-Way Moves, Charming Beggars) now an official member. Interim drummers included John Richardson, Ron Barnes, David Thornton and currently Bean Weng.

The Bad Examples are limited in performing and putting out new albums largely due to Ralph Covert's success as creator of the family music rock band, Ralph's World. Musically it is similar to The Bad Examples but the lyrics and themes are oriented towards young children, approximately ages 2 to 7. The sixth Ralph's World album, "Green Gorilla, Monster & Me" was nominated for a Grammy award as "Best Musical Album For Children." Ralph's World was originally signed to Mini Fresh, a division of the Minty Fresh label, and subsequently signed to Disney Sound for a hits compilation, several videos, and one all-new project along with the re-release of the previous six albums. The most recent Ralph's World album is on BarNone Records.

Lead guitarist of the Bad Examples, John Duich, who was on their most successful album, Bad Is Beautiful, and the band's most extensive US tours but left in 1994 to return to Chicago's blues scene, died of heart failure in 1998.

Aside from one 12" single and some isolated benefit tracks, The Bad Examples have released all their music on Waterdog Records, a label now exclusively owned by Ralph Covert. While the original releases are credited solely to The Bad Examples, beginning with the Two-Meter Sessions billing is to Ralph Covert & The Bad Examples both to help include his solo work (which also features players from the band) and to differentiate them internationally from a German band with the same name.

While "MEAT:" was originally released on cassette in 1987, Bad Is Beautiful was their first compact disc, in 1991. It features the song "Not Dead Yet" which received extensive commercial airplay on Chicago radio stations WXRT and WLUP and remains an active part of the former's library. Styx also covered "Not Dead Yet" on their 1990 release Edge of the Century and performed the song in concert for that album's tour. The song is also featured in an episode of season three of Six Feet Under ("The Trap") and has been arranged by Tom Wallace for marching band. The Bad Examples had three chart singles in the Netherlands in 1991 and toured there several times.

The band's newest album, Smash Record, was released on January 11, 2011.

Bassist Tom "Pickles" Piekarski died of a heart attack in August 2013. Ralph's World bass player Brian Sheridan currently plays bass for The Bad Examples.

== Discography ==
Ralph Covert & The Bad Examples:

- MEAT: The Bad Examples
- Bad is Beautiful
- Cheap Beer Night (live)
- Kisses 50¢
- Popscape: The Best of Ralph Covert & The Bad Examples
- The Two-Meter Sessions: Live on Radio VARA, Jan. 9, 1992
- Good Examples of Bad Examples - The Best of Ralph Covert & The Bad Examples, Vol. 2
- Smash Record

Ralph Covert:

- Eat At Godot's
- Adam McCarthy (EP)
- Songwriter Series Volume 1 (acoustic)
- Songwriter Series Volume 2 (acoustic)
- Birthday
