= AnExchange =

American folk rock group

AnExchange was a Marin County-based, folk-rock group of the late 1960s, playing opening acts at San Carlos's Circle Star Theater for Ike & Tina Turner, The Everly Brothers and Joan Baez at the Edmonton Folk Music Festival.

== Career ==
In 1968, the record producer and saxophonist Jack Schaeffer discovered the singer Patty Parsons playing with the acoustic guitarist Dale Jared at Mooneys Irish Pub Sin in San Francisco, and with lead guitarist Dan Anthony (formerly Jaramillo) formed the new group. They regularly performed at San Francisco's Coal Yard and Marin County's Gatsbys, and they were the first group to play at the Mill Valley Sweetwater Saloon, where they regularly performed. Members of Jefferson Airplane caught their act at the Ancient Mariner in Mill Valley. The band was reforming under the name Jefferson Starship, and with Parsons' sound and resemblance to Grace Slick, they asked if she would join the new group. Instead, Dick Anderson of the Sun Valley Company signed the act to play The Ram Restaurant at the Lodge for several ski seasons at a time when they were the only live music. AnExchange's songs included "Cody", written by John Stewart, "California Lights" and "Wind Beneath My Wings", the latter recorded by Bette Midler. Schaeffer was producer and arranger on Why Can't I, Parsons' debut solo album.
