= Royale Monarchs =

American surf band

The Royale Monarchs were a Southern California surf band of the late 1960s, signed by radio personality Bob Eubanks as the house band at his Cinnamon Cinder night clubs, regulars on his Hollywood Dance Time and The Cinnamon Cinder television shows.

== History ==
The original group included founder, Dan Anthony, (formerly Jaramillo) vocals and lead guitar, Roger Stafford lead vocal and rhythm guitar, Wilson Smith later replaced by George Haraksin on drums, with Jack Schaeffer on tenor saxophone and Ed Loewe rounding out the group on bass guitar. While playing the sock hops they often performed as backup band for touring recording artist, Jan and Dean, The Hondells or The Honeys. While at the Cinnamon Cinder they backed up weekly such acts as Jackie DeShannon, Dick and Dede, The Ronettes, Little Stevie Wonder, The Coasters, The Rivingtons and Chuck Berry.

Producer Gary Usher signed the newly reformed group, The Forte' Four to a recording contract at MCA/Universal and released several singles on Decca Records. Ernie Earnshaw, of Love Song took over on drums and Guy Watson on bass in the new group. Guitarist Glen Campbell joined as a session musician on recordings adding back up harmony along with Usher. The group's first single under the Royale Monarchs name was "Sombrero Stomp", featuring Schaeffer on tenor sax.

Roger Stafford died on January 27, 2012, in Visalia, California, following complications after kidney failure. He was aged 69.

== Discography ==
=== Royale Monarchs ===
- Whole Lot of Shakin Going On (1962) (Dell)
- Sombrero Stomp (1962) (Dell)
- The Cinnamon Cinder Show / Bob Eubanks (1963–65) (TV)
- My Babe (1964) (Dell)
- (Hey) Surfs Up (1964) (Dell)
- Great Balls of Fire (1964) (Dell)
- Teen Scene (1964) (Dell)
- Cinnamon Cinder Show Christmas Special / Bob Eubanks (1965) (TV)

Collector-oriented compilation albums containing their tracks

- At The Rockhouse, vol 11 (Eagle)
- Red Hot Rock 'N' Roll (Red Hot)
- High School Favorites (Teen)
- I Want Rock (White Label)

=== The Forte Four ===
- Can't You See I'm Trying (1966) (Decca)
- Don't Let The Sun Shine On Me (1966) (Decca)
- I Don't Wanna Say Goodnight (1966) (Decca)
- The Climb (1966) (Decca)
- Viva Las Vegas, Original Soundtrack / "The Climb" (1964) (MGM)
- The Cool Ones, Original Soundtrack (1967) (Warner Bros)
