= Ernie Earnshaw =

American drummer

Ernie Earnshaw is a musician and recording artist. He began playing drums with the Royale Monarchs. The Monarchs were a popular surf-band of the 1960s, at the Bob Eubanks Cinnamon Cinder night clubs, in Los Angeles and performed on Sam Riddell's Ninth St. West Dance Program. Producer Gary Usher signed the new reformed group The Forte' Four to a recording contract at Decca Records. Two singles were released without much fanfare, and when The Forte IV broke up, Ernie met and auditioned for Six the Hard Way, a group of three singers and three pieces which went on the road and stayed there through 1967. When Six the Hard Way broke up, Ernie and Chuck Girard went back to Pasadena where Chuck started writing, and eventually Chuck Girard, Jack Schaeffer, Ernie and a couple of Chuck's friends recorded two demos, "Feel the Love" and "Enchanted Forest." These were the beginnings of what many consider the first Christian Rock group. Earnshaw left this band in the spring of 1968, joining BigFoot, which became Bill Medley's band in the summer of 1970.

At the end of that year, the gig with Bill Medley dried up, so Earnshaw loaded his VW Beetle and headed north. In the spring of 1971, he joined a band in the act of making their debut album. They were The Wackers, a band that had grown out of a songwriting partnership consisting of Bob Segarini and Randy Bishop, late of the band, Roxy. Based in Eureka California, where they'd encountered Michael Stull, with his baritone voice and Rickenbacker "Double Six," and William "Kootch" Trochim on bass. The Wackers played local clubs and did the occasional live unplugged show on various radio stations. In 1972, The Wackers moved to Montreal, Quebec and became very popular by playing many high-school and college dances.

In the Fall of 1973, unrest and reorganization in the record business caused Elektra to drop many acts from their rosters. Earnshaw returned to Humboldt County and played steadily in nightclubs, street fairs, weddings and such. In addition Earnshaw played drums on several local recording projects, including albums and demos.

Earnshaw's most significant moments during this period were with Rolling Bob, featuring the vocalist, Larry Lampi, the Doug Marcum on guitars/vocals, and Ken Susan on bass/vocals. Formed in 1976, this band is still playing occasionally. On July 24, 2011 in Toronto, The Wackers strapped it on again with a 1 hour and 45 minute set, and sources report that the band "......like totally rawked, dude!"
