= AUDIX =

Voicemail server

AUDIX (AUDio Information EXchange) is a voicemail server intended to be used with a Lucent/Avaya private branch exchange (PBX). AUDIX features many integrations with Avaya PBXes, such as capturing the extension of the calling party and announcing that person's name (if they're also an AUDIX subscriber and have recorded their name on the system) when announcing the attributes of a message, automatic identification of subscribers when they are dialing in to retrieve their messages, and activating and deactivating message-waiting indicators.

It can also serve as a recording device. A subscriber with an appropriately administered feature button on their phone can press said button and within a few seconds, the station will be conferenced with AUDIX and AUDIX will record the conversation. The recording will be stored like a voice mail.

AUDIX systems are based on Unix, and share some software with Avaya's Conversant interactive voice response (IVR) platform. Early forms of unified messaging appeared in the late 1980s; earlier AUDIX releases interoperated with System V mail servers and with System 85 PBXes, when AT&T still owned UNIX. Many of the same status and control programs are used to operate AUDIX and Conversant systems, but an AUDIX system is geared specifically to serving up voicemail and is not a general IVR platform.

== See also ==
- Avaya Definity
- Voicemail
