= The Wackers =

American rock band

The Wackers was an American folk rock band formed in 1970, out of another band, Roxy. Though short-lived the band was moderately successful, releasing three studio albums.

== Career ==
Singer/songwriter Bob Segarini and multi-instrumentalist Randy Bishop disbanded Roxy and joined with singer-guitarist-keyboardist Michael Stull to form the new group in Eureka, California. Bassist Bill 'Kootch' Trochim and drummer Spencer Earnshaw completed The Wackers line-up to record the debut album Wackering Heights, produced by Gary Usher. Following the success of the tracks "Travelin' Time" and "Body Go Round", the band toured Canada and the United States.

The next year (1972), the band moved to Montreal, Canada around the time that they released their sophomore LP Hot Wacks to good reviews. The album, recorded at Andre Perry Studios, and produced by Gary Usher, featured "I Hardly Know Her Name" and a cover of John Lennon's "Oh My Love". Billboard, April 15, 1972, had this to say about "Hot Wacks":

The Wackers have been wackering around for a long time with only a modicum of success; this album may well rectify that state of affairs. Their music is penetratingly electrifying, their songs possessing an unusual built-in compulsion. This album contains some lingeringly lovely efforts, ("Oh My Love" and "Do You Know the Reason") as well as ripplingly up-tempo numbers ("I Hardly Know Her Name" and "Breathe Easy.")

Comparing them favorably to the Hollies, the Beatles, and Crosby, Stills, Nash and Young, Bill Mann, Montreal Gazette, called The Wackers, "one of the tightest singing groups around," adding, "theirs is a vocal alphabet soup with a little bit of everything thrown in (with the letters spelling "Sho good listening")."

Most of side two of the album was the six-song "Time Will Carry On" suite which reminded the listener of side two of The Beatles' Abbey Road. Mann says,

The next six cuts on Side Two are a fast-moving melody, and The Wackers' transitions from one melody to another are the best I've heard since Sergeant Pepper's. . . . [the title cut] is distinguished by a tough slashing guitar line that is the most distinctive and interesting thing on the album."

Many references to the Hot Wacks LP erroneously refer to songs that do not appear on any Wackers LPs including "Windy Days", "I Got My Friends" and remakes of "New York City" and "Rock and Roll Circus", which were songs from the Roxy album in 1970. The third album, Shredder, was released in 1973 and featured "Day and Night" (a chart single) (#50 CAN) Hey Lawdy Lawdy/I'm In Love (Elektra EK45841, 1973)), "Beach Song", and "Last Dance".

Despite Michael Stull leaving the group shortly after the move to Montreal, and April Wine drummer Jerry Mercer and guitarist JP Lauzon playing on several of the Shredder tracks, Segarini, Trochim, Bishop, and Earnshaw went on to record an unreleased fourth album, "Wack 'n' Roll." Soon after, Earnshaw returned to California and Randy Bishop began a solo career. The Wackers soldiered on for a time with new additions—Leon Holt, Norman Vosko, and Wayne Cullen—and released one single on Polydor Records, "All I Want To Do Is Love You." Segarini, Trochim, and Cullen then formed The Dudes, with original April Wine members David and Ritchie Henman, and future April Wine guitarist Brian Greenway for one album. Bob Segarini went on to enjoy a critically acclaimed solo career and later ventured into TV and radio broadcasting.

The group has no connection with an identically named group from Liverpool who released three singles including "I Wonder Why" in 1964 and 1965.
