= Jess Roden =

English musician (born 1947)

- Born: 28 December 1947 (age 78); Kidderminster, Worcestershire, England
- Genre: Rock
- Occupation: Singer
- Instruments: Vocals; guitar
- Years active: 1966–present
- Label: Island

Jess Roden (born 28 December 1947) is an English rock singer, songwriter and guitarist.

== Biography ==
Roden's first band was The Raiders, followed by The Shakedown Sound which also included the guitarist Kevyn Gammond (later of Band of Joy). He was a member of The Alan Bown Set during the late 1960s, but left after recording the album The Alan Bown! His vocals were re-recorded by his replacement Robert Palmer for the UK release of the album, although Roden's original vocals remained on the US release.

In 2009, Roden began collating, stabilising and digitising the analogue tapes of studio recordings made during his musical career. The resulting songs were released as a 6-CD set, Hidden Masters: The Jess Roden Anthology, in 2013.

== Discography ==
=== Solo ===
- Jess Roden (1974)
- The Player Not the Game (1977)
- Stonechaser (1980)

=== The Jess Roden Band ===
- Keep Your Hat On (1976)
- Play It Dirty, Play It Class (1976)
- Blowin' (1977)
- Live at the BBC (released 1993)

=== Alan Bown ===
- London Swings – Live at the Marquee (1967) One side of an album also featuring Jimmy James & The Vagabonds
- Emergency 999 (CD collection with all the early Alan Bown singles featuring Roden)
- Outward Bown (First Album) (1968)
- The Alan Bown! (1969) (US edition only)

=== Bronco ===
- Country Home (1970)
- Ace of Sunlight (1971)

=== Butts Band ===
- Butts Band (1973)

=== The Rivits ===
- Multiplay (1980)

=== Seven Windows ===
- Seven Windows (1986)

=== The Humans ===
- Jess Roden and The Humans (1995)
- Live at The Robin 1996 (2004)

=== Compilations ===
- The Best of Jess Roden (2009)
- Bronco: Country Home / Ace of Sunlight (2010)
- Outward Bown (2012)
- Hidden Masters: The Jess Roden Anthology 6-CD box set (bonus 6th CD only available with the first pressing) (2013)

=== Other appearances ===
- The Who – "Magic Bus" (backing vocals) (1968)
- Mott the Hoople – Wildlife (backing vocals) (1971)
- Keef Hartley – Lancashire Hustler (lead vocals) (1973)
- Paul Kossoff – Back Street Crawler (lead vocals on "I'm Ready", backing vocals on "Molten Gold") (1973)
- Carol Grimes – Warm Blood (backing vocals) (1974)
- Jim Capaldi – Short Cut Draw Blood (guitar) (1975)
- Stomu Yamashta – Go Too (1977)
- Sandy Denny – Rendezvous (backing vocals) (1977)
- Grace Jones – Nightclubbing (backing vocals) (1981)
- Seven Windows – Seven Windows (1986)
- Peter Green – Rattlesnake Guitar: The Music of Peter Green (vocals on "Crying Won't Bring You Back" and "Merry Go Round") (1995)
- Luther Grosvenor – Floodgates (vocals on "I Wanna Be Free" and "Fire Down Below") (1996)
- SAS Band – (vocals on "That's The Way God Planned It") (1998)
- Sandy Denny – A Boxful of Treasures (duet on "Losing Game") (2004)
