= Becoming Led Zeppelin =

2025 documentary by Bernard MacMahon

- General release poster
- Directed by: Bernard MacMahon
- Screenplay by: Bernard MacMahon; Allison McGourty
- Starring: John Bonham; John Paul Jones; Jimmy Page; Robert Plant
- Cinematography: Vern Moen
- Edited by: Dan Gitlin
- Music by: Led Zeppelin
- Production companies: Allison McGourty; Paradise Pictures
- Distributed by: Sony Pictures Classics
- Release dates: January 27, 2025 (Grauman's Chinese Theatre, Hollywood, CA)
- Running time: 121 minutes
- Countries: United Kingdom; United States
- Language: English
- Box office: $16.8 million

Becoming Led Zeppelin is a 2025 musical documentary film directed and written by Bernard MacMahon and written and produced by Allison McGourty, about the formation and first year of Led Zeppelin. Set against the backdrop of post–World War II England, the film tells the story of the musical apprenticeship of four boys, John Bonham, John Paul Jones, Jimmy Page and Robert Plant, who, inspired by African-American music, travel to the United States in the psychedelic era to pursue their musical ambitions.

Led Zeppelin, who had previously declined all documentary and dramatic film proposals, agreed to participate after viewing McGourty and MacMahon's detailed storyboard and admiring their American Epic films, granting the filmmakers complete artistic freedom and independence to make the film. The meticulous production lasted five years, and was turned down by every major studio. On release it achieved the highest-grossing opening weekend for an IMAX-exclusive music film, and became the highest grossing documentary of 2025. After its theatrical run, Becoming Led Zeppelin was the most streamed music documentary in 2025.

Becoming Led Zeppelin has been praised for its screenplay, innovative directing, the candour of its interviews, the quality of its archive, the inventiveness of its editing and the power of its sound. The film won the 2025 Critics Choice Documentary Award for Best Music Documentary, the International Press Academy Award for Best Documentary, the Cinema Audio Society Award for Outstanding Achievement in Sound Mixing for a Motion Picture Documentary, the 2026 National Film Awards for Best Documentary, was nominated for a Writers Guild of America Award for Best Documentary Screenplay, an ACE Eddie Award for Best Edited Documentary Feature, and has been cited as one of the greatest rock documentaries of all time.

== Plot ==
In 1944, Jimmy Page is born amid the rubble of a Britain devastated by the Nazis during the Blitz. As World War II ends, John Paul Jones queues for rations, while Robert Plant chafes against the country's grey austerity, gazing longingly toward the colour and promise of the United States.

Each band member's childhood is explored. Plant, a singer, is shown as being shaped by his Romani heritage whose parents suppressed his musical ambitions. Jones, a multi-instrumentalist, was raised by vaudeville-performer parents. Page is depicted as a disciplined guitarist encouraged by his mother to perform. Bonham is described as determined to provide for his family. All four cite early inspiration from African American artists such as Sonny Boy Williamson II, Little Richard, and James Brown, with rhythm players Jones and Bonham drawing especially deep influence from jazz and soul.

As teenagers, Page and Jones establish themselves as elite session musicians in London, playing on recordings by Shirley Bassey, Donovan, and Lulu. Meanwhile, Plant and Bonham drift through a series of short-lived bands across the West Midlands of England, unable to find an audience. As their prospects fade, Bonham's wife, Pat, forbids him from associating with Plant, dismissing him as "a disaster." Soon after, Plant's parents cast him out for rejecting a respectable career as a chartered accountant, leaving him homeless.

Page, disillusioned with session work that has devolved into recording monotonous Muzak, quits and joins the Yardbirds alongside his friend Jeff Beck. After Beck's acrimonious exit, Page becomes lead guitarist and pushes the band toward a heavier sound inspired by American underground FM radio, but the group reject his overtures and desert him.

Determined to rebuild, Page resolves to form a new line-up under the Yardbirds' name. He auditions the homeless Plant at his Pangbourne boathouse, where they rehearse Joan Baez's "Babe I'm Gonna Leave You" and are inspired. Plant recommends John Bonham. Despite Pat's fierce objections, Bonham agrees to join after being offered a higher weekly wage. Encouraged by his wife, Mo, John Paul Jones contacts Page and abandons his lucrative session career to complete the line-up.

In the summer of 1968, Bonham, Jones, Page and Plant convene for their first rehearsal – an experience Page calls "life-changing," and Jones recalls as explosive. They rehearse in Pangbourne and embark on a Scandinavian tour as the Yardbirds. Audiences are left nonplussed by the unexpected force of the music, but the band is convinced of its power. They immediately record their first album, the eponymous Led Zeppelin, at their own expense. Page, Jones, and Bonham lock in effortlessly, while Plant – recording his vocals separately – is intimidated singing over such virtuosity.

No British record label will release the album, so Page and his formidable manager, Peter Grant, fly to New York City to secure a deal with Atlantic Records. Renamed Led Zeppelin, the band still confounds European audiences, and promoters refuse to book them. Atlantic Records schedules the album for a U.S. release only, and sends the band to America on Christmas Eve for their first tour. In January 1969 at San Francisco's Fillmore West, Grant warns Plant, "If you don't crack it here, it's over." The band performs ferociously, igniting the counterculture crowd. As Zeppelin tours from the West Coast to the East, underground radio plays the entire album on air, selling out shows through word of mouth.

They return to Britain exhilarated – only to face a wave of negative American reviews attacking the album and each member personally. Stung, the band vow to never engage with the press, appear on television or release singles, choosing to reach their audience solely through live performances and albums.

With a British release finally secured, Led Zeppelin promotes the album through concerts which highlights their musical improvisational skills. They immediately plan to record another album that is more sonically and musically expansive than the first and to lean into their audience and take inspiration from it by recording on the road.

For months they tour back and forth across America and the UK snatching short recording sessions when they can. The intensive touring, travelling on commercial flights and getting lost driving the back-roads of North America, puts a strain on the lives of Bonham, Jones and Plant who have very little time to spend with their wives and young children. The energy from audience reactions sustain them as the tour takes the group from concert halls to outdoor festivals, like the Newport Jazz Festival where Bonham's drumming draws the admiration of his childhood heroes, James Brown's drummers Clyde Stubblefield and Jabo Starks. Page and Plant nervously build a songwriting partnership with Page working to inspire Plant's nascent lyric writing through his music. Plant reaches into the heritage of his Midlands home for his lyrics and writes "Ramble On", a song which he says is "the story of my life." When the recording is complete, Page mixes the album with dramatic stereo effects and inserts a long avant-garde section into the most commercial track "Whole Lotta Love" to prevent it from being released as a single.

In October 1969, with no TV, no AM radio, and almost no press, Led Zeppelin II is released and climbs the Billboard 200 charts in the United states, replacing The Beatles' Abbey Road in the number one US album spot. Returning home for a concert at the Royal Albert Hall, the band find the venue sold out, their families present, and a British audience in rapture. After the performance, Jones, Page and Plant listen to John Bonham's voice for the first time in forty years, talking about his feelings for each of them and reflecting on their musical bond. Jimmy Page summarises their philosophy, stating "if you have something that you know is different in yourself, then you have to put work into it. You have to work and work and work. You also have to believe in it. But as long as you can stay really true, your aim is true, you can realise your dreams. I do believe that. I believe that that can be done, because this is what happens."

== Production ==
=== Development ===
Becoming Led Zeppelin is a sequel to American Epic, a series of films made by McGourty, MacMahon and Executive Producer Duke Erikson on the first recordings of roots music in the United States during the 1920s and their cultural, social and technological impact on North America and the world. Made with the support of Robert Redford, who called it "America's greatest untold story", American Epic was acclaimed as one of the greatest music documentaries ever made.

McGourty, MacMahon and Erikson planned for the sequel to cover the cultural and technological expansion in musical recording and distribution from World War II to 1970. Rather than researching 100 artists as they had for American Epic, MacMahon suggested looking to see if there was one musical act that was "the embodiment of that final stage of 20th-Century music" and whose story had not been told in a film before."

As an 11-year-old, MacMahon had read a paperback book by author Howard Mylett about the origins of the group Led Zeppelin, and although he had not heard their music, he was inspired by their story of musical apprenticeship and struggle, which "had this feeling of quests I loved as a kid, like Jason and the Argonauts or the Odyssey". After listening to Led Zeppelin's recordings in the ensuing years, MacMahon was confident they would make a powerful cinematic soundtrack, because "Zeppelin dealt in dynamics, that was their language". He suggested their story to McGourty as their next film, rationalising that Led Zeppelin were a significant force in the dissemination of music in the late 1960s, they had never told their story before, and their story would be inspiring to young people. "Will a 13-year-old kid get something from [this film]? Will it be instructional for their life? That's what we care about", MacMahon explained, adding that making documentary films was such intensive work that he was only interested if the subject had not been tackled before.

"I always felt this was a self-contained story. In January 1970 they have become the most popular band in North America and now return to Britain. In that closing song the audience now accept them as returning heroes. All the band's families are there and this is the coming together of their childhood story."

— Bernard MacMahon

McGourty and MacMahon set the film in the 26 years between January 1944 and January 1970, tracing the musical apprenticeship of four British boys inspired by African American music, who, facing disinterest in their home country, have to travel to the United States during the psychedelic era to pursue their musical ambitions. Despite antipathy from the media and most of their peers, through dedication to their craft, tenacity and collaboration they achieve global recognition, culminating in a triumphant homecoming concert at the Royal Albert Hall. MacMahon has said this formative period inspired him because it demonstrated how seemingly impossible goals could be realised, and that he had not seen a film that showed young people how with hard work and perseverance they could achieve the same. He explained:

"Most films deal with compartmentalizing things that do really well as, ‘Oh, it's genius.' And I look at genius like a pejorative term. Because it's essentially saying your forehead was touched by some spiritual force, and while other people work, you were given this thing. Actually, what this film is about is you're not given this thing; you have to work really hard at it, and nothing is handed to you on a plate, and you've gotta get out there and meet people and interact and do all these things. I think that the difference of this film… is that you start from this point where these kids are no different from you. You see Jimmy [Page] on that little TV show that his mum managed to get him on, and he just barely played two chords and it comes to the solo, he just jiggles around a bit and whistles; he can't play a lead line yet. At that point you see a kid that is literally just at the most simple level of competency, doing his thing, and John [Bonham] is tapping this one little snare and cymbal with his brother strumming away on the guitar. Those guys are like you, but the difference is that they keep at it."

McGourty and MacMahon wanted the film to show that the group's early success was the result of intense musical discipline from childhood, dedication and collaboration, in contrast to biographies, published after the group's demise that concentrated on the group's excesses in later years which did not shape their early musical identity or contribute to their creative breakthrough. MacMahon noted "the beginnings of stories are the most informative to the audience, to the young audience, the most helpful and they're the most inspiring", adding, "with those very, very rare phenomena like Led Zeppelin, the moment they become… hugely popular, wonderful as that music might be, the story in the latter period becomes less and less relevant to other human beings because you're in such a rarified zone, but at the beginning everyone can relate to that because you could be the person on that journey".

McGourty said that she, MacMahon and editor Dan Gitlin spent seven months researching and creating thorough timelines of each band member's life. For period context they undertook 175 background interviews with people present during the film's time-period, this ranged from childhood friends and mentors like Rod Wyatt, to record producers and engineers such as Shel Talmy and Glyn Johns, to fact checking with musical peers such as Vic Flick, the James Bond guitarist, to confirm that John Paul Jones and Jimmy Page recorded on the "Goldfinger" session with him.

As McGourty and MacMahon planned for musical numbers to be key milestones in the story, they searched for never-before-seen performances and higher quality masters of those that had been seen, as well as looking for every "fragment of archival footage we could find". As John Bonham had died in 1980, and was notoriously press shy and no usable filmed or taped interview was known to exist, the filmmakers were concerned that it might not be possible for him to have a voice in the film.

=== Screenplay ===
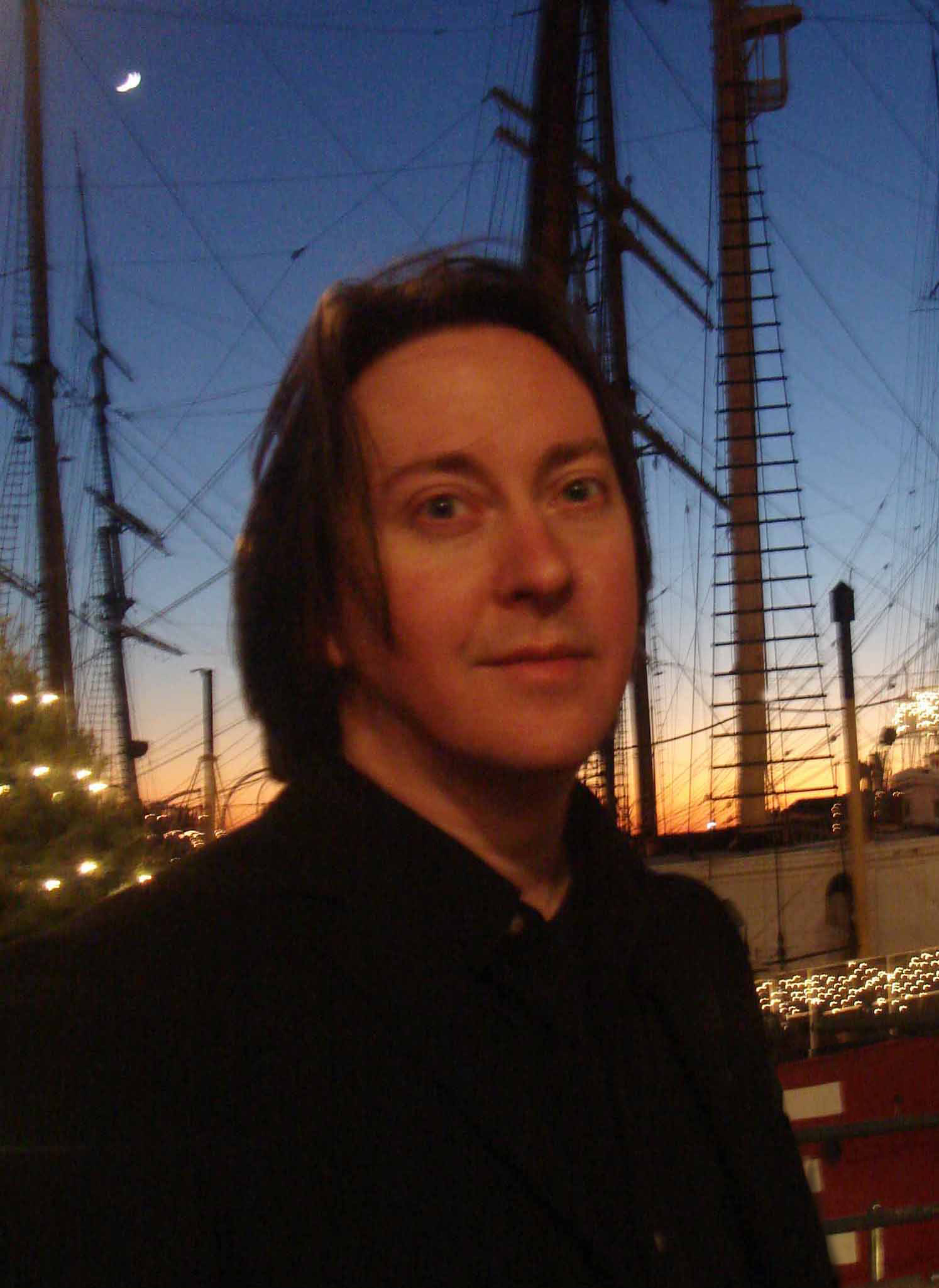
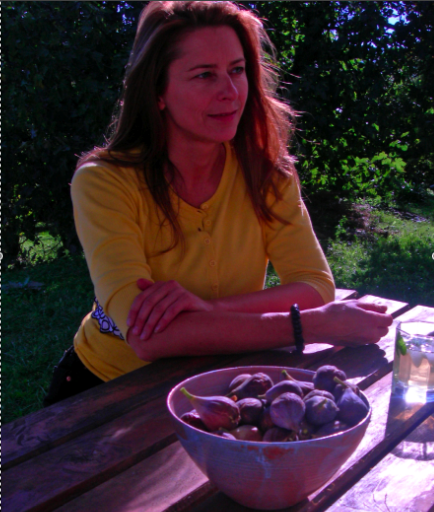
Director Bernard MacMahon co-wrote the screenplay with Producer Allison McGourty.

MacMahon, McGourty and Gitlin read and listened to every extant interview with Led Zeppelin and, from these, McGourty and MacMahon wrote a script utilising quotes from these interviews and improvising dialogue where nothing was available. The film was written with the band members as the sole characters so that audiences could experience them "telling their own stories for the first time".

McGourty and MacMahon wrote the screenplay with Hollywood musicals as "the reference points, not documentaries". MacMahon's idea was to write a film that "when I was 13 or 14, I would happily see three or four times a year at the Brixton Ritzy". To fulfil this, they scripted the film around complete musical performances, giving it a structural arc that would encourage repeated viewing. Taking inspiration from the musicals of the Golden Age, the musical performances were sequenced so that their lyrics would advance the story. McGourty explained that "Communication Breakdown" depicts the group performing to bewildered European audiences, "Your Time Is Gonna Come" illustrates their securing of a record deal in the United States, and "Ramble On" accompanies their myriad travels across America and Europe.

MacMahon said he and McGourty wrote the script with a female audience in mind. "Women drive the culture" McGourty explained, with MacMahon adding that "it's women that launch the things that are meaningful because they are more instinctual about things they're interested in". They stressed that it was Jimmy Page's mother Patricia who encouraged his musical ambitions and secured his first BBC TV appearance, John Paul Jones's wife Mo who insisted he quit his lucrative session career to join the band, and how female audiences were essential to the band's rise.

Because of their prior research while making American Epic, McGourty and MacMahon wanted the screenplay to prominently feature the African-American musicians that influenced Led Zeppelin, and scripted extended performances by Little Richard, Sonny Boy Williamson II, James Brown, and Shirley Bassey to allow the Led Zeppelin band members to give in-depth acknowledgement of their influences. MacMahon noted that the group's first performance is positioned as a fruition of all the African-American musical elements introduced in the film's opening act.

The script took seven months to write and was completed before Led Zeppelin were contacted. McGourty remarked that, "people said we were crazy, that they'd never agree to it".

Upon completion of the script, MacMahon and Gitlin created a storyboard that was "only images, not a single word of text" and MacMahon committed "every name, every place" and date to memory in preparation for meeting the band.

=== Approaching Led Zeppelin ===
For 50 years, Led Zeppelin had never wanted or agreed to a film biography. Jimmy Page revealed he had "immediately recoiled" from every film pitch the group had received, describing them all as "miserable" and "concentrating on anything but the music". MacMahon thought it was "incredibly likely" that "we would not even get a meeting". McGourty responded, "but that's part of the challenge, isn't it?"

When McGourty and MacMahon contacted Jimmy Page they discovered that he was "a big admirer" of their American Epic films and "talked at great length about how much he'd loved them". Page agreed to a presentation of the storyboard which MacMahon conducted entirely from memory and lasted seven hours. McGourty explained that it "was a bit like an exam" where Page would ask questions like "what was the name of that group that Robert was singing with when I first met him?" When MacMahon replied: "Obs-Tweedle" without missing a beat, Page told him "very good, carry on".

Later in the presentation, as they were discussing dates, Page "went to these bags he'd brought by the door, poured the contents over the table, and he'd come with all his diaries going back to 1963". MacMahon said he believed that if he hadn't been so prepared, "that meeting could have lasted 20 minutes or an hour and those bags would never have been opened".

Following the presentation, Page asked McGourty and MacMahon "how would you like to go to Pangbourne with me?", and accompanied the filmmakers to see his boathouse where the band had rehearsed and which he had not visited since 1970.

After meeting McGourty and MacMahon, Page stated that "the conduit was the storyboard and certainly for me because it was so accurate and the research had obviously been so deep that… I thought ‘well, they've really got it. They really understand what it was about'".

When McGourty and MacMahon approached John Paul Jones, his manager initially declined a meeting. Undeterred, they requested that John watch the first twenty minutes of American Epic, telling the manager "if he's not interested, you'll never hear from us again". A day later they received a call saying that Jones would like to meet.

At the meeting MacMahon recalls Jones saying that he "made a pilgrimage to the Maces Spring in Virginia,'" where he met the people that McGourty and MacMahon had interviewed for the Carter Family story in American Epic. After hearing this, MacMahon felt that Jones "was this kindred spirit".

MacMahon described the meeting as a "great joy" and Jones, who was the son of vaudeville entertainers, as a "terrific raconteur". MacMahon recalled thinking, "my God, if we can get this guy on the screen, we have gold here 'cause he's so charismatic and interesting and entertaining". At the end of the presentation Jones said "by the way this is me excited. When can we start?" He concurred with Page that "the time was right" to tell their story.

For almost 40 years, Robert Plant had pursued a solo career, and distanced himself from Led Zeppelin's legacy even going so far as to say in 1990, "I don't know the guy who sang in Led Zeppelin". McGourty and MacMahon anticipated Plant would be the most reticent to participate in a documentary.

MacMahon credited Justin Adams, Robert Plant's longtime musical collaborator, with establishing the filmmaker's credibility with Plant and arranging for them to meet backstage at his concert in Perth, Scotland. MacMahon said Adams had kept Plant, an avid American roots music fan, abreast of their American Epic research, so that when they were introduced to Plant he said how much he loved American Epic and inquired what they were planning to do next. MacMahon replied, "Funny, you mentioned that, we're thinking of doing Led Zeppelin". MacMahon recalled Plant looking a "bit non-plussed", and proceeded to show him documentation confirming the long-mysterious address of Led Zeppelin's first rehearsal on Gerrard Street. MacMahon recalls Plant, upon parting, saying "I'm interested, come and meet me in Sheffield, England".

In Sheffield, the opportunity to talk was limited, but Plant urged them to come to his show at the Orpheum Theatre in Los Angeles. There, McGourty and MacMahon waited for "almost two hours" as Plant greeted everyone else in the packed green room, "it was really nerve wracking" recalled McGourty. As the room eventually emptied and all that remained was them, Plant, and his manager, Plant approached and asked "Are we going to do this thing?", he then suggested McGourty and MacMahon meet him in Birmingham, England. At that meeting, Plant arrived with an unexpected guest – Pat Bonham, John Bonham's widow. MacMahon said "no one on earth knows John Bonham better than Pat, and so I presented the film to her at the same time as Robert and she was really, really sweet and she arrived with all these unseen photographs of him".

As McGourty and MacMahon presented the storyboard, Plant was visibly enthused when he realised the film covered their childhoods and the first year of Led Zeppelin. MacMahon recalled Plant saying that this was a "very special period in the band for me when it was all starting". McGourty said Plant "looked me in the eye, and he said, ‘How are you gonna tell this story? There's just no footage from that time'," and "you can't have John [Bonham] in it surely". Plant's concerns were allayed when McGourty reminded him they had "just managed to make a six-and-a-half-hour story out of American Epic from 1926, before there was even sound or talking pictures... if anyone can do it, we can". With that, Plant and Pat Bonham signed on to participate in the film, with Plant explaining later that "seeing Will Shade, and so many other important early American musicians, brought to life on the big screen in American Epic" had inspired him to contribute to the film.

When Led Zeppelin asked how the production would proceed, MacMahon replied, "it's got to be an independent movie". McGourty said that "to their credit they agreed" and gave the filmmakers "complete creative freedom", adding "they trusted us because of all the preparation that had been done".

=== Archival search ===
One of the biggest challenges the production faced was the scarcity of known archival material of Led Zeppelin from their pre-band lives and first year, prompting the group to question if a feature length film could be made. MacMahon stated, "there are no interviews with them. Just fragments. And film footage is incredibly rare for a group that sold 300 million records. They didn't do TV. They didn't do promo. For the Led Zeppelin II album, I counted seven or eight [press] interviews – and this was the biggest band in the world!"

A global search was undertaken to locate every possible fragment of moving image and sound. McGourty, MacMahon and Gitlin compiled comprehensive records of concerts, television appearances, interviews, and photo sessions, then tracked down attendees, crew-members, and collectors who might possess surviving materials. Over time, virtually every extant piece of media from the period was uncovered, totalling over 6,600 elements, including previously unseen 8mm and 16mm films, rare videotapes, hundreds of press articles and advertisements, ticket stubs, posters, and photographs. The research team, including researchers Kate Griffiths and Rich Remsberg, aimed to ensured that every piece of contextual b-roll, from recording studios to commercial flights, was period-correct, allowing the film's world to feel historically precise and immersive.

Finding archival audio of John Bonham was important for the film as McGourty and MacMahon said "it was absolutely vital that we get to hear and feel this man, that we get to spend time with him". MacMahon added that he wanted to liberate Robert Plant from "having to speculate on what John thought", something he had been asked to do since Bonham's death in 1980, so MacMahon's "dream was, can we have John talking for himself?" MacMahon revealed that he initially had no idea how they would do this, as there were no known professionally recorded interviews of John Bonham other than two or three sentences, so an extensive search for interviews of Bonham was undertaken. Through months of research and the help of the National Film and Sound Archive of Australia in Canberra, an audio interview "that had been mislabelled so nobody knew existed," from the Sydney radio station 2SM with Sydney broadcaster Graeme Berry was discovered and became the backbone of Bonham's dialogue in the script, supplemented by two shorter US interviews. MacMahon said that finding the tapes was "miraculous" and that their contents were revelatory because Bonham was speaking from "the time" about events the other members hadn't touched on, such as nobody wanting "to book the band in their home country", and about his initial feelings for his bandmates and how at that point they "barely know each other". Through Bonham's sister Deborah, a major archival discovery was made – home movies of John Bonham filmed by his father Jack, including footage of a ten-year-old Bonham playing his first drum kit. McGourty said that through these discoveries "we were able to tell his story equally".

MacMahon's goal was for the audio of the film to bring the viewer as close as possible to the experience heard by the public in the 1950s and '60s. Despite having access to master tapes and numerous digital remasters, they also wanted to explore using the sound of the original commercially released records.

MacMahon, McGourty, Gitlin and sound supervisor Nick Bergh elected to bring all the original audio elements into their Burbank facility to transfer on their proprietary equipment to ensure the highest quality was achieved. These elements covered a wide range of audio media, such as 35mm optical, 35mm mag, 16mm optical, 16mm mag, two-inch, one-inch video, 78rpm records, lacquer discs, 45rpm singles, 33rpm albums, and various more typical tape formats. Working with archives to release their masters was a production challenge, as archives rarely allow materials to leave their premises. MacMahon said, "the number one thing is getting the material into Endpoint [Bergh's studio] with Nick, so he's doing the transfer and we have the master ourselves. And the most difficult thing in doing this film was: how do you do that? Because it is normally against all archival policy to have masters travelling around the world to some facility 5000 miles away. This is normally just not done".

The US National Archives gave permission to allow their lacquers of Herbert Morrison's commentary of the Hindenburg disaster to leave their facility for the first time in 80 years and be brought to Bergh's facility for transfer. Although this commentary was ultimately not used in the film, the loan was so significant that it gave the production the confidence to request the loan of masters from archives worldwide, and also gave the archives the confidence required to allow this to happen.

=== Filming ===
Interview filming for Becoming Led Zeppelin took place over one week in August 2018, on the fiftieth anniversary of Led Zeppelin's first rehearsal. MacMahon stated that for the interviews he wanted the audience "to feel as if they had been invited to this old English house where these men were going to sit down with you and tell you their story for the first time in 50 years".

MacMahon said that when the band members arrived he "could tell they were ready to tell their story enthusiastically" and that all three brought "bags of photographs I'd never seen before" and unreleased recordings that would subsequently feature prominently in the film, including Robert Plant's lacquer of "Memory Lane", a song he had written and recorded with John Bonham in early 1968.

"It's the first time they've all agreed to talk candidly and openly about their life, where they came from, who they are, their families. And they're telling you all this – It's really completely unselfconscious, guileless interviews, and I think they're unique. I haven't really seen interviews like this in a music film before."

— Bernard MacMahon,

Each band member was interviewed separately and only one day was allocated for each interview, a decision MacMahon believed would create a more immediate and candid atmosphere. He explained that Led Zeppelin were encouraged to recount their story continuously in real time, over many hours, without revisiting or reconsidering earlier answers. MacMahon stated that this method helped produce more spontaneous reflections and allowed the audience to gain a clearer sense of the musicians' personalities and recollections of events. MacMahon's goal was for their recollections to feel immediate, presenting events as if they were unfolding in real time. To achieve this, MacMahon, McGourty and Gitlin assembled extensive archival materials including unseen photographs, flyers, newspaper articles, ticket stubs and film clips from the musicians' childhoods through the band's first year and presented these during the interviews to prompt memories and encourage candid responses while "they are walking you through the story, as they hit each new obstacle … they are reliving it". MacMahon noted that "if you can surprise the subjects of the film with the archive you've found that they haven't seen and heard before, then that tells me you're on the right track". MacMahon said that the goal was to encourage the interviewees to "think like when you were 14" and to relive their first rehearsal with "the wonder of meeting these people for the first time." McGourty observed that the interviews were "like time travel". Page and Jones's interviews were conducted by MacMahon, while Plant's was conducted by McGourty who had developed a "really nice shorthand" with him.

An additional exterior interview with Page was filmed beside the river in Pangbourne, opposite his former boathouse where the band had rehearsed. Page described contributing to the documentary as a "wonderful experience".

The interviews were shot by cinematographer Vern Moen on an Arri Alexa using vintage prime lenses. A single camera mounted on a dolly was used throughout, moving subtly and continuously to simulate the feeling of being in the room with the interviewee. The camera avoided extreme close-ups and remained in gentle motion to mirror the natural rhythm of face-to-face conversation.

During post-production, additional filming was undertaken to capture period memorabilia associated with the band's early career. McGourty noted that the production filmed "everything – like the tickets dropping, like the newspapers opening that you see – to propel the story forward". These materials were incorporated into montage sequences throughout the film to illustrate the rapid pace of the group's touring during 1968–1969, with MacMahon noting that the sequences were intended to convey the "freneticism" of the band's first year. All the ephemera filmed were authentic original pieces, either borrowed from Led Zeppelin collectors, on loan from local libraries and institutions, or purchased by the production.

== Post production ==
=== Editing ===
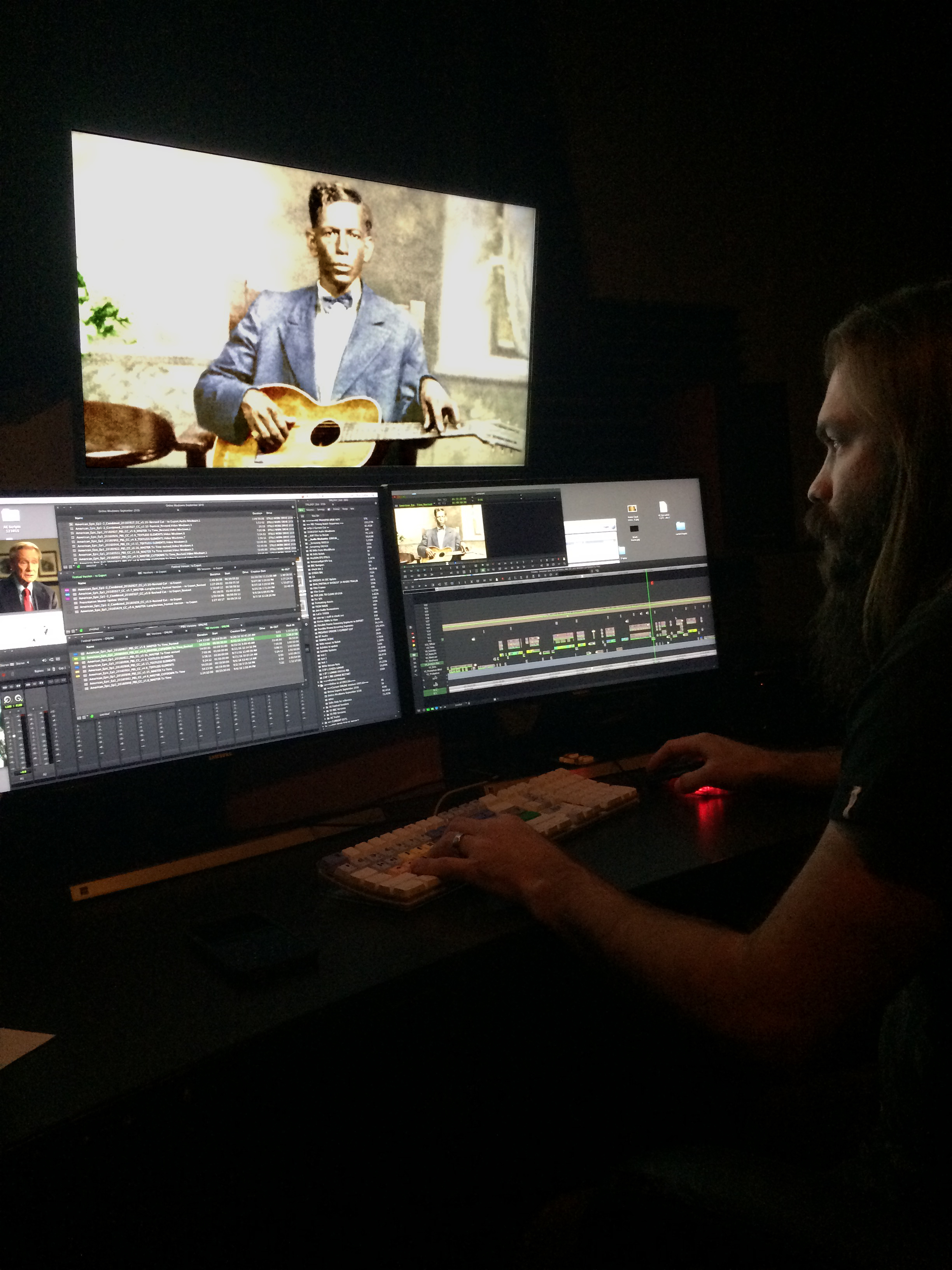
Becoming Led Zeppelin film editor Dan Gitlin

Becoming Led Zeppelin was edited by Dan Gitlin who was the supervising editor on American Epic. Gitlin was involved from the pre-production stages of the film, helping MacMahon create the storyboard, participating in the field research and attending the band interviews.

The film's editorial began in 2019 and continued until 2024, with a hiatus during the Covid-19 lockdown. During the pandemic it was impossible to test screen the rough cut of the film in Los Angeles where the production was based. As test screenings were part of MacMahon and Gitlin's process, McGourty submitted the work-in-progress cut to the 2021 78th Venice International Film Festival where the unfinished film was screened, with Jimmy Page in attendance, and received a 10-minute standing ovation. MacMahon stated, "Venice was an opportunity for us to sit in a large theatre and watch the film and figure out what we needed to cut. I like sitting in audiences, particularly audiences where there's a large number of people that are either neutral or very unfamiliar with the subject. And to have that stress of being in that room, because it gives me a very acute eye of what's on the screen". Executive Producer David Kistenbroker said, "we knew the film was not going to be released after Venice, we still had much more work we wanted to do on it. But the timing was right to get the rough cut out if you will. We still had at least a couple of more years of work to do to get it ready".

Becoming Led Zeppelin utilises editorial styles and techniques reminiscent of musicals and films of the Golden Age of Hollywood, with MacMahon, McGourty and Gitlin citing Singin' in the Rain and Mr. Smith Goes to Washington as well as silent films like Sergei Eisenstein's Strike and Abel Gance's Napoleon as inspirations. The editorial techniques employed by Gitlin included the use of full length song performances and montage techniques – such as multiple exposures of archive and newspapers, concert tickets and other ephemera overlaid on top of archival footage – to allow the songs lyrics and the visuals to tell portions of the story rather than having the interviewees explain concepts verbally. "Similar to Frank Capra style films, we add lots of montage work. The newspapers dropping, the tickets dropping, everything you see on the screen is driving the story forward", explained McGourty. The full performances allow for the visuals to build into a psychedelic "fantasia", as MacMahon noted "all the great musicals have a Fantasia sequence. The penultimate track of Singin' in the Rain is this Fantasia that goes psychedelic. It's rubric. It's a part of a musical. So we are delivering that to you".

Where full filmed performances for songs were available these were utilised. Where filmed performances from the correct era did not exist, such as for "Good Times, Bad Times", montages were shown as unsynchronised fragments of Led Zeppelin performances alongside news footage of global events, as well as footage of the clubs and audiences they were performing to, used to provide social and global context. MacMahon had to grapple with how to visualise these songs that are "part of people's hearts", noting that the audience "have so much time invested in these songs that they've played for years and years, so if you create a visual for something that's never had a visual, my dream is can you enhance that song, enrich it".

The small amount of archival footage of the band from the film's period made the creation of these segments difficult. Led Zeppelin were resistant to performing on television throughout their career, and "Peter Grant, their manager, wouldn't allow anyone to film their concerts," McGourty said. "If somebody showed up with a camera, he would rip out the film and eject them from the theater. So there's less footage of them from that early era than any other major act". MacMahon noted that the work to make the film appear like there's a "cornucopia of material" was "very artfully done by our editor Dan Gitlin. It's actually everything that exists from that period". McGourty explained that creating a feature length film from these fragments of archival footage was akin to writing "War And Peace but cutting out all of the words from newspapers".

McGourty and MacMahon wanted a strong female presence on screen throughout the film, noting "it's women that launch the things that are meaningful because they are more instinctual about things they're interested in". MacMahon recalled John Paul Jones echoing this in their conversations, getting "very wistful, almost tearing up, remembering these amazing women dancing at the shows", adding that "he'd be playing his bass and suddenly these women would be dancing and he'd be like, ‘This is so cool.' This feeling of connecting with these girls through music". Gitlin heavily focused on the band's early female audience during performances, drawing from archival clips showing the styles, dances and fashions of the era, along with archival audio of their early female fans calling into radio stations to speak with the band. McGourty commented "it's wonderful for me to see footage of what it was like in those early days. I wish I could have been there".

McGourty and MacMahon noted that throughout the editorial process the film went "through this big arc", but in the end "what you see on the screen, in the movie, is exactly what we presented to [the group] when we first met".

=== Sound ===
MacMahon and sound supervisor Nick Bergh said Becoming Led Zeppelin was envisioned "as a musical" where the music is "a character", and "the audio was just as important as the visuals". To achieve this MacMahon and Bergh insisted that the audio came from historically authentic playback sources to allow the viewer to hear the music in the "purest way possible". One of the biggest technical challenges they faced with the sound was in working with different recording formats, such as tape and vinyl.

The film includes numerous filmed live performances by Led Zeppelin and other musicians, from many sources covering a wide range of audio media including 35mm optical, 35mm mag, 16mm optical, 16mm mag, two-inch, one-inch video and other various tape formats. All the hundreds of sound elements were transferred at Bergh's facility utilising custom made machines. Through Bergh's knowledge of audio preservation he was able to extract audio from sources in ways not possible at most film labs. For example, the live performance of Led Zeppelin's "Communication Breakdown" featured in the film was from a 2-inch quad video tape in SECAM standard, which Bergh transferred on a Studer 2-inch A-827 deck after his research confirmed that the location of the mono track on quad is the same as Track 1 of 16-track 2-inch. Bergh noted, "the fascinating thing about quad video is that the image is never better than standard definition, but the audio is effectively the same as one track of a ¼-inch stereo tape, 70 mils wide, at 15 ips, so it pays to regard it as a master tape to get the best sound".

For the live footage sourced from 35mm and 16mm film optical negatives, such as the performance of "Dazed and Confused", Bergh opted to have a new positive track printed from them, noting that for optical sound this earliest generation is not the best source, because there are distortions built into the negatives to account for how they will be printed. Bergh explained that by creating the new positive track print, "90 percent of the cracks and pops that you would hear by playing the negative would go away. It's ‘artifact-free' restoration. This is because a lot of the scratching that can happen is in the clear area, and they're gone when it turns black on high-contrast print film. It's like a wet gate scan of an image [that fills in scratches]".

The production utilised a unique approach for the commercially released studio recordings where, despite having access to master tapes and numerous digital remasters, they instead chose to use the original vinyl records. Bergh explained, "at the very beginning we did a lot of experimentation as far as what sources were available to us, digital sources, tape sources, disc sources. The conclusion came pretty quick that the discs themselves offer a lot of advantages. So we went all in on that. So anything that's a commercial recording in the film is from a record". He continued, noting that using the original commercially discs is a great way to "to show the audience what was actually heard at the time, because what's on the [master] tape is not fully baked". MacMahon explained that the master tapes are often very "different from what the public heard. The production master was altered from the quarter inch that was made in the studio, then that production master was enormously goosed at the cutting stage by a Bob Ludwig. What the public heard on their record players is not what you would have heard played back in the studio. So, the truest thing is for you to hear the ultimate thing that millions of people bought, in the truest possible way. That's the philosophy of the film".

Bergh transferred a store-stock 45-rpm disc of "Train Kept A-Rollin'" by the Johnny Burnette Rock and Roll Trio. MacMahon recalled that when the transfer was first played back, "the room just exploded," capturing what he described as the "lightning in a bottle" quality of the original disc, which helped to understand the impact the record had on Jimmy Page when he first heard it, saying "It does not require some talking head to explain it – you can hear it first-hand".

Following this protocol with Led Zeppelin's own studio recordings was "a very conscious choice", involving having to source multiple copies of the band's first two albums to find the optimal source. Bergh stated that for Led Zeppelin I "there were many different early pressings" and that the pressings are "radically different in terms of sound and quality. And the best was from George Piros, a classical cutting engineer who came from Mercury [Records]". For Led Zeppelin II the original lacquer cut by mastering engineer Bob Ludwig was found to be the ideal source, but as that version of the album was recalled for being too loud and making the record skip, it was a difficult record to find in pristine quality, as Bergh noted "even a single play can instantly damage the record".

All the records, spanning across 78rpm discs, 45rpm singles, 33rpm LPs and lacquers, were transferred by Bergh utilising proprietary equipment such as an EMT 927 turntable with an arm from SME, and custom electronics by Vladimir Lamb, feeding a Lavry Gold A-D converter for the vinyl records.

According to Bergh, "The approach to the audio is fundamentally just a step back into an earlier era of film sound and sound priorities. The quality of the audio in the film is not accomplished via digital effects or even much modern-era technology at all. Instead, the fidelity is inherent in the source recordings and is primarily a testament to the work of the musicians and sound engineers who made them". No digital processing was used on the film's audio, "there is no broadband denoise anywhere in this film" explained Bergh who continued, "the best restoration is no restoration". The audio from Led Zeppelin I and II did not touch a single plug-in except for the panner.

Grammy Award–winning record producer and audio engineer Peter Henderson oversaw the restoration of the audio which involved "painstakingly" removing any surface noise by manual de-clicking and waveform editing rather than plug-ins. Bergh noted that unlike the minutes that it would take software to do this restoration, Henderson would "spend days" working on a single song to get the best sound.

As all of the musical elements that the team transferred were either mono or stereo, the music had to be adjusted for the 5.1 surround space of contemporary cinemas. For this, Bergh used only the basic multichannel panner in Pro Tools to spread the mix to the centre channel (using divergence) and LFE, or subwoofer, and added very light reverb to the surround channels "to fill in the space". However, the mix doesn't utilise these surround channels all the way through the film, instead letting the soundscape build over the film's duration as MacMahon explained, "you start with this very simple skiffle sound, and Little Richard in this unbelievably powerful mono, and you end up with this enormously expansive sound with [Led Zeppelin's] whole drum kit panned all the way across the picture. You go on the sonic journey that the world took over those two decades".

=== Restoration ===
MacMahon stated that he wanted the film to imbue the viewers with "a sense of time travel" and realised it was possible through the use of archive footage and sound as long as the production stayed "pure to the source". The production "went to extraordinary lengths to track down original negatives and prints", which according to McGourty was "quite a challenge, especially as all of the archival footage was shot over 50 years ago and some of it was never intended to be screened publicly". The filmmakers created new scans of many hours of archival material, to ensure each clip retained its authenticity, "so that in IMAX, these 55-year-old clips and music would look and sound like they came out of the lab yesterday". Due to the age and various levels of storage for the archive, McGourty said that the production was left "with a massive restoration project on the archival footage". The production opted to use manual techniques, rather than automated tools, to restore the footage – cleaning up scratches, dirt, dust and mould which McGourty said "was executed frame by frame manually by the film's brilliant editor Dan Gitlin". MacMahon noted that "over 70,000 frames of footage" were manually restored.

The performance of "Black Mountain Side" in the film contains noticeable damage, and has a lower third graphic stating "Original master tape damaged". Despite the damage, MacMahon was convinced about the power of the clip, so the filmmakers pulled in the help of visual effects artist Melissa Quintas, who worked on American Epic and Avatar, to play a key role in rescuing this prized footage. MacMahon noted that he showed the damaged footage to Jimmy Page who said "‘I really hope that stays in the movie, because it's such an important part of the Led Zeppelin sound'". MacMahon explained that "the whole team worked so hard. Every single frame of that film was sweated over. I mean, every single thing. There's not a single thing that wasn't thought about, worked on, reworked and polished and polished and polished".

== Release ==
=== Distribution ===
Becoming Led Zeppelin encountered resistance finding a distributor and was turned down by every major studio and streamer, with one remarking that "the film wouldn't make four bucks". The studios objected to the use of full song performances by Led Zeppelin and the African American musicians that inspired them, and urged the filmmakers to include pundits and contemporary musicians commenting on the band's legacy, and to continue the film past January 1970 to focus on the excess and debauchery associated with the latter half of their career.

MacMahon believed that a two-hour feature film "that goes deep into it and you really feel it and you really hear it and you really see it" over a film that "skips over 10 years with little excerpts of songs" was the correct path. He felt that playing full songs was integral, stating "if you're making a film about music, then music is the central character, and the viewers – particularly 100 years from now – have got to hear for themselves what this music is".

When the film's sales agents were unable to acquire a deal, McGourty said "we carried on anyway", noting that their struggles "paralleled" those encountered by Led Zeppelin in the film. MacMahon screened Becoming Led Zeppelin for Tom Bernard, co-president and co-founder of Sony Pictures Classics, who had been following the film since 2019. Bernard responded positively, saying "I cannot think of a single movie that more brilliantly draws you into an artist's story, shows you how their music was made, and makes you experience it as if it was brand new. I know it will be inspirational to young people and legacy defining for generations to come". He recounted having "a mind-blowing experience seeing Led Zeppelin for the first time in August 1969 at the Texas International Pop Festival in Grapevine, Texas and it has stayed with me ever since". When MacMahon discovered that Bernard and his vice president of sales, Tom Prassis, had both seen Led Zeppelin perform in the exact year the film covered, he said "I knew we were in the right place".

Sony Pictures Classics acquired the distribution rights for North America, Latin America, Middle East, South East Asia and sub-licensed the film to Piece of Magic for France, Belgium, Luxembourg, The Netherlands, and Poland. Sony Pictures acquired distribution rights for the United Kingdom and Germany. Altitude Film Sales coordinated distribution for the rest of the world partnering with MadMan Entertainment in Australia and New Zealand, Tohokushinsha Film Corp and Pony Canyon in Japan, Nexo in Italy, NonStop Film in Scandinavia, Cinemart in the Czech Republic and Slovak Republic, and MCF in Former-Yugoslavia.

=== Marketing ===
The marketing campaign for Becoming Led Zeppelin was unconventional for a major theatrical release. MacMahon was informed by the Vice President of Sony Pictures Classics that the distribution and marketing budget would be between $1–1.5 million, a relatively modest expenditure for a high-profile cinema launch, and consistent with the studio's reputation for being frugal.

IMAX release poster for the United States

MacMahon suggested to Tom Bernard that commensurate with their budget "it'd be really cool if the film was introduced like Zeppelin were back then, like it just comes from the underground…and gradually word of mouth spreads. And he took that idea and he ran with it". Bernard approached IMAX, who offered the film an exclusive run in 369 North American cinemas. MacMahon felt this was ideal as the limited number of IMAX theaters mirrored Led Zeppelin's early small theater tours. MacMahon said, "I never in my wildest dreams imagined that our movie would be in IMAX", noting "thank God we did all that work…to get our hands on every single film print, every photograph, and everything's scanned at this extraordinary high level so it could be literally projected on the Empire State Building". MacMahon said that when he first viewed the film at IMAX, "it comes up on the screen and I was like, Jesus, this was made for IMAX".

Unlike traditional film releases, Sony Pictures Classics employed an unconventional strategy that relied heavily on "mystique and word-of-mouth buzz". MacMahon said that Tom Bernard "didn't set up a single review or anything like that, no media. He just invited a bunch of interesting people to come down and watch it in IMAX. These are musicians and film people. And there was no instructions to post on social media. So they just literally told their friends. So that's how the word of the film got out. It was not done through any campaign. It was just like, play it to a bunch of people, and they told other people".

MacMahon created a trailer with editor Dan Gitlin, designed to give away as few specifics about the film as possible. Built around a section of "Whole Lotta Love", suggested by the film's sound engineer Nick Bergh, the trailer was propelled by music and visuals with minimal dialogue. MacMahon said "it's a little bit of a homage to the 1979 Alien trailer, although no one would spot it, but it's in two movements like that".

On 24 October 2024 the trailer appeared unannounced before IMAX screenings of Venom: The Last Dance. The absence of communication, advertising and no way of viewing the trailer other than in IMAX theatres, generated interest, speculation and online dialogue among the audience.

When the film's release date was announced on 5 December 2024, $2 million worth of tickets were purchased in advance, selling out shows for the film's opening weekend. The trailer was released online the same day, with a second trailer released online on 19 December 2024.

MacMahon took issue with Sony Pictures Classics use of the word "authorized" in their media announcements, calling it "misleading and frustrating". He explained, "authorized is a very imprecise word" which can either mean the subjects "are the producers with final cut" or they "have simply granted you a license to use their music and trademark in a documentary, which is what we had". Robert Plant notably described himself as "minorly" involved in the film, and Led Zeppelin did not undertake any promotion for the release of Becoming Led Zeppelin other than providing quotes supporting the production.

=== Theatrical ===
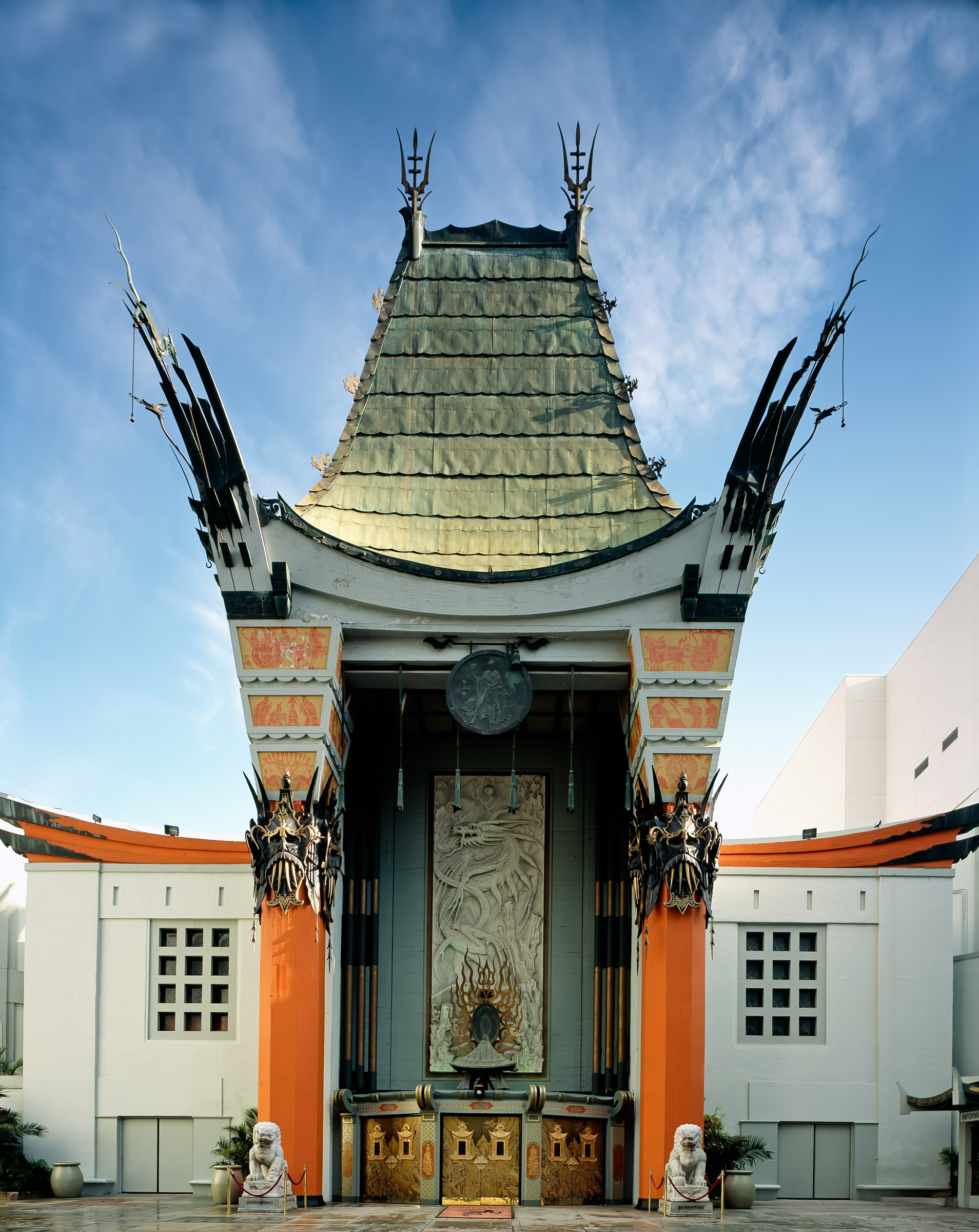
Grauman's Chinese Theatre, Hollywood, venue for the world premiere of Becoming Led Zeppelin

Becoming Led Zeppelin had its world premiere at Grauman's Chinese Theatre in Hollywood on 27 January 2025, and was released in North America exclusively in IMAX cinemas on 7 February, with IMAX Early Access screenings held for two days prior. The film broke the record for the highest-grossing opening weekend for an IMAX-exclusive music film and on 14 February went into wide release in 1,039 theatres across North America. Due to popular demand, the film was re-released by IMAX on 28 February and 2 April 2025.

In the United Kingdom Becoming Led Zeppelin was released exclusively in IMAX on 5 February with a wide release two days later. Spain, Australia and New Zealand released it on 7 February with Poland, the Czech Republic and Slovakia following on 9 February. France released the film on 26 February, with Latin America, the Netherlands and Italy following on 27 February. Germany and Austria released the film on 18 March, Switzerland on 20 March, Belgium on 30 March and Portugal on 15 May. Japan released Becoming Led Zeppelin on 26 September, eight months after its US premiere.

=== Home Media ===
Becoming Led Zeppelin was released on premium video on demand (PVOD) on 4 April 2025, through platforms including Prime Video, Apple TV, and Fandango at Home. On 7 June Becoming Led Zeppelin was released on Netflix in North America.

Becoming Led Zeppelin was first released on 4K resolution Blu-ray in Australia and New Zealand on 18 June 2025 with a 20-page souvenir booklet and slip case which sold out.

On 14 April 2026 a special edition 4K Blu-ray was released in North America and the United Kingdom, in a SteelBook metal-wrapped cover with exclusive memorabilia.

== Reception ==
=== Box office ===
Becoming Led Zeppelin is the highest grossing documentary of 2025 and was the highest grossing music documentary for ten years since Amy in 2015. Becoming Led Zeppelin grossed $10.4 million in the United States and Canada and $6.4 million in other territories, for a worldwide total of $16.8 million. In its North American opening weekend, the film broke the record for the highest-grossing opening weekend for an IMAX-exclusive music film, bringing in $2.6 million. In its IMAX-exclusive opening weekend the film earned a per-theatre total of nearly $7,000, the second-highest of any movie playing in theatres. After the opening weekend, where the Monday box office drop is traditionally over 60%, Becoming Led Zeppelin's Monday gross surpassed its Sunday takings which Adam Blevins at Collider described as "an unprecedented box office feat".

Industry commentators noted that with minimal marketing or publicity Becoming Led Zeppelin's box office performance was achieved mainly through audience enthusiasm and word of mouth and "rocked the box office by treating it like a secret concert event", describing the occurrence as a "box office sensation".

Becoming Led Zeppelin is ranked at number 33 on the Biggest Opening Weekend at the Domestic Box Office for a Limited Release chart, number 70 on the All Time Domestic Box Office for Documentary Movies chart and number 92 on the All Time Worldwide Box Office for Documentary Movies.

=== Home media ===
Becoming Led Zeppelin was the most streamed music documentary of 2025, watched three times more than any other music film, with 550.6 million minutes watched.

=== Critical response ===
Becoming Led Zeppelin received critical acclaim for its direction, interviews, cinematography, archive, editing and sound. The film is certified fresh on the review aggregator website Rotten Tomatoes, with a 95% positive audience rating and 85% positive critics rating, which excluding 2021 reviews of the work-in-progress would increase to 90%. (Note: The Rotten Tomatoes aggregate critic score for Becoming Led Zeppelin was impacted by the inclusion of reviews from the 2021 work-in-progress screening at the 78th Venice International Film Festival, which was substantially longer, at 137-minutes, and contained numerous performances and scenes cut from the commercially released film.) It has been cited as one of the greatest rock documentaries of all time.

Chris Willman of Variety praised Becoming Led Zeppelin as "one of the modern era's great rock docs: lots of cooperation, zero Interference and a director who cared most about the music". Gordon Smart, on BBC, hailed the film as "a documentary masterpiece". Glenn Kenny, at RogerEbert.com, awarded Becoming Led Zeppelin a full four out of four rating saying "I ate it up". Simon Wardell of The Guardian stated that "Bernard MacMahon's terrific, archive-stuffed documentary" as "an extraordinary slice of rock history". Simon Cosyns of The Sun described the film as "a riveting blast of documentary film making at its best".

Critics praised McGourty and MacMahon for securing Led Zeppelin's first-ever on-camera account, a feat long considered unattainable. Marco della Cava, for USA Today, wrote "the amazing thing about Becoming Led Zeppelin is that it shouldn't exist. Suffice it to say the story of convincing these rock giants to talk on camera is about as fascinating as the doc itself". Steve Baltin at Forbes noted Led Zeppelin "do not live in the past. It's rare they've ever stepped back in time. So, for filmmakers Bernard MacMahon and Allison McGourty to get all of them to participate in a magnificent new documentary, Becoming Led Zeppelin, is a great accomplishment".

Sarah Polonsky for Screen Rant, called it "the most definitive account of Led Zeppelin's origins ever put on film". Spencer Kaufman of Consequence wrote that "MacMahon does a superb job of intertwining the stories told by the four Zeppelin members to create one cohesive narrative", with Slate's Jack Hamilton writing "all three men are engaging onscreen presences: funny, insightful, and down-to-earth", praising Jones, as "thoroughly delightful".

Manohla Dargis for the New York Times noted the interview cinematography as "warm, relaxed and, every so often, a touch melancholic. The location visually connects the men, creating a kind of virtual reunion that helps unify the material". Sage Vercos, writing for The Oarsmen, added "these interviews give the audience the feeling of being right there in the room with each of them. Even the John Bonham interview seems like you are just on the phone with him".

Denton Davidson at Gold Derby applauded the way editor Dan Gitlin "worked his magic" to overcome the scarcity of archival footage. ABC's Luke Goodsell praised the "explosive montages that capture Zeppelin's rise". The Oarsmen's Sage Vercos added that "by repeatedly tying the distinctive moments of the group's history with timely footage of worldwide events, the film creates a setting and hints at a metaphor for the incredible impact the band was about to invent". Mike McGranaghan, for The Aisle Seat, wrote how "the editing, superimposed images, and graphics creates a sense of excitement. You don't simply hear the music, you feel it".

Rick Rubin on Tetragrammaton commented that "I've been listening to Led Zeppelin music for as long as it's been around and I've never heard it sound like it sounds in the movie. It is thrilling. Breathtaking". Neil McCormick of The Daily Telegraph noted "the sheer immensity of the sound that comes roaring out of the big speakers, a shuddering assault of electric blues". Christy Lemire of LAist FilmWeek wrote "it's like being at a concert. That sound is incredible". Vulture's Brady Gerber praised the film as "may be the best that Led Zeppelin has ever sounded on film", and "just as compelling with your eyes closed".

Mojo's Andrew Perry described the "potently restored" archive as "simply magnificent". Julian Marszalek and Dave Everly in Classic Rock commended "the amazing footage, photos and artefacts", noting how John Bonham's voice "as crystal clear as if it were recorded yesterday, is startling and moving", and calling the group listening to him "a moment of pure joy." Spencer Kaufman in Consequence described the archive as "mesmerizing. It takes the viewer back in time".

Tracey Thorn, in The New Statesmen, noted the female inclusivity in the film, commenting how "girls would be early fans but then be subtly excluded as men took ownership of a band, becoming the experts and gatekeepers, writing the journalism and the books", recalling "as a girl, I felt shut out of rock". Through the film's depiction of "a joyous crowd of boys and girls, all dancing, all equally involved and turned on", Thorn was "won over by the visceral thrill of the band's sound" which "came blasting out of the huge IMAX cinema speakers so that we were surrounded and enveloped by it. I felt myself physically convinced by them; the music had a force that simply couldn't be denied".

ABC's Luke Goodsell praised MacMahon for "taking time to highlight the band's sonic influences — particularly the way they borrowed, and re-sculpted, the sounds of their Black heroes", with Spencer Kaufman of Consequence calling it "a treat" to see the band cite the "Black blues musicians who came before them".

Some aspects of the film divided opinion. Peter Bradshaw in The Guardian awarded the film three out five stars, but criticized it for not covering the group's 12-year career. Andrew Perry, in a five star review for Mojo, praised MacMahon's "thrilling document" for focusing "on the fun part, the story of their formative years", with Josef Woodard of the Santa Barbara Independent, who called the film film a "thorough and affectionate origin story", commenting that the "complete and labyrinthine Zeppelin story would require a doc of epic proportions".

Joshua Rothkopf of the Los Angeles Times, asserted that not having "talking heads to speak to Led Zeppelin's revolutionary hugeness" was "a mistake", calling Page, Plant and Jones "boring" and labelling John Bonham as "stubbornly uninsightful". Countering this, Vulture's Devon Ivie hailed John Bonham's interview as "the beating heart" of the film, and Peter Watts of Uncut, in a 9 out of 10 review, praised Page, Plant and Jones' "rich and detailed interviews" as demonstrating "MacMahon's confidence in his core material. He doesn't need Zeppelin's contemporaries to provide context, or the rock stars of today to explain why Zeppelin mattered: the band can do it for themselves".

The New York Times Magazine's Elizabeth Nelson critiqued Becoming Led Zeppelin and the Bob Dylan biopic A Complete Unknown for not cataloguing "the countless forms of bad behavior that marked the Dylan and Zeppelin years", adding she was "jonesing for a scene of rampant chemical intake or at last a television being hurled through a hotel window". USA Today's Marco della Cava argued such "high jinks" took place two years after the film ends and "truly took wing during a debauched 1972 U.S. tour". Josef Woodard in the Santa Barbara Independent applauded the "impressive" film for avoiding "the salacious and outrageous antics in the discredited 1985 Zeppelin book Hammer of the Gods". Stephen Thomas Erlewine, for So It Goes, also commended how the film "strips away the lore and tawdry tales, instead focusing on the period when the band was in its ascendancy, figuring out how to harness their inherent power. As depicted by MacMahon, that moment still sounds vigorous and limitless".

Describing the audience response, Kenneth Corsini from Bourbon and Vinyl wrote, "the atmosphere in the theater was so charged" and that "watching Becoming Led Zeppelin is as close as you're ever going to get to seeing a rock concert in a movie theater", adding "you really grasp the power and the glory of what Led Zeppelin was when you see those live shots".

Dave Lewis, editor of Tight But Loose, the longest running Led Zeppelin fan magazine, wrote, "my statement that I didn't know I could love Led Zeppelin any more than I do – until I saw Becoming Led Zeppelin, is a sentiment shared by many." He added "We now have a film that can be used as a prime example for a new generation of fans to understand what Led Zeppelin was all about. One sitting of Becoming Led Zeppelin will surely influence so many younger budding musicians to aim high and attempt to fulfil their dreams", concluding "Becoming Led Zeppelin is ample justification for all our years of devotion".

Lina Lecaro of Los Angeles, summarized, "watching and hearing how it all came together is a true gift for fans and feels like a tonic for troubled times. Especially in IMAX theaters the film is an immersive escape, an artistic celebration that provides a break from the menacing mess of our modern times, which is what music and movies are for".

=== Music industry ===
With the release of Becoming Led Zeppelin, Led Zeppelin's streaming spiked to its highest-ever weekly peak of 40.4 million listeners, a 23% increase over the previous period, and maintained a consistent 16% increase for the rest of the year. Led Zeppelin's albums re-entered the album charts, with "Whole Lotta Love" and other songs appearing on the singles charts for the first time in decades. Notably this was accomplished with no soundtrack album and without any promotional activity or online posts from Led Zeppelin or their record label, Warner Music Group.

The film garnered acclaim from a wide spectrum of musical artists, including several who had not previously been admirers of the group's music. Tracey Thorn, singer of Everything but the Girl, wrote "I was never a Led Zeppelin fan. But for the duration of this film" was "won over by the visceral thrill of the band's sound – John Bonham's heavy groove, Page's overdriven riffing, Plant's unique voice – I felt myself physically convinced by them; the music had a force that simply couldn't be denied". Blues musician Taj Mahal said, "that film rearranged my molecules" explaining "I supported Otis Redding at the Whiskey and watched him every night and I supported Sam Cooke and watched him every night and that film is right up there with those experiences". Bob Weir, founding member of the Grateful Dead, praised the film as "game changing. It's a tremendously educational film and there's a story being told within the story that's very captivating", he praised the band's musicianship in the film as "like the John Coltrane trio with a singer". The film also received accolades via social media from the musicians Gina Birch, Ann Wilson, Tom Morello, Warren Ellis, Shirley Manson, Butch Vig and Steve Marker. Thurston Moore of Sonic Youth praised it as "a brilliant film". Chris Robinson of the Black Crowes, called it "the greatest music documentary I've ever seen".

On 17 February 2025, ten days after the film's release, Jimmy Page posted on Instagram, that he found the "incredible responses" to Becoming Led Zeppelin "humbling and inspiring".

== Accolades ==
Becoming Led Zeppelin won the 2025 Critics Choice Documentary Award for Best Music Documentary, the International Press Academy Award for Best Documentary, and the 2026 National Film Award for Best Documentary which was voted by 2.7 million members of the public. The film's screenplay was nominated for a Writers Guild of America Award. The film's sound won the Cinema Audio Society's (CSA) Award for Outstanding Achievement in Sound Mixing and was nominated for the Motion Picture Sound Editors (MPSE) Golden Reel Awards for both Outstanding Achievement in Music Editing and Outstanding Achievement in Sound Editing. The film's editing was honored by the American Cinema Editors (ACE) with a nomination for the best edited documentary feature award and the British Film Editors (BFE) with nominations for the best edited single documentary and the best edited British documentary.

Award	Category	Recipients and nominees	Result	Ref.
Critics Choice Documentary Awards	Best Music Documentary	Becoming Led Zeppelin, Bernard MacMahon, Allison McGourty	Won	
International Press Academy Awards	Best Motion Picture, Documentary	Becoming Led Zeppelin	Won	
Cinema Audio SocietyAwards	Outstanding Achievement In Sound Mixing for a Motion Picture – Documentary	Nick Bergh, Nigel Albermaniche	Won	
National Film Awards	Best Documentary	Becoming Led Zeppelin	Won	
Writers Guild of America Awards	Best Documentary Screenplay	Bernard MacMahon & Allison McGourty	Nominated	
ACE Eddie Awards	Best Edited Documentary Feature	Dan Gitlin	Nominated	
Motion Picture Sound Editors Golden Reel Awards	Outstanding Achievement in Sound Editing – Feature Documentary	Nick Bergh, Dan Gitlin, Bernard MacMahon	Nominated	
Motion Picture Sound Editors Golden Reel Awards	Outstanding Achievement in Music Editing – Documentary	Nick Bergh, Dan Gitlin, Bernard MacMahon	Nominated	
British Film Editors Cut Above Awards	Best Edited Single Documentary or Non-Fiction Programme	Dan Gitlin	Nominated	
British Film Editors Cut Above Awards	Best Edited British Documentary or Non-Fiction Programme	Dan Gitlin	Nominated	
AARP Movie Awards	Best Documentary	Becoming Led Zeppelin	Nominated	
Rolling Stone UK Awards	The Film Award	Bernard MacMahon	Nominated	
San Diego Film Critics Society Awards	Best Documentary	Becoming Led Zeppelin	Nominated	
BAFTA Film Awards	Best Documentary	Becoming Led Zeppelin	Longlist	

== Controversies ==
In May 2025, counsel for singer songwriter Jake Holmes brought a suit against Jimmy Page, Warner Chappell Music and Sony Pictures Classics for the use of the Yardbirds performance of "Dazed and Confused" in Becoming Led Zeppelin. The composition originally written by Holmes and later reworked by Page for both the Yardbirds and Led Zeppelin, was the subject of a lawsuit brought by Holmes in June 2010 for Led Zeppelin's uncredited use of his song on their debut album and other releases. Holmes was paid an undisclosed settlement in 2011 and "Dazed and Confused" was credited on all subsequent Led Zeppelin releases to "Jimmy Page inspired by Jake Holmes". The Yardbirds reworking of Holmes composition had not been part of the 2011 settlement. Holmes in his 2025 suit stated that Page had in recent years been exploiting the Yardbirds reworking of his composition, by releasing a number of sound recordings, and licensing it to the producers of Becoming Led Zeppelin. On 1 August 2025, a settlement was reached between Holmes, Page, and Warner Chappell Music, with a US Court filing made that "resolves the entire case" between the parties.

== Legacy ==
Becoming Led Zeppelin has been explicitly referenced as a model for the music documentary genre moving forward. Lisa Laman, writing for Pajiba, commented "no genre or medium of storytelling is ever dead in theaters. All it takes to revive the Western, musical, big-screen comedy, or documentary is a single hit movie. Becoming Led Zeppelin is proving that with aplomb". Wendy Mitchell of Screen International noted that a key reason the film made such an impact was its "cinema-first" strategy, which allowed for cinemas to "eventise" screenings, making it "almost like going to a gig. People would shell out to go and see the band, and they might just go and see the film the same way – wear their T-shirt and take their buddies". Becoming Led Zeppelin's success resulted in a wave of IMAX music releases and resurgence in theatrically released music documentaries. Its release strategy has since been "mirrored" by subsequent films such as Magnolia Pictures' One to One: John & Yoko, and, as Dylan Leiner of Sony Pictures Classics noted, "it became the template for the Elvis Presley documentary [EPiC: Elvis Presley in Concert]", commenting that Neon and Universal Pictures "literally used the exact same release date, same rollout, same theaters." Remarking on the success of Becoming Led Zeppelin's strategy, he added "it has rejuvenated the documentary form".

== Performances ==
Song	Performed by
"Good Times, Bad Times"	Led Zeppelin
"Train Kept A-Rollin'"	Johnny Burnette and the Rock and Roll Trio
"Jack O' Diamonds"	Lonnie Donegan
"Mama Don't Allow No Skiffle"	J.G.'s Skiffle Group
"I'm Gonna Sit Right Down and Write Myself A Letter"	Joe Baldwin & Howard
"Long Tall Sally"	Little Richard
"Sing, Sing, Sing (With A Swing)"	Benny Goodman
"Shakin' All Over"	Johnny Kidd and The Pirates
"Jerusalem"	Jonathan Scott
"Somebody Told My Girl"	Carter Lewis and The Southerners
Keep It To Yourself"	Sonny Boy Williamson
"Please, Please, Please"	James Brown and the Famous Flames
"I Got To Find My Baby"	Robert Plant and the Band Of Joy
"Song Of Mexico"	Tony Meehan
"Goldfinger"	Shirley Bassey
"Sunshine Superman"	Donovan
"To Sir With Love"	Lulu
"You Better Run"	Listen feat. Robert Plant
"Memory Lane"	Robert Plant and the Band of Joy
"Over, Under, Sideways, Down"	The Yardbirds
"Glimpses"	The Yardbirds
"Dazed and Confused"	The Yardbirds
"Better By Far"	Terry Reid
"Babe I'm Gonna Leave You"	Led Zeppelin
"Jennings Farm Blues"	Led Zeppelin
"How Many More Times"	Led Zeppelin
"Good Times, Bad Times"	Led Zeppelin
"Black Mountain Side"	Led Zeppelin
"You Shook Me"	Led Zeppelin
"Your Time Is Gonna Come"	Led Zeppelin
"Communication Breakdown"	Led Zeppelin
"Babe I'm Gonna Leave You"	Led Zeppelin
"Communication Breakdown"	Led Zeppelin
"Sugar Mama"	Led Zeppelin
"Dazed and Confused"	Led Zeppelin
"Whole Lotta Love"	Led Zeppelin
"What Is And What Should Never Be"	Led Zeppelin
"Moby Dick"	Led Zeppelin
"The Lemon Song"	Led Zeppelin
"Ramble On"	Led Zeppelin
"Bring It On Home"	Led Zeppelin
"Thank You"	Led Zeppelin
"Living Loving Maid (She's Just A Woman)"	Led Zeppelin
"Moby Dick"	Led Zeppelin
"Heartbreaker"	Led Zeppelin
"I Can't Quit You Baby"	Led Zeppelin
"I Can't Quit You Baby"	Led Zeppelin
"Whole Lotta Love"	Led Zeppelin
"Ramble On"	Led Zeppelin
"What Is And What Should Never Be"	Led Zeppelin
"C'mon Everybody"	Led Zeppelin
"Somethin' Else"	Led Zeppelin

== See also ==
- American Epic, the prequel to Becoming Led Zeppelin
- British blues
- Psychedelic music
- It Might Get Loud, a 2008 documentary featuring Jimmy Page
