= Led Zeppelin United Kingdom Tour 1968 =

1968 concert tour by Led Zeppelin

United Kingdom 1968
- Tour by Led Zeppelin
- Poster for Led Zeppelin's concert at the University of Surrey (billed as "The New Yardbirds featuring Jimmy Page"), used to help promote its 1968 U.K. tour
- Location: England
- Associated album: Led Zeppelin
- Start date: 4 October 1968
- End date: 20 December 1968
- No. of shows: 16

Led Zeppelin concert chronology
- Scandinavia 1968; United Kingdom 1968; North America 1968/1969

Led Zeppelin's 1968 tour of the United Kingdom was the first concert tour of the United Kingdom by the English rock band. It commenced on 4 October and concluded on 20 December 1968.

For some of these early shows, the band were billed as the "New Yardbirds". Press releases eventually announced that they would make their debut under the name 'Led Zeppelin' on 25 October at the University of Surrey (although posters advertising this concert erroneously continued to bill them as the 'New Yardbirds').

There was very little press reaction to this tour.

The band's second London concert (18 October, billed as 'New Yardbirds'; 9 November, billed as 'Led Zeppelin') at the Roundhouse on 9 November doubled as singer Robert Plant's wedding reception.

Jeff Beck attended the Canterbury show on 13 December. "Things went slightly wrong!" he recalled to Jimmy Page. "Your fucking amp blew up and I went, 'What's up with that, Jim?' And then I realised it was my amp, because my roadie had moonlighted and rented Jimmy my equipment! And he'd changed the impedance on the back so it sounded like a pile of shit! But I could see the potential. It was just amazing – blew the house down, blew everybody away."

== Tour set list ==
Exact set lists during this tour are sketchy, due partly to the lack of early live Led Zeppelin bootleg recordings. Old Yardbirds' live staples such as "Train Kept A-Rollin'", "Dazed and Confused", "White Summer" and possibly "For Your Love" were performed, in addition to material from the then unfinished debut album, such as "Communication Breakdown", I Can't Quit You Baby, "You Shook Me", "Babe I'm Gonna Leave You", and "How Many More Times". The band also likely performed a Garnet Mimms cover, "As Long as I Have You".

A likely set list for the tour was:

1. "Train Kept A-Rollin'" (Bradshaw, Kay, Mann)
2. "I Can't Quit You Baby" (Dixon)
3. "As Long as I Have You" (Mimms)
4. "Dazed and Confused" (Page)
5. "White Summer" (Page)
6. "For Your Love" (Gouldman)
7. "You Shook Me" (Dixon, Lenoir)
8. "Pat's Delight" (Bonham)
9. "Babe I'm Gonna Leave You" (Bredon, Page, Plant)
10. "How Many More Times" (Bonham, Jones, Page)
11. "Communication Breakdown" (Bonham, John Paul Jones, Page)

== Tour dates ==
Date	City	Country	Venue
4 October 1968	Newcastle upon Tyne	England	Mayfair Ballroom
17 October 1968	Wolverhampton	England	Lafayette Club
18 October 1968	London	England	Marquee Club
19 October 1968	Liverpool	England	Liverpool University
25 October 1968	Guildford	England	University of Surrey
2 November 1968	Ewell	England	Ewell Technical College
9 November 1968	London	England	Roundhouse
23 November 1968	Sheffield	England	Sheffield University
29 November 1968	Richmond	England	Crawdaddy Club
10 December 1968	London	England	Marquee Club
13 December 1968	Canterbury	England	Bridge Place Country Club
14 December 1968	Leeds	England	University of Leeds
15 December 1968	Hampstead	England	Bridge Place Country Club
16 December 1968	Bath	England	Bath Pavilion
19 December 1968	Exeter	England	Civic Hall
20 December 1968	London	England	Wood Green Fishmongers Hall

== Sources ==
- Lewis, Dave and Pallett, Simon (1997) Led Zeppelin: The Concert File, London: Omnibus Press. ISBN 0-7119-5307-4.
