= Led Zeppelin European Tour 1970 =

1970 concert tour by Led Zeppelin

Europe 1970
- Tour by Led Zeppelin
- Poster for Led Zeppelin's concert at Stockholm, Sweden, used to help promote its 1970 European tour
- Location: Europe
- Associated album: Led Zeppelin II
- Start date: 23 February 1970
- End date: 12 March 1970
- No. of shows: 16

Led Zeppelin concert chronology
- U.K. Spring 1970; Europe 1970; North America Spring 1970

Led Zeppelin's 1970 European Tour was a concert tour of Europe by the English rock band. The tour commenced on 23 February and concluded on 12 March 1970.

== Overview ==
During this tour, the cover for the band's debut album met with controversy. At a 28 February 1970 performance in Copenhagen, the band was billed as "The Nobs" as the result of a threat of legal action from aristocrat Frau Eva von Zeppelin, descendant of Count Ferdinand von Zeppelin creator of the Zeppelin aircraft, over use of the 'Zeppelin' name. Led Zeppelin guitarist Jimmy Page commented to the music newspaper Melody Maker that Frau Eva von Zeppelin initially took issue during an early Led Zeppelin concert performance in Copenhagen in October 1969, when she tried (unsuccessfully) to stop a television appearance. The aristocrat angrily described the group as "shrieking monkeys".

As a gesture of good will, the band invited her to meet with them at a television studio. The meeting was apparently a cordial one. However, upon leaving the studio, her anger reignited when she saw the cover of the group's first album – the exploding Hindenburg aircraft. As Page recalled:

When she saw the cover she just exploded! I had to run and hide. She just blew her top.

Frau von Zeppelin felt the band's use of Zeppelin was insulting and dishonoured her family name. As a result, hostility toward the rock group continued on their next tour of the country in early 1970 by threat of a lawsuit, unless they agreed to change their name while working there. While Peter Grant (the band's manager) was not normally passive when faced with a confrontation, it was decided to appease the aristocrat by temporarily changing the group's name.

One name speculated in the national press was "Ned Zeppelin", which Jimmy Page found humorous. After some discussion, Grant and Page settled on the tongue-in-cheek name The Nobs, a playful pun on the name of their European promoter, Claude Nobs.

The controversy in Copenhagen was considered advantageous to Led Zeppelin early in their career, as the incident gained them worldwide publicity. The band's choice of names was widely seen as an expression of the band's likability and wit.

One concert from this tour, at Frankfurt on 10 March, was cancelled at a week's notice as a result of riots having previously occurred at the venue following a concert by Jethro Tull. It was replaced by a gig at Hamburg.

== Tour set list ==
The fairly typical set list for the tour was:

1. "We're Gonna Groove" (Ben E. King)
2. "I Can't Quit You Baby" (Dixon)
3. "Dazed and Confused" (Page)
4. "Heartbreaker" (Bonham, Page, Plant)
5. "White Summer"/"Black Mountain Side" (Page)
6. "Since I've Been Loving You" (Page, Plant, Jones)
7. "Thank You" (Page, Plant)
8. "What Is and What Should Never Be" (Page, Plant) (On 7 March, 10 March, and 11 March)
9. "Moby Dick" (Bonham)
10. "How Many More Times" (Bonham, Jones, Page)

Encores (variations of the following list):

- "Communication Breakdown" (Bonham, Jones, Page)
- "Whole Lotta Love" (Bonham, Dixon, Jones, Page, Plant)
- "Bring It On Home" (Dixon, Page, Plant) (On 28 February)
- "C'mon Everybody"/"Something Else" (Cochran, Capehart, Sheeley, Cochran) (On 28 February)
- "Long Tall Sally" (Little Richard) (On 28 February)

There were some set list substitutions, variations, and order switches during the tour.

== Tour dates ==
Date	City	Country	Venue
23 February 1970	Helsinki	Finland	Kulttuuritalo
25 February 1970	Gothenburg	Sweden	Konserthuset
26 February 1970	Stockholm	Sweden	Konserthuset
27 February 1970	Amsterdam	Netherlands	Concertgebouw
28 February 1970	Copenhagen	Denmark	K.B. Hallen
7 March 1970	Montreux	Switzerland	Montreux Casino
8 March 1970	Munich	West Germany	Circus Krone Building
9 March 1970	Vienna	Austria	Wiener Konzerthaus
10 March 1970	~~Frankfurt~~	West Germany	~~Musikhalle~~
10 March 1970	Hamburg	West Germany	Musikhalle
11 March 1970	Hamburg	West Germany	Musikhalle
12 March 1970	Düsseldorf	West Germany	Rheinhalle

== Sources ==
- Lewis, Dave and Pallett, Simon (1997) Led Zeppelin: The Concert File, London: Omnibus Press. ISBN 0-7119-5307-4.
