= Led Zeppelin United Kingdom Tour 1970 =

1970 concert tour by Led Zeppelin

United Kingdom 1970
- Tour by Led Zeppelin
- Tour Programme for Led Zeppelin's Usher Hall gig in Edinburgh, Scotland, in February 1970.
- Location: England; Scotland
- Associated album: Led Zeppelin II
- Start date: 7 January 1970
- End date: 17 February 1970
- No. of shows: 8

Led Zeppelin concert chronology
- North America Autumn 1969; United Kingdom 1970; Europe 1970

Led Zeppelin's 1970 United Kingdom Tour was a concert tour of the United Kingdom by that English rock band. The tour commenced on 7 January and concluded on 17 February 1970.

This tour is arguably best known for the band's performance at the Royal Albert Hall on 9 January. According to Led Zeppelin guitarist Jimmy Page, the Royal Albert Hall was "at the time the largest and most prestigious gig in London". In 1970, Led Zeppelin commissioned the British director and producer of the BBC's In Concert at the time, Stanley Dorfman, to film Led Zeppelin Live At The Royal Albert Hall, during which Dorfman and the two camera operators he hired, Peter Whitehead and an assistant, used handheld Bolex cameras to capture the concert on 16mm film. Virtually all the footage from the Royal Albert Hall concert was featured as Disk One of Led Zeppelin DVD in 2003. The audio portions were digitally remixed for stereo and 5.1 surround mixes. Audio recordings of two songs from the concert, "We're Gonna Groove" and "I Can't Quit You Baby", had earlier been released on the 1982 album Coda. In 2022, Led Zeppelin released portions of 1970 Royal Albert Hall footage as three official music videos, Dazed and Confused (Live at The Royal Albert Hall 1970), How Many More Times (Live at The Royal Albert Hall 1970), and What Is and What Should Never Be (Live at The Royal Albert Hall 1970).

One concert from this tour, at Edinburgh on 7 February, was postponed for 10 days owing to vocalist Robert Plant suffering a minor car accident, in which he sustained some facial injuries.

For all but one of these concerts, the band did not use any supporting act, although Barclay James Harvest did support them at the Edinburgh Usher Hall gig on 17 February. This would be a trend to continue on subsequent Led Zeppelin concert tours.

== Tour set list ==
The fairly typical set list for the tour was:

1. "We're Gonna Groove" (King, Bethea)
2. "I Can't Quit You Baby" (Dixon)
3. "Dazed and Confused" (Page)
4. "Heartbreaker" (Bonham, Jones, Page, Plant)
5. "White Summer"/"Black Mountain Side" (Page)
6. "Since I've Been Loving You" (Page, Plant, Jones)
7. "Thank You" (Page, Plant)
8. "What Is and What Should Never Be" (Page, Plant) (9 January only)
9. "Moby Dick" (Bonham)
10. "How Many More Times" (Bonham, Jones, Page)

Encores (variations of the following list):

- "Communication Breakdown" (Bonham, Jones, Page)
- "Whole Lotta Love" (Bonham, Dixon, Jones, Page, Plant)
- "Bring It On Home" (Dixon, Page, Plant) (On 7 January, 9 January, and 17 February)
- "Long Tall Sally" (Little Richard) (On 9 January)
- "C'mon Everybody"/"Something Else" (Cochran, Capehart, Sheeley, Cochran) (On 7 January and 9 January)

There were some set list substitutions, variations, and order switches during the tour.

== Tour dates ==
Date	City	Country	Venue
7 January 1970	Birmingham	England	Birmingham Town Hall
8 January 1970	Bristol	England	Colston Hall
9 January 1970	London	England	Royal Albert Hall
13 January 1970	Portsmouth	England	Portsmouth Guildhall
15 January 1970	Newcastle upon Tyne	England	Newcastle City Hall
16 January 1970	Sheffield	England	Sheffield City Hall
24 January 1970	Leeds	England	University of Leeds Refectory
17 February 1970	Edinburgh	Scotland	Usher Hall rescheduled date; originally scheduled for February 7

== Sources ==
- Lewis, Dave and Pallett, Simon (1997) Led Zeppelin: The Concert File, London: Omnibus Press. ISBN 0-7119-5307-4.
