= Viram Jasani =

Musician

- Born: Viram Jasani; 1945 (age 80–81); Nairobi, Kenya
- Genres: Indian classical music
- Occupations: Musician, composer
- Instruments: Tabla, sitar
- Years active: 1963–present
- Labels: Limelight Records, Saydisc

Viram Jasani (born 1945) is a Kenyan-born Indian sitar and tabla composer and musician. He is best known for playing tabla drums on the song "Black Mountain Side" from Led Zeppelin's 1969 debut album. He was awarded an honorary degree from the University of York in March 2007.

== Discography ==
- 1972: Ragas: Streams of Light (with Mrinal Sen Gupta, Lateef Ahmed Khan and Surendra Kamat)
- 1995: Rags, Malkauns and Megh (with Gurdev Singh and Ustad Latif Ahmed Khan)

== Notable sessions ==
- 1968: soundtrack (Boom!) by John Barry
- 1969: "Black Mountain Side" (Led Zeppelin)
- 1971: soundtrack (The Trojan Women) by Mikis Theodorakis
- 1972: Dream Sequence by Cosmic Eye
- 1973: "Emperor Nero" (The Height Below) by John Williams
- 2008: Etudes/Radha Krishna by John Mayer [recorded 1971]
