= Joan Baez in Concert, Part 2 =

Live album by Joan Baez
- Released: November 1963
- Recorded: April–May 1963 U.S. concert tour
- Genre: Folk
- Length: 48:00
- Label: Vanguard VSD-2123
- Producer: Maynard Solomon

Joan Baez chronology
Joan Baez in Concert (1962)	Joan Baez in Concert, Part 2 (1963)	Joan Baez/5 (1964)

Joan Baez in Concert, Part 2 was a second installment of live material, recorded during Joan Baez' concert tours of early 1963. It peaked at number 7 on the Billboard Pop Albums chart.

== History ==
In Concert, Part 2 is the first Baez album to feature Bob Dylan covers: "Don't Think Twice It's Alright" and "With God on Our Side" (according to Baez, the first Dylan song she ever learned). Her recording of "We Shall Overcome" was made at Miles College in Birmingham, Alabama, on the same day of the mass arrest of Civil Rights demonstrators in May 1963.

The jacket notes contain an untitled poem by Bob Dylan with the recurring theme "An' I walked my road an' sung my song", which makes reference to Baez and the relationship between the two.

On the original vinyl Vanguard releases, the stereo and mono releases had different track lists; the track "With God on Our Side" from the stereo release is dropped; in its place on the mono release are the tracks "Railroad Bill" and "Rambler Gambler".

In 1988, Vanguard released most of the Part 2 release along with most of Part 1 in a combined CD called Joan Baez in Concert (both albums in full would not fit onto a single CD).

A Vanguard reissue in 2002 contains all of the tracks from the stereo and mono releases, as well as three previously unreleased tracks: "Death of Emmett Till," "Tomorrow is a Long Time" and "When First Unto This Country A Stranger I Came."

== Reception ==
Professional ratings
Review scores
Source	Rating
Allmusic	4/5 stars

In his Allmusic review, music critic Richie Unterberger wrote of the album "Her repertoire was evolving from purely traditional folk to encompass significant work by contemporary folksinger/songwriters... Baez's growth was not so radical as to alienate any of her folk followers, and the album still featured several traditional folk songs of the sort that had launched her career... The introduction of less-hidebound excursions, though, did much to lighten her approach and keep her from falling into too much of a maiden-of-constant-sorrow rut."

== Track listing ==
All songs are traditional except where noted.

=== Original stereo release ===
==== Side One ====
1. "Once I Had a Sweetheart" – 3:12
2. "Jack-a-Roe" – 3:06
3. "Don't Think Twice It's Alright" (Bob Dylan) – 3:11
4. "We Shall Overcome" (Guy Carawan, Lee Hamilton, Zilphia Horton, Pete Seeger) – 3:31
5. "Portland Town" (Derroll Adams) – 2:48
6. "Queen of Hearts" – 2:31
7. "Manhã de Carnaval" ("Morning of Carnival") / "Te Ador" ("I Adore You") (Luiz Bonfá, Antônio Maria / Traditional) – 4:50

==== Side Two ====
1. "Long Black Veil" (Marijohn Wilkin, Horace Eldred "Danny" Dill) – 3:05
2. "Fennario" – 4:01
3. "'Nu Bello Cardillo" ("The Beautiful Goldfinch") – 2:57
4. "With God on Our Side" (Bob Dylan) (stereo release only) – 6:14
5. "Three Fishers" (John Pyke Hullah, Charles Kingsley) – 2:45
6. "Hush Little Baby" – 1:25
7. "Battle Hymn of the Republic" (Julia Ward Howe) – 3:24

=== Original mono release ===
==== Side One ====
1. "Once I Had a Sweetheart" – 3:12
2. "Jack-a-Roe" – 3:06
3. "Don't Think Twice It's Alright" (Bob Dylan) – 3:11
4. "We Shall Overcome" (Guy Carawan, Lee Hamilton, Zilphia Horton, Pete Seeger) – 3:31
5. "Portland Town" (Derroll Adams) – 2:48
6. "Queen of Hearts" – 2:31
7. "Manhã de Carnaval" ("Morning of Carnival") / "Te Ador" ("I Adore You") (Luiz Bonfá, Antônio Maria / Traditional) – 4:50

==== Side Two ====
1. "Long Black Veil" (Marijohn Wilkin, Horace Eldred "Danny" Dill) – 3:05
2. "Railroad Bill" (mono release only) – 2:08
3. "Rambler, Gambler" (mono release only) – 2:05
4. "Fennario" – 4:01
5. "'Nu Bello Cardillo" ("The Beautiful Goldfinch") – 2:57
6. "Three Fishers" (John Pyke Hullah, Charles Kingsley) – 2:45
7. "Hush Little Baby" – 1:25
8. "Battle Hymn of the Republic" (Julia Ward Howe) – 3:24

=== Reissue bonus tracks ===
1. "The Death of Emmett Till" (A.C. Bilbrew) – 3:53
2. "Tomorrow is a Long Time" (Bob Dylan) – 3:14
3. "When First Unto This Country a Stranger I Came" – 2:46

== Personnel ==
- Joan Baez – vocals, acoustic guitar
- Reice Hamel – recording engineer

== Chart positions ==
Year	Chart	Position
1964	Billboard Pop Albums	7
