= Your Time Is Gonna Come =

Song by Led Zeppelin

from the album Led Zeppelin
- Released: 12 January 1969
- Recorded: 3 October 1968
- Studio: Olympic Sound Studios, London
- Genre: Blues rock • folk rock • hard rock
- Length: 4:41
- Label: Atlantic
- Songwriters: John Paul Jones; Jimmy Page; Robert Plant
- Producer: Jimmy Page

"Your Time Is Gonna Come" is a song by English rock band Led Zeppelin, released on their 1969 debut album Led Zeppelin. The lyrics concern an unfaithful woman whom the singer claims will pay the price for her deceitful ways.

English singer Sandie Shaw covered the song in late 1969. Her version became the earliest cover of a Led Zeppelin song.

== Composition ==
The song opens with John Paul Jones playing the Hammond M-100 organ. Guitarist Jimmy Page plays the Gibson J-200 acoustic guitar, as well as an out-of-tune Fender 800, a 10-string steel guitar, on this track. Page stated that he learned how to play the steel guitar only during the sessions for the first album. According to writer John Van der Kiste, the organ intro is "reminiscent of some early Procol Harum classics".

== Live performances ==
According to some sources, "Your Time Is Gonna Come" was played at the band's 1968 Scandinavian Tour. However, there are only two circulating performances of this song at Led Zeppelin concerts. The first is a short snippet played during the "Whole Lotta Love" medley on 24 September 1971 in Tokyo, Japan, while the other performance comes from a rendition of "No Quarter" from 28 May 1973, San Diego, California.

Jimmy Page performed "Your Time Is Gonna Come" on his tour with the Black Crowes in 1999. A version of the song performed by Page and the Black Crowes is on the album Live at the Greek.

== Reception ==
Retrospective reviews

Slash, the lead guitarist of Guns N' Roses, has said that "Your Time Is Gonna Come" is his favourite Led Zeppelin song. Record producer Rick Rubin has remarked, "It's like the drums are playing a big rock song and the guitars are playing a gentle folk song. And it's got one of the most upbeat choruses of any Zeppelin song, even though the words are so dark."

Ranking the song 54 out of 92 in a list of Led Zeppelin's best songs, Michael Gallucci of Ultimate Classic Rock said "'Your Time Is Gonna Come' may be the most musically confused song in Led Zeppelin's catalog. It's pretty good, though."

== Personnel ==
According to Jean-Michel Guesdon and Philippe Margotin:

- Robert Plant – vocals
- Jimmy Page – acoustic guitar, pedal steel guitar, backing vocals (?)
- John Paul Jones – bass, organ, backing vocals (?)
- John Bonham – drums, backing vocals (?)

== Bibliography ==
- Guesdon, Jean-Michel; Margotin, Philippe (2018). Led Zeppelin All the Songs: The Story Behind Every Track. Running Press. ISBN 978-0-316-448-67-3.
- Lewis, Dave (10 March 1994). The Complete Guide to the Music of Led Zeppelin. Omnibus Press. ISBN 0-7119-3528-9.
- Popoff, Martin (2018). Led Zeppelin: All the Albums, All the Songs, Expanded Edition. Quarto Publishing. ISBN 978-0-760-36376-8.
- Reddon, Frank (2008). Sonic Boom: The Impact of Led Zeppelin. Fort Erie: Enzepplopedia Publishing, Inc. ISBN 978-0-9784446-0-0.
- Van der Kiste, John (2018). Led Zeppelin: Song by Song. Fonthill Media Limited. ISBN 978-1-78155-726-6.
- Welch, Chris (2005). Led Zeppelin: Dazed and Confused: The Stories Behind Every Song. Thunder's Mouth Press. ISBN 1-56025-818-7.
