= Led Zeppelin Scandinavian Tour 1968 =

1968 concert tour by Led Zeppelin

Scandinavia 1968
- Tour by Led Zeppelin
- Poster for Led Zeppelin's concert at Gladsaxe (billed as "The Yardbirds"), used to help promote its 1968 Scandinavian tour
- Location: Denmark; Sweden; Norway
- Start date: 7 September 1968
- End date: 17 September 1968
- Legs: 1
- No. of shows: 10 (11 scheduled)

Led Zeppelin concert chronology
- Scandinavia 1968; United Kingdom 1968

The English rock band Led Zeppelin staged a concert tour of Scandinavia in September 1968. The shows marked the band's first concert tour, though they were billed under the name "the Yardbirds".

== Overview ==
Led Zeppelin's debut tour was an outstanding contractual commitment left over from The Yardbirds. The band's first concert at Teen Club, a school gymnasium in Gladsaxe, Denmark, was performed exactly two months to the day after The Yardbirds' final concert. The band's manager, Peter Grant, later said of this first concert: "Standing by the side of the stage, it was obvious that there was special chemistry."

Guitarist Jimmy Page recalled that "the tour went fantastically for us, we left them stomping the floors after every show." According to singer Robert Plant:

We made no money on the first tour. Nothing at all. Jimmy [Page] put in every penny that he'd gotten from the Yardbirds and that wasn't much. Until Peter Grant took them over, they didn't make the money they should have made. So we made the album and took off on a tour with a road crew of one.

Plant also recalled the following:

In Scandinavia we were pretty green; it was very early days and we were tiptoeing with each other. We didn't have half the recklessness that became for me the whole joy of Led Zeppelin. It was a tentative start.

For these early shows, the band was billed as the "Yardbirds" or "New Yardbirds", despite the fact that Jimmy Page was now the only surviving link with the previous band. Page later said:

We realised we were working under false pretences, the thing had gone quickly beyond where The Yardbirds had left off. We all agreed there was no point in retaining the New Yardbirds tag so when we got back from Scandinavia we decided to change the name [of the band]. It was a fresh beginning for us all.

== Tour dates ==
List of concerts, showing date, city, country, venue and opening acts
Date	City	Country	Venue	Opening Act(s)
7 September 1968	Gladsaxe	Denmark	Gladsaxe Teen Club	Fourways, Bodies
7 September 1968	Brøndby	Denmark	Brøndby Pop-Club	The Day of Phønix, The Eyes
8 September 1968	Lolland	Denmark	Reventlowparken	Beatnicks
8 September 1968	Roskilde	Denmark	Fjordvilla	LadyBirds (es), Beauty Fools
8 September 1968	Køge	Denmark	Teaterbygningen	
12 September 1968	Stockholm	Sweden	Gröna Lund	Hep Stars, Marmalade
13 September 1968	Stockholm	Sweden	Inside	Bernt Staf, Bertil Bertilsson
14 September 1968	Knivsta	Sweden	Ängby Park	Kenneth Staags with Hayati Kafé
15 September 1968	Gothenburg	Sweden	Liseberg	
~~17 September 1968~~	~~Malmö~~	Sweden	~~Folkets Park~~	
16 September 1968	Oslo	Norway	Folkets Hus Abildsø	

== Setlist ==
The setlists of the earliest shows are sketchy, as no recordings of these shows exist.

A likely setlist for this tour consisted of:

1. "Train Kept A-Rollin'"
2. "I Can't Quit You Baby"
3. "Dazed and Confused"
4. "How Many More Times"
5. "White Summer"
6. "For Your Love"
7. "You Shook Me"
8. "Babe I'm Gonna Leave You"
9. "As Long As I Have You"
10. "Communication Breakdown"

== Sources ==
- Lewis, Dave and Pallett, Simon (1997) Led Zeppelin: The Concert File, London: Omnibus Press. ISBN 0-7119-5307-4.
