= Anne Bredon =

American folk singer (1930–2019)

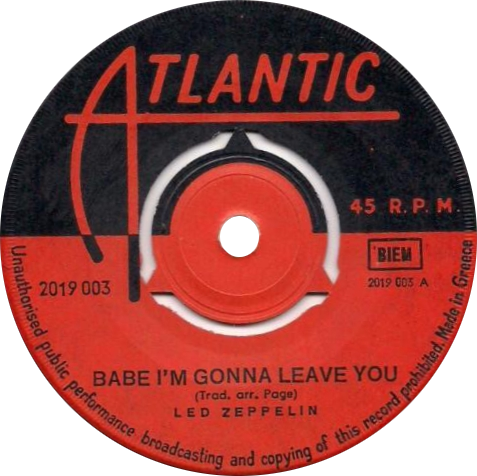
Greek vinyl of "Babe I'm Gonna Leave You", credited to "Traditional arr. Page"; Bredon would be credited with the song in 1991.

Anne Leonard Bredon (born Anne Loeb; September 7, 1930 – November 9, 2019) was an American folk singer, best known for composing the song "Babe I'm Gonna Leave You" while she was a student at University of California, Berkeley in the late 1950s. Bredon was the daughter of physicist Leonard Benedict Loeb and granddaughter of physiologist Jacques Loeb. She majored in art at Humboldt State University and completed her master's degree in mathematics at Berkeley, California.

Sometime around 1960, while attending Berkeley, Bredon appeared on a live folk-music radio show, The Midnight Special, on radio station KPFA singing "Babe I'm Gonna Leave You". Janet Smith, another folk singer, developed her own version of the song and performed it on the same radio show sometime later, catching the attention of Joan Baez who used the song on Joan Baez in Concert, Part 1 (1962). The song was initially credited as "Traditional, arr. Baez" but properly attributed on Baez's 1964 sheet music, The Joan Baez Song Book.

The English rock band Led Zeppelin covered the song after hearing Baez's version, crediting the song as "Traditional, arr. Page". In the 1980s, Bredon was made aware of Led Zeppelin's version of the song and so, since 1991, this version has been credited to Anne Bredon/Jimmy Page and Robert Plant. Bredon also received a substantial back-payment of royalties.

Bredon married Lee Johannsen in 1951. She divorced in 1959, leaving her first two children, Lenore and Joel, with her ex-husband. Later, she married Glen Bredon, a mathematics professor at UC Berkeley. In 1969, they moved to Rutgers University in New Jersey where they raised their two children, Joelle and Aaron.

She lived for many years in North Fork, California where she was active in the Sierra Mono Museum designs and sold beaded jewelry. Bredon was also a Navajo-style rug-weaver and basket-weaver, focusing on Mono Indian. She possessed an extensive knowledge of the complex aspects of harvesting and preparation of grasses and materials used in traditional California "Indian" basket weaving.

Bredon died November 9, 2019, in Clovis, California.
