= Joan Baez in Concert =

Live album by Joan Baez
- Released: September 1962
- Recorded: 1962 U.S. concert tour
- Genre: Folk
- Length: 49:08
- Label: Vanguard VSD-2122
- Producer: Maynard Solomon

Joan Baez chronology
Joan Baez, Vol. 2 (1961)	Joan Baez in Concert (1962)	Joan Baez in Concert, Part 2 (1963)

Joan Baez in Concert (later reissued as Joan Baez in Concert, Part 1) is a live album taken from Joan Baez's 1962 concert tours. It peaked at No. 10 on the Billboard Pop Albums chart.

== History ==
It was Baez's version of "Babe, I'm Gonna Leave You" that brought the song to Jimmy Page and Robert Plant's attention; the song is now more commonly associated with Page and Plant's band Led Zeppelin. Malvina Reynolds' "What Have They Done to the Rain" (about nuclear fallout) was the first "topical" song Baez ever recorded. "Até Amanhã" is a Brazilian love song and is sung entirely in Portuguese.

Vanguard released most of this album plus its subsequent companion album Joan Baez in Concert, Part 2 on CD in 1988 under this same title, Joan Baez in Concert. Length constraints required dropping some tracks; the CD reissue includes just 20 of the 28 tracks on the two vinyl releases. Dropped from the single CD release were "Babe, I'm Gonna Leave You", "Pretty Boy Floyd", "Lady Mary", "Até Amanhã", "Matty Groves", "Three Fishers", "Hush Little Baby" and "Battle Hymn of the Republic".

A 2002 Vanguard reissue includes the original Part 1 vinyl tracklist plus three previously unreleased tracks, "Streets of Laredo", "My Good Old Man" and "My Lord What A Morning."

== Reception ==
Professional ratings
Review scores
Source	Rating
Allmusic	4/5 stars
Gaslight Records	5/10 stars

In his Allmusic review, music critic Tom Semioli wrote the album's reissue "captures the undisputed queen of folk music at the onset of her fabled career. Featuring 20-bit remastering from the original analog tapes, exact replicas of the original artwork and liner notes, previously unreleased cuts, and additional liner notes, this installment of Vanguard's Original Master Series is a historic collection of contemporary and traditional folk."

== Track listing ==
All songs traditional, except where noted.

Side one
No.	Title	Writer(s)	Length
1.	"Babe I'm Gonna Leave You"	Anne Bredon	2:38
2.	"Geordie" (Child no. 209)		3:22
3.	"Copper Kettle"	Albert Frederick Beddoe	2:27
4.	"Kumbaya"		2:55
5.	"What Have They Done to the Rain"	Malvina Reynolds	2:26
6.	"Black Is the Color of My True Love's Hair"	Traditional; arranged by John Jacob Niles	2:33
7.	"Danger Waters (Hold Me Tight)"	Jacob Browne, Arthur S. Alberts	3:16

Side two
No.	Title	Writer(s)	Length
8.	"Gospel Ship (When We're Traveling Through the Air)"	Herbert Buffum	2:55
9.	"The House Carpenter" (Child no. 243)		5:08
10.	"Pretty Boy Floyd"	Woody Guthrie	4:17
11.	"Lady Mary"		2:41
12.	"Até Amanhã" ("Until Tomorrow")		2:12
13.	"Matty Groves" (Child no. 81)		7:44
Total length:			49:09

Reissue bonus tracks
No.	Title	Length
14.	"Streets of Laredo"	2:41
15.	"My Good Old Man"	3:23
16.	"My Lord, What a Morning"	4:00

CD reissue from parts 1 and 2
No.	Title	Writer(s)	Length
1.	"Once I Had a Sweetheart"		3:12
2.	"Jack-a-Roe"		3:06
3.	"Gospel Ship (When We're Traveling Through the Air)"		2:55
4.	"The House Carpenter"		5:08
5.	"Copper Kettle"		2:27
6.	"Kumbaya"		2:55
7.	"What Have They Done to the Rain"		2:26
8.	"Black Is the Color of My True Love's Hair"		2:33
9.	"Danger Waters (Hold Me Tight)"		3:16
10.	"Long Back Veil"		3:05
11.	"Fennario"		4:01
12.	"Nu Bello Cardillo" ("The Beautiful Goldfinch")		2:57
13.	"Don't Think Twice, It's All Right"	Bob Dylan	3:11
14.	"We Shall Overcome"	Guy Carawan, Lee Hamilton, Zilphia Horton, Pete Seeger	3:31
15.	"Portland Town"	Derroll Adams	2:48
16.	"Queen of Hearts"		2:31
17.	"Manhã de Carnaval" ("Morning of Carnival")	Luiz Bonfá, Antônio Maria	4:50
18.	"Te Ador" ("I Adore You")		2:24
19.	"Geordie"		3:22
20.	"With God on Our Side"	Dylan	6:14

== Personnel ==
- Joan Baez – vocals, acoustic guitar
- Reice Hamel – recording engineer

== Charts ==
Year	Chart	Position
1962	Billboard Pop Albums	10

== Certifications ==
Certifications for Joan Baez in Concert
Region	Certification	Certified units/sales
United States (RIAA)	Gold	500,000^{^}
^{^} Shipments figures based on certification alone.
