= Babe I'm Gonna Leave You =

Song written by Anne Bredon

"Babe I'm Gonna Leave You" is a folk song written by Anne Bredon in the late 1950s. Joan Baez, who learned the song from a student at Oberlin College, recorded the first published version for her 1962 album Joan Baez in Concert and a variety of musicians subsequently adapted it to a variety of styles, including the Association (1965), Quicksilver Messenger Service (1968), and Led Zeppelin (1969). Following the credit on Baez's 1962 release as "traditional, arranged by Baez", subsequent releases did not name Bredon until 1990 when, following Bredon's approach to Led Zeppelin, she received credit and royalties.

== Joan Baez rendition ==
In 1960, Anne Bredon appeared on a live folk-music show on radio station KPFA in Berkeley, California, where she performed "Babe I'm Gonna Leave You". Janet Smith heard the performance and later Joan Baez learned the song from Smith at Oberlin College.

The 1962 album Joan Baez in Concert includes a solo performance with her vocal and acoustic guitar picking. Vanguard Records co-owner/producer Maynard Solomon commented in the album liner notes: "The strange quality [and power] of the song is that the narrator inwardly desires exactly the opposite of what he [sic] will do, and is torn by the prospect of his self-imposed departure." He also describes the song as a "white blues", but does not identify the songwriter. When CD versions of Baez' album were later issued, Anne L. Bredon appears as the sole songwriter.

Due to the popularity of her album, Baez' rendition was adapted by the Plebs (with members of the Nashville Teens) (1964 single), the Association (1965 single), Mark Wynter (1965 single), Quicksilver Messenger Service (1968 Revolution soundtrack), and Led Zeppelin (1969 Led Zeppelin). The songwriters originally listed for these early versions include "trad. arr. Dennis", Anne H. Bredon, Janet Smith, Paul Bennett, Erik Darling, and "Traditional arr. by Jimmy Page".

== Led Zeppelin version ==
"Babe I'm Gonna Leave You"
- 1969 US promotional EP sleeve

Promotional single by Led Zeppelin

from the album Led Zeppelin
- B-side: "Dazed and Confused"
- Released: 12 January 1969
- Recorded: 27 September 1968, 3 October 1968
- Studio: Olympic, London
- Genre: Folk rock; hard rock
- Length: 6:40
- Label: Atlantic
- Songwriters: Anne Bredon; Jimmy Page; Robert Plant
- Producer: Jimmy Page

Audio sample
- file; help

Guitarist Jimmy Page heard Baez' version and began developing "Babe I'm Gonna Leave You" early in his career as a session guitarist. He played the song for singer Robert Plant during their first meeting at Page's riverside home at Pangbourne in late July 1968. In his book Stairway to Heaven, Zeppelin tour manager Richard Cole claims that the arrangement evolved when Plant played Page the guitar part that eventually appeared on the album; however, this has been disputed by Page. In an interview, Page commented, "I used to do the song in the days of sitting in the darkness playing my six-string behind Marianne Faithfull."

Although based on the Baez version, Led Zeppelin came up with a very different approach. They incorporate hard rock sections with electric guitar that are performed by the whole group, thus more than doubling the length of Baez' original. When the recording appeared on their 1969 debut album, the credit read "Traditional, arr. by Jimmy Page" following the unspecified (at the time) authorship of the track on Baez's album. In the 1980s, Bredon was made aware of Led Zeppelin's version of the song; since 1990, the Led Zeppelin version has been credited to Anne Bredon, Jimmy Page, and Robert Plant. Bredon received a substantial back-payment of royalties.

The band played this song at Led Zeppelin concerts on its 1969 concert tours; a filmed performance at Danmarks Radio, Gladsaxe, Denmark, on March 17, 1969, is included on the Led Zeppelin DVD (2003). For their 1994-98 project, Page and Plant performed a 9-minute version of the song, which included the opening notes of Stairway to Heaven in the outro. Plant has performed the song as a solo artist and with his bands Strange Sensation and the Sensational Space Shifters.

As of 2002, the 1969 promotional EP using the song as the A-side track and "Dazed and Confused" as B-side had been one of the top ten Led Zeppelin music collectibles, selling for around US$300–500 each.

=== Personnel ===
According to Jean-Michel Guesdon and Philippe Margotin:

- Robert Plant – vocals
- Jimmy Page – acoustic and electric guitars
- John Paul Jones – bass
- John Bonham – drums

=== Certifications ===
Certifications for "Babe I'm Gonna Leave You"
Region	Certification	Certified units/sales
New Zealand (RMNZ)	Gold	15,000^{‡}
^{‡} Sales+streaming figures based on certification alone.

== See also ==
- List of Led Zeppelin songs written or inspired by others

== Bibliography ==
- Guesdon, Jean-Michel; Margotin, Philippe (2018). Led Zeppelin All the Songs: The Story Behind Every Track. Running Press. ISBN 978-0-316-448-67-3.
