= Black Mountain Side =

Instrumental rock song performed by Led Zeppelin

Instrumental by Led Zeppelin

from the album Led Zeppelin
- Released: 12 January 1969
- Recorded: 15 October 1968
- Studio: Olympic, London
- Genre: English folk; raga rock
- Length: 2:06
- Label: Atlantic
- Composer: Jimmy Page
- Producer: Jimmy Page

"Black Mountain Side" is an instrumental by the English rock band Led Zeppelin, adapted, without credit, from Bert Jansch's original arrangement of the traditional Irish folk song "Down by Blackwaterside". It was recorded in October 1968 at Olympic Studios in London, and is included on the group's 1969 debut album Led Zeppelin.

== Composition and recording ==
"Black Mountain Side" was inspired by a traditional Irish folk song called "Down by Blackwaterside". The guitar arrangement closely follows Bert Jansch's version of that song, recorded for his 1966 album Jack Orion. Al Stewart, who followed Jansch's gigs, taught it to Page, who was a session musician for Stewart's debut album. Page played the instrumental on a borrowed Gibson J-200 acoustic guitar which was tuned to D–A–D–G–A–D, a tuning that he had used for "White Summer". To enhance the Indian character of the song, drummer and sitarist Viram Jasani played tabla on the track.

The overall Eastern-flavour of the structure led writer William S. Burroughs to make a suggestion to Page:

[I] did a joint interview with William Burroughs for Crawdaddy magazine in the early Seventies, and we had a lengthy discussion on the hypnotic power of rock and how it paralleled the music of Arabic cultures. This was an observation Burroughs had after hearing "Black Mountain Side", from our first album. He then encouraged me to go to Morocco and investigate the music first hand, something Robert [Plant] and I eventually did.

== Personnel ==
According to Jean-Michel Guesdon and Philippe Margotin:

- Jimmy Page – acoustic guitar
- Viram Jasani – tabla

== Performances ==
In concert, "Black Mountain Side" was often performed with "White Summer". A recording from Royal Albert Hall on 9 January 1970 is included on the Led Zeppelin DVD (2003).

== See also ==
- List of Led Zeppelin songs written or inspired by others

== Bibliography ==
- Guesdon, Jean-Michel; Margotin, Philippe (2018). Led Zeppelin All the Songs: The Story Behind Every Track. Running Press. ISBN 978-0-316-448-67-3.
