= How Many More Times =

Song by Led Zeppelin

from the album Led Zeppelin
- Released: 12 January 1969
- Recorded: 3 October 1968
- Studio: Olympic, London
- Genre: Blues rock • hard rock • heavy metal
- Length: 8:28
- Label: Atlantic
- Songwriters: John Bonham; John Paul Jones; Jimmy Page; Robert Plant
- Producer: Jimmy Page

"How Many More Times" is the ninth and final track on English rock band Led Zeppelin's 1969 debut album Led Zeppelin. The song is credited in the album liner to Jimmy Page, John Paul Jones, and John Bonham, but Robert Plant was later added to the ASCAP credits.

== Composition ==
At eight and a half minutes, "How Many More Times" is the longest song on the album. It is one of three Led Zeppelin songs on which Page used bowed guitar.

In an interview he gave to Guitar World magazine in 1993, Page stated that the song "was made up of little pieces I developed when I was with the Yardbirds, as were other numbers such as 'Dazed and Confused'. It was played live in the studio with cues and nods."

The "Rosie" and "Hunter" components of the song came spontaneously to the group on the night of the recording session. "The Hunter" was recorded by bluesman Albert King with Booker T. & the MGs and was written by Carl Wells and the members of Booker T. & the M.G.'s (Steve Cropper, Donald "Duck" Dunn, Al Jackson, and Booker T. Jones).

The title and Plant's vocals reference Howlin' Wolf's "How Many More Years" (1951), as well as another Howlin' Wolf tune, "You Gonna Wreck My Life", plus other songs by blues musicians he admired at the time of recording.

== Live performances ==
In 1970, "How Many More Times" was dropped from Led Zeppelin's typical setlist, although they continued to perform it on occasion until the early stages of their 1975 North American tour, when it was re-introduced in full as a result of Jimmy Page's injured finger, which temporarily prevented him from playing the more challenging "Dazed and Confused".

== Reception ==
In a contemporary review for Led Zeppelin on release, John Mendelsohn of Rolling Stone called "How Many More Times" the album's "most representative cut". Mendelsohn complimented Page's guitar solo and Bonham's drumming but criticized Plant's vocals, calling them "strained and unconvincing".

== Personnel ==
According to Jean-Michel Guesdon and Philippe Margotin:

- Robert Plant – vocals
- Jimmy Page – guitars, bow
- John Paul Jones – bass, organ
- John Bonham – drums

== See also ==
- List of cover versions of Led Zeppelin songs
- List of Led Zeppelin songs written or inspired by others

== Bibliography ==
- Guesdon, Jean-Michel; Margotin, Philippe (2018). Led Zeppelin All the Songs: The Story Behind Every Track. Running Press. ISBN 978-0-316-448-67-3.
