= Ruins (Dread Zeppelin album) =

Compilation album by Dread Zeppelin
- Released: 1996
- Label: Birdcage
- Producer: Jah Paul Jo (Joe Ramsey), Rasta Li-Mon (Lee Manning)

Dread Zeppelin chronology
Front Yard Bar*B*Que (1996)	Ruins (1996)	The Song Remains Insane (1998)

Ruins is a Dread Zeppelin album featuring B-sides, alternate mixes and previously unreleased tracks. It was originally released exclusively to members of the Dread Zeppelin fan club in 1996, before being made available to the general public later that year.

== Track listing ==
1. "Jailhouse Rock"
2. "Hey Hey What Can I Do"
3. "Woodstock" (live)
4. "Communication Breakdown"
5. "Rock & Roll"
6. "Stir It Up" (single version)
7. "Tour-Telvis: A Bad Trip"
8. "Stairway to Heaven" (single version)
9. "Jungle Boogie" — featuring Screamin' Jay Hawkins as "Dr. Paradox"
10. "Brick House Of The Holy" (Disco version) — mashup of Brick House and Houses of the Holy
11. "Takin' Care of Business" — featuring Randy Bachman
12. "Disco Inferno"
13. "Do The Claw (Again!)"
14. "The Last Resort" (soundtrack version) — from National Lampoon's Last Resort
15. "Earshot!" (The Reggae Blades)

== Personnel ==
The album features songs recorded both with and without lead singer Tortelvis. Tortelvis performs on tracks 1–3, 5–8, and 14 (and is sampled on track 15). Bassist Gary Putman (a.k.a. Butt-Boy and Gary B.I.B.B.) sings lead on tracks 9–13, guitarist Jah Paul Jo sings lead on "Communication Breakdown", and "Earshot!" is an instrumental performed by The Reggae Blades, a band whose members later formed Dread Zeppelin.
