= Altered State =

Altered State may refer to:

- Altered state of consciousness

== Music ==
- Altered State (band)
  - Altered State (Altered State album)
- Altered State (Tesseract album)
- Altered State (Yellowjackets album)
- Altered State (Stu Dent album)
- "Altered State", the 12th movement of Mike Oldfield's Tubular Bells II
- Altered States of America, a mini CD by Agoraphobic Nosebleed

== Other uses ==
- Altered States, a novel by Paddy Chayefsky
- Altered States, a 1980 film based on the novel

== See also ==
- Altered level of consciousness
