= Rock'n Roll (Dread Zeppelin album) =

Rock'N Roll

EP by Dread Zeppelin
- Released: 1991
- Genre: Hard rock, reggae rock
- Length: 31:27
- Label: Birdcage Productions (VMI inc. in Japan)
- Producer: Jah Paul Jo; Rasta Li-Mon

Dread Zeppelin chronology
| 5,000,000* *Tortelvis Fans Can't Be Wrong (1991) | Rock'N Roll (1991) | Live on Blueberry Cheesecake (1992) |

Rock’n Roll is a limited edition Dread Zeppelin album from 1991 available only in Japan (or import). The album contains both studio recordings and live performances. The short running time of the album suggests that it was at or the a promotional tool for the band in Japan.

The leaflet contains lyrics for all songs (in English), a picture of the seven band members in what looks like a Japanese city street, followed by two pages of Japanese text and finally the track listing in Japanese and English.

== Track listing ==
1. "Rock'N Roll" (Bonham, Page, Plant, Jones) – 4:40
2. "Communication Breakdown" (Page, Jones, Bonham) – 2:38
3. "Stir It Up" (Edit) (Bob Marley) – 3:52
4. "Immigrant Song" (Live) (Page, Plant) – 8:21
5. "Stairway To Heaven" (Live) (J.Page, R. Plant) – 11:56

== The Players ==
- Jah Paul Jo - Guitar, Keyboard and Vocals
- Tortelvis – Lead singer
- Ed Zeppelin – percussion, vocals and keys.
- Carl Jah – Guitars, vocals
- Butt Mon - Bass guitar
- Charlie Haj - is the man that hands Tortelvis his water and towel on stage.

== Production ==
The leaflet is sparse, without some basic information such as band members or production credits.

According to the track listing, tracks 1—3 were recorded at the Chapel, Encino, California, in February/May 1991. Lead vocals on track 3 were by Jah Paul Jo and background vocals by The Peace And Love Army. Tracks 4 and 5 were recorded live from the long lost New Year's Eve 1956 tapes, in Las Vegas, Nevada. All tracks were produced by Jah Paul Jo and Rasta Li-Mon for Birdcage Productions. The album was manufactured and distributed by Victor Musical Industries in Tokyo.
