= Un-Led-Ed =

Studio album by Dread Zeppelin
- Released: July 24, 1990
- Length: 43:24
- Label: I.R.S.
- Producers: Jah Paul Jo, Rasta Li-Mon

Dread Zeppelin chronology
Un-Led-Ed (1990)	5,000,000 (1991)

Un-Led-Ed is the debut album by Dread Zeppelin, released in 1990. The album received a public endorsement by Led Zeppelin vocalist Robert Plant, who claimed he preferred Dread Zeppelin's cover of "Your Time Is Gonna Come" to the Led Zeppelin original.

== Recording ==
Initial recording sessions for the album took place at The Chapel in Encino, California, in 1989. Co-producer Rasta Li-Mon (R. Lee Manning) was the house engineer for owner Dave Stewart, of Eurythmics. The first sessions yielded two vinyl 45 singles, "Immigrant Song" b/w "Hey Hey What Can I Do" and "Whole Lotta Love" b/w "Tour-Telvis: A Bad Trip". Both singles were released by Birdcage Records in 1989.

After selling out multiple runs of the singles in various vinyl colors, Birdcage gave the go-ahead to record a full album. The original concept was to lampoon each Led Zeppelin album in its original order but that was scrapped for more of a hodgepodge approach that could include Dread Zeppelin live favorites like "Black Dog" and "Heartbreaker."

Un-Led-Ed was 90% finished when Dread Zeppelin were signed to I.R.S. Records who arranged for the final recording sessions at Club 56 Studio in Burbank, California. Two songs were recorded: "Black Dog" and "(All I Want For Christmas Is) My Two Front Teeth." Both songs feature new drummer, Fresh Cheese 'n' Cheese (Paul Maselli). Original percussionist, Cheese (Curt Lichter), had left the band after the Chapel recordings.

"Hey Hey What Can I Do" and "Tour-Telvis: A Bad Trip" were not included on Un Led-Ed but appear on a Birdcage Records cassette-only compilation called Kom Gib Mir Deine Zeppelin and various I.R.S. single B-sides. "All I Want for Christmas Is My Two Front Teeth" appears on a 1990 I.R.S. Christmas sampler called Just in Time for Christmas.

A fourth extra track, "Un-Led-Ed," a psychedelic pastiche incorporating several songs from the album and meant to be somewhat of an overture, was cut from the album due to copyright considerations. The song appears as "Un-Led-Eddd (in 3D)" on Dread Zeppelin's 1995 album for Birdcage Records, No Quarter Pounder.

The album features a guest appearance by former Lemony Sykes vocalist George-John Chocolatto.

== Album cover ==
Birdcage Records art director, Bryant Fernandez, and producer, Jah Paul Jo, envisioned the album to incorporate a gameboard. A mock Monopoly board was created using Led Zeppelin, reggae music and Elvis Presley references for the properties and utilities. This concept was eventually used for the inside of the album. When the band signed to I.R.S., the idea was pitched to do a cover along the lines of the children's toy where magnetic shavings are manipulated by a magnet to make different hair styles. Artist Hugh Brown created a mock-up for this cover, but the idea was rejected as being too costly. Brown then created the cover that is now used, pictures of the band surrounded by branches and colored lights.

== Controversy ==
At the behest of the Elvis Presley estate, the photo of Tortelvis (Greg Tortell) on the cover of Un Led-Ed was blacked out. Later editions of the album have Tortelvis' giant Elvis coif replaced by a multi-colored rasta wig. The photos of Tortelvis on the Monopoly-style gameboard were also blacked out.

The first pressings of Un Led-Ed were distributed by MCA Records in the United States. These copies show Tortelvis with original hair and photo on the gameboard. Within a month, I.R.S. changed distributors to EMI who distributed copies of the edited cover.

The original Ed Zeppelin was played by Bryant Fernandez. His photo is on the gameboard in the inside of the CD. When Bryant left the group after DZ's first North American tour, his twin brother, Bruce Fernandez, took over the Ed Zeppelin role. His photo is on the front cover.

== Critical reception ==
Professional ratings
Review scores
Source	Rating
AllMusic	4/5 stars
Select	1/5 medals

The Chicago Tribune stated that the album "works partly because the idea is so weird and partly because the band members (Ed Zeppelin, Jah Paul Jo, Carljah, Put-Mon and Fresh Cheese) are actually rather impressive musicians."

== Track listing ==
1. "Black Dog" (John Paul Jones, Jimmy Page, Robert Plant)/"Hound Dog" (Leiber, Stoller) – 5:21
2. "Heartbreaker (At the End of Lonely Street)" (John Bonham, Jones, Page, Plant)/Heartbreak Hotel (Axton, Dursden, Presley) – 4:46
3. "Living Loving Maid (She's Just a Woman)" (Page, Plant) – 3:45
4. "Your Time Is Gonna Come" (Jones, Page) – 5:09
5. "Bring It On Home" (Page, Plant) – 4:34
6. "Whole Lotta Love" (Bonham, Willie Dixon, Jones, Page, Plant) – 4:34
7. "Black Mountain Side" (Page) – 2:01
8. "I Can't Quit You Baby" (Willie Dixon) – 6:02
9. "Immigrant Song" (Page, Plant) – 2:53
10. "Moby Dick" (Bonham, Jones, Page) – 4:19

== Personnel ==
- Carl Jah - Guitars, Maharishi and Background Vocals
- Jah Paul Jo - Guitars, Keyboard and Background Vocals
- Put-Mon - Bass and Background Vocals
- Tortelvis - Lead Vocals, Drums (on "Moby Dick")
- Ed Zeppelin - Conga, Percussion & Toast
- Cheese - Drums and Percussion
- Fresh Cheese 'n' Cheese - Drums on "Black Dog"
- I-Lar-E Treadwell - Telephone Harmonic Convergence On "Black Dog"
- "Colonel" Ron Kane - Spoken Introduction to "Moby Dick"
- Bun-E Slopes - Blues Harp on "Bring It On Home"
- The Memphis Hornies (Saxwell, Raji And Spam Acid) - Horn Section on "Black Dog"
- The Dreadettes - Background Vocals
- Michael Jordanaires - Background Vocals

Production

- Producers: Jah Paul Jo, Rasta Li-Mon
- Engineer: Rasta Li-Mon
- Mastered: Plant 'n' Paige at Love Cave
- Art Direction: Bryant Fernandez (Birdcage Records), Hugh Brown (I.R.S. Records)
- Photography: Bruce Fernandez, Andy Castro, Fred Davis

== Country and format ==
- CD: 1990 JP (JVC VICP-93)
- CD: 1990 UK (IRS EIRSACD 1042)
- CD: 1990 US (IRS X2 13048)
- CS: 1990 UK (IRS EIRSAC 1042)
- CS: 1990 US (IRS X4-13048)
- CS: 1990 US (IRS IRS-82048) Selections From Un-Led-Ed (Promotion Only)
- LP: 1990 AU (IRS L30502) Pressed on clear vinyl
- LP: 1990 BZ (IRS/EMI-Odean 713136 1)
- LP: 1990 UK (IRS EIRSA 1042) Pressed on black and clear vinyl
- LP: 1990 UK (IRS EIRSAPD 1042) Picture disc
- LP: 1990 US (IRS X1-13048) Pressed on yellow vinyl

== Charts ==
Album

Year	Chart	Position
1990	Billboard 200	116
1991	Australia ARIA Charts	93
