= The Song Remains Insane =

Live album by Dread Zeppelin
- Released: 1996
- Label: Birdcage Records (TWA Records in Australia)
- Producer: Jah Paul Jo; Rasta Li-Mon

Dread Zeppelin chronology
Ruins (1996)	The Song Remains Insane (1996)	Spam Bake (1998)

The Song Remains Insane is the tenth album by Dread Zeppelin, released in 1996. It is a double live album from their tour recorded in Paris, Tokyo, Sydney, Copenhagen and Las Vegas.

The CD insert has texts from Paul Elliot (Sounds UK), Jah Paul Jo (Halvallah 1996), and a quote from Frank Zappa “Art is about making something out of nothing and selling it”.

== Track listing ==
Disc one – titled "The Song Remains Insane"

1. "Black Dog" (Page, Plant, Jones) – 7:05
2. "Whole Lotta Love" (Page, Plant, Jones, Bonham) – 5:59
3. "Heartbreaker" (Page, Plant, Jones, Bonham) – 9:03
4. "Do The Claw" (Ramsay, Putnam, Tortell, Haasis) – 2:27
5. "Song Remains The Same" (Page, Plant) – 6:02
6. "Your Time Is Gonna Come" (Page, Jones) – 7:46
7. "In Through The Ed Door" (Traditional) – 1:19
8. "Stairway to Heaven" (Page, Plant) – 10:04

Disc two – titled "The 'Live On Strawberry Cheesecake' Sessions"

1. "See See Rider" (?) – 1:27
2. "Immigrant Song" (Page, Plant) – 3:43
3. "Black Dog" (Page, Plant, Jones) – 8:00
4. "Heartbreaker" (Page, Plant, Jones) – 5:57
5. "Do The Claw" (Ramsay, Putnam, Tortell, Haasis) – 3:02
6. "Big Ol' Gold Belt" (Ramsay, Putnam, Tortell, Haasis) – 3:35
7. "Viva Las Vegas" (Pomas, Shuman) – 0:45
8. "Woodstock" (Mitchell) – 4:09
9. "Looking' For Trouble" (Dread Zeppelin) – 0:20
10. "Rock'N'Roll Medley": "Rock & Roll" (Page, Plant), "The Ocean" (Page, Plant), "D'yer Mak'er" (Page, Plant, Jones, Bonham), "In the Light" (Page, Plant, Jones), "Dazed & Confused" (Page), "Nobody's Fault" (Page, Plant), "Bring It On Home" (Page, Plant) – 11:16
11. "Plant Chat" (N/A) – 0:57
12. "A Quiet Moment With Tortelvis" (N/A) – 0:42
13. "Radio Montage" (N/A) – 4:35

== The Players ==
- Jah Paul Jo - Guitar, Keyboard and Vocals
- Tortelvis – That Beautiful singin’ voice
- Ed Zeppelin – Congas, percussion, vocals and keys.
- Carl Jah – Guitars, vocals
- Put-Mon - Bass
- Charlie Haj - is the man that hands Tortelvis his water and towel on stage.

== Production ==
- Producers: Jah Paul Jo and Rasta Li-Mon
- Engineered by: Rasta Li-Mon
- On-site Engineering supervised by Rasta Li-Mon and Darrel Bussino by: Rasta Li-Mon
- Cover Design and Artwork: Shelley Roye
- Valuable contributions: Lee Manning and Alan Grange.
