= The Fun Sessions =

Studio album by Dread Zeppelin
- Released: 1996
- Length: 50:53
- Label: Imago
- Producer: Robert Incorvia, Dread Zeppelin

Dread Zeppelin chronology
The First No-Elvis (1995)	The Fun Sessions (1996)	Front Yard Bar*B*Que (1996)

The Fun Sessions is the 8th studio album by Dread Zeppelin, and the first made with Imago Records. It is described as “Tortelvis sings the classics”, where “classics” are songs from the late-1960s and early-1970s particularly loved by the band. The album title is a wordplay on Elvis's The Sun Sessions.

This album brings the band away from Led Zeppelin covers, like they did with It's Not Unusual, which was criticized by many fans because of its disco style and Tortelvis was not singing on it. At the time of release, Dread Zeppelin had covered most of Led Zeppelin's successful songs; they have now produced more albums than the band they mostly cover.

Only two of the original band members, Tortelvis and Butt Boy, are still in the band for this album. Unlike all previous albums, this album was not produced by Jah Paul Jo. Most of the original band members do make "special guest appearance" (Carl Jah on guitar, Rasta-mon and Ed Zeppelin on vocal).

== Track listing ==
1. "Baba O'Riley" (Townshend) - 4:04
2. "Sunshine of Your Love" (Brown, Bruce, Clapton) - 5:41
3. "Born on the Bayou" (Fogerty) - 4:20
4. "Light My Fire" (The Doors) - 4:28
5. "Smoke on the Water" (Blackmore, Gillan, Glover, Paice, Lord) - 5:17
6. "Freebird" (Collins, VanZant, Dutchess) - 6:09
7. "Feel Like Making Love" (Paul Rodgers, Mick Ralphs) - 4:19
8. "BBWAGS" (Putman, Tortell, Johnson, Burke, Boerin) - 3:58
9. "Suite: Judy Blue Eyes" (Stephen Stills) - 7:06
10. "Golden Slumbers, Carry That Weight, The End" (Lennon, McCartney) - 5:31

== Band members ==
- Tortelvis: lead vocal
- Butt Boy: six-string and pedal pusher
- Fuzzy Buzzman: bass
- Spice: drums
- Fernandez: percussion and vocals
