= Re-Purpose =

Studio album by Carl Jah
- Released: 2012
- Genre: Rock
- Length: 73:19
- Producer: Carl Jah

Re-Purpose is an instrumental rock album by former Dread Zeppelin guitarist Carl Jah. It is Jah's first album as a solo artist.

== Release and reception ==
Re-Purpose was released in 2012. In 2013, Guitar Player praised the album's sense of humor and Jah's ability to tie in many disparate musical elements; also in 2013 a Toledo Free Press review described the album as "fresh and original", praising the multi-layered guitar work and catchy riffs.

== Track listing ==
All tracks are written by Carl Jah

No.	Title	Length
1.	"Event 1: Campaign • Hooked • Dinner Bell • Devil • Favor"	11:56
2.	"Event 2: Boon • C401 • Astronaut • Static • Tronica"	12:22
3.	"Event 3: Beautiful Machine • Blap • Capricorn • Destiny • Piano Jam"	12:38
4.	"Event 4: Stick It • Wiffle • The Grinch • Interview • Church • Bonanza"	11:54
5.	"Event 5: Payload • Snow • Dance Tech • Meditation • Proposition"	13:01
6.	"Event 6: Wavevoice • Rapmaster • Has Love Lost Its Way • Plastered • Rewind"	11:28
Total length:		73:19
