= It's Not Unusual (disambiguation) =

"It's Not Unusual" is a song written by Les Reed and Gordon Mills, first recorded by Tom Jones.

It's Not Unusual may also refer to:

- It's Not Unusual, US edition of Tom Jones album Along Came Jones
- It's Not Unusual (Dread Zeppelin album)
