= Heartattack and Vine =

Studio album by Tom Waits
- Released: September 9, 1980
- Recorded: June 16–July 15, 1980
- Studios: Filmways/Heider Studio B, Hollywood, California
- Genres: Jazz pop; rock
- Length: 44:31
- Label: Asylum
- Producer: Bones Howe

Tom Waits chronology
Blue Valentine (1978)	Heartattack and Vine (1980)	One from the Heart (1982)

Heartattack and Vine is the seventh studio album by Tom Waits, released on September 9, 1980, and his final album to be released on the Asylum label.

"On the Nickel" was recorded for the Ralph Waite film of the same name. It was used as the theme song for the 1985 "The Atlanta Child Murders" miniseries. "Heartattack and Vine" was later recorded by Screamin' Jay Hawkins. In 1993 this version was used without Waits' permission in a Levi's commercial, for which Waits took legal action and won a settlement. Jean-Luc Godard used "Ruby's Arms" in his 1983 film First Name: Carmen. Bruce Springsteen performed "Jersey Girl" live (and was joined onstage by Waits to sing it on August 24, 1981), including it in his retrospective Live/1975–85.

== Reception ==
Professional ratings
Review scores
Source	Rating
AllMusic	3/5 stars
Christgau's Record Guide	B
Classic Rock	7/10
Mojo	3/5 stars
Pitchfork	8.5/10
Q	4/5 stars
Rolling Stone	4/5 stars
The Rolling Stone Album Guide	3/5 stars
Uncut	5/5 stars

Though critical of the album in many respects, including Waits' vocal delivery and the "morbid pathos" of the ballads, Stephen Holden of Rolling Stone wrote that "Tom Waits finds more beauty in the gutter than most people would find in the Garden of Eden," and referred to him as a "unique and lovable minor talent."

The album was included in the book 1001 Albums You Must Hear Before You Die.

== Waits’ comments ==
Waits saw Heartattack and Vine as a transitional record, one that marked a turning point for him and pointed toward further musical experimentation. The album, he told Record Magazine in 1983, “was me trying to avoid using a knife and a fork and a spoon. It wasn’t 100 percent successful, but it’s usually the small breakthroughs that give you a tunnel to laterally make some kind of transition. The title track was a breakthrough for me, using that kind of Yardbirds fuzz guitar, having the drummer use sticks instead of brushes. Small little things like that. More or less putting on a different costume.”

== Legacy ==
"Heartattack and Vine" was later recorded by Screamin' Jay Hawkins. In 1993 this version was used without Waits' permission in a Levi's commercial, for which Waits took legal action and won a settlement.

Bruce Springsteen performed "Jersey Girl" live (and was joined onstage by Waits to sing it on August 24, 1981), including it in his retrospective Live/1975–85.

"On the Nickel" was recorded for the 1980 Ralph Waite film of the same name. It was also used as the theme song for the 1985 "The Atlanta Child Murders" miniseries.

Jean-Luc Godard used "Ruby's Arms" in his 1983 film First Name: Carmen.

Kazuo Ishiguro stated "Ruby's Arms" influenced his 1989 novel The Remains of the Day:

I thought I'd finished Remains, but then one evening heard Tom Waits singing his song "Ruby's Arms". It's a ballad about a soldier leaving his lover sleeping in the early hours to go away on a train. Nothing unusual in that. But the song is sung in the voice of a rough American hobo type utterly unaccustomed to wearing his emotions on his sleeve. And there comes a moment, when the singer declares his heart is breaking, that's almost unbearably moving because of the tension between the sentiment itself and the huge resistance that's obviously been overcome to utter it. Waits sings the line with cathartic magnificence, and you feel a lifetime of tough-guy stoicism crumbling in the face of overwhelming sadness. I heard this and reversed a decision I'd made, that Stevens would remain emotionally buttoned up right to the bitter end. I decided that at just one point – which I'd have to choose very carefully – his rigid defence would crack, and a hitherto concealed tragic romanticism would be glimpsed.

== Track listing ==
All songs written by Tom Waits.

Side one
No.	Title	Length
1.	"Heartattack and Vine"	4:50
2.	"In Shades" (Instrumental)	4:25
3.	"Saving All My Love for You"	3:41
4.	"Downtown"	4:45
5.	"Jersey Girl"	5:11

Side two
No.	Title	Length
1.	"'Til the Money Runs Out"	4:25
2.	"On the Nickel"	6:19
3.	"Mr. Siegal"	5:14
4.	"Ruby's Arms"	5:34

== Personnel ==
- Tom Waits – vocals, electric guitar, piano
- Bob Alcivar – string arrangement, orchestral arrangement, conductor
- Ronnie Barron – Hammond organ, piano
- Roland Bautista – electric guitar, twelve-string guitar
- Greg Cohen, Jim Hughart, Larry Taylor – bass guitar
- Victor Feldman – percussion, chimes, glockenspiel
- Plas Johnson – tenor saxophone, baritone saxophone
- Michael Lang – piano
- "Big John" Thomassie – drums
- Jerry Yester – orchestral arrangement, conductor

== Charts ==
Chart (1981)	Peak position
Australia (Kent Music Report)	31
United States (Billboard 200)	96
