= Dos (Altered State album) =

[dos]:

Studio album by Altered State
- Released: October 5, 1993
- Genre: Progressive rock, alternative metal
- Length: 73:00
- Label: Warner Bros.
- Producer: Ben Grosse

Altered State chronology
Altered State (1991)	:[dos]: (1993)

Singles from ":[dos]:"
- 1. "Strong As I Am" Released: 1993; 2. "Life On A Skateboard" Released: 1994; 3. "Darkness Visible" Released: 1994

:[dos]: is the second studio album released October 5, 1993 by the American progressive rock band Altered State. Prior to the release, a demo of Made of Gasoline was included on Strength In Numbers - Metal World News Sampler Vol. 2. The song "Strong As I Am" had been previously released by Gregory Markel's previous band, The Prime Movers, and was featured in the movie Manhunter.

In 2004 and 2011 Made of Gasoline was selected by fans in a game-day introduction song poll for the former Arena Football League team the Los Angeles Avengers, and the Sacramento Mountain Lions of the defunct United Football League.

Gregory Markel performed Strong As I Am, the favorite song of fallen hero Lance Cpl. Rick J. Centanni during his memorial services at Riverside National Cemetery on April 6, 2010.

== Track listing ==
1. "This Just Might Take Me Down" (Gregory Markel, Mathewson)
2. "I Wish It Would Rain" (Markel)
3. "Life on a Skateboard" (Markel)
4. "Where Is Harrison Ford?" (Edwards, Markel, Mathewson, Moreland)
5. "Angst" (Markel)
6. "Made of Gasoline" (Markel, Mathewson)
7. "Strong as I Am" (Markel, Putnam, Licther, Ramsey)
8. "If the World..." (Markel)
9. "The Waking Dream" (Edwards, Markel, Mathewson)
10. "Licking the V..."(Markel, Mathewson)
11. "Darkness Visible" (Edwards, Markel)
12. "Thinkin' 'bout Movin' to a Catatonic State" (Edwards, Markel)
13. "Machines in Space" (Hidden Track)

== Singles ==
1. "Strong as I Am"
2. "Life on a Skateboard"
3. "Darkness Visible"

== Personnel ==
- Gregory Markel – Lead Vocals, Various instruments.
- Curtis Mathewson – guitar, bass, vocals, keyboards, programming.
- Chip Moreland – drums, percussion, vocals.
- Paul Edwards – bass, guitar.

=== Additional personnel ===
- Luis Resto - keyboards

== Additional information ==
Recorded at Music Grinder, Capitol Studios, Studio 55, Los Angeles, California; Pearl Sound Studios, Canton, Michigan.
