= Hot & Spicy Beanburger =

Studio album by Dread Zeppelin
- Released: 1993
- Length: 48:58
- Label: Birdcage
- Producers: Jah Paul Jo (Joe Ramsey); Rasta Li-Mon (Lee Manning)

Dread Zeppelin chronology
It's Not Unusual (1992)	Hot & Spicy Beanburger (1993)	No Quarter Pounder (1995)

Hot and Spicy Beanburger, released in 1993, is the fourth studio album by Dread Zeppelin. This album saw the return of Tortelvis, the lead singer who had left the band and did not appear on the previous album, It's Not Unusual.

== Overview ==
On Hot and Spicy Beanburger, Dread Zeppelin returned to a focus on Led Zeppelin songs covered in a reggae style, sung by an Elvis impersonator. The album includes Led Zeppelin songs such as "Good Times Bad Times", "Going to California", and "Hot Dog", as well as two non-Led Zeppelin songs: "Unchained Melody" and "Good Rocking Tonight". The latter song was also covered by Robert Plant on his album The Honeydrippers: Volume One, under the title "Rockin' at Midnight".

The album also includes original songs by Dread Zeppelin, such as "The Ballad of Charlie Haj", about band member Charlie Haj, who hands Tortelvis his water and towels on stage. Another original composition is "Hot and Spicy Beanburger". The latter song ends with the cryptic "here under protest is beef burger" which is a reference to the Frozen Peas commercial recordings of Orson Welles.

The leaflet list songs and credits using various glyphs instead of normal letters, such as "βallad of ¢hĀrlie Häј". The typography generally ignores conventions such as the use of upper case. The inlay feature the band members in costume on a background of a hamburger bun; the band members are placed on lettuce and tomatoes as if condiments. A quote states: "Hot & spicy beanburger is a tasty tid-bit o’love… A plentiful portion O’peace… A royal repast set before the king." This 'quote' is credited to Unknown Eastern Mystic (1956).

The album was well-received by the band's fans.

== Track listing ==
1. "Good Times Bad Times" (Bonham, Page, Jones) - 3:25
2. "Going to California" (Page, Plant) - 3:47
3. "Good Rocking Tonight" (Roy Brown) - 3:29
4. "Kashmir" (Bonham, Page, Plant) - 9:57
5. "Ballad of Charlie Haj" (Ramsey, Putman, Haasis) - 3:38
6. "Unchained Melody" (North, Zaret) - 3:15
7. "Stairway to Heaven" (Page, Plant) - 7:00
8. "Hot and Spicy Beanburger" (Ramsey, Putman, Haasis, Tortell) - 1:08
9. "Hotdog" (Page, Plant) - 2:57
10. "All of My Love" (Plant, Jones) - 6:05
11. "Wot Happened? [The sloppy shuffle]" (Ramsey, Putman, Haasis) - 4:17

Dread Zeppelin changes the songs' syntax or names from the original Led Zeppelin version on purpose. Here, the titles are listed as on the album.

== Band members ==
- Tortelvis - Lead singer
- Ed Zeppelin - congas, vocals
- Jah Paul Jo - guitar
- Butt Mon - bass
- Carl Jah - Guitar
- Spice - drums
