= No Quarter Pounder =

Studio album by Dread Zeppelin
- Released: 1995
- Genre: Reggae rock
- Length: 47:10
- Label: Birdcage
- Producer: Jah Paul Jo (Joe Ramsey) Rasta Li-Mon (Lee Manning)

Dread Zeppelin chronology
Hot & Spicy Beanburger (1993)	No Quarter Pounder (1995)	The First No-Elvis (1995)

No Quarter Pounder is an album by the American band Dread Zeppelin, released in 1995. Its title is wordplay on the Led Zeppelin song "No Quarter", and the name of a McDonald's hamburger, the Quarter Pounder. The band promoted the album with a North American tour.

== Critical reception ==
Professional ratings
Review scores
Source	Rating
AllMusic	2/5 stars
Calgary Herald	1/5 stars

The Calgary Herald noted that "once around, it was fun and funny ... But after four or five albums (lost track there) it's worn as thin as [singer] Tortelvis's Jenny Craig fantasies." The Toronto Star argued that "it's still a good joke, because Tortelvis combines a great voice with a truly warped sense of humor," and considered the album to be better than The Fun Sessions.

The Houston Press wrote: "The idea of a reggae band fronted by an Elvis impersonator performing Led Zeppelin cover tunes should have been, at most, a one-hit novelty. But because Dread Zep told the joke so well, they've endured and won approving nods from even those '70s survivors who thought Zeppelin sucked almost as bad as disco." The St. Louis Post-Dispatch dismissed No Quarter Pounder as "even more lifeless than its inspirations."

== Track listing ==
1. "Un Leddd Ed (In 3d)" (Traditional) – 1:09
2. "Ramble On" (Jimmy Page, Robert Plant) – 4:01
3. "Viva Las Vegas" (Doc Pomus, Mort Schuman) - 3:35
4. "What Is and What Should Never Be" (Page, Plant) – 4:58
5. "Li'l Baby Elvis Jackson" (Jah Paul Jo & Butt-Boy) – 3:48
6. "How Many More Times" (John Bonham, Jones, Page) – 6:25
7. "No Quarter" (John Paul Jones, Page, Plant) – 4:33
8. "The Last Resort" (Dread Zeppelin), from the film National Lampoon's Last Resort – 4:19
9. "1-800-Psychic Pal" (Jah Paul Jo, Tortelvis) – 1:44
10. "American Trilogy" (Mickey Newbury) – 3:42
11. "Brick House (Of the Holy!)" (King, Lapread, McClary, Orange, Ritchie, Williams) – 5:01
12. "Li'l Baby E.J. Goes to College (The "Son" Sessions)" (Hambone Butt-Boy, Jo, Tortelvis) – 3:55

== Additional notes ==
Catalogue: Birdcage 11006
