= Ghost Beside My Bed =

Single by Altered State

from the album Altered State
- Released: February 2, 1992
- Genre: Rock, progressive rock, alternative rock
- Length: 4:58 (radio edit); 5:51 (album version)
- Label: Warner Bros. Records
- Songwriter: Gregory Markel
- Producer: Tony Berg

Altered State singles chronology
"Step into My Groove" (1991)	"Ghost Beside My Bed" (1992)	"Strong As I Am" (1993)

Ghost Beside My Bed is a song written by Gregory Markel of the American progressive rock band Altered State, and was released on their 1991 debut album, Altered State. The song was released as the second single on Feb 2, 1992. The lyrics are based on an actual event experienced by vocalist Gregory Markel.

The song was produced by Tony Berg, and went #1 on Rock Radio in 1992 in several states in the U.S. In 2000, Lana Lane covered Ghost Beside My Bed on her Ballad Collection II album in 2000 and the Ballad Collection Special Edition.

== Track listing ==
No.	Title	Length
1.	"Ghost Beside My Bed" (radio edit)	4:58
2.	"Ghost Beside My Bed" (album version)	5:51

== Personnel ==
- Gregory Markel – lead vocals, guitars
- Chip Moreland – drums and vocals
- Curtis Mathewson – lead guitar, bass guitar, keyboards and vocals
