= 5,000,000 =

Studio album by Dread Zeppelin
- Released: May 7, 1991
- Genre: Reggae Rock
- Length: 50:51
- Label: I.R.S.
- Producer: Jah Paul Jo, Rasta Li-Mon

Dread Zeppelin chronology
Un-Led-Ed (1990)	5,000,000 (1991)	It's Not Unusual (1992)

Professional ratings
Review scores
Source	Rating
Allmusic	link

5,000,000 (*Tortelvis Fans Can't Be Wrong) is Dread Zeppelin's second full-length album. Recorded in early fall 1990, it was conceived and recorded during a three-week break from touring to support the surprisingly successful Un-Led-Ed. Produced by Jah Paul Jo and Rasta Li-Mon, the album once again featured their patented "Zeppelin-Inna-Reggae-Style" hybrid plus 3 original songs and a cover of Bob Marley's "Stir It Up" and "Train Kept A-Rollin'" by The Yardbirds. The album was released worldwide by I.R.S. Records in 1991.

The title is a reference to the Elvis Presley album 50,000,000 Elvis Fans Can't Be Wrong. The cover image is an homage to the Led Zeppelin album Led Zeppelin IV.

== "Stairway to Heaven" and "Stir It Up" ==
Producer/guitarist Jah Paul Jo had said that they left "Stairway to Heaven" off of Un Led-Ed on purpose so people would have to buy the second album, too.

"Stairway to Heaven" was edited to be released as a single in the UK (vinyl and CD format). It was also offered as a 3" CD in Japan. Dread Zeppelin's version of Elvis Presley's "Jailhouse Rock" is the B-side of the UK single.

A video to promote "Stairway to Heaven" was proposed but never finished due to copyright considerations. The concept was a take-off on the Japanese film King Kong vs. Godzilla, with a gargantuan Tortelvis fighting Godzilla. Many of Dread Zeppelin's 1991 Japanese performances were filmed for inclusion in the video, but it was never completed.

"Stir It Up" by Bob Marley also got the Dread Zeppelin treatment. "Stir it up, Charlie... put it in a blender and get real gone," vocalist Tortelvis is heard to mutter on the fade. The song also features electric sitar and a Moog Synthesizer the band claimed to find in Dave Stewart's (Eurythmics) attic.

A video of "Stir It Up" was released in 1991 to promote the album. In it, various members of Dread Zeppelin appear as themselves and also as a backup singing group (The Michael Jordanaires) and Tortelvis as Bingo Master in Lederhosen at an Elk's Lodge.

== Album cover ==
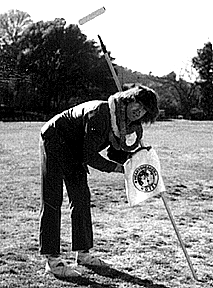
Outtake from 5,000,000 album cover photo session

Instead of the mystic man holding sticks on the cover of Led Zeppelin IV, 5,000,000 has Tortelvis' towel and water man, Charlie Haj holding various pool cues and cleaning gear. The inside of the album is a telethon with people manning the telephones and the band posing beside a large-size mock up of a check. The credits for the album are pictured as a tear-stained thank-you speech presumably never given.

In the US, the cover is in color on the outside but black and white on the inside. UK and Japanese versions are full color inside and out.

In the UK, the album was released on vinyl and CD.

== Track listing ==
No.	Title	Writer(s)	Length
1.	"Forgetting About Business, Pt. 1"	Haasis, Putman, Ramsey, Tortell	1:13
2.	"The Song Remains the Same"	Jimmy Page, Robert Plant	5:28
3.	"Stir It Up"	Bob Marley	5:59
4.	"Do the Claw"	Haasis, Putman, Ramsey	2:14
5.	"When the Levee Breaks"	John Bonham, John Paul Jones, Memphis Minnie, Page, Plant	5:25
6.	"Misty Mountain Hop"	Jones, Page, Plant	3:51
7.	"Train Kept A-Rollin'"	Tiny Bradshaw, Howie Kay, Lois Mann	6:16
8.	"Nobody's Fault (Butt Mon)"	Page, Plant	4:25
9.	"Big Ol' Gol Belt"	Haasis, Putman, Ramsey	3:53
10.	"Forgetting About Business, Pt. 2"	Haasis, Putman, Ramsey, Tortell	3:51
11.	"Stairway to Heaven"	Page, Plant	8:16

== Personnel ==
- Carl Jah – Guitars and Background Vocals
- Jah Paul Jo – Guitars, Keyboard and Background Vocals
- Put-Mon – Porn Bass and Background Vocals
- Tortelvis – Lead Vocals
- Ed Zeppelin – Conga, Percussion & Toast
- Fresh Cheese 'n' Cheese – Drums
- I-Lar-E Treadwell – Larry's Tower and Vocal Introduction On "Forgettin' About Business," Balalaika on "When the Levee Breaks"
- Bun-E Slopes – Blues Harp on "When the Levee Breaks" and "Train Kept A-Rollin'"
- The Dreadettes – Background Vocals
- Michael Jordanaires – Background Vocals

== Production ==
- Producers: Jah Paul Jo, Rasta Li-Mon
- Engineer: Rasta Li-Mon
- Art direction: Hugh Brown
- Photography: Hugh Brown
- Charlie Haj is the man who hands Tortelvis his water and towels on stage.

== Release formats ==
- CD: 1991 UK (IRS EIRSACD 1057)
- CD: 1991 US (IRS X2-13092)
- CD: 1991 JP (JVC VICP-5053)
- CS: 1991 UK (IRS EIRSAC 1057)
- CS: 1991 US (IRS X4-13092)
- LP: 1991 UK (IRS EIRSA 1057)
