= One from the Heart (album) =

Soundtrack album by Tom Waits and Crystal Gayle
- Released: October 1982
- Recorded: October 1980–September 1981
- Studio: Wally Heider's Studio 3 (Hollywood)
- Genre: Jazz; film soundtrack
- Length: 41:45
- Label: CBS
- Producer: Bones Howe

Crystal Gayle chronology
| True Love (1982) | One from the Heart (1982) | Cage the Songbird (1983) |

Tom Waits chronology
| Heartattack and Vine (1980) | One from the Heart (1982) | Swordfishtrombones (1983) |

Professional ratings
Review scores
| Source | Rating |
|---|---|
| AllMusic | 4.5/5 stars |
| The Encyclopedia of Popular Music | 4/5 stars |
| Mojo | 4/5 stars |
| Rolling Stone | 4/5 stars |
| The Rolling Stone Album Guide | 4/5 stars |

One from the Heart is a soundtrack album of Tom Waits compositions for the Francis Ford Coppola film of the same name. It was recorded from October 1980 to September 1981. It was during this period that Waits met his wife Kathleen Brennan, an employee at the studio where it was recorded. While the film was released in February, the soundtrack album release was delayed until October 1982 due to a dispute between Columbia Records and Coppola's Zoetrope Studios.

Crystal Gayle sings on the record, performing either solo or in duets with Waits. The soundtrack was nominated for an Academy Award for Original Music Score at the 55th Academy Awards.

The movie was re-released on DVD on January 27, 2004, and the DVD contains remixed and remastered Dolby Digital 5.1 Surround Sound of the soundtrack from Waits' original studio sessions, a documentary on the making of the soundtrack, as well as previously unreleased demo recordings and alternate takes.

== Production ==
The album was the last in an almost decade-long collaboration between Tom Waits and producer Bones Howe. Howe recounts how Waits broke the news to him: "He called me up and said 'Can we have a drink?' He told me he realised one night that as he was writing a song, he found himself asking 'If I write this, will Bones like it?' I said to him that we were getting to be kind of like an old married couple. I said I don't want to be the reason that an artist can't create. It was time for him to find another producer. We shook hands and that was it. It was a great ride."

In the midst of scoring the film, Waits and Howe took a two-month leave of absence to record Waits' seventh studio album Heartattack and Vine.

== Critical reception ==
The Austin Chronicle wrote: "Of course Waits fans might chafe at the Crystal clarity of the country music siren's ringing cry, but like the last and best duet on the soundtrack explains, 'This One's From the Heart'."

== Legacy ==
Waits reflected that scoring One from the Heart refined his approach to songwriting and added discipline to his work ethic. “Up till then, writing songs was something I did when I’d been drinking, and I wasn't absolutely sure I was capable of doing it in terms of being a craftsman. And being part of something very large, you have to discuss openly what it is you do and how it relates to a carpenter, a designer, a lighting guy and an actor. So it made me more responsible and more disciplined.”

Francis Ford Coppola himself also helped bring some of these changes to the surface. “I remember one evening at Coppola’s house listening to a Puccini aria. It was a particularly thrilling musical experience, because I started to get a feeling for how a collection of songs has to have a shape, how the songs have to work together.”

== Track listing ==
All tracks are written by Tom Waits.

Side one
| No. | Title | Vocalist(s) | Length |
|---|---|---|---|
| 1. | "Opening Montage" a. "Tom's Piano Intro" b. "Once Upon a Town" c. "The Wages of Love" | Waits; Crystal Gayle | 5:16 |
| 2. | "Is There Any Way Out of This Dream?" | Gayle | 2:13 |
| 3. | "Picking Up After You" | Waits; Gayle | 3:54 |
| 4. | "Old Boyfriends" | Gayle | 5:53 |
| 5. | "Broken Bicycles" | Waits | 2:53 |

Side two
| No. | Title | Vocalist(s) | Length |
|---|---|---|---|
| 1. | "I Beg Your Pardon" | Waits | 4:26 |
| 2. | "Little Boy Blue" | Waits | 3:43 |
| 3. | "Instrumental Montage" a. "The Tango" b. "Circus Girl" | — | 3:00 |
| 4. | "You Can't Unring a Bell" | Waits | 2:20 |
| 5. | "This One's from the Heart" | Waits; Gayle | 5:45 |
| 6. | "Take Me Home" | Gayle | 1:37 |
| 7. | "Presents" | — | 1:00 |

Bonus tracks (2004 reissue)
| No. | Title | Vocalist(s) | Length |
|---|---|---|---|
| 13. | "Candy Apple Red" | Waits | 2:45 |
| 14. | "Once Upon a Time/Empty Pockets" | Waits | 5:21 |

== Personnel ==
- Tom Waits – vocals, piano, orchestral arrangements
- Crystal Gayle – vocals

=== Musicians ===
- Bob Alcivar – piano, orchestral arrangement, conductor
- Ronnie Barron – organ on "Little Boy Blue"
- Dennis Budimir – guitar on "Opening Montage" and "Old Boyfriends"
- Larry Bunker – drums on "The Tango"
- Gene Cipriano – tenor saxophone on "The Tango"
- Greg Cohen – bass
- Teddy Edwards – tenor saxophone
- Victor Feldman – timpani on "You Can't Unring a Bell"
- Chuck Findley – trumpet on "Circus Girl"
- Dick Hyde – trombone on "Circus Girl"
- Pete Jolly – piano, accordion, celeste
- Gayle Levant – harp
- John Lowe – woodwind on "Circus Girl"
- Shelly Manne – drums on "Opening Montage", "Is There Any Way Out of This Dream?" and "Old Boyfriends"
- Lonny Morgan – woodwind
- Joe Porcaro – glockenspiel on "Presents"
- Emil Richards – vibes on "I Beg Your Pardon"
- Jack Sheldon – trumpet
- John Thomassie – percussion on "Little Boy Blue"
- Leslie Thompson – harmonica on "Circus Girl"
- Don Waldrop – tuba on "Instrumental Montage"

=== Technical personnel ===
- Bones Howe – producer, sound, engineer, remixer
- Biff Dawes – engineer
- Tim Boyle – second engineer
- Dave Demore – second engineer
- Bob Winder – second engineer
- Richard Beggs – sound montages
- Kathy Morton – sound assistant
