= Heartattack and Vine (song) =

Song by Tom Waits

from the album Heartattack and Vine
- Released: September 1980
- Studio: Filmways/Heider Recording, Hollywood, California
- Length: 4:50
- Label: Asylum
- Songwriter(s): Tom Waits
- Producer(s): Bones Howe

"Heartattack and Vine" is a song from the Tom Waits album by the same name. The song takes its name from Hollywood and Vine in Hollywood. It refers to locations and details of Los Angeles (for example, Cahuenga is a street, and the local bus system was formerly known as the RTD).

== Lawsuit ==
The song was covered by Screamin' Jay Hawkins and featured in the Levi's commercial "Procession" directed by Michael Haussman. Waits sued in European court over this use of his music and won. The following apology from Levi's appeared in a 1993 issue of Billboard:

Tom Waits is opposed to his music, voice, name or picture being used in commercials. We at Levi Strauss & Co. have long admired Mr. Waits' work and respect his artistic integrity including his heartfelt views on the use of his music in commercials. From January to June 1993 Levi Strauss Europe authorized broadcasting in 17 countries a commercial for Levi's 501 jeans called "Procession". This commercial featured Tom Waits' song "Heart Attack and Vine" performed by Screamin' Jay Hawkins. We obtained the rights in good faith and were unaware of Mr. Waits' objections to such usage of his composition. We meant no offense to Mr. Waits and regret that "Heart Attack and Vine" was used against his wishes and that the commercial caused him embarrassment.
