= The Prime Movers (Los Angeles band) =

American rock band (1983–1989)

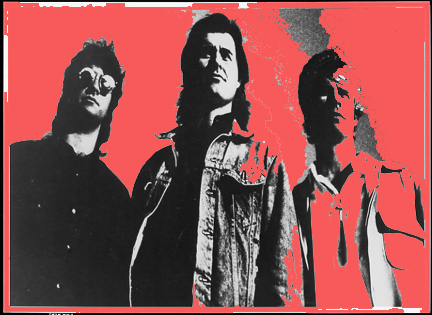
- Curt Lichter, Severs Ramsey, Gary Putman (1988)

Background information
- Origin: Sierra Madre, California, United States
- Genre: Rock
- Years active: 1983-1989
- Labels: Birdcage, Island
- Spinoffs: Dread Zeppelin
- Past members: Severs Ramsey; Gary Putman; Curt Lichter; Gary Falasco; Gregory Markel; Rob Schilling
- Website: Primemoversmusic.com

The Prime Movers were a rock band from the Sierra Madre, California area known for its post-punk ethereal sound and lyrics evocative of the New West.

With titles like "On The Trail", "Last Cafe", and "Dark Western Night," The Prime Movers found themselves in the middle of a psychedelic revival in Los Angeles in the mid-1980s along with other bands such as Dream Syndicate, The Long Ryders, Rain Parade, Thin White Rope and Green On Red. Island Records signed The Prime Movers and released a five-song EP (Prime Movers) and two singles, "On The Trail" and "Dark Western Night." A song from the EP, "Strong As I Am" was selected by film-maker Michael Mann to be the featured song in his movie, Manhunter. The song was included on the Manhunter soundtrack LP as well as being released as the A-side of a single on MCA Records. It was later used again in Damian Lee's 1991 sci-fi action film Abraxas, Guardian of the Universe.

The band broke up in 1988 and the three main members, Severs Ramsey, Gary Putman and Curt Lichter morphed into Dread Zeppelin.

== Birdcage Records ==
Created by Severs Ramsey as a vehicle to release Prime Movers' material, independent record label Birdcage Records' first release was a 7-inch vinyl 45 by The Prime Movers: "Chances" b/w "In Touch With You" in 1983. A full-length album, "Museum" followed in 1984. Produced by Wall Of Voodoo's Jim Hill, the album received glowing notices leading Cashbox Magazine to gush," “Gary Putman weaves an ethereal tapestry which blends technical wizardry with pure emotion to create one of the most stylistically unique guitar sounds ever (Did you hear that, Les Paul?).”.

The band were mainstays on the Los Angeles club circuit becoming fan favorites at the legendary Madame Wong's Chinatown, The Troubador, The Roxy, Club Lingerie and many others. The strength of their live show and the college radio support of "Museum," ultimately drew the attention of Island A&R man and former member of Fairport Convention and Matthew's Southern Comfort, Iain Matthews.

== Island ==
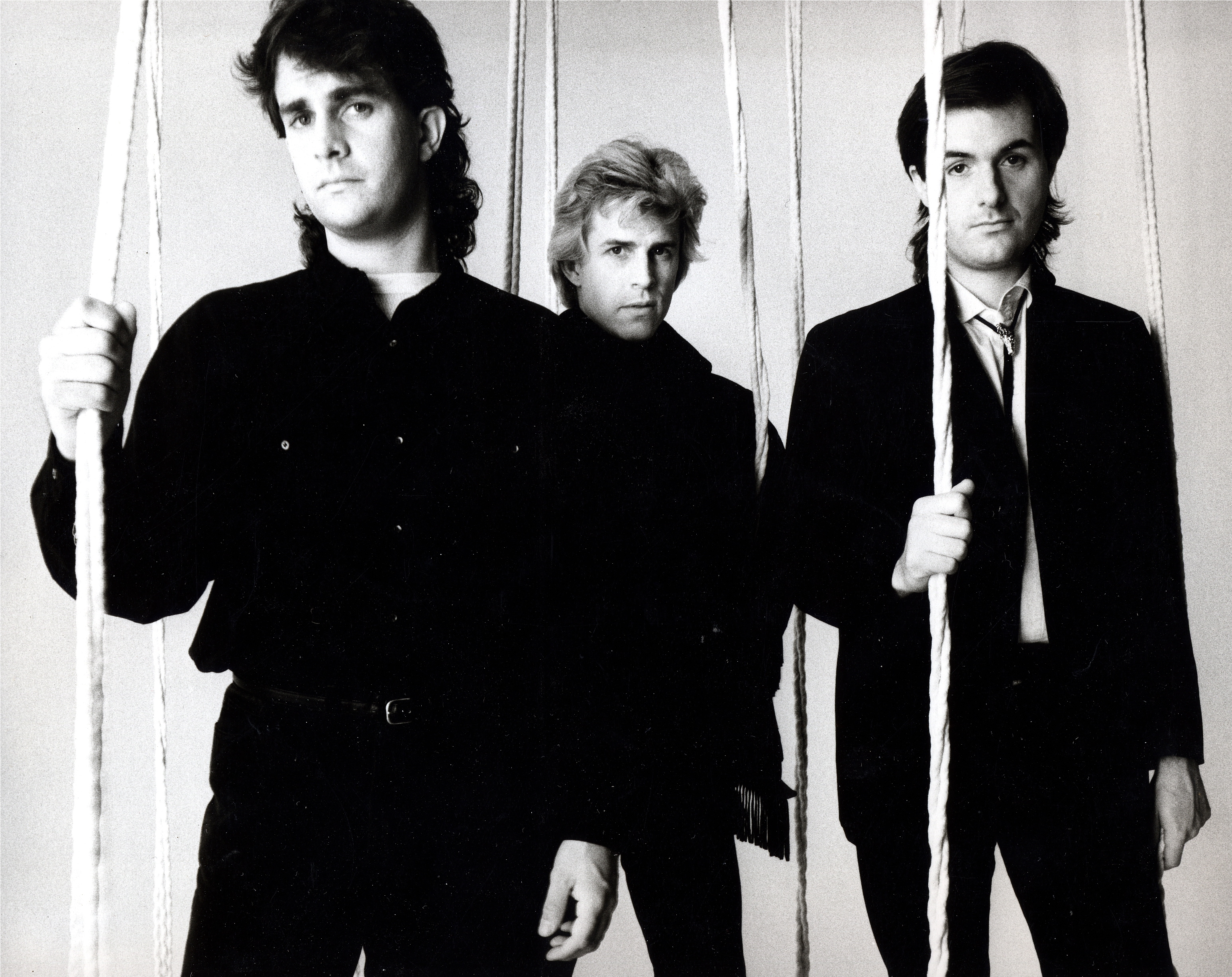

The Prime Movers signed to Island and soon began work on what was to become their eponymously named 5-song EP. The band added vocalist Gregory Markel shortly before the recording sessions began. Markel contributed a stunning voice and the idea for a new song called "Strong As I Am" that would later play a large part in The Prime Mover saga. The recording was produced by Englishman Chris Tsangarides, best known for his work with many heavy metal acts including Gary Moore, Thin Lizzy, Judas Priest and Black Sabbath. The EP was recorded at MCA Whitney Studios in Glendale, CA, and the sessions were engineered by MCA staffer, Doug Schwartz.

The EP (with songs "On The Trail", "Strong As I Am", the instrumental "Kahlua House", "She's Got Pages", and "The Outsider") was released in the US and UK in 1985 to glowing reviews. "On The Trail" was picked up by BBC Radio One who played it as if it were a number one single. Demand to see the band in the UK was such that a hastily arranged press tour was soon followed by a British tour as support act for Big Country.

Unfortunately, before the tour commenced, Markel, citing artistic differences, dropped out, leaving the band as a trio again. Undaunted, The Prime Movers returned to the studio with Tsangarides and recorded the single, "Dark Western Night" b/w "Lost In Your World." This time, the band recorded at producer Robin Millar's studio, The Power Plant, in London. With Big Country finishing up work on their album, The Seer, in the studio next door, The Prime Movers asked new friend Stuart Adamson to lay down a guitar part on "Dark Western Night." He lent his trademark E-Bow (bagpipe) guitar sound to the single.

== Big Country UK Tour ==
Sold Out!

In March 1986, The Prime Movers embarked on a 15 date UK Tour as special guests of Big Country. "The Seer" Tour was buoyed by the strength of a number seven charting single, "Look Away," and all shows were sold out including two packed nights at London's fabled Hammersmith Odeon. The tour was a huge success and The Prime Mover's "Dark Western Night" was repackaged by Island as a twelve-inch, yellow vinyl, double set with record two being live recordings from the tour.

== Manhunter ==
A regular at The Prime Movers' live shows was the film director Michael Mann. Mann picked the song "Strong As I Am" for a pivotal spot in his cult thriller film, Manhunter. "Strong As I Am" was included in the Manhunter soundtrack album and later released by MCA as a single. Mann financed the making of the "Strong As I Am" video, that was directed by Mann's longtime DOP Dante Spinotti.

== Dread Zeppelin ==
On their return to the US, the Prime Movers learned that the managing director and most of the A&R staff at Island had been fired. Demos continued to be recorded for the proposed Prime Mover album, but it soon became clear that the band no longer had a champion within the company. Island would not let the Prime Movers put out new material, nor would they release them from their recording contract. Despite offers from other majors, especially Rhino Records who were interested, The Prime Movers found themselves out of business with no label backing.

Severs Ramsey and longtime live engineer, Lee Manning, assembled many of the songwriting demos into an album that was distributed to college radio called, "Spooked." The band also secured the opening slot on Thomas Dolby's "Alien's Ate My Buick" 1988 US tour. Despite the success of the tour and a renewed interest in the band due to the new material on "Spooked," the band realized they had nowhere to go.

It was then that Ramsey hatched the bright idea to record new music under an assumed name. He, Putman and Lichter, as Jah Paul Jo, Put-Mon and Cheese respectively, recruited some old friends and entered their own, self-induced Musical Witness Protection Program: Dread Zeppelin was born.

The Prime Movers officially broke up in 1988 with the original three members devoting full-time to the Dread Zeppelin project.

== Reunion ==
In 2006, Ramsey and Putman, along with new drummer, Gary Falasco, reunited for a series of sporadic gigs as well as the CD reissue of their 1984 album, "Museum." Bonus tracks on the CD release include The Prime Movers' first single, "Chances" plus live versions of "On The Trail" and ""In Touch With You" from The Big Country tour. Also included is a live version of "That Freedom Feeling/Way Station" recorded at The Roxy in Hollywood, California in 1988.

== Discography ==
=== Studio albums ===
- Museum (1984)
- "Spooked" (1988)
- Exposure (2016)

=== Extended plays ===
- The Prime Movers (1985)
- Dark Western Night (1987)

=== Singles ===
- "Chances" / "In Touch With You" (1983)
- "On the Trail" / "Strong As I Am" (1986)
- "Dark Western Night" / "Lost In Your World" (1987)

=== Soundtrack appearances ===
- "Strong As I Am" (Manhunter) (1987)
- "Strong As I Am" (Abraxas, Guardian of the Universe) (1990)
