= It's Not Unusual (Dread Zeppelin album) =

Studio album by Dread Zeppelin
- Released: October 6, 1992
- Length: 45:20
- Label: I.R.S
- Producer: Jah Paul Jo, Rasta Li-Mon, Greg Edward

Dread Zeppelin chronology
5,000,000 (1991)	It's Not Unusual (1992)	Hot & Spicy Beanburger (1993)

It's Not Unusual is the third album by the musical group Dread Zeppelin, released by I.R.S. Records in 1992. The album presents a shift from reggae-tinged Led Zeppelin covers to disco music cover songs from the 1970s.

The album was produced by Jah Paul Jo, Rasta Li-Mon and Greg Edward.

== Recording ==
Jah Paul Jo and Rasta Li-Mon decided early on that they would like to attempt to record basic tracks for the album at their own home studio, The Mapletree Ranch. To accomplish this, they hoped to bring in an outside engineer/producer with the mobile equipment necessary. Early candidates were Ron and Russell Mael, collectively known as Sparks, who were keen to produce but had problems with scheduling.

Greg Edward was a staff engineer and producer at Virgin Studios and also had the recording gear necessary. He became a valuable member of the production team and also served as cheerleader when the going got tough due to personnel changes within the band.

Sessions for the album began in early 1992. Within weeks it became obvious that Tortelvis had personal problems and would not be able to continue. Some early recordings of songs from "It's Not Unusual" exist with Tortelvis vocals. Basic tracks continued to be recorded despite the fact that Dread Zeppelin no longer had a lead vocalist.

After an exhaustive search for a replacement, it was decided that band bassist, Put-Mon, would take on the vocal duties. Inexplicably taking on the name of Gary B.I.B.B., Put-Mon cut a more trim, youthful, pre-Army era Elvis-like figure.

"It's Not Unusual Live!"

With the departure of Tortelvis, as well as Ed Zeppelin and drummer Fresh Cheese 'n' Cheese, the production team decided a new approach was necessary. Rasta Li-Mon introduced "Velveeta," a computer-driven drum machine and samples box that included a lot of the sound effects that the live Dread Zeppelin had become famous for. Augmenting "Velveeta" was new percussionist, Spice.

Overdubs were recorded at Virgin Studios in Los Angeles with Greg Edward engineering. The band were honored to have Randy Bachman of Bachman-Turner Overdrive and The Guess Who contribute a guest vocal and guitar solo on his composition, "Takin' Care of Business."

Also adding several amazing vocal performances was the legendary Screamin' Jay Hawkins who had become a regular at Dread Zeppelin gigs in the Los Angeles area. In the true Dread Zeppelin spirit, Screamin' Jay insisted on being credited on the album as "Dr. Paradox." "Jungle Boogie" became a vocal tour-de-force for Screamin' Jay as he both sings and performs his trademark vocal effects.

The album's final mix was recorded at Scream Studio in Studio City, CA by Jah Paul Jo and Rasta Li-Mon.

== Album Cover ==
The original working title of the album was "Groovy Booty Bomb" which is where it was to be filed according to the finished cover. Photos for the album cover were by I.R.S. Art Director Hugh Brown. The band show off their new glittering Disco outfits designed exclusively by Consuela of Soto Street. Album cover and alternate longbox cover was designed by fRed Davis. On the longbox cover, each member of the band hold up their individual instruments which, by this time in their career, had become quite stylized.

== Controversy ==
This version of the band caused more of a stir than the original explosive popularity of Un Led-Ed. Their sudden change in style to disco and the absence of Tortelvis puzzled long-time listeners. Reviews were mixed, but extremely polarized - either extremely positive or negative. Despite many positive reviews of their live concerts and a North American tour, sales of the album failed to meet expectations and Dread Zeppelin were dropped by I.R.S. Records. However, soon after Dread Zeppelin left I.R.S., the label signed another act called "The King" whose act was doing covers Elvis-style, but he never came close to achieving the popularity of Dread Zeppelin.

Two songs were withheld from the final version of "It's Not Unusual." The sequel to the Dread Zeppelin original song "Do the Claw", called "Do the Claw (Again)", was withheld for copyright considerations (too much like Chubby Checker's "Let's Twist Again"). "Brickhouse of the Holy" was pulled because of reservations by co-writer of "Brick House," Lionel Richie.

== Track listing ==
1. "Disco Inferno" - 6:57
2. "You Should Be Dancing" - 3:34
3. "Night Fever" - 5:08
4. "Shaft" - 3:03
5. "Jungle Boogie" - 4:17
6. "Ramble On" - 5:30
7. "More Than a Woman" - 4:10
8. "Jive Talkin'" - 4:35
9. "Dancin' On The Killing Floor" - 3:37
10. "Takin' Care of Business" - 4:28

== Personnel ==
- Garry B.I.B.B. - Lead Vocals, Guitar, Porn Bass
- Jah Paul Jo - Cosmic Stun Guitar, Keyboard, Background Vocals
- Carl Jah - Guitar, Background Vocals
- Rasta Li-Mon - Keyboard, Samples
- Spice - Percussion
- Tuna Melt (AKA Jah Jah Gabor) - Bass, Background Vocals
- Randy Bachman - (Taking Care Of Business),
- Dr. Paradox (Screamin' Jay Hawkins) - (Jungle Boogie and Disco Inferno),
- Murray B.I.B.B. – Vocal Instructions
- The Dreadettes (Laura Creamer, Sue Sheridan, Beatrice Ring, Shannon Eldridge) - Background Vocals
- The B.I.B.B. Girls (Rachel Murray, Karen Blankfeld, Klink, Max) - Background Vocals
- Michael Jordanaires - Background Vocals

== Production ==
- Producers: Jah Paul Jo, Rasta Li-Mon, Greg Edward
- Engineer: Greg Edward, Rasta Li-Mon
- Assistant Engineer: Paula “Max” Garcia, Craig Doubet
- Art Direction: fRed Zeppelin (sic)
- Photography: Hugh Brown
- Mastering Steven Marcussen at Precision Mastering

Recorded at:

- The Putman’s Mapletree Ranch, Arcadia, California
- Virgin’s Convent Studio, Beverly Hills, California
- Scream Studio, Studio City, California
