= Norman Durkee =

- Born: October 8, 1948; Tacoma, Washington
- Died: January 17, 2014 (aged 65) Seattle, Washington
- Occupations: composer, musician
- Instrument: piano

Norman Edward Durkee was an American composer and pianist known for his eclectic mix of classical, jazz, rock and blues but best known for his boogie-woogie piano contribution to the 1974 Bachman–Turner Overdrive hit "Takin' Care of Business".

Described as a piano prodigy, he graduated from Woodrow Wilson High School in Tacoma, Washington, where he sat next to serial killer Ted Bundy in trigonometry. He had already written and performed a symphony for piano and orchestra. Durkee attended the Berklee College of Music in Boston on scholarship 1967 before returning to his native Washington state.

He taught at the K-12 level at the Bush School in Seattle as well in higher education at Evergreen State College in Olympia, Washington and Cornish College of the Arts in Seattle.

Durkee spent most of his career in Seattle as musical director for local productions of Hair and Tommy (featuring a young Bette Midler) as well as director of the Teatro Zinzanni, a "circus dinner theater" in Seattle. He would later serve as Midler's musical director. He also wrote ballets for the Pacific Northwest Ballet, scores for the Seattle Repertory Theatre, music for the 1979 experimental film The Legend of Black Thunder Mountain; and created a comic opera for children, The Magical Marriage, for Seattle Opera.

Durkee's musical versatility led him to create jingles and other Ad music for the Chiat/Day advertising agency in Los Angeles. Durkee's sense of humor fits in well at the agency known for its quirky approach in jingles created for clients such as Apple, Honda, 7–11, and Yamaha.

== Takin' Care of Business ==
The original studio version, recorded at Kaye-Smith Studios in Seattle, Washington in late 1973, features prominent piano, played by Durkee in one take. Randy Bachman had repeatedly claimed that Durkee was delivering pizzas to the studio, and convinced the band upon hearing playbacks of "Takin' Care of Business" that the song needed a piano part that he could play. Bachman claimed the band then searched for Durkee before he left the studio to get the piano part added.

However, Robbie Bachman, media sources and Durkee himself have stated that the "pizza guy" story was false. Durkee was actually at the studio as a musician, recording advertisement jingles in the next room, when summoned by sound engineer Buzz Richmond. According to this version of events, Durkee had only a few minutes to spare due to paid-by-the-hour musicians waiting in the other studio and, quickly conferring with Randy Bachman, scribbled down the chords (on a pizza box). Without listening to the song beforehand, he recorded the piano part in one take. Durkee was paid $90 (US) for his contributions, which was the rate in 1973 for a union musician playing one session.
