= Gregory Markel =

American singer

- Origin: Los Angeles, California, United States
- Genres: Progressive rock, rock
- Website: www.gregorymarkel.com Infuse Creative

Gregory Markel is an American former Warner Bros. artist, founder of Infuse Creative, LLC, singer and current member of alt-rock band, All In Your Head. In the early 1990s, he was a member of American rock band Altered State, as a vocalist, guitarist and songwriter. Markel is the winner of the 2016 Peace Song Award in the pop/rock category for the song, "Surrender Now." The "Barcelona" project was a tribute to the singer Freddie Mercury and opera diva Montserrat Caballé, produced by Dick Williams, mixed by Grammy-winning engineer John Jaszcz, and mastered by Erwin Maas at eMastering.

== Songs ==
"I Know Something You Don't"
"The Corporation Tells You"
"Strong As I Am"
"Into The Strange"
"Until You Come Back To Me"
"Doubt"
"I've Got To Believe"
"Moth In The Light"
"As Purposeful As The Sun"
"Avenging Angel Of Sierra Leone"
"Song To The Siren"

=== Poetry ===
death, transfiguration, and the emergence of joy
can you hear it?
reunion
waiting and watching
eureka

== Discography ==
=== Studio albums and EPs ===
The Living Daylights - EP 1984
The Prime Movers - EP 1985
Altered State - Altered State - 1991
Altered State - :[dos]: - 1993
Gregory Markel - Gorg Demos 1 - 2001

=== Singles ===
The Living Daylights
"Colleen" / "Neelloc" - 1984
"Katbox Beach" - 1984

The Prime Movers
"Strong As I Am" / "Kahlua House" - 1985
"On The Trail" - 1985
"Strong As I Am" - 1986
"Strong As I Am" / "Kahlua House" -2007
"The Outsider" - 2011
"She's Got Pages" - 2011
"On The Trail" - 2012

Altered State
"Step Into My Groove" / "Like Father" / "Drifting" - 1991
"Ghost Beside My Bed" - 1991
"Made Of Gasoline" (demo) - 1992
"Strong As I Am" (Acoustic Studio) - 1993
"Life On A Skateboard" - 1993
"Darkness Visible" - 1993

Gregory Markel
"Surrender Now" - 2014 (Winner 2016 Global Peace Song Award)

== Infuse Creative ==
Infuse Creative, is a digital marketing/public relations, reputation, development and security agency founded in 2001. It has offices/personnel in Los Angeles, Houston and Manhattan. Infuse Creative clients include Sony, California Legislative Bureau, Universal, Mazda, Disney, Colony Capital, Gibson Musical Instruments, New Line Cinema, Warner Bros., TomCruise.com, Participant Media, Pacificare, The BBC, Ed Hardy, Led Zeppelin, Lord of the Rings, CBS, FOX, The National Geographic Channel, Relativity Media, Roadside Attractions, Transcendental Meditation, ArtistDirect, and Realty Executives International.
