= Altered State (Altered State album) =

Studio album by Altered State
- Released: August 27, 1991
- Genre: Progressive rock, alternative rock
- Length: 45:00
- Label: Warner Bros. Records
- Producer: Tony Berg

Altered State chronology
Altered State (1991)	Dos (1993)

Singles from "Altered State"
- 1. "Step Into My Groove" Released: 1991; 2. "Step Into My Groove CD5" Released: 1991; 3. "Ghost Beside My Bed" Released: 1992

Altered State is the debut record of the American progressive rock band Altered State, released August 27, 1991 on Warner Bros. Records. The album's first single, Step Into My Groove, received radio and MTV airplay along with two alternate versions of the song went to radio as well, the Psychedelic Mix and Psychedelic Instrumental recordings, produced by Ben Grosse.

The Los Angeles Times hailed the album as one of the Year's Best in 1991.

Bill Hard of The Hard Report dubbed the record one of the best of 1992.

== Track listing ==
1. "Step Into My Groove" (Markel/Moreland/Mathewson)
2. "Ghost Beside My Bed" (Markel)
3. "Heal Me" (Markel)
4. "Do What You Want" (Markel/Mathewson)
5. "Reunion" (Markel/Mathewson)
6. "One Small Boat" (Markel)
7. "Outside" (Markel)
8. "Surrender Now" (Markel/Mathewson)
9. "Drifting" (Markel/Mathewson/Moreland)
10. "Like Father"(Markel)
11. "Until The Music Ends" (Markel/Mathewson)

== Personnel ==
- Gregory Markel: vocals, guitar
- Curtis Mathewson: guitar, bass, vocals
- Chip Moreland: drums, percussion, vocals

== Additional personnel ==
- Tony Berg: guitar
- Nick South: bass
- Jonathan Melvoin: percussion

== Production ==
- Tony Berg: Producer
- Bob Clearmountain: Mixer
- Susan Rogers: Engineer
- Ken Jordan: Engineer
- Jeffrey Lord-Alge: Engineer
- Susan Rogers: Engineer
- Assistant Engineers: George Cowen, Gina Immel, Neil Azron, Chris Steinmetz and Red Relasatte
- Designer: John Van Hammersveld
- Recorded at: Sunset Sound, Cherokee, Zeitgist, A&M, Acme, Studio 55 and Rumbo
- Mixed in: Bearsville, New York
