= Dread Zeppelin =

American rock band (1989–2016)

- Clockwise from left: Jah Paul Jo, Ed Zeppelin, Carl Jah, Put-Mon, Charlie Haj, Tortelvis

Background information
- Origin: Sierra Madre, California, U.S.
- Genres: Reggae rock
- Years active: 1989–2016
- Label: I.R.S.
- Past members: Carl Jah; Jah Paul Jo; Cheese; Ed Zeppelin; Fresh Cheese; Rasta Li-Mon; Jah Jah Gabor; Fernandez; Derf Nosna Haj; Tortelvis; Put-Mon (a.k.a. Butt-Boy); Spice; Bob Knarley; Ziggy Knarley; Charlie Haj
- Website: dreadzeppelin.com

Dread Zeppelin was an American reggae rock band. Formed in 1989 in Sierra Madre, California, the band combined hard rock and reggae styles with humor. They are best known for performing the songs of Led Zeppelin in a reggae style as sung by a Las Vegas Elvis impersonator. They also performed songs originally by Elvis Presley, Bob Marley and The Yardbirds. The group toured extensively around the world during their tenure with I.R.S. Records.

== Career ==
=== 1986–1989: The Prime Movers ===
The nucleus of Dread Zeppelin, bassist Put-Mon (Gary Putman), drummer Cheese (Curt Lichter) and guitarist Jah Paul Jo (Joseph "Severs" Ramsey), were from a Pasadena, California group called The Prime Movers. Signed to Island Records in 1986, The Prime Movers had some success in the UK with singles "On The Trail" and "Dark Western Night". The late Stuart Adamson of Big Country contributed his trademark E-Bow guitar to "Dark Western Night" and another Prime Mover song, "Strong As I Am", was featured in Michael Mann's motion picture thriller, Manhunter.

When The Prime Movers ended in 1989, Jah Paul Jo hatched the idea for a new group that would call itself "Dread Zeppelin". Aside from the three original members, the band recruited guitarist Carl Jah (Carl Haasis) and 300-pound Vegas-era Elvis impersonator Tortelvis (Greg Tortell). The band supposedly met Tortelvis when he rammed his milk float into the back of the band's car. Longtime graphic artist for The Prime Movers, Bryant Fernandez, was brought in as conga-man Ed Zeppelin.

The concept for Dread Zeppelin may be less bizarre than it seems. Notably, Led Zeppelin did make a recording which reflected a prominent reggae influence, the 1973 song "D'yer Mak'er". Also, the band frequently performed Elvis Presley songs in concert, often presented as a medley which occasionally flirted with self-parody. (Led Zeppelin met Elvis briefly in 1974 after attending one of his concerts in Los Angeles.)

=== 1989: Birdcage Records ===
The first Dread Zeppelin recording was meant to be a goof on Led Zeppelin's 45 single "Immigrant Song" and its sought-after non-LP B-Side "Hey Hey What Can I Do". Produced by Jah Paul Jo and Rasta Li-Mon (Lee Manning) and released on their indie Birdcage Records label, the single sold amazingly well and represses featured the seven inch 45 RPM in a rasta rainbow of colors: red (original), green, yellow, blue, white and clear vinyl. All early Dread Zeppelin recordings and most of the band's first album Un-Led-Ed were recorded at the home studio of Dave Stewart of Eurythmics, where Rasta Li-Mon was a house engineer.

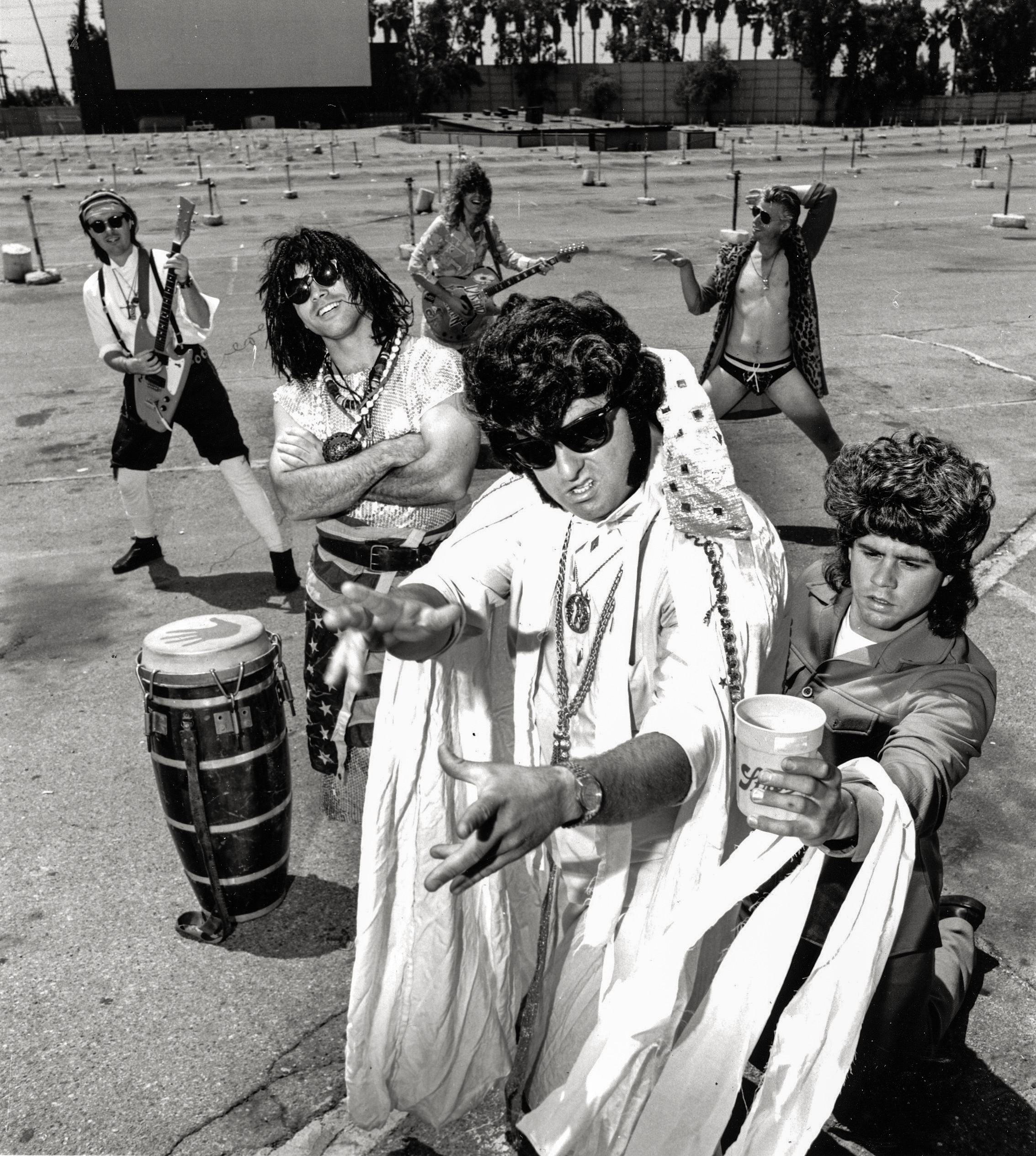
Dread Zeppelin at the Edwards Drive-In, Arcadia, California, 1989

After the success of "Immigrant Song", a second single, "Whole Lotta Love/Tour-telvis: A Bad Trip", was released on Birdcage Records. A third, "Your Time is Gonna Come/Woodstock (live)", was released not as a single but as part of a singles compilation entitled Komm Gib Mir Deine Zeppelin (a play on the title of the German version of The Beatles' song "I Want to Hold Your Hand"). There was also a live cassette issued by Birdcage, but only to members of The Dread Zeppelin fan club, called Live On Blueberry Cheesecake.

=== 1990: I.R.S. years ===
In 1990, Dread Zeppelin were signed to Miles Copeland III's IRS label. Their first album, Un-Led-Ed, consisted of more covers taken from Led Zeppelin and Led Zeppelin II, plus "Black Dog" from Led Zeppelin's untitled fourth album. Original drummer Cheese (Curt Lichter) left the band just after recording Un-Led-Ed. He was replaced by Fresh Cheese (Paul Maselli). Shortly before Un-Led-Ed was released, the original Ed Zeppelin (percussion and Reggae Dub) was replaced by his identical twin brother who was the former lead singer of local LA bands: Rampage, Blue Frontier and Public Eye.

Un-Led-Ed was successful. In autumn 1990, Dread Zeppelin took a three-week break from touring and recorded their second album, 5,000,000* *Tortelvis Fans Can't Be Wrong. In addition to the usual "Zeppelin in a reggae style", this album also featured a cover of Bob Marley's "Stir It Up" as well as three original songs.

For the next album, the band had planned a rock opera, Albert, about a rock critic who wanted to be a star (based loosely on the real rock critic Albert Goldman), but this never materialized. The plan changed to an album of disco covers, It's Not Unusual. Both Ed Zeppelin and Fresh Cheese had left the band after 5,000,000* *Tortelvis Fans Can't Be Wrong, and during rehearsals for the new album, Tortelvis also quit. Bassist Put-Mon (Gary Putman) took over the vocals, assuming the name Gary B.I.B.B. It's Not Unusual featured guest spots by both Screamin' Jay Hawkins and Randy Bachman.

Whether it was the public's resistance to disco, or the lack of Dread's popular frontman, Tortelvis, sales of It's Not Unusual were disappointing. The band was dropped by IRS and for all intents and purposes, had dissolved.

=== 1993: Hot & Spicy Beanburger ===
Dread Zeppelin with Michael Hutchence of INXS

Unknown to the band, Dread Zeppelin were being sought by Australian rock band INXS to be the support band on their US tour. INXS were fans of Dread Zeppelin. Tortelvis was persuaded to return to the band; however, without a recording contract, he could only perform at the May 8, 1993, show at The Barker Hangar in Santa Monica. Dread Zeppelin returned to the studio. With Jah Paul Jo and Rasta Li-Mon again producing, they recorded Hot & Spicy Beanburger, a 1993 release on Birdcage Records.

In the spring of 1994, Dread Zeppelin appeared in the feature film National Lampoon's Last Resort and provided a song for the closing credits. Carl Jah (Carl Haasis) and Ed Zeppelin left the band shortly thereafter.

With Put-Mon moving from bass to lead guitar and the addition of David Raven (drums), bassist Derf Nosna Haj (Freddie Johnson) and Fernandez (Pete Burke) on conga and toast, Dread Zeppelin recorded No Quarter Pounder. Released by Birdcage Records in 1995, No Quarter Pounder would be the band's final Birdcage CD as Jah Paul Jo left the group shortly after its release.

=== 1996: Imago ===
The remaining members of Dread Zeppelin signed onto Imago Records and released The Fun Sessions, a collection of classic rock covers. It was the first all non-Led Zeppelin cover recording with the exception of "BBWAGS (Butt-Boy's Wearin' a Girls' Shirt)" written by Gary Putman. This would be Derf Nosna Haj (Freddie Johnson) and Fernandez (Pete Burke) last recording with the band. After the Imago release, Carl Jah and Ed Zeppelin returned to the band.

=== 1999: Cleopatra ===
The band then signed to Cleopatra Records and recorded De-jah Voodoo in 1999. The recording was produced by bassist Bob Knarley (Howard Ulyate) and includes 11 Led Zeppelin covers and two tracks written by the band (Putman, Ulyate, Fernandez, Tortell, and Boerin).

De-jah Voodoo was later re-released with a new cover and title (Re-Led-Ed); some versions include an acoustic version of "Hey Hey What Can I Do" as a bonus track.

=== 2000–2011: Cash Cow ===
In 1995 Dread Zeppelin had a new production company, Cash Cow, run by original members Gary Putman (Butt-Boy) and Greg Tortell (Tortelvis), which had produced the Fun Sessions. They released the live album Front Yard Bar*B*Que in December 1996 and the all-original album Spam Bake (a take-off of the Elvis movie sound recordings of the 1960s) in November 1997.

Also released on Cash Cow Records were the band's first full length Christmas recording Presents in 2002, followed by Chicken and Ribs 2004; both were produced by Bob Knarley. In February 2008 the band released Bar Coda, produced by Spice (Cris Boerin). Other Cash Cow releases included the DVDs Jah-La-Palooza 2004 and Live in Minne-Jah-Polis 2002. The album SoSo (the title referencing Led Zeppelin's fourth album), followed in 2011, produced by Spice.

Lead singer Tortelvis sang "The Star-Spangled Banner" at Bank One Ballpark, now known as Chase Field, in Phoenix, Arizona on May 27, 2005. He had been scheduled to sing the song at a Minnesota Twins game in 1990, but Roseanne Barr's notorious version quashed that opportunity.

=== 2012-2016 ===
Carl Jah released a solo album in 2012; in 2014, founding guitarist Jah Paul Jo died following years of poor health. Dread Zeppelin toured regularly through 2014; Putman is the only member of Dread Zeppelin to have performed on every record and played every live show to date.

They last performed live on April 2, 2016.

== Members ==
- Tortelvis (Greg Tortell) - vocals
- Butt-Boy a.k.a. Put-Mon a.k.a. Gary B.I.B.B. (Gary Putman) - bass (1986-1993), vocals (1992-1993), guitars (1993-present)
- Spice (Cris Boerin) - keyboards, percussion
- Bob Knarley (Howard Ulyate) - bass
- Ziggy Knarley (Chip Moreland) - drums
- Charlie Haj (Earle Rothwell) - manservant

=== Former members ===
- Carl Jah (Carl Haasis) - guitars
- Jah Paul Jo (Joseph "Severs" Ramsey) - guitars
- Cheese (Curt Lichter) - drums
- Ed Zeppelin (Bryant Fernandez, later Bruce Fernandez) - percussion
- Fresh Cheese (Paul Maselli) - drums
- Rasta Li-Mon (Lee Manning) - engineer, producer
- Tuna Melt a.k.a. Jah Jah Gabor - bass
- Fernandez (Peter Burke) - percussion
- Fuzzy Buzzman/Derf Nosna Haj (Freddie Johnson) - bass

== Discography ==
=== Studio albums ===
- Un-Led-Ed (1990), IRS Records
- 5,000,000* *Tortelvis Fans Can't Be Wrong (1991), IRS Records
- Rock'n Roll (1991), JVC Records (Japan only)
- It's Not Unusual (1992), IRS Records
- Hot & Spicy Beanburger (1993), Birdcage Records
- The First No-Elvis (1994), Birdcage Records
- No Quarter Pounder (1995), Birdcage Records
- The Fun Sessions (1996), Imago
- Ruins (1996), Birdcage Records
- Spam Bake (1998)
- De-jah Voodoo (2000) (reissued in 2004 as Re-Led-Ed)
- Presents (2002)
- Chicken and Ribs (2004)
- Bar Coda (2007)
- Best of the IRS years (2009)
- Soso (2011)

=== Live albums ===
- Front Yard Bar*B*Que (1996)
- The Song Remains Insane (1998), TWA Records (two-CD Australia-only set)
- Haunted Houses O' the Holy (1999)
- Live - Live at Larry's (2002)
- Live - Hots On for Fresno (2003)

=== Singles ===
- "Immigrant Song" / "Hey Hey What Can I Do" (1989), Birdcage Records (7" clear, blue, green, red, white and yellow vinyl)
- "Whole Lotta Love" / "Tour-Telvis: A Bad Trip" (1989), Birdcage Records (7" black and pink vinyl)
- "Heartbreaker (At the End of Lonely Street)" (1990), IRS Records (UK CD single) (Australia #138)
- "Your Time Is Gonna Come" (edit) (1990), IRS Records (UK CD single)
- "Stairway to Heaven" (1991), IRS Records (UK CD single) (Australia #175)

=== Extended plays ===
- Komm Gib Mir Deine Zeppelin (1989), Birdcage Records (six-track EP)
- Live on Blueberry Cheesecake (1992), Birdcage Records (seven-track fan club EP)

=== DVD ===
- Live at the Cabooze in Minne-jah-polis (2003)
- Jah-La-Palooza (2004)
- Pure Inner-Tainment (2009)

=== Documentaries ===
- Dread Zeppelin: A Song of Hope
