= Altered State (Stu Dent album) =

Studio album by Stu Dent
- Released: October 2, 2001
- Genre: Christian hip hop, underground hip hop
- Length: 74:04
- Label: Deepspace5; Sonic Unyon
- Producer: Cyclone, JB, Mr. Rictor

Sev Statik chronology
The Point Man (1996)	Altered State (2001)	Severed Remaynz (2002)

Altered State is the first studio album by Albany, New York hip hop musician Stu Dent, better known by the moniker Sev Statik. Sev Statik, real name Joseph Evans, created the Stu Dent pseudonym due to contractual obligations with Tunnel Rats, a group of which he was a member at the time. Evans' debut studio album as Sev Statik, Speak Life, would be released in 2002. Altered State features guest appearances by, among others, members of Tunnel Rats, All Bully, and Deepspace5, all of which Evans was a member. The album was released on October 2, 2001, through Deepspace5 Recordings, and was received modestly by critics.

== Background ==
Joseph Evans began performing hip hop in the Albany area since the early 1990s, and soon adopted the moniker Sev Statik. He co-founded Deepspace5 in 1997, and joined the Los Angeles-based group Tunnel Rats that same year. In 1999, he began recording songs for a full-length studio album entitled Speak Life. However, to due a dispute with the Tunnel Rats' label, that project was temporarily shelved. Evans had agreed with Tunnel Rats not to release any material under the name Sev Statik until the group released its next studio album. So, instead, he recorded an album to be released under a different moniker, Stu Dent. The album, Altered State, features appearances from numerous artist, including some of Evan's fellow Tunnel Rats and Deepspace5 members as well as members from All Bully, an Albany-based group of which Evan's was part. Production was handled entirely by All Bully member JB except for two tracks, "Phyzical Mental" by Cyclone and "Born Invisible" by Mr. Rictor.

== Release and reception ==
Professional ratings
Review scores
Source	Rating
Altrap.com	7/10

Altered State was released on October 2, 2001, through Deepspace5 Recordings and Sonic Unyon Distribution. The critical reception was generally positive. P the Uptownkid at Altrap.com scored the album at seven out of ten, praising the production values, guest features, and lyrics and delivery by Stu Dent. HipHopHotSpot.com was also positive toward the album, claiming that "Through exceptional flow, metaphor, intensity, and real tight conceptual rhymes Stu Dent brings fans into the focal point of classic entertainment that never runs dry." However, the reviewer did criticize the inclusion of the introductory track and the two skits, feeling that those tracks only interrupted the flow of the album. They also expressed some frustration at the lack of track list numbering on the CD's packaging. Urban Smarts gave a rather mixed opinion of the album, noting that while it was a solid release, it was nothing exceptional. The reviewer noted in particular an inconsistency in the production quality, opining that while some tracks maintained some interesting beats, others were much less satisfactory.

== Lyrics and style ==
On Altered Life, Stu Dent included lyrical themes and sample taken from the film The Matrix. Labeled as Christian hip hop, Stu Dent includes expressions of his faith on the album. Altrap.com found his approach similar to "the nature of Self Scientific, Encore, and Divine Styler, "where the acknowledgment of living righteously, the praise of God / Allah, and the quest to make it in the world without compromising oneself and the art of Hip-Hop." Musically, Altrap.com compared the release to Company Flow, Mr. Len, Funcrusher Plus, and the output of Definitive Jux, and mentioned that the song "Simply Put" sounds like an early RZA track. HipHopHotSpot.com explained that Stu Dent's "strongest feature is his ability to intertwine conceptual thoughts, and tight rhymes, seemingly with very little effort."

== Track listing ==
All tracks are written by Stu Dent.

No.	Title	Producer	Length
1.	"Intro"	JB	0:40
2.	"Missing Time"	JB	4:05
3.	"We Don't Want That" (featuring JB and Soulheir the Manchild)	JB	3:46
4.	"Dead Decay Shun" (featuring Dezignator)	JB	4:40
5.	"Phyzical Mental"	Cyclone	4:38
6.	"The Coliseum" (featuring Macho of New Breed)	JB	3:57
7.	"Assisted Suicide" (featuring Soulheir the Manchild)	JB	4:45
8.	"DS5 News (skit)"	JB	0:17
9.	"Say Again"	JB	3:16
10.	"Alone" (featuring Sage)	JB	4:17
11.	"Fast Lane" (featuring Capture One)	JB	4:15
12.	"M.O.G. (skit)"	JB	0:36
13.	"The Messenger"	JB	4:19
14.	"A Warrior's Existence" (featuring Kaboose)	JB	4:30
15.	"Born Invisible"	Mr. Rictor	3:25
16.	"Skitzofriendamine" (featuring Ajax the Ordinary Oddball)	JB	4:07
17.	"Simply Put" (featuring Capture One and Drastic)	JB	4:00
18.	"Symphonic Precision" (featuring JB)	JB	4:32
19.	"Time's Process"	JB	5:34
20.	"Banger" (featuring Ajax the Ordinary Oddball)	JB	4:25
