= Altered State (band) =

American progressive rock band

Background information
- Origin: Huntington Beach, California, U.S.
- Genres: Progressive rock, alternative rock
- Years active: 1990–1995
- Labels: Warner Bros. Records
- Members: Gregory Markel; Chip Moreland
- Past members: Curtis Mathewson; Riz Story; Paul Edwards; Bob Knarley; Christian Nesmith

Altered State was an American progressive rock band based in Huntington Beach, California, active in the 1990s. Influenced by Pink Floyd, Rush, Led Zeppelin and U2, they have been described as "an inventive band with unique arrangements, melodic vocals and great harmonies."

== History ==
Altered State was formed in 1990 in Huntington Beach, California by vocalist/guitarist Gregory Markel, drummer Chip Moreland and guitarist Curtis Mathewson, previously performing together in the band Show of Hands. In 1990, Altered State signed with Warner Bros. Records

In 1991, the band released their eponymous debut album and the first single, Step Into My Groove. The 1992 single Ghost Beside My Bed, went #1 at Rock Radio in several states in the U.S. It was the most requested song on KQLZ Pirate Radio, the station set up a special show for the band at The Roxy in Hollywood, California. Gregory Markel's performance that night is highlighted in Vicki Hamilton's book Appetite for Dysfunction: A Cautionary Tale.

In 1993, the band released :[dos]:

== Members ==
- Gregory Markel – lead vocals, guitar (1990–1995)
- Chip Moreland – drums, vocals (1990–1995)
- Curtis Mathewson – guitar, vocals, keyboards (1990–1994)
- Riz Story – bass (debut tour) (1991–1992)
- Paul Edwards – bass (1992–1994)

== Discography ==
- Altered State (August 27, 1991)
- :[dos]: (October 5, 1993)

Singles

- "Step into My Groove" (1991)
- "Step into My Groove" – Psychedelic Mix & Psychedelic Instrumental (1991)
- "Ghost Beside My Bed" (1992)
- "Strong as I Am"/"Strong As I Am" – Acoustic (1993)
- "Life on a Skateboard" (1994)
- "Darkness Visible" (1994)

Videos

- "Step Into My Groove" (1991)
- "Telemusica: Altered State Step into My Groove interview" (1991)
- "Can You Hear My Voice" – 1988 Rough Demo/Band Footage (2013)
- "Ghost Beside My Bed" 20th Anniversary Video Interview (2014)

Demos/live releases

- "Made of Gasoline" – 1992 Rough Demo (1993)
- "End Summer" – 1992 Rough Demo (2012)
- "Can You Hear My Voice" – 1988 Rough Demo (2012)
- "Hyper-Violence" – 1992 4 Track Demo (2012)
- "Walkin' with the Wounded" – Home Rough Sketch Demo (2014)
- "Until the Music Ends" – WLLZ Live from The Magic Bag 1992 (2015)

Songs covered by other artists

- Lane Lane (2000) – Ballad Collection II and Ballad Collection Special Edition - "Ghost Beside My Bed"
- Divinorum (2006) – Ravensong – "Life on a Skateboard"
- Rusty Anderson/Gregory Markel (2005) – Live OC Pavilion – "Ghost Beside My Bed"
