= National Lampoon's Last Resort =

- Directed by: Rafal Zielinski
- Written by: Patrick Labyorteaux; Damian Lee
- Produced by: Damian Lee; Jeff Sackman
- Starring: Corey Feldman; Corey Haim; Maureen Flannigan; Demetra Hampton; Robert Mandan; Geoffrey Lewis
- Music by: Ronald J. Weiss
- Release date: April 29, 1994
- Running time: 90 minutes
- Language: English

National Lampoon's Last Resort (also known as Last Resort or National Lampoon's Scuba School) is a 1994 direct-to-video comedy film directed by Rafal Zielinski. The film stars Corey Feldman and Corey Haim as Sam and Dave, two friends who are visiting a Caribbean island resort.

== Plot ==
Sam and Dave, after being fired from a fast food outlet and getting evicted, are magically transported to Sam's uncle's island. Sam and Dave are asked to help save the island. The band Dread Zeppelin perform the film's theme song as credits roll at the end.

== Cast ==
- Corey Feldman as Sam
- Corey Haim as Dave
- Geoffrey Lewis as Rex Carver, Sam's Uncle
- Maureen Flannigan as Sonja, a scuba diving instructor
- Demetra Hampton as Alex
- Robert Mandan as Hemlock, a corporate raider determined to take over the island.
- Patrick Labyorteaux as Young Hemlock
- Milton Selzer as Irv
- Tony Longo as Rob
- Michael Ralph as Flash
- Zelda Rubinstein as Old Hermit
- Brandy Ledford as Mermaid
- Dread Zeppelin (Jah Paul Jo, Carl Jah, Put-Mon, Ed Zeppelin, Spice and Tortelvis) as themselves

== Production ==
Filmed in the Cayman Islands and La Habra Heights, California, United States

== Reception ==
Entertainment Weekly said, "the latest movie offering bearing the Lampoon name, the too-aptly titled National Lampoon’s Last Resort, hits bottom in a way the magazine’s founders surely never contemplated: Not only is this mutation mind-bogglingly inept and bland, it’s also inexcusably unfunny.
