= Screamin' Jay Hawkins =

American musician, actor, boxer (1929–2000)

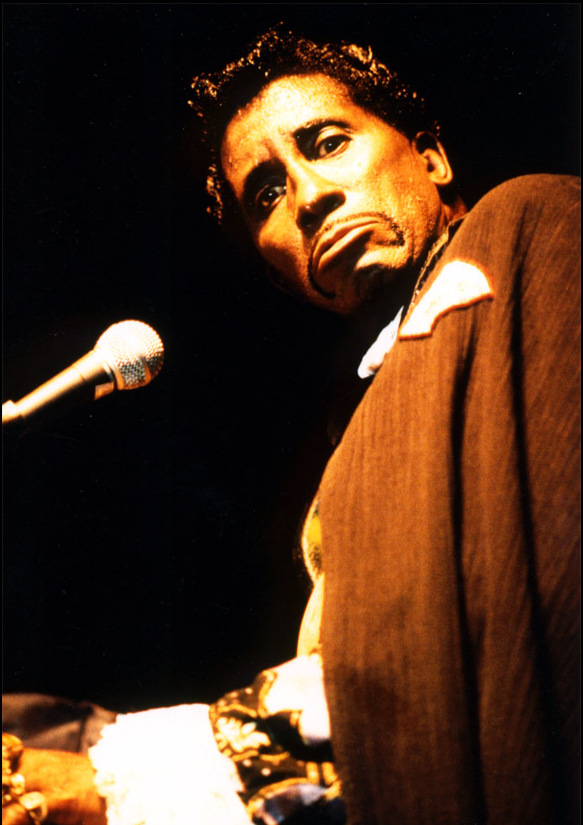
- Hawkins in concert, 1995

Background information
- Also known as: Jay Hawkins
- Born: Jalacy J. Hawkins; July 18, 1929; Cleveland, Ohio, U.S.
- Died: February 12, 2000 (aged 70) Neuilly-sur-Seine, France
- Genres: Blues; rhythm and blues; soul; rock and roll; shock rock
- Occupations: Singer; songwriter; musician; actor; film producer; boxer
- Instruments: Vocals; piano; guitar
- Years active: 1951–2000
- Labels: Okeh; Epic; Philips

Jalacy J. "Screamin' Jay" Hawkins (July 18, 1929 – February 12, 2000) was an American singer-songwriter, musician, and actor. Famed chiefly for his powerful, shouting vocal delivery and wildly theatrical performances of songs such as "I Put a Spell on You", he sometimes used macabre props onstage, making him an early pioneer of shock rock.

== Early life ==
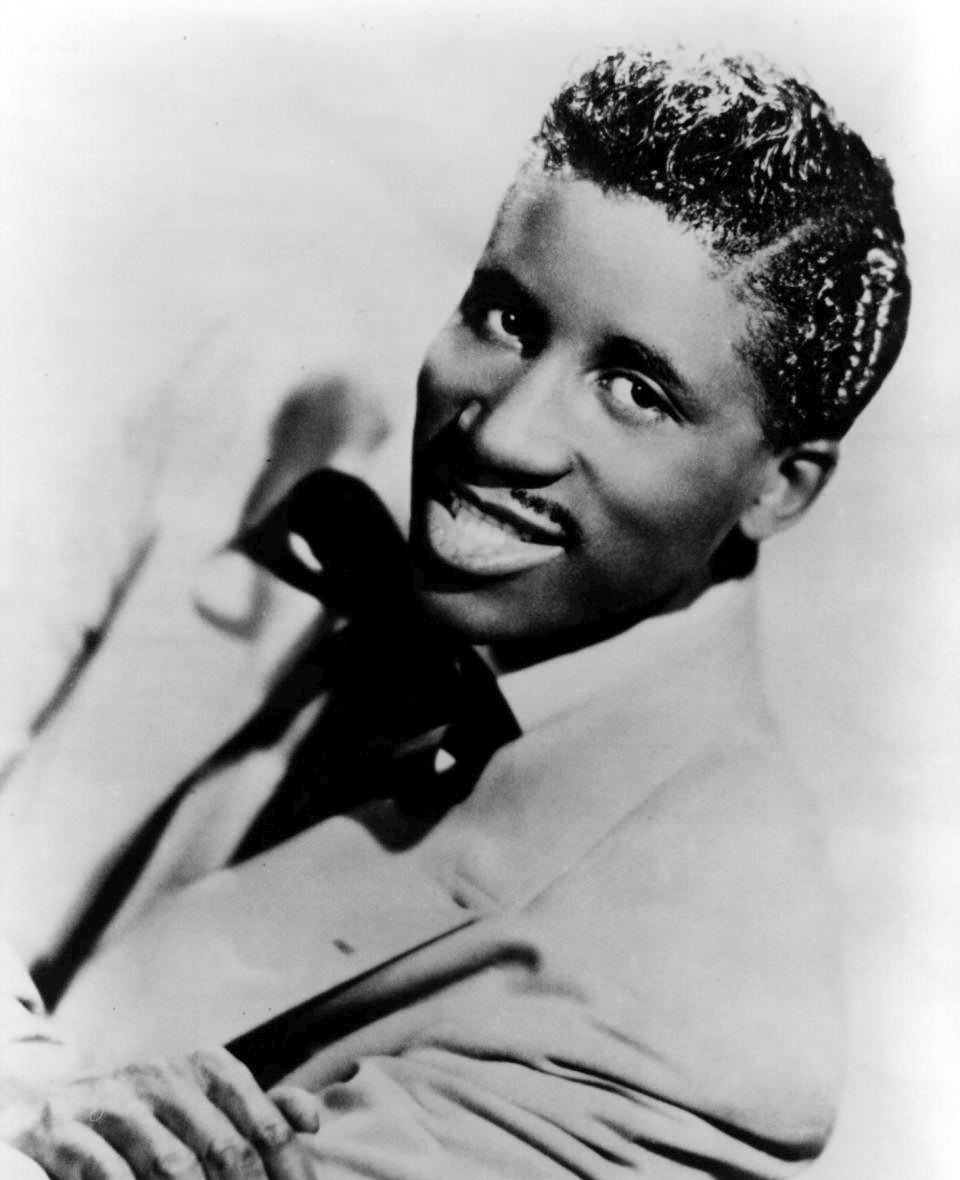
Hawkins in 1957

Hawkins was born and raised in Cleveland, Ohio. He had three older sisters, but his mother decided to put him into foster care. He grew up in the boarding house his foster mother owned. Hawkins studied classical piano as a child and learned guitar in his 20s. In a 1993 interview, Hawkins recounts telling his music tutor:

...to leave before I make your life miserable [...] because with the type of music I want to play. The things I want to do with music and don't want to do it the old conventional way that everybody knows. I want to come up with my own ideas. I've got all the information that I need to get from you to do what I want, now if you stick around, I'm going to make your life miserable.

His initial goal was to become an opera singer (Hawkins cited Paul Robeson as his musical idol in interviews), but when his initial ambitions failed, he began his career as a conventional blues singer and pianist. Other influences included Mario Lanza, Enrico Caruso, Lionel Hampton, Dizzy Gillespie, Charles Brown, Amos Milburn, Wynonie Harris, Nellie Lutcher, Roy Brown, Jimmy Witherspoon, Eddie "Cleanhead" Vinson, Roy Milton, Elmore James, Lightnin' Hopkins, and H-Bomb Ferguson.

Three months after World War II ended, he dropped out of East Technical High School and joined the US Army with a forged birth certificate (aged 16). He was stationed at Fort Bliss. During this time, he entertained the troops as part of his service. Hawkins was an avid boxer during his years in the US Army boxing circuit. He later claimed that he won several boxing titles; however, there is no record of his wins. He also told friends and reporters various embellished stories about attending Yale University and the University of Cincinnati Conservatory. Additionally, he claimed he fought in World War II and the Korean War and killed enemy combatants.

== Career ==
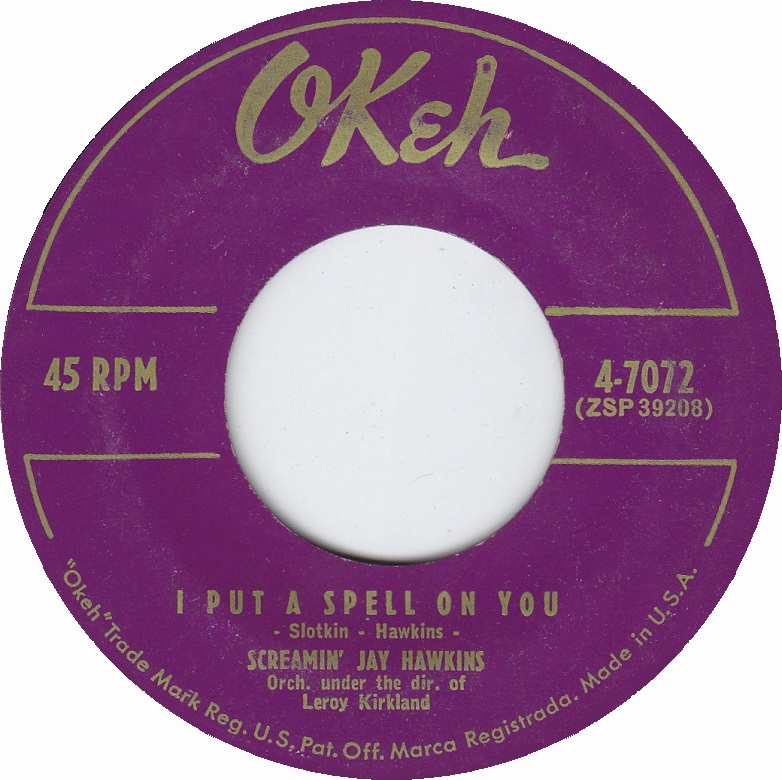
"I Put A Spell On You" record label

=== Early career ===
In 1951, Screamin’ Jay Hawkins began his career performing vocals and keyboards for Philadelphia guitarist Tiny Grimes, and was subsequently featured on some of Grimes's recordings. When Hawkins later went solo, his first single “Why Did You Waste My Time” was performed with accompaniment from Grimes’ band. In 1956, Hawkins signed with OKeh Records. When Hawkins became a solo performer, he often performed in a stylish wardrobe of leopard skins, red leather, and wild hats.

=== "I Put a Spell on You" ===
Hawkins's most successful recording, "I Put a Spell on You" (1956), was selected as one of The Rock and Roll Hall of Fame's 500 Songs that Shaped Rock and Roll. According to the AllMusic Guide to the Blues, "Hawkins originally envisioned the tune as a refined ballad." The entire band was intoxicated during a recording session where "Hawkins screamed, grunted, and gurgled his way through the tune with utter drunken abandon." The resulting performance was no ballad but instead a "raw, guttural track" that became his greatest commercial success and reportedly surpassed a million copies in sales, although it failed to make the Billboard pop or R&B charts.

Although Hawkins blacked out and was unable to remember the session, he relearned the song from the recorded version. Meanwhile, the record label released a second version of the single, removing most of the grunts that had embellished the original performance; this was in response to complaints about the recording's overt sexuality. Nonetheless it was banned from radio in some areas. Furthermore, the recording attracted the ire of groups such as the NAACP, "which worried that his act would reflect badly on African Americans". Hawkins later credited the uproar with a boost in sales due to the perceived taboo nature of his performances.

Soon after the release of "I Put a Spell on You", radio disc jockey Alan Freed offered Hawkins $300 to emerge from a coffin onstage. Hawkins initially declined, reportedly saying "No black dude gets in a coffin alive – they don't expect to get out!" However, he later relented and soon created an outlandish stage persona in which performances began with the coffin and included "gold and leopard-skin costumes and notable voodoo stage props, such as his smoking skull on a stick – named Henry – and rubber snakes." These props were suggestive of voodoo, but also presented with comic overtones that invited comparison to "a black Vincent Price". Despite the commercial success of the gimmick, Hawkins resented the shock-factor that made him famous. He found it exploitative, and believed it undermined his sincerity as a vocalist and a balladeer. In a 1973 interview, he bemoaned the Screamin' epithet given to him by his label Okeh records, saying "If it were up to me, I wouldn't be Screamin' Jay Hawkins ... James Brown did an awful lot of screamin', but never got called Screamin' James Brown ... Why can't people take me as a regular singer without making a bogeyman out of me?"

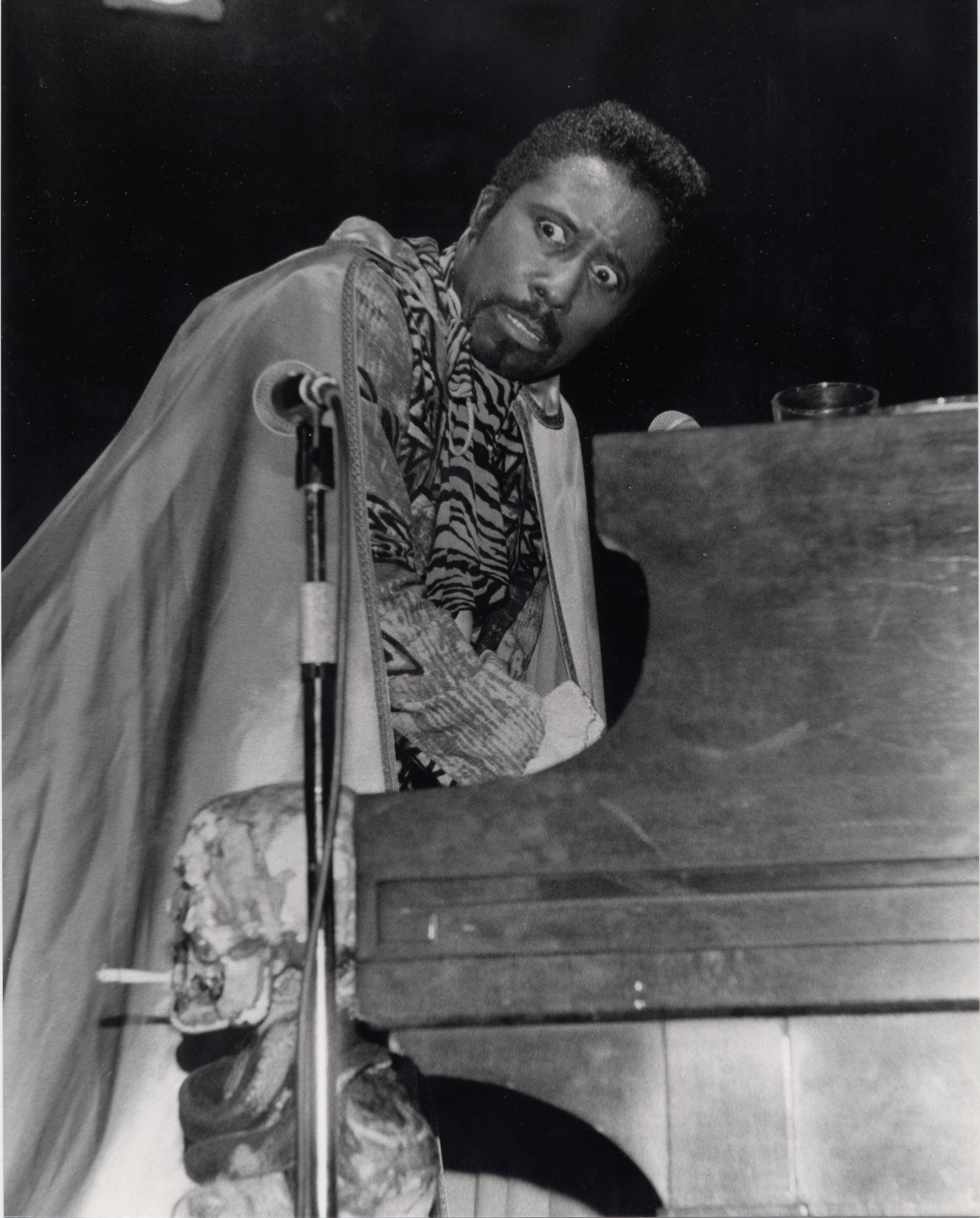
Hawkins performing in 1979

"I Put a Spell On You" became a classic, covered by a variety of artists such as Creedence Clearwater Revival, Nina Simone, Alan Price, The Animals, Them with Van Morrison, Arthur Brown, Bryan Ferry, Buddy Guy, Carlos Santana, Tim Curry, Leon Russell, Joe Cocker, Nick Cave, Marilyn Manson, Mica Paris, David Gilmour, Jeff Beck, Joss Stone, Diamanda Galas, Annie Lennox, and The Pretty Reckless. Hawkins's original version was featured during the show and over the credits of the 2003 The Simpsons episode "I'm Spelling as Fast as I Can".

=== Later career ===
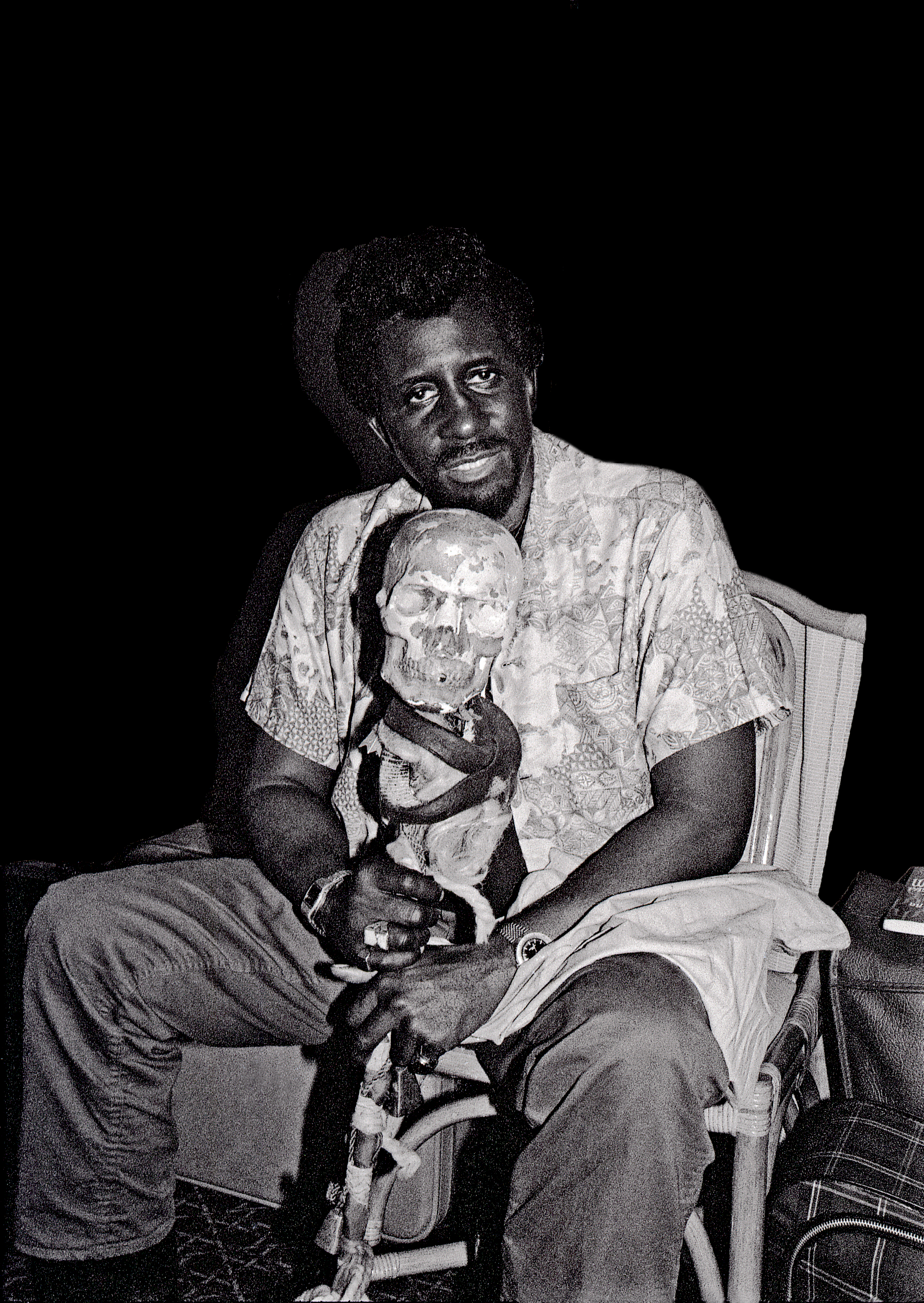
Hawkins in 1984

Hawkins's later releases included the toilet humor song "Constipation Blues" (which included a spoken introduction by Hawkins in which he states he wrote the song because no one had written a blues song before about "real pain"), "Orange Colored Sky", and "Feast of the Mau Mau". Nothing else he released, however, had the monumental success of "I Put a Spell on You". In Paris in 1999 and at the Taste of Chicago festival, he actually performed "Constipation Blues" with a toilet onstage.

He continued to tour and record through the 1960s and 1970s, particularly in Europe, where he was very popular. Hawkins released a single recording of mainstream ballads in 1969, "Too Many Teardrops" and the Hawaiian styled "Makaha Waves" on the flip-side. In February 1976, he suffered facial injuries when he was burned by one of his flaming props while performing with his guitarist Mike Armando at the Virginia Theater in Alexandria, Virginia. He appeared in performance (as himself) in the Alan Freed bio-pic American Hot Wax in 1978. Subsequently, filmmaker Jim Jarmusch featured "I Put a Spell on You" on the soundtrack – and deep in the plot – of his film Stranger Than Paradise (1983), and then cast Hawkins himself as a hotel night clerk in his film Mystery Train. Hawkins also had acting roles in Álex de la Iglesia's Perdita Durango and Bill Duke's adaptation of Chester Himes' A Rage in Harlem.

In 1983, Hawkins relocated to the New York area. In 1984 and 1985, he collaborated with garage rockers the Fuzztones, resulting in the album Screamin' Jay Hawkins and the Fuzztones Live, recorded at Irving Plaza in December 1984. They performed in the 1986 movie Joey.

In 1990, Hawkins performed the song "Sirens Burnin'", which was featured in the 1990 horror film Night Angel.

In July 1991, Hawkins released his album Black Music for White People. The record features covers of two Tom Waits compositions: "Heartattack and Vine" (which, later that year, was used in a European Levi's advertisement without Waits' permission, resulting in a lawsuit), and "Ice Cream Man" (a Waits original and not a cover of the John Brim classic). Hawkins also covered the Waits song "Whistlin' Past the Graveyard" on his album Somethin' Funny Goin' On. In 1993, his version of "Heartattack and Vine" became his only UK hit, reaching No. 42 on the UK singles chart. In 1993, Hawkins moved to France.

When Dread Zeppelin recorded their "disco" album, It's Not Unusual in 1992, producer Jah Paul Jo asked Hawkins to guest. He performed the songs "Jungle Boogie" and "Disco Inferno". He also toured with the Clash and Nick Cave during this period, and not only became a fixture of blues festivals but appeared at many film festivals as well, including the Telluride Film Festival premiere of Mystery Train.

His 1957 single "Frenzy" (found on the early 1980s compilation of the same name) was included in the compilation CD, Songs in the Key of X: Music from and Inspired by the X-Files, in 1996. This song was featured in the show's Season 2 episode "Humbug". It was also covered by the band Batmobile.

In 2001, the Greek director and writer Nicholas Triandafyllidis made the documentary Screamin' Jay Hawkins: I Put a Spell on Me about various stages of his life and career, including a filming of his final live performance, in Athens on December 11, 1999, two months before his death, following a performance the day before in Salonica. In the documentary notable artists such as Jim Jarmusch, Bo Diddley, Eric Burdon, Frank Ash, Arthur Brown and Michael Ochs talked about Screamin' Jay Hawkins's early life, personality and career, and about his incredible talent.

== Personal life ==
From 1962 to 1971, Hawkins lived in Hawaii. He returned to New York after purchasing a home in Hawaii and establishing his own publishing company, sustained by the royalties from covers of "I Put a Spell On You". Hawkins had six marriages; his last wife was 31 at his death. Singing partner Shoutin' Pat Newborn stabbed him in jealousy when he married Virginia Sabellona. He had three children with his first wife and claimed variously to have 57 or 75 children in total. After his death, his friend and biographer Maral Nigolian set up a website to trace these children, identifying 33, at least 12 of whom met at a 2001 reunion.

=== Death ===
Hawkins died of multiple organ failure after emergency surgery to treat an aneurysm on February 12, 2000, in Neuilly-sur-Seine, France. He was 70 years old and lived near Paris.

== Influence ==
Although Hawkins was not a major success as a recording artist, his highly theatrical performances from "I Put a Spell on You" onward earned him a steady career as a live performer for decades afterward, and influenced subsequent acts. He opened for Fats Domino, Tiny Grimes and the Rolling Stones. This exposure in turn influenced rock acts such as Alice Cooper, Tom Waits, the Cramps, Screaming Lord Sutch, Black Sabbath, Creedence Clearwater Revival, Arthur Brown, Led Zeppelin, Marilyn Manson, Rob Zombie, and Glenn Danzig. Vox described Hawkins as a "goth icon".

== Discography ==
=== Studio albums ===
- 1958 At Home with Screamin' Jay Hawkins (Okeh/Epic) – other editions entitled Screamin' Jay Hawkins and I Put a Spell on You
- 1965 The Night and Day of Screamin' Jay Hawkins (Planet/52e Rue Est) – also entitled In the Night and Day of Screamin' Jay Hawkins
- 1969 ...What That Is! (Philips)
- 1970 Because Is in Your Mind (Armpitrubber) (Philips)
- 1972 A Portrait of a Man and His Woman (Hotline) – reissued as I Put a Spell on You and Blues Shouter
- 1977 I Put a Spell on You (Versatile – recordings from 1966 to 1976)
- 1979 Screamin' the Blues (Red Lightnin' – recordings from 1953 to 1970)
- 1979 Lawdy Miss Clawdy (Koala)
- 1983 Real Life (Zeta)
- 1990 The Art of Screamin' Jay Hawkins (Spivey)
- 1991 Black Music for White People (Bizarre/Straight Records/Planet Records)
- 1991 I Shake My Stick at You (Aim)
- 1993 Stone Crazy (Bizarre/Straight/Planet)
- 1994 Somethin' Funny Goin' On (Bizarre/Straight/Planet)
- 1998 At Last (Last Call)

=== Live albums ===
- 1984 Screamin' Jay Hawkins and the Fuzztones Live (Midnight Records)
- 1988 At Home with Jay in the Wee Wee Hours (Midnight Records)
- 1988 Live & Crazy (Blue Phoenix)
- 1991 Screamin' Jay Hawkins and the Chikenhawks: Dr. Macabre (Trade Service)
- 1993 Rated X (Sting S) — recorded in 1970
- 1999 Live at the Olympia, Paris (Last Call) — live with one new studio recording

=== Singles ===
- 1953 "Not Anymore" / "Baptize Me in Wine" [Timely 1004]
- 1954 "I Found My Way to Wine" / "Please Try to Understand Me" [Timely 1005]
- 1955 "You're All of Life to Me" / "Well I Tried" [Wing 90005]
- 1955 "This Is All" / "(She Put The) Whammee (On Me)" [Mercury 70549]
- 1956 "Even Though" / "Talk About Me" [Wing 90055]
- 1956 "I Put a Spell on You" / "Little Demon" [OKeh 7072]
- 1957 "You Made Me Love You" / "Darling, Please Forgive Me" [OKeh 7084]
- 1957 "Frenzy" / "Person to Person" [OKeh 7087]
- 1958 "Alligator Wine" / "There's Something Wrong with You" [OKeh 7101]
- 1960 "I'm So Glad (To Be Back)" / "The Pass" [Red Top 126]
- 1962 "I Hear Voices" / "Just Don't Care" [Enrica 1010]
- 1962 "Ashes" / "Nitty Gritty" w/ Shoutin' Pat (Newborn) [Chancellor 1117]
- 1966 "Poor Folks" / "Your Kind of Love" [Providence 411]
- 1967 "I Put A Spell On You" / "You're An Exception To The Rule" [Decca 32100]
- 1970 "Do You Really Love Me" / "Constipation Blues" [Philips 40645]
- 1973 "Monkberry Moon Delight" / "Sweet Ginny" [Queen Bee 1313]
- 1993 "Heartattack and Vine" / "I Put a Spell on You" / "On the Job" [Columbia 6591092]

=== Multi-artist samplers and budget compilations ===
- 1962 Screamin' Jay Hawkins and Lillian Briggs (Coronet)
- 1963 A Night at Forbidden City (Sounds of Hawaii)
- 1988 "I Put a Spell on You" (Elvira Presents: Haunted Hits LP)
- 1990 "I Put a Spell on You" (Elvira Presents: Haunted Hits CD re-release)
- 1994 "Little Demon" (Elvira Presents: Monster Hits CD)
- 1996 "Frenzy" (Songs in the Key of X – The X Files)

== Filmography ==
=== Film ===
Year	Title	Role	Notes
1966	Day Tripper		Composer; short film
1978	American Hot Wax	Himself	
1986	Joey	Himself	
1988	Two Moon Junction	Blues Club Singer	
1989	Mystery Train	Night Clerk	
1991	A Rage in Harlem	Himself	
1994	De Serge Gainsbourg à Gainsbarre de 1958 – 1991	Himself	Documentary; direct-to-video
1997	Perdita Durango	Adolfo	
1999	Peut-être	Chanteur Bouge	
2001	Screamin' Jay Hawkins: I Put a Spell on Me	Himself	Documentary

=== Television ===
Year	Title	Role	Notes
1957	Alan Freed's Rock 'N' Roll Revue	Himself	TV special
1965	Gadzooks! It's All Happening	Himself	Episode: #1.3
1965	Thank Your Lucky Stars	Himself	Episode: #7.23
1966	The Merv Griffin Show	Himself	Episode: "Tom Ewell, Jacqueline Susann, Aliza Kashi, Screamin' Jay Hawkins, Mitzi McCall, Charlie Brill"
1978	Thank You, Rock 'N' Roll: A Tribute to Alan Freed	Himself	TV special
1989	The Arsenio Hall Show	Himself	Unknown episode
1990	Sunday Night	Himself	Episode: #2.15
1993	Dorothee Rock'n'roll Show	Himself	TV miniseries
2001	Cutting Edge	Himself (archive footage)	Episode: "57 Screaming Kids"
