= Takin' Care of Business (song) =

1974 single by Bachman–Turner Overdrive

- 1976 reissue cover

Single by Bachman–Turner Overdrive

from the album Bachman–Turner Overdrive II
- B-side: "Stonegates"
- Released: May 6, 1974
- Recorded: 1973
- Genre: Hard rock; boogie rock
- Length: 4:50
- Label: Mercury
- Songwriter: Randy Bachman
- Producer: Randy Bachman

Bachman–Turner Overdrive singles chronology
"Let It Ride" (1974)	"Takin' Care of Business" (1974)	"You Ain't Seen Nothing Yet" (1974)

"Takin' Care of Business" is a song written by Randy Bachman and first recorded by Canadian rock group Bachman–Turner Overdrive (BTO) for their 1973 album Bachman–Turner Overdrive II. The lead vocal is sung by the song's composer.

== Development ==
Randy Bachman had developed what would later become "Takin' Care of Business" while still a member of the Guess Who. His original idea was to write about a recording technician who worked on the Guess Who's recordings. This particular technician would take the 8:15 train to get to work, inspiring the lyrics "take the 8:15 into the city".

In the early arrangement for the song, which had the working title "White Collar Worker", the chorus riff and vocal melody were similar to that of the Beatles' "Paperback Writer" (which in turn was inspired by Chuck Berry's "Johnny B. Goode"). When Bachman first played this version for Burton Cummings, Cummings declared that he was ashamed of him and that The Guess Who would never record the song because the Beatles would sue them.

Bachman still felt like the main riff and verses were good, it was only when the song got to the chorus that everyone hated it. While BTO was still playing smaller venues in support of its first album, Bachman was driving into Vancouver for a gig and listening to the radio when he heard local DJ Daryl B's catch phrase "We're takin' care of business". Lead vocalist Fred Turner's voice gave out before the band's last set that night. Bachman sang some cover songs to get through the last set, and on a whim, he told the band to play the C, B-flat and F chords (a I-VII-IV progression) over and over, and he sang "White Collar Worker" with the new words "Takin' Care of Business" inserted into the chorus. Recalled Randy: "When we finished the song that night, people kept clapping, stomping, and shouting 'takin' care of business' over and over. So we picked up the tempo again and reprised the song for another ten minutes. Afterwards, we all knew we had something."

After this, he rewrote the lyrics to "White Collar Worker" with a new chorus and the title "Takin' Care of Business". The new lyrics also take a self-ironic glance at the idea of glamorous rock stars who do not really need to work, contrasted with working-class men, in a vein that prefigured Dire Straits' "Money for Nothing" a decade later. Along with this he wrote a revised guitar riff, which was the I-VII-IV progression played with a shuffle. Bachman says he then handed over the lyrics to Fred Turner with the thought that Turner would sing the lead vocal. But Turner handed them back, saying Randy should sing the lead as it would give himself a needed vocal break when the band performed live.

The original studio version, recorded at Kaye-Smith Studios in Seattle, Washington, features prominent piano, played by Norman Durkee. The reason for Durkee's presence at the studio, and on the track, has been the subject of conflicting information. Randy Bachman has repeatedly stated in interviews that Durkee was delivering pizzas at the time to musicians in the studio, overheard the song being rehearsed, and convinced the band that the song needed a piano part, and that Durkee, who was then an aspiring musician, should be the one to play it. However, both Robbie Bachman and Durkee himself have stated that Durkee was actually at the studio as a musician, recording commercials in the next room, when sound engineer Buzz Richmond asked him to play on "Takin' Care of Business". According to this version of events, Durkee had only a few minutes to spare, and, quickly conferring with Randy Bachman, he scribbled down the chords (on a pizza box), and, without listening to the song beforehand, recorded the piano part in one take.

On May 7, 1994, Randy and a plugged-in stage band led 1300 guitarists to a Guinness World Record. Most guitarists ever gathered that played a song for over an hour by playing "Taking Care of Business" at Robson Square in Vancouver, a record that stands today. In 1980, Kurtis Blow did a cover of Takin' Care of Business on his self-titled debut album, with Mercury Records.

== Reception ==
The song was recorded by Bachman–Turner Overdrive in late 1973 for their second album Bachman–Turner Overdrive II. It reached number 12 on the US Billboard Hot 100 (August 10, 1974), number 6 on the Cash Box Top 100, and number 3 on the Canadian RPM charts, and would become one of BTO's most enduring and well-known songs. "Takin' Care of Business" spent 20 weeks on the Billboard Hot 100, longer than any other BTO single. Cash Box called it "hard rock with a strong blues base," stating that "Randy Bachman's lead vocals are perfect and the group's music is unbeatable." Record World said that "Old 'TCB' expression now comes to mean 'total colossal boogie.'"

In 2011, Bachman said it was the most licensed song in Sony Music's publishing catalogue. It is often referred to as "the provincial rock anthem of Manitoba". Bachman himself used the song as the theme for his syndicated radio music show Vinyl Tap.

=== Elvis and the TCB Band ===
Beginning in 1969, Elvis Presley adopted "Taking Care of Business in a Flash" as a motto, abbreviated as TCB and associated with a lightning bolt. The logo can be seen on his Graceland burial site, one of his airplanes, and is still used in Elvis merchandise.

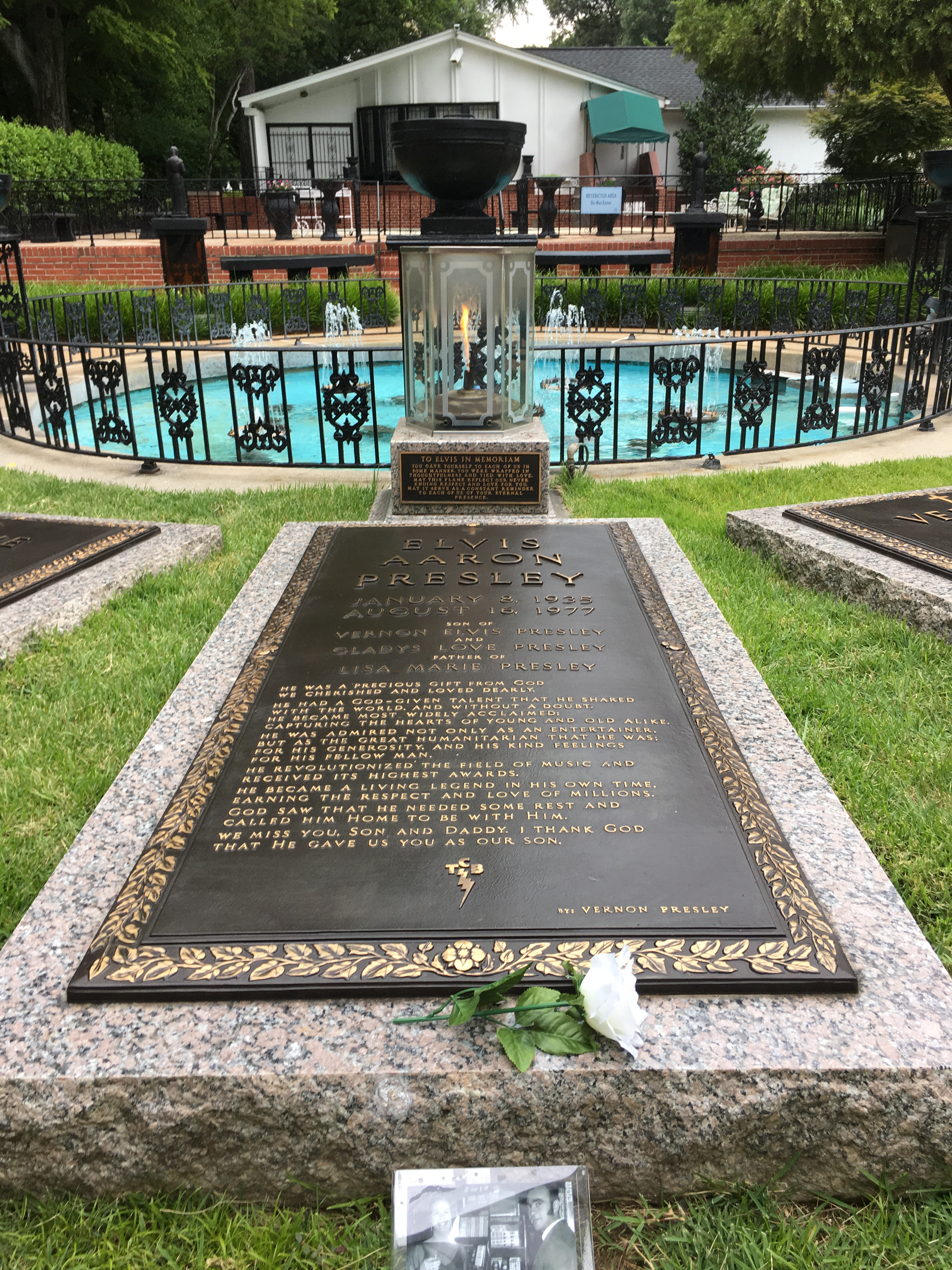
Elvis burial site with TCB logo

His entertainment room at Graceland also shows his dedication to that motto. His last backup group was called the TCB Band, which still plays under the name. Elvis had been a major influence on Bachman. When the song became popular in 1974, Elvis himself became a fan of it, and invited BTO to spend time with him in Las Vegas. In an interview with Larry London of Voice of America, Bachman commented that Elvis had recorded a version of the song but that it would probably never be released.

In 2004, Bachman rewrote the song into a Christmas version titled "Takin' Care of Christmas", which was released on a holiday CD of the same title.

== Track listing ==
1973 single
No.	Title	Length
1.	"Takin' Care Of Business"	4:51
2.	"Stonegates"	5:36
Total length:		10:27

== Personnel ==
- Randy Bachman – lead vocals, lead guitar
- Tim Bachman – guitar, backing vocals
- Fred Turner – bass, backing vocals
- Robbie Bachman – drums, percussion
- Norman Durkee – piano

== Chart performance ==
=== Weekly charts ===
Chart (1974)	Peak position
Australia (Kent Music Report)	14
Canada Top Singles (RPM)	3
US Billboard Hot 100	12

=== Year-end charts ===
Chart (1974)	Rank
Canada	46
US Billboard	63
