= Jah Paul Jo =

American singer-songwriter (1956–2014)

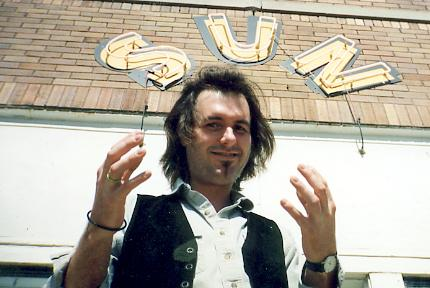

Background information
- Also known as: Severs
- Born: Joseph Jack Ramsey; November 1, 1956; Los Angeles, California, United States
- Origin: Sierra Madre, California
- Died: December 29, 2014 (aged 58) Arcadia, California, United States
- Genres: Rock, reggae
- Occupations: Musician, producer, songwriter, record label owner
- Instruments: Guitar, keyboard, bass
- Years active: 1983–2014
- Labels: Birdcage, Island, IRS, Warner Brothers, JVC (Japan)
- Formerly of: Dread Zeppelin, The Prime Movers, Ron Asheton & The Empty Set
- Website: http://www.dreadzeppelin.tv, http://birdcagerecordsonline.com/about.html, http://primemoversmusic.com

Joseph Jack "Severs" Ramsey, better known by his stage name Jah Paul Jo (November 1, 1956 – December 29, 2014) was an American musician, singer and producer best known for creating the novelty band Dread Zeppelin. From 1983 to 1988, Ramsey was the singer/bass player in The Prime Movers. Ramsey was also the owner of independent record label Birdcage Records, which has released albums by Dread Zeppelin, The Prime Movers, Stan Ridgway, Ron Asheton, In Vivo, The Mystery Band and others.

== The Prime Movers ==
Hailing from Sierra Madre, California, The Prime Movers – Gary Putman on guitar and vocals, Severs Ramsey on vocals and bass and Curt Lichter on drums – formed in 1983, adapting their name from a favorite episode of the science fiction TV series, The Twilight Zone. The band first garnered attention with the mini-LP "Museum" released in 1984 on Jah Paul Jo's indie label, Birdcage Records. Cashbox Magazine wrote in their edition of August 6, 1988, "Gary Putman weaves an ethereal tapestry which blends technical wizardry with pure emotion to create one of the most stylistically unique guitar sounds ever (Did you hear that, Les Paul?)."

While playing the Southern California club circuit, the band landed a major label deal with Island Records. A&R reps saw The Prime Movers at the nightclub Madame Wong's and immediately signed the band to the label.

Island Records UK released two singles and a self-titled EP that found favor with the English record buying public and were critically acclaimed by the British press. A song from the EP, "Strong As I Am," was featured song in the 1986 film Manhunter, and on its soundtrack LP, as well as being released as the A-side of a single on MCA Records. A UK tour with Big Country followed.

== Dread Zeppelin ==
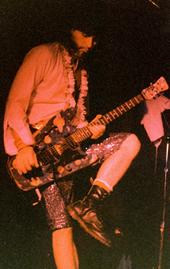
Jo in Action

In 1987, The Prime Movers fell from favor with their label, Island Records, and Ramsey hatched the idea to record new music under an assumed name – the crazier the concept the better. It was at this time Ramsey first used the Jah Paul Jo stage name as an homage to Led Zeppelin bassist John Paul Jones. While recording demos for A&M Records as part of a songwriting publishing deal, Jo, along with Carl Jah, Curt Lichter (Cheese) and Gary Putman recorded two demos, "Memphis of the Mind" and "Earshot" that laid the groundwork for what would soon become Dread Zeppelin.

Ramsey and Putman, as Jah Paul Jo and Put-Mon, recruited some old friends and entered their own, self-induced Musical Witness Protection Program: Dread Zeppelin was born. After selling over a million copies of their classic first album, Un-Led-Ed, success of a different kind consumed them.

Jah Paul Jo, along with Rasta Li-Mon (R. Lee Manning), produced all titles by Dread Zeppelin through JPJo's 1995 finale, No Quarter Pounder. The band released eight CDs between the years 1989 – 1995, toured the world several times, appeared on television shows and portrayed themselves in the motion picture, National Lampoon's Last Resort.

== Birdcage Records ==
After leaving Dread Zeppelin, Jah Paul Jo started assembling his own independent record label roster. The first signing was fellow IRS Record alumnus Stan Ridgway (Wall of Voodoo), who contributed the solo album Black Diamond.

Next was a live/studio release by guitarist Ron Asheton, Thin Slm And None/Flunkie, featuring twelve new originals and a live set of Stooges, Destroy All Monsters and MC5 covers. Jah Paul Jo accompanied the band on their European tour of 1996 that featured guest bassist, Michael Davis of the MC5.

1996 also saw the release of titles by Hecate's Angels (Drywall, Wall of Voodoo), A Thousand Other Names (Shadowfax, Nels Cline), Ed's Too Short (Produced by Jah Paul Jo and Rasta Li-Mon), The Mystery Band featuring members of Captain Beefheart's Magic Band, Ghosthouse (Paisley Underground, Steve Wynn) and others.

== Dread Zeppelin's 20th anniversary ==
January 8, 2009 marked the 20th anniversary of Dread Zeppelin's first gig. To commemorate, Birdcage released Pure Inner-Tainment, the first DVD collection that compiled the best of the original band's video output. Jah Paul Jo launched a new Dread Zeppelin web site, Dread Zeppelin Dot TV, to promote the early band with the accent on their Birdcage releases.

== Later work ==
Jah Paul Jo continued to perform sporadically while still running Birdcage Records. The Prime Movers, with new drummer, Gary Falasco, had a short-lived reunion and re-released their first album, 1984's Museum, for the first time on CD.

== Death ==
Jah Paul Jo died on December 29, 2014, at Methodist Hospital in Arcadia, California, after experiencing numerous health problems in his final years.

== Discography ==
=== Singles ===
- "Chances" / "In Touch With You" – The Prime Movers (1983) 7" vinyl, Birdcage Records
- "On The Trail" / "Strong As I Am" – The Prime Movers (1986) 7" vinyl, Island Records
- "Dark Western Night" / "Lost In Your World" – The Prime Movers (1987) 7" vinyl, Island Records
- "Strong As I Am" – The Prime Movers (Manhunter soundtrack) 7" vinyl MCA (1987)
- "Immigrant Song" / "Hey Hey What Can I Do" – Dread Zeppelin (1989) 7" vinyl, Birdcage Records
- "Whole Lotta Love" / "Tour-Telvis: A Bad Trip" – Dread Zeppelin (1989) 7" vinyl, Birdcage Records

=== Albums ===
- Museum – The Prime Movers (1984) 12" Vinyl, Birdcage Records
- On The Trail/Strong As I Am/Kahlua House/She's Got Pages/The Outsider – The Prime Movers (1986) 12" Vinyl EP, Island Records
- Dark Western Night/Lost in Your World/On The Trail (Live)/In Touch With You (Live) – The Prime Movers (1987) 12" Vinyl EP, Island Records
- Manhunter Original Motion Picture Soundtrack – The Prime Movers (Strong As I Am) 12" Vinyl MCA (1987)
- Spooked – The Prime Movers (1988) 12" Vinyl, Birdcage Records
- Naked Lady Guitar – The Prime Movers (1989) 12" Vinyl, Birdcage Records
- Un-Led-Ed – Dread Zeppelin (1990), I.R.S. Records
- 5,000,000* *Tortelvis Fans Can't Be Wrong – Dread Zeppelin (1991), I.R.S. Records
- Rock'n Roll – Dread Zeppelin (1991) JVC (Japan)
- It's Not Unusual – Dread Zeppelin (1992), I.R.S. Records
- Hot & Spicy Beanburger – Dread Zeppelin (1993), Birdcage Records
- The First No-Elvis – Dread Zeppelin (1994), Birdcage Records
- No Quarter Pounder – Dread Zeppelin (1995), Birdcage Records
- The Song Remains Insane – Dread Zeppelin (1998)
- Museum – The Prime Movers (2005) CD, Birdcage Records
- Pure Inner-Tainment DVD (2009)

=== Production (With Rasta Li-Mon) ===
- Un-Led-Ed – Dread Zeppelin (1990), I.R.S. Records
- 5,000,000* *Tortelvis Fans Can't Be Wrong – Dread Zeppelin (1991), I.R.S. Records
- Rock'n Roll – Dread Zeppelin (1991) JVC (Japan)
- It's Not Unusual – Dread Zeppelin (1992), I.R.S. Records
- Hot & Spicy Beanburger – Dread Zeppelin (1993), Birdcage Records
- The First No-Elvis – Dread Zeppelin (1994), Birdcage Records
- No Quarter Pounder – Dread Zeppelin (1995), Birdcage Records
- Ed's Too Short – Everything's Small (1996), Birdcage Records
- The Song Remains Insane – Dread Zeppelin (1998), TWA Records (Australia)

== Films ==
=== As an actor ===
- National Lampoon's Last Resort (1994)

=== Soundtrack ===
- Manhunter (1987)
- Abraxas: Guardian of the Universe (1990)
- National Lampoon's Last Resort (1994)

== Related artists ==
- Dread Zeppelin
- Stan Ridgway
- Ron Asheton
- The Stooges
- Concrete Blonde
- Captain Beefheart
