= Carl Jah =

American rock musician

- Carl Jah (back row, second from right) as part of the band Dread Zeppelin at the Edwards Drive-In, Arcadia, CA 1989

Background information
- Birth name: Carl John Haasis
- Born: Arcadia, California, U.S.
- Genres: Rock, reggae, heavy metal, hard rock
- Occupations: Musician
- Years active: 1976–present
- Website: carljah.com

Carl Jah (Carl Haasis) is an American rock musician and co-founder of the band Dread Zeppelin. He was the lead guitarist with the band from its founding until 1995, and returned for a period in the 2000s. In 2012, he released his first solo album, Re-Purpose.
