= Led Zeppelin European Tour 1971 =

1971 concert tour by Led Zeppelin

Europe 1971
- Tour by Led Zeppelin
- Poster for Led Zeppelin's infamous concert at Milan, Italy, used to help promote its 1971 European tour
- Location: Denmark; England; Italy; Switzerland
- Associated album: Led Zeppelin IV
- Start date: 3 May 1971
- End date: 8 August 1971
- Legs: 3
- No. of shows: 6

Led Zeppelin concert chronology
- United Kingdom Spring 1971; Europe 1971; North America 1971

Led Zeppelin's 1971 European Tour was a concert tour of Europe by the English rock band. The tour commenced on 3 May and concluded on 5 July 1971. It included one concert at Liverpool, England, which was a rescheduled date from their preceding tour of the United Kingdom. It is possible that other unverified dates in Europe were also performed during this period.

Though being very short in duration, this concert tour was well known, primarily because of the extremely violent crowd disturbance which took place at the band's concert at the Vigorelli Velodrome in Milan on 5 July. This festival appearance in front of an audience of 15,000 people was abandoned when hundreds of tear-gas wielding riot police charged into the crowd. The group were forced to leave the stage and many fans were injured. Some of the group's equipment was also damaged in the chaos. The band's singer Robert Plant later recalled:

We went to Milan and the riot troops moved in and tear-gassed the event. We escaped down an access route and the troops pumped canisters at us as we ran. We managed to get in a dressing room and I barricaded the door with the medicine cabinet and got everybody to put wet towels around their heads. Then they broke the windows and popped a couple of canisters in from the street.

The concert has been described as one of the low points of Led Zeppelin's career, and the band never again returned to Italy.

== Tour set list ==
All track written by Jimmy Page and Robert Plant, except where noted.

The fairly typical set list for the tour was:

1. "Immigrant Song"
2. "Heartbreaker" (Bonham, Jones, Page, Plant)
3. "Since I've Been Loving You" (Page, Plant, Jones)
4. "Out on the Tiles" (intro) (Page, Plant, Bonham) / "Black Dog" (Page, Plant, Jones)
5. "Dazed and Confused" (Page)
6. "Stairway to Heaven"
7. "Going to California"
8. "That's the Way"
9. "Celebration Day" (from 7 Aug)
10. "What Is and What Should Never Be"
11. "Moby Dick" (Bonham, Jones, Page) (on 8 Aug only)
12. "Four Sticks" (on 3 May and 4 May only)
13. "Gallows Pole" (on 3 May and 4 May only)
14. "Whole Lotta Love" (Bonham, Dixon, Jones, Page, Plant)

Encores (variations of the following list):

- "Communication Breakdown" (Bonham, Jones, Page) (on 3 May and 4 May only)
- "Misty Mountain Hop" (Page, Plant, Jones) (on 3 May only)
- "Rock and Roll" (Page, Plant, Jones, Bonham) (on 3 May only)
- "Weekend" (Post) (on 7 August only)

There were some set list substitutions, variations, and order switches during the tour. On 3–4 May Led Zeppelin played "Four Sticks" (Page, Plant), the only known times it was performed by the original band. Also played on 3–4 May was "Gallows Pole," two of only four complete known live performances, the third performance occurring later that year on 19 August 1971 at Pacific Coliseum, Vancouver, Canada, and the fourth on 16 November 1971 at St Matthew's Baths Hall, Ipswich, UK.

== Tour dates ==
Date	City	Country	Venue
Leg 1 – Denmark & England
3 May 1971	Copenhagen	Denmark	K.B. Hallen
4 May 1971	Odense	Denmark	Fyns Forum
10 May 1971	Liverpool	England	University of Liverpool
Leg 2 – Italy
5 July 1971	Milan	Italy	Velodromo Vigorelli
Leg 3 – Switzerland (warm-up shows for following tour)
7 August 1971	Montreux	Switzerland	Montreux Casino
8 August 1971	Montreux	Switzerland	Montreux Casino

== Sources ==
- Lewis, Dave and Pallett, Simon (1997) Led Zeppelin: The Concert File, London: Omnibus Press. ISBN 0-7119-5307-4.
