= Led Zeppelin Japanese Tour 1971 =

1971 concert tour by Led Zeppelin

Japan 1971
- Tour by Led Zeppelin
- Poster for Led Zeppelin's concerts at Tokyo, used to help promote its 1971 Japanese tour
- Associated album: Led Zeppelin IV
- Start date: 23 September 1971
- End date: 29 September 1971
- No. of shows: 5

Led Zeppelin concert chronology
- North America 1971; Japan 1971; United Kingdom Winter 1971

Led Zeppelin's 1971 Japanese Tour was the first in Japan by the English rock band. Commenced on 23 September and concluding on 29 September 1971, it was one of the first tours of Japan by a western rock band.

"It was the first time I'd been to such a sort of overpopulated place…" recalled guitarist Jimmy Page of Tokyo, where the tour began. "It was a city with such a new vision towards the future. The technology boom was really going on, even then… It seems odd now with Nikon everywhere, but at the time they were just really breaking the market, and you could get cameras over here really, really inexpensively, and hi-fi and little cine cameras… We came here and went away loaded with cameras and I started documenting the rest of my travels with Led Zeppelin for a bit."

One of the concerts from the short tour, at Hiroshima on 27 September, was a benefit show. As an expression of thanks, the city of Hiroshima presented the band with a letter of appreciation and the city medal from the local mayor.

During the tour, singer Robert Plant allegedly punched drummer John Bonham before one of the shows. This was not the only turbulent incident, as manager Peter Grant explained:

There were rows. One bloody amazing one happened in Japan when Robert came off stage with a split lip. It was over some dispute over some money from some tour. He still owed Bonzo some petrol money for 70 quid or something, but that's how it was!

The concerts were recorded at the insistence of the Japanese record company Warner Bros.-Pioneer Corporation, which represented the band's record label Atlantic Records in Japan. However, Page considered the audio quality to be so poor, he decided to wipe the tapes and reuse them.

== Set list ==
A typical set list was:

1. "Immigrant Song" (Page, Plant)
2. "Heartbreaker" (Bonham, Page, Plant)
3. "Since I've Been Loving You" (Page, Plant, Jones)
4. "Out on the Tiles" (intro) (Page, Plant, Bonham) / "Black Dog" (Page, Plant, Jones)
5. "Dazed and Confused" (Page)
6. "Stairway to Heaven" (Page, Plant)
7. "Celebration Day" (Jones, Page, Plant)
8. "Bron-Y-Aur Stomp" (Page, Plant, Jones) (Played on 23 and 28 September)
9. "That's the Way" (Page, Plant)
10. "Going to California" (Page, Plant)
11. "Tangerine" (Page)
12. "Friends" (Page, Plant) (Played on 29 September)
13. "What Is and What Should Never Be" (Page, Plant)
14. "Moby Dick" (Page, Jones, Bonham)
15. "Whole Lotta Love" (Bonham, Dixon, Jones, Page, Plant)

Encores (variations of the following list):

- "Thank You" (Page, Plant) (Played on 24 and 29 September)
- "Communication Breakdown" (Bonham, Jones, Page)
- "Rock and Roll" (Page, Plant, Jones, Bonham) (Played on 29 September)

There were some substitutions, variations, and order switches. On 24 September "Your Time Is Gonna Come" was played for the only time in a "Whole Lotta Love" medley that went something like this: "Whole Lotta Love"/"Boogie Chillen"/Cocaine Blues"/"Rave On!"/"Your Time Is Gonna Come"/"I'm A Man"/"The Hunter"/"Hello Mary Lou/"Oh, Pretty Woman"/"How Many More Times"

The only known live performance by Zeppelin of "Friends" on this tour on 29 September 1971 in Osaka, as captured on a number of bootlegs.

== Tour dates ==
Date	City	Country	Venue
23 September 1971	Tokyo	Japan	Nippon Budokan
24 September 1971	Tokyo	Japan	Nippon Budokan
27 September 1971	Hiroshima	Japan	Hiroshima Prefectural Sports Center
28 September 1971	Osaka	Japan	Festival Hall
29 September 1971	Osaka	Japan	Festival Hall

== Sources ==
- Lewis, Dave and Pallett, Simon (1997) Led Zeppelin: The Concert File, London: Omnibus Press. ISBN 0-7119-5307-4.
