= Led Zeppelin North American Tour 1971 =

1971 concert tour by Led Zeppelin

North America 1971
- Tour by Led Zeppelin
- Poster for Led Zeppelin's concert at the Hollywood Sportatorium, used to help promote its 1971 North American tour
- Location: United States; Canada
- Associated album: Led Zeppelin IV
- Start date: 7 August 1971
- End date: 17 September 1971
- No. of shows: 23 (including two European warm-up shows)

Led Zeppelin concert chronology
- Europe 1971; North America 1971; Japan 1971

Led Zeppelin's 1971 North American Tour was the seventh concert tour of North America by the English rock band. The tour commenced on August 7 and concluded on 17 September 1971. It included two warm-up shows in Montreux, Switzerland.

This tour took place just prior to the release of the band's fourth album. The band had hoped to release this album in time for the tour, but various delays prevented this from occurring.

This was the longest break that the band had from touring North America to date, with their last tour there having taken place almost a year previously. During the interim, the hard rock band Grand Funk Railroad had asserted its influence on the American music market, and Led Zeppelin was keen to re-establish their live reputation through this stint of concert performances.

The new material from the fourth album which was presented by the band on stage was very well received by audiences, which helped to ensure massive sales of that album when it was eventually released in November 1971.

The tour is also notable for the high frequency of crowd disturbances which occurred at the concerts, including those at New York City, Toronto and Boston, as the bootlegs of these concerts attest.

Before this tour, Robert Plant shaved off his beard, a style which he and the rest of his bandmates had adopted the year before. John Paul Jones followed suit a month later. However, Jones would later grow a beard in late 1972 and keep it until March 1973, and then have a mustache for part of the 1973 North American Tour, and also have a beard from late 1975 to early 1977.

On this tour, the band grossed $1 million.

== Tour set list ==
The fairly typical set list for the tour was:

1. "Walk Don't Run" (only on 22 August)
2. "Immigrant Song" (Page, Plant)
3. "Heartbreaker" (Bonham, Page, Plant)
4. "Since I've Been Loving You" (Page, Plant, Jones)
5. "Out on the Tiles" (intro) (Page, Plant, Bonham) / "Black Dog" (Page, Plant, Jones)
6. "Dazed and Confused" (Page)
7. "Stairway to Heaven" (Page, Plant)
8. "Celebration Day" (Jones, Page, Plant)
9. "That's the Way" (Page, Plant)
10. "Going to California" (Page, Plant)
11. "What Is and What Should Never Be" (Page, Plant)
12. "Moby Dick" (Page, Jones, Bonham)
13. "Whole Lotta Love" (Bonham, Dixon, Jones, Page, Plant)

Encores (variations of the following list):

- "Communication Breakdown" (Bonham, Jones, Page)
- "Organ Solo" (Jones) / "Thank You" (Page, Plant)
- "Rock and Roll" (Page, Plant, Jones, Bonham) (19 & 21 August and 3, 7 & 13 September)
- "Weekend" (Post) (19 & 21 August)

There were some set list substitutions, variations, and order switches during the tour.

== Tour dates ==
Date	City	Country	Venue
European warm-up shows
7 August 1971	Montreux	Switzerland	Montreux Casino
8 August 1971	Montreux	Switzerland	Montreux Casino
North America
19 August 1971	Vancouver	Canada	Pacific Coliseum
21 August 1971	Inglewood	United States	The Forum
22 August 1971	Inglewood	United States	The Forum
23 August 1971	Fort Worth	United States	Tarrant County Convention Center
24 August 1971	Dallas	United States	Memorial Auditorium
26 August 1971	Houston	United States	Sam Houston Coliseum
27 August 1971	San Antonio	United States	Municipal Auditorium
29 August 1971	New Orleans	United States	Municipal Auditorium
31 August 1971	Orlando	United States	Orlando Sports Stadium
1 September 1971	Pembroke Pines	United States	Hollywood Sportatorium
3 September 1971	New York City	United States	Madison Square Garden
4 September 1971	Toronto	Canada	Maple Leaf Gardens
5 September 1971	Chicago	United States	Chicago Amphitheater
7 September 1971	Boston	United States	Boston Garden
9 September 1971	Hampton	United States	Hampton Coliseum
10 September 1971	Syracuse	United States	Onondaga Veterans Auditorium
11 September 1971	Rochester	United States	War Memorial Auditorium
13 September 1971	Berkeley	United States	Berkeley Community Theatre
14 September 1971	Berkeley	United States	Berkeley Community Theatre
16 September 1971	Honolulu	United States	Neal S. Blaisdell Arena
17 September 1971	Honolulu	United States	Neal S. Blaisdell Arena

== Sources ==
- Lewis, Dave and Pallett, Simon (1997) Led Zeppelin: The Concert File, London: Omnibus Press. ISBN 0-7119-5307-4.
