= Led Zeppelin United Kingdom Tour Spring 1971 =

1971 concert tour by Led Zeppelin

United Kingdom & Ireland Spring 1971
- Tour by Led Zeppelin
- Poster for Led Zeppelin's concert at Southampton University, used to help promote its 1971 "Back to the Clubs" tour
- Location: United Kingdom; Ireland
- Associated album: Led Zeppelin IV
- Start date: 5 March 1971
- End date: 1 April 1971
- Legs: 2
- No. of shows: 13 (14 originally scheduled)

Led Zeppelin concert chronology
- North America Summer 1970; United Kingdom Spring 1971; Europe 1971

Led Zeppelin's Spring 1971 United Kingdom & Ireland Tour (also known as the Back to the Clubs Tour) was a concert tour of the United Kingdom & Ireland by the English rock band. The tour commenced on 5 March and concluded on 1 April 1971.

== Overview ==
For this tour, the band decided to mainly perform at the smaller clubs that they had originally played earlier in their career, rather than large arenas and auditoriums. This decision was made to reward those fans who had been loyal to them from the start of their career. The small, more intimate size of the venues, and the correspondingly smaller ticket sales and gate receipts, was offered as proof that Led Zeppelin wasn't preoccupied with making money and instead endeavoured to create a close connection with their audiences when performing on-stage. However, as the tour progressed, it became evident that this intention was compromised due to thousands of fans being shut out of shows because of the scarce availability of concert tickets.

The Belfast concert on 5 March featured the first public performance of their now-legendary song "Stairway to Heaven", which was played at nearly every subsequent Led Zeppelin show. One scheduled concert from the tour, at Liverpool University, was cancelled and rescheduled to take place during the band's subsequent tour of Europe.

During this period the band members began to experiment with their stage attire, introducing strange caftans and garments and growing longer hair and beards, which gave them a very fashionable appearance.

== Tour set list ==
A fairly typical set list for the tour was:

1. "Immigrant Song" (Page, Plant)
2. "Heartbreaker" (Bonham, Jones, Page, Plant)
3. "Since I've Been Loving You" (Page, Plant, Jones)
4. "Out on the Tiles" (intro) (Page, Plant, Bonham) / "Black Dog" (Page, Plant, Jones)
5. "Dazed and Confused" (Page)
6. "Stairway to Heaven" (Page, Plant)
7. "Going to California" (Page, Plant)
8. "That's the Way" (Page, Plant) (on 1 April only)
9. "What Is and What Should Never Be" (Page, Plant)
10. "Moby Dick" (Page, Jones, Bonham)
11. "Whole Lotta Love" (Bonham, Dixon, Jones, Page, Plant)

Encores (variations of the following list):

- "Organ Solo"/"Thank You" (Page, Plant) (on 21 March and 1 April only)
- "Communication Breakdown" (Bonham, Jones, Page)
- "Rock and Roll" (Page, Plant, Jones, Bonham) (On 5 March and 6 March)
- "Bring It On Home" (Page, Plant, Dixon) (on 5 March only)

There were some set list substitutions, variations, and order switches during the tour.

== Tour dates ==
Date	City	Country	Venue
5 March 1971	Belfast	Northern Ireland	Ulster Hall
6 March 1971	Dublin	Ireland	National Stadium
9 March 1971	Leeds	England	Leeds University
10 March 1971	Canterbury	England	University of Kent
11 March 1971	Southampton	England	Southampton University
13 March 1971	Bath	England	Bath Pavilion
14 March 1971	Stoke-on-Trent	England	Trentham Gardens Ballroom
~~16 March 1971~~	~~Liverpool~~	England	~~Liverpool University~~
18 March 1971	Newcastle upon Tyne	England	Mayfair Ballroom
19 March 1971	Manchester	England	Manchester University
20 March 1971	Birmingham	England	Stepmothers Club
21 March 1971	Nottingham	England	Boat Club
23 March 1971	London	England	The Marquee
1 April 1971	London	England	Paris Theatre (BBC concert)

== Sources ==
- Keith Shadwick, Led Zeppelin : the story of a band and their music, 1968-80. ISBN 0-87930-871-0.
- Lewis, Dave and Pallett, Simon (1997) Led Zeppelin: The Concert File, London: Omnibus Press. ISBN 0-7119-5307-4.
