= Led Zeppelin United Kingdom Tour Winter 1971 =

1971 concert tour by Led Zeppelin

United Kingdom Winter 1971
- Tour by Led Zeppelin
- Poster for Led Zeppelin's concert at the Wembley Empire Pool, used to help promote its Winter 1971 U.K. tour
- Location: England; Scotland
- Associated album: Led Zeppelin IV
- Start date: 11 November 1971
- End date: 21 December 1971
- No. of shows: 16

Led Zeppelin concert chronology
- Japan 1971; United Kingdom Winter 1971; Australasia 1972

Winter 1971 United Kingdom Tour was a concert tour of the United Kingdom by Led Zeppelin. The tour ran from 11 November to 21 December 1971, and "confirmed their supremacy in the UK rock marketplace". Taking place immediately after the release of the band's fourth album, Led Zeppelin IV, all tickets sold out despite going on sale less than a week before the commencement of the tour. Second shows at Wembley and at Manchester were added after fans queued for up to eighteen hours in order to secure a ticket.

This tour is particularly notable for the two concerts performed by the band at the Wembley Empire Pool, Wembley Park, dubbed the "Electric Magic" shows. These five hour shows included bizarre vaudeville circus acts with plate spinners, trapeze artists and performing pigs which were dressed in policeman's uniforms. The concerts also incorporated supporting acts such as Stone the Crows, which was a rare event for Led Zeppelin at this point in their career. A colour poster was sold to fans at the concerts for 30p, which is now a rare and highly sought-after collectible. An altered version of the poster was created for a two coloured silk-screen T-shirt print in 2010 for an official Led Zeppelin T-shirt.

This was the first concert tour on which the band visually projected the "four symbols" which adorned (and is a variant title for) their fourth album onto their stage equipment. Jimmy Page's "Zoso" symbol was put onto one of his Marshall amplifiers, John Bonham's three interlinked circles adorned the outer face of his bass drum, John Paul Jones had his symbol stenciled onto material which was draped across his Fender Rhodes keyboard and Robert Plant's feather symbol was painted onto a side speaker PA cabinet. Plant's feather symbol was the only one not used in subsequent Led Zeppelin concert tours, and Jones' symbol was removed after the Japanese Tour in 1972.

== Tour set list ==
All track written by Jimmy Page and Robert Plant, except where noted.

The fairly typical set list for the tour was:

1. "Immigrant Song"
2. "Heartbreaker" (Bonham, Page, Plant)
3. "Out on the Tiles" (intro) (Page, Plant, Bonham) / "Black Dog" (Page, Plant, Jones)
4. "Since I've Been Loving You" (Page, Plant, Jones)
5. "Rock and Roll" (Page, Plant, Jones, Bonham)
6. "Stairway to Heaven"
7. "Going to California"
8. "That's the Way"
9. "Tangerine" (Page)
10. "Bron-Yr-Aur Stomp" (Page, Plant, Jones)
11. "Dazed and Confused" (Page)
12. "What Is and What Should Never Be"
13. "Celebration Day" (Jones, Page, Plant)
14. "Moby Dick" (Bonham) (on November 13, 20, 21, and 23 only)
15. "Whole Lotta Love" (Bonham, Dixon, Jones, Page, Plant)

Encores (variations of the following list):

- "Communication Breakdown" (Bonham, Jones, Page)
- "Thank You" (On 24 November)
- "Gallows Pole" (on 16 November only)
- "Weekend" (Post) (on 13 and 16 November and 2 December only)
- "It'll Be Me" (on 29 November and 2 December only)

There were some set list substitutions, variations, and order switches during the tour.

== Tour dates ==
Date	City	Country	Venue
11 November 1971	Newcastle upon Tyne	England	Newcastle City Hall
12 November 1971	Sunderland	England	Locarno Ballroom
13 November 1971	Dundee	Scotland	Caird Hall
16 November 1971	Ipswich	England	St. Mathew's Baths
17 November 1971	Birmingham	England	Kinetic Circus
18 November 1971	Sheffield	England	Sheffield University
20 November 1971	London	England	Empire Pool 'Electric Magic' show
21 November 1971	London	England	Empire Pool 'Electric Magic' show
23 November 1971	Preston	England	Preston Public Hall
24 November 1971	Manchester	England	Free Trade Hall
25 November 1971	Leicester	England	Leicester University
29 November 1971	Liverpool	England	Liverpool Stadium
30 November 1971	Manchester	England	Kings Hall, Belle Vue
2 December 1971	Bournemouth	England	Royal Ballroom
9 December 1971	Coventry	England	Lacarno Ballroom
21 December 1971	Salisbury	England	City Hall

== Sources ==
- Lewis, Dave and Pallett, Simon (1997) Led Zeppelin: The Concert File, London: Omnibus Press. ISBN 0-7119-5307-4.
