= Led Zeppelin Remasters =

1990 compilation album by Led Zeppelin

Compilation album by Led Zeppelin
- Released: 15 October 1990
- Recorded: October 1968 – December 1978
- Genres: Hard rock; heavy metal; blues rock; folk rock
- Length: 145:01
- Label: Atlantic
- Producer: Jimmy Page
- Compiler: Jimmy Page

Led Zeppelin chronology
| Led Zeppelin Boxed Set (1990) | Led Zeppelin Remasters (1990) | Led Zeppelin Boxed Set 2 (1993) |

Professional ratings
Review scores
| Source | Rating |
|---|---|
| AllMusic | 3/5 stars |
| The Encyclopedia of Popular Music | 5/5 stars |

Led Zeppelin Remasters is a three-LP (or two-cassette or two-CD) compilation album of digitally remastered material by the English rock band Led Zeppelin. Containing songs from the band's eight studio albums, it was initially released in the UK and Japan by Atlantic Records on 15 October 1990. The album is essentially a smaller version of the four-CD Led Zeppelin Boxed Set, although, unlike the larger collection, it includes "Good Times Bad Times."

== Track listing ==
1990 vinyl edition Side one
| No. | Title | Writer(s) | Length |
|---|---|---|---|
| 1. | "Communication Breakdown" (from Led Zeppelin, 1969) | John Bonham, John Paul Jones, and Jimmy Page | 2:29 |
| 2. | "Babe I'm Gonna Leave You" (from Led Zeppelin) | Bredon, Page, and Robert Plant | 6:42 |
| 3. | "Good Times Bad Times" (from Led Zeppelin) | Bonham, Jones, and Page | 2:45 |
| 4. | "Dazed and Confused" (from Led Zeppelin) | Page (inspired by Jake Holmes) | 6:26 |
| 5. | "Heartbreaker" (from Led Zeppelin II, 1969) | Bonham, Jones, Page, and Plant | 4:14 |

Side two
| No. | Title | Writer(s) | Length |
|---|---|---|---|
| 6. | "Whole Lotta Love" (from Led Zeppelin II) | Bonham, Dixon, Jones, Page and Plant | 5:34 |
| 7. | "Ramble On" (from Led Zeppelin II) | Page and Plant | 4:23 |
| 8. | "Since I've Been Loving You" (from Led Zeppelin III, 1970) | Jones, Page and Plant | 7:24 |
| 9. | "Celebration Day" (from Led Zeppelin III) | Jones, Page and Plant | 3:28 |
| 10. | "Immigrant Song" (from Led Zeppelin III) | Page and Plant | 2:23 |

Side three
| No. | Title | Writer(s) | Length |
|---|---|---|---|
| 11. | "Black Dog" (from Led Zeppelin IV, 1971) | Jones, Page and Plant | 4:54 |
| 12. | "Rock and Roll" (from Led Zeppelin IV) | Bonham, Jones, Page and Plant | 3:40 |
| 13. | "The Battle of Evermore" (from Led Zeppelin IV) | Page and Plant | 5:57 |
| 14. | "Stairway to Heaven" (from Led Zeppelin IV) | Page and Plant | 8:02 |

Side four
| No. | Title | Writer(s) | Length |
|---|---|---|---|
| 15. | "The Song Remains the Same" (from Houses of the Holy, 1973) | Page and Plant | 5:28 |
| 16. | "D'yer Mak'er" (from Houses of the Holy) | Bonham, Jones, Page and Plant | 4:21 |
| 17. | "No Quarter" (from Houses of the Holy) | Jones, Page and Plant | 7:01 |
| 18. | "Houses of the Holy" (from Physical Graffiti, 1975) | Page and Plant | 4:03 |

Side five
| No. | Title | Writer(s) | Length |
|---|---|---|---|
| 19. | "Trampled Under Foot" (from Physical Graffiti) | Jones, Page and Plant | 5:35 |
| 20. | "Kashmir" (from Physical Graffiti) | Bonham, Page and Plant | 8:33 |
| 21. | "Nobody's Fault but Mine" (from Presence, 1976) | Page and Plant | 6:27 |

Side six
| No. | Title | Writer(s) | Length |
|---|---|---|---|
| 22. | "Achilles Last Stand" (from Presence) | Page and Plant | 10:23 |
| 23. | "All My Love" (from In Through the Out Door, 1979) | Jones and Plant | 5:51 |
| 24. | "In the Evening" (from In Through the Out Door) | Jones, Page and Plant | 6:49 |

"Misty Mountain Hop" and "The Rain Song" were not included on the LP edition of the album.

== Personnel ==
Led Zeppelin

- John Bonham – drums, percussion
- John Paul Jones – bass guitar, keyboards, mandolin
- Jimmy Page – acoustic and electric guitars, production, remastering, digital remastering
- Robert Plant – vocals, harmonica

Additional musicians

- Sandy Denny – vocals on "The Battle of Evermore"
- Ian Stewart – piano on "Rock and Roll"

Production

- Yves Beauvais – producer
- Perry Cooper – executive producer
- Bob Defrin – art direction
- Larry Fremantle – design
- Peter Grant – executive producer
- Bob Gruen – photography
- Richard "Hutch" Hutchison – design co-ordinator
- John Kubick – digital editing and transfers
- George Marino – digital remastering
- Jennifer Moore – photography and imaging
- Aubrey Powell – photography
- Jodi Rovin – design
- Rhonda Schoen – digital editing and transfers
- Chris Wroe – photography and imaging

== Chart performance ==
Chart performance for Led Zeppelin Remasters
| Chart (1990) | Peak position |
|---|---|
| Australian ARIA Albums Chart | 1 |
| Austrian Albums Chart | 19 |
| Belgian Albums Chart (Flanders) | 46 |
| Belgian Albums Chart (Wallonia) | 32 |
| Dutch Albums Chart | 33 |
| Finnish Albums Chart | 1 |
| German Albums Chart | 13 |
| Japanese Albums Chart | 32 |
| New Zealand RIANZ Albums Chart | 3 |
| Norwegian Albums Chart | 8 |
| Spanish Albums Chart | 12 |
| Swedish Albums Chart | 21 |
| Swiss Albums Chart | 24 |
| UK Albums Chart | 10 |

== Certifications and sales ==
Certifications for Led Zeppelin Remasters
| Region | Certification | Certified units/sales |
|---|---|---|
| Argentina (CAPIF) | Platinum | 60,000^{^} |
| Australia (ARIA) | 10× Platinum | 730,000 |
| Austria (IFPI Austria) | Gold | 25,000^{*} |
| Brazil (Pro-Música Brasil) | Gold | 100,000^{*} |
| Finland (Musiikkituottajat) | Gold | 35,440 |
| France (SNEP) | Platinum | 300,000^{*} |
| Germany (BVMI) | Platinum | 500,000^{^} |
| Italy (FIMI) | Gold | 25,000^{‡} |
| New Zealand (RMNZ) | 11× Platinum | 165,000^{^} |
| Norway (IFPI Norway) | Gold | 25,000^{*} |
| Spain (Promusicae) | Platinum | 100,000^{^} |
| Switzerland (IFPI Switzerland) | Gold | 25,000^{^} |
| United Kingdom (BPI) | 2× Platinum | 600,000^{^} |
Summaries
| Europe (IFPI) | 3× Platinum | 3,000,000^{*} |
^{*} Sales figures based on certification alone.^{^} Shipments figures based on certification alone.^{‡} Sales+streaming figures based on certification alone.

== Release history ==
Release formats for Led Zeppelin Remasters
| Region | Date | Label | Format | Catalog # |
|---|---|---|---|---|
| United Kingdom | 15 October 1990 | Atlantic | 3LP (33 rpm) | ZEP 1 |
| United Kingdom | 15 October 1990 | Atlantic | 2CD | 80415-2 |

== Led Zeppelin Remasters (Bonus Disc edition) ==
Led Zeppelin Remasters (Bonus Disc edition)

Box set by Led Zeppelin
- Released: 21 February 1992
- Recorded: October 1968 – December 1978
- Genres: Hard rock, heavy metal, blues rock, folk rock
- Length: 205:01
- Label: Atlantic
- Producer: Jimmy Page
- Compiler: Jimmy Page

Led Zeppelin Remasters (Bonus Disc edition) is a three-CD and three-cassette compilation album long-case digipak of remastered material by English rock group Led Zeppelin. The discs came in a multicolour dayglo label reflected on the box set cover. Released in the US by Atlantic Records on 21 February 1992, it includes a bonus CD with promotional interviews with Jimmy Page, Robert Plant and John Paul Jones in a sleeve pouch with liner notes from the original Remasters release.

=== Revised track listing ===
Disc one
| No. | Title | Writer(s) | Length |
|---|---|---|---|
| 1. | "Communication Breakdown" (from Led Zeppelin, 1969) | John Bonham, John Paul Jones, Jimmy Page | 2:29 |
| 2. | "Babe I'm Gonna Leave You" (from Led Zeppelin) | Anne Bredon, Page, and Robert Plant | 6:42 |
| 3. | "Good Times Bad Times" (from Led Zeppelin) | Bonham, Jones, and Page | 2:45 |
| 4. | "Dazed and Confused" (from Led Zeppelin) | Page (inspired by Jake Holmes) | 6:26 |
| 5. | "Whole Lotta Love" (from Led Zeppelin II, 1969) | Bonham, Willie Dixon, Jones, Page, and Plant | 5:34 |
| 6. | "Heartbreaker" (from Led Zeppelin II) | Bonham, Jones, Page, and Plant | 4:14 |
| 7. | "Ramble On" (from Led Zeppelin II) | Page and Plant | 4:23 |
| 8. | "Immigrant Song" (from Led Zeppelin III, 1970) | Page and Plant | 2:23 |
| 9. | "Celebration Day" (from Led Zeppelin III) | Jones, Page, and Plant | 3:28 |
| 10. | "Since I've Been Loving You" (from Led Zeppelin III) | Jones, Page, and Plant | 7:24 |
| 11. | "Black Dog" (from Led Zeppelin IV, 1971) | Jones, Page, and Plant | 4:54 |
| 12. | "Rock and Roll" (from Led Zeppelin IV) | Bonham, Jones, Page, and Plant | 3:40 |
| 13. | "The Battle of Evermore" (from Led Zeppelin IV) | Page and Plant | 5:57 |
| 14. | "Misty Mountain Hop" (from Led Zeppelin IV) | Jones, Page, and Plant | 4:37 |
| 15. | "Stairway to Heaven" (from Led Zeppelin IV) | Page and Plant | 8:02 |

Disc two
| No. | Title | Writer(s) | Length |
|---|---|---|---|
| 1. | "The Song Remains the Same" (from Houses of the Holy, 1973) | Page and Plant | 5:28 |
| 2. | "The Rain Song" (from Houses of the Holy) | Page and Plant | 7:39 |
| 3. | "D'yer Mak'er" (from Houses of the Holy) | Bonham, Jones, Page and Plant | 4:21 |
| 4. | "No Quarter" (from Houses of the Holy) | Jones, Page, and Plant | 7:01 |
| 5. | "Houses of the Holy" (from Physical Graffiti, 1975) | Page and Plant | 4:03 |
| 6. | "Kashmir" (from Physical Graffiti) | Bonham, Page, and Plant | 8:33 |
| 7. | "Trampled Under Foot" (from Physical Graffiti) | Jones, Page, and Plant | 5:35 |
| 8. | "Nobody's Fault but Mine" (from Presence, 1976) | Page and Plant | 6:27 |
| 9. | "Achilles Last Stand" (from Presence) | Page and Plant | 10:23 |
| 10. | "All My Love" (from In Through the Out Door, 1979) | Jones and Plant | 5:51 |
| 11. | "In the Evening" (from In Through the Out Door) | Jones, Page, and Plant | 6:49 |

Disc three
Profiled

- 1) Led Zeppelin Profile
- 2–8) Jimmy Page Station Liners
- 9–20) Jimmy Page interview
- 21–32) Robert Plant interview
- 33–43) John Paul Jones interview

Disc three was originally issued under the title Profiled, as a promotional accompaniment to the Led Zeppelin Boxed Set.

=== Personnel ===
Led Zeppelin

- John Bonham – drums
- John Paul Jones – bass guitar, keyboards, mandolin
- Jimmy Page – guitars, production
- Robert Plant – vocals, harmonica, tambourine

Additional musicians

- Sandy Denny – vocals on "The Battle of Evermore"
- Ian Stewart – piano on "Rock and Roll"

=== Chart performance ===
Chart performance for Led Zeppelin Remasters (bonus disc)
| Chart (1999) | Peak position |
|---|---|
| US Billboard 200 | 47 |

=== Certification ===
Certifications for Led Zeppelin Remasters (bonus disc)
| Region | Certification | Certified units/sales |
|---|---|---|
| United States (RIAA) | 2× Platinum | 1,000,000^{^} |
^{^} Shipments figures based on certification alone.

=== Release history ===
Release formats for Led Zeppelin Remasters (bonus disc)
| Region | Date | Label | Format | Catalog # |
|---|---|---|---|---|
| United States | 21 February 1992 | Atlantic | 3CD | 82371-2 |

== See also ==
- List of best-selling albums in Australia
