= How the West Was Won (Led Zeppelin album) =

Live album by Led Zeppelin
- Released: 27 May 2003
- Recorded: 25 and 27 June 1972; 22 January 1973
- Venue: L.A. Forum (25 June); Long Beach Arena (27 June); Southampton University (22 Jan)
- Genre: Hard rock; heavy metal; blues rock; folk rock
- Length: 150:27
- Label: Atlantic
- Producer: Jimmy Page
- Compiler: Jimmy Page

Led Zeppelin chronology
Led Zeppelin DVD (2003)	How the West Was Won (2003)	Mothership (2007)

Led Zeppelin live chronology
The Song Remains the Same (1976)	How the West Was Won (2003)	Celebration Day (2012)

How the West Was Won is a live triple album by the English rock group Led Zeppelin, released by Atlantic Records on compact disc on 27 May 2003, DVD-Audio on 7 October 2003 and Blu-ray audio in 2018. The recordings are taken from two 1972 performances in California during their tour of North America: L.A. Forum (25 June 1972) and Long Beach Arena (27 June 1972).

== Background ==
Guitarist Jimmy Page considers Led Zeppelin at this point to have been at their artistic peak, as is mentioned in the album's liner notes and in an interview he gave to The Times newspaper in 2010.

For many years, recordings of these two shows circulated only in the form of bootlegs, such as Burn Like a Candle. Though soundboard recordings of Led Zeppelin concerts were circulated among fans after being stolen from Page's personal archive in the mid-1980s, no such versions of the 1972 Long Beach or LA Forum shows were taken, meaning How the West Was Won was the first chance fans had of hearing the soundboard versions of these concerts. The songs from the two shows underwent extensive editing and audio engineering by Kevin Shirley and Page at SARM West Studios in London before being released on the album.

"It wasn't in our thoughts to try and outdo The Song Remains the Same…" remarked engineer Kevin Shirley. "The reason those performances still stand up now is because Jimmy really was a genius. He could create tempests, summon storms. He really was the master of light and shade. And the musicians around him allowed him to flesh out that vision. Especially John Bonham, without whom Jimmy and Zeppelin would never have been able to do what he did."

The album was remastered and reissued on 23 March 2018 in many formats, including 3CD, 4LP, Blu-Ray Audio and a Super Deluxe Edition box set.

== Reception ==
Professional ratings
Aggregate scores
Source	Rating
Metacritic	97/100
Review scores
Source	Rating
AllMusic	4.5/5 stars
Dotmusic	10/10
E!	A
The Encyclopedia of Popular Music	4/5 stars
Entertainment Weekly	A−
Pitchfork	8.8/10
Q	5/5 stars
Rolling Stone	4/5 stars
Stylus	A−
Uncut	4/5 stars

The album debuted on the Billboard 200 chart for the week ending 14 June 2003 at number 1, with sales of 154,000 copies. It remained on the chart for 16 weeks. It was certified gold and platinum by the RIAA on 30 June 2003. How the West Was Won received an overall score of 97 by review site Metacritic.

Accolades for How the West Was Won
Publication	Country	Accolade	Year	Rank
Classic Rock	UK	"The 50 Greatest Live Albums Ever"	2003	4
Les Inrockuptibles	France	"2003 Best Reissues"	2003	4
Record Collector	UK	"New Albums: Readers Top 10" (2003)	2004	4
The Village Voice	US	"Albums of the Year"	2004	37
Q	UK	"10 Live Albums You Must Own"	2005	*
Q	UK	"The 20 Greatest Live Albums"	2006	11
Rock Hard	Germany	"The 500 Greatest Rock & Metal Albums of All Time	2005	342
Rolling Stone	USA	"The 50 Greatest Live Albums of All Time	2015	23
Guitar World	USA	"The 10 Best Live Albums You Must Hear	2019	7
Planet Rock magazine	UK	"The 100 Greatest Live Albums Ever"	2020	*

(*) designates unordered lists.

== Track listing ==
Disc one
No.	Title	Writer(s)	Recording date and venue	Length
1.	"LA Drone"	John Paul Jones, Jimmy Page	27 June, Long Beach Arena	0:14
2.	"Immigrant Song" (from Led Zeppelin III)	Page, Robert Plant	Mixed from both nights	3:42
3.	"Heartbreaker" (from Led Zeppelin II)	John Bonham, Jones, Page, Plant	Mixed from both nights	7:25
4.	"Black Dog" (from Led Zeppelin IV)	Jones, Page, Plant	Mixed from both nights	5:41
5.	"Over the Hills and Far Away" (from Houses of the Holy)	Page, Plant	Mixed from both nights	5:08
6.	"Since I've Been Loving You" (from Led Zeppelin III)	Jones, Page, Plant	27 June	8:02
7.	"Stairway to Heaven" (from Led Zeppelin IV)	Page, Plant	Mixed from both nights; Mellotron from Southampton University, Southampton, England, 22 January 1973	9:38
8.	"Going to California" (from Led Zeppelin IV)	Page, Plant	27 June	5:37
9.	"That's the Way" (from Led Zeppelin III)	Page, Plant	25 June, LA Forum	5:54
10.	"Bron-Y-Aur Stomp" (from Led Zeppelin III)	Jones, Page, Plant	27 June	4:55

Disc two
No.	Title	Writer(s)	Recording date and venue	Length
1.	"Dazed and Confused" (from Led Zeppelin) "Walter's Walk" (from Coda) "The Crunge" (from Houses of the Holy)	Page (inspired by Jake Holmes); Page, Plant; Bonham, Jones, Page, Plant	25 June	25:25
2.	"What Is and What Should Never Be" (from Led Zeppelin II)	Page, Plant	27 June	4:41
3.	"Dancing Days" (from Houses of the Holy)	Page, Plant	Mixed from both nights	3:42
4.	"Moby Dick" (from Led Zeppelin II)	Bonham, Jones, Page	25 June	19:20

Disc three
No.	Title	Writer(s)	Recording date and venue	Length
1.	"Whole Lotta Love" (from Led Zeppelin II) "Boogie Chillun" "Let's Have a Party" "Hello Mary Lou" (omitted from 2018 reissue) "Going Down Slow"	Bonham, Willie Dixon, Jones, Page, Plant; Bernie Besman, John Lee Hooker; Jessie Mae Robinson; Cayet Mangiaracina, Gene Pitney; James B. Oden	25 June	23:07
2.	"Rock and Roll" (from Led Zeppelin IV)	Bonham, Jones, Page, Plant	27 June	3:56
3.	"The Ocean" (from Houses of the Holy)	Bonham, Jones, Page, Plant	25 June	4:21
4.	"Bring It On Home" "Bring It On Back" (from Led Zeppelin II)	Dixon; Bonham, Jones, Page, Plant	25 June	9:30
Total length:				150:27

Notes:

- The DVD-Audio version of the album has tracks 1–11 on disc one with tracks 12–18 on disc two. It features the whole album in 24bit/48 kHz for both 5.1 and Stereo.
- The Blu-Ray Audio version of the albums has all tracks on one disc. It features the whole album in 24-bit/96 kHz DTS-Master Audio 5.1, as well as two stereo tracks (PCM and DTS-MA)
- The 4 LP version of the album has tracks 1–4 on Side A, tracks 5, 12 & 13 on Side B, track 6 & 7 on Side C, track 8–10 on Side D, tracks 11, 14 & 15 on Sides E, F & G respectively, and tracks 16–18 on Side H
- The medley omitting "Hello Mary Lou" has a runtime of 20:59 in the 2018 reissue

== Personnel ==
Led Zeppelin

- Robert Plant – vocals, harmonica
- Jimmy Page – guitars, mandolin
- John Paul Jones – bass guitar, double bass, bass pedals, keyboards, mandolin, backing vocals
- John Bonham – drums, percussion, backing vocals, co-lead vocals on "Bron-Yr-Aur Stomp"

Additional personnel

- Jim Cummins – photography
- James Fortune – photography
- Drew Griffiths – sound assistant
- Ross Halfin – package creative consultant
- Eddie Kramer – engineering
- Phil Lemon – design, artwork
- Jeffrey Mayer – photography
- Michael Putland – photography
- Kevin Shirley – engineering, mixing
- John Davis – mastering (2018 reissue)

== Charts ==
=== Weekly charts ===
Sales chart performance for How the West Was Won
Chart (2003)	Peak position
Australian Albums (ARIA)	10
Austrian Albums (Ö3 Austria)	17
Belgian Albums (Ultratop Flanders)	9
Belgian Albums (Ultratop Wallonia)	2
Canadian Albums (Billboard)	1
Danish Albums (Hitlisten)	25
Dutch Albums (Album Top 100)	47
Finnish Albums (Suomen virallinen lista)	23
French Albums (SNEP)	11
German Albums (Offizielle Top 100)	11
Irish Albums (IRMA)	9
Italian Albums (FIMI)	7
Japanese Albums Chart	3
New Zealand Albums (RMNZ)	13
Norwegian Albums (VG-lista)	10
Portuguese Albums (AFP)	9
Scottish Albums (OCC)	5
Spanish Albums (Promusicae)	55
Swedish Albums (Sverigetopplistan)	16
Swiss Albums (Schweizer Hitparade)	20
UK Albums (OCC)	5
US Billboard 200	1

Sales chart performance for How the West Was Won
Chart (2018)	Peak position
Hungarian Albums (MAHASZ)	10

=== Year-end charts ===
2003 Year-end chart performance for How the West Was Won
Chart (2003)	Position
Belgian Albums (Ultratop Wallonia)	51
UK Albums (OCC)	136
US Billboard 200	140

== Certifications ==
Certifications for How the West Was Won
Region	Certification	Certified units/sales
Brazil (Pro-Música Brasil)	Gold	50,000^{*}
Canada (Music Canada)	Platinum	100,000^{^}
United Kingdom (BPI)	Gold	100,000^{^}
United States (RIAA)	Platinum	500,000^{^}
^{*} Sales figures based on certification alone.^{^} Shipments figures based on certification alone.

== Release history ==
Release formats for How the West Was Won
Region	Date	Label	Format	Catalog #
United States	27 May 2003	Atlantic Records	Compact Disc (×3)	83587-2
United States	7 October 2003	Atlantic Records	DVD-Audio (×2)	83587-9
Japan	27 May 2003	WEA Japan	Compact Disc (×3)	11585-7
Worldwide	23 March 2018	Warner	Blu-ray (×1)	
Worldwide	23 March 2018	Warner	Vinyl (×4)	
