= The Song Remains the Same (album) =

1976 live album / soundtrack album by Led Zeppelin

Live album / Soundtrack album by Led Zeppelin
- Released: 22 October 1976
- Recorded: 27–29 July 1973
- Venues: Madison Square Garden, New York City
- Genre: Hard rock
- Length: 99:45 (1976 release); 131:55 (2007 reissue)
- Label: Swan Song
- Producer: Jimmy Page

Led Zeppelin chronology
Presence (1976)	The Song Remains the Same (1976)	In Through the Out Door (1979)

Led Zeppelin live chronology
The Song Remains the Same (1976)	How the West Was Won (2003)

The Song Remains the Same is the live soundtrack album of the concert film of the same name by the English rock band Led Zeppelin. The soundtrack was recorded 27–29 July 1973 and released on 22 October 1976 on Swan Song Records.

== Overview ==
The recording of the album and the film took place during three nights of concerts at New York's Madison Square Garden, during the band's 1973 North American tour. All songs were recorded by Eddie Kramer using the Wally Heider Mobile Studio truck, and later mixed at Electric Lady Studios in New York and Trident Studios in London.

The sleeve design depicts a dilapidated movie house on Old Street film studios in London, where the group rehearsed for their 1973 tour.

Until the album and the film were remastered and re-released in 2007, they featured slightly different track lists:

- The soundtrack album included "Celebration Day", which did not appear in the film. The album did not include several songs featured in the film, including "Black Dog", "Since I've Been Loving You", "Heartbreaker", the instrumental "Bron-Yr-Aur" (which appeared on Physical Graffiti), and a hurdy-gurdy piece called "Autumn Lake".

In addition, some of the recordings featured on the album were of different performances from those in the film.

Some tracks recorded at Madison Square Garden were omitted from both the film and the soundtrack album: "Over the Hills and Far Away", "Misty Mountain Hop", "The Ocean", and "Thank You".

== 2007 reissue ==
The surviving band members oversaw the remixing and remastering of the original release, and The Song Remains the Same soundtrack album was reissued on CD on 20 November 2007. This coincided with the re-issue of the film, released on HD-DVD, Blu-ray and DVD. The new version of the soundtrack included six songs that were not on the original album release: "Black Dog", "Over the Hills and Far Away", "Misty Mountain Hop", "Since I've Been Loving You", "The Ocean" and "Heartbreaker", plus new liner notes by Cameron Crowe.

With the 2007 re-release of both the album and film, the songs were synchronised so that the full set-list from the concerts was available on both, with each song mixed the same way. Kevin Shirley, who worked on How the West Was Won, was involved in the mixing.

Due to legal complications, the band decided not to change the video portion of the original movie for the re-release. Instead, Shirley created an entirely new mix of the three 1973 Madison Square Garden concerts so that the audio portion of the film would better match the on-screen visuals. The audio on the new CD release was nearly identical to the soundtrack of the new DVD release. One difference was that the songs included on the CDs that were not featured in the original movie were included as bonus tracks on the DVD.

The audio mixes also differed from those found on the 2003 Led Zeppelin DVD. The most obvious example is that "Black Dog" was two minutes longer on the 2003 DVD than on the 2007 releases, two of the four verses being cut from the song.

On 29 July 2008, a four-LP edition of the 2007 re-issue, on 180 gram audiophile vinyl, was released. It was presented in a deluxe archival two-piece box with foil-stamping. It includes a 12-page oversized full-colour booklet with dozens of previously unpublished stills from the film, as well as four individual jackets with new and unique artwork. A special white vinyl edition was also printed in very limited numbers. Just 200 were produced, with only 100 being made available to the public from Led Zeppelin's official website.

== 2018 reissue ==
On 7 September 2018, a newly remastered edition of The Song Remains the Same was issued in multiple formats, including a multi-disc, super deluxe boxed set, Blu-ray audio with a hi-resolution stereo and new 5.1 surround mix, 180-gram vinyl, CD, streaming and downloads, including 24-bit/96k hi-res audio files for the first time. This is based on the 2007 version of the soundtrack album and concludes the campaign of reissues of their live albums and deluxe editions of their studio albums that started in 2014.

== Critical reception ==
Professional ratings
Review scores
Source	Rating
AllMusic	3/5 stars
Blender	3/5 stars
Robert Christgau	C+
The Daily Telegraph	3/5 stars
The Encyclopedia of Popular Music	2/5 stars
Mojo (2007 reissue)	4/5 stars
MusicHound	2/5
Q	2/5 stars
Record Collector (2007 reissue)	4/5 stars
The Rolling Stone Album Guide	2/5 stars
Uncut (2007 reissue)	4/5 stars

Upon its initial release in 1976, the album received some mixed reviews, with a number of critics considering it to be over-produced and lumbering. Indeed, the band's members themselves have since expressed a lack of fondness for the recording. Page has admitted that the end product was not the best representation of Led Zeppelin as a live band.

In contrast, the 2007 reissued version received generally much more positive reviews. In a review published in Mojo magazine in December 2007 James McNair gave the album four out of five stars, as did David Cavanagh in Uncut magazine, who wrote:

The sound is vastly improved, as is the playing of the musicians (due to digital re-editing of the three MSG concerts, presumably). Not so much remastered as reconstructed, the 15 tracks (six previously unreleased) showboat, strut and snarl.

== Track listing ==
=== Original release ===
Side one
No.	Title	Writer(s)	Length
1.	"Rock and Roll"	John Bonham; John Paul Jones; Jimmy Page; Robert Plant	4:03
2.	"Celebration Day"	Jones; Page; Plant	3:43
3.	"The Song Remains the Same"	Page; Plant	6:00
4.	"The Rain Song"	Page; Plant	8:24

Side two
No.	Title	Writer(s)	Length
1.	"Dazed and Confused"	Page - inspired by Jake Holmes	26:53

Side three
No.	Title	Writer(s)	Length
1.	"No Quarter"	Jones; Page; Plant	12:30
2.	"Stairway to Heaven"	Page; Plant	10:58

Side four
No.	Title	Writer(s)	Length
1.	"Moby Dick"	Bonham; Jones; Page	12:47
2.	"Whole Lotta Love"	Bonham; Jones; Page; Plant; Willie Dixon	14:24
Total length:			99:42

=== 2007 reissue ===
Disc one
No.	Title	Writer(s)	Length
1.	"Rock and Roll"	Bonham; Jones; Page; Plant	3:56
2.	"Celebration Day"	Jones; Page; Plant	3:37
3.	"Black Dog*"	Jones; Page; Plant	3:46
4.	"Over the Hills and Far Away*"	Page; Plant	6:11
5.	"Misty Mountain Hop*"	Jones; Page; Plant	4:43
6.	"Since I've Been Loving You*"	Jones; Page; Plant	8:23
7.	"No Quarter#"	Jones; Page; Plant	10:38
8.	"The Song Remains the Same"	Page; Plant	5:39
9.	"The Rain Song"	Page; Plant	8:20
10.	"The Ocean*"	Bonham; Jones; Page; Plant	5:13

- Track 3 features "Bring It On Home" intro

Disc two
No.	Title	Writer(s)	Length
1.	"Dazed and Confused+"	Page - inspired by Jake Holmes	29:18
2.	"Stairway to Heaven"	Page; Plant	10:53
3.	"Moby Dick#"	Bonham; Jones; Page	11:02
4.	"Heartbreaker*"	Bonham; Jones; Page; Plant	6:19
5.	"Whole Lotta Love#"	Bonham; Jones; Page; Plant; Dixon	13:51
Total length:			131:55

Notes

- (*) Not on original soundtrack release
- (#) Shorter than the original soundtrack release
- (+) Longer than the original soundtrack release

== Personnel ==
Led Zeppelin

- Robert Plant – vocals
- Jimmy Page – guitars, Theremin
- John Paul Jones – bass guitar, Fender Rhodes, Mellotron
- John Bonham – drums, percussion, backing vocals

Production

- Barry Diament – mastering (original Compact Disc release)
- Peter Grant – executive producer
- Eddie Kramer – engineering, mixing
- Bob Ludwig – remastering (2007 edition)
- Jimmy Page – production
- Kevin Shirley – remixing (2007 edition)

Packaging

- Cameron Crowe – liner notes
- George Hardie – record sleeve
- Hipgnosis – record sleeve

== Charts ==
=== Weekly charts ===
1976–1977 weekly chart performance for The Song Remains the Same
Chart (1976–1977)	Peak position
Australian Albums (Kent Music Report)	8
Canada Top Albums/CDs (RPM)	8
Dutch Albums (Album Top 100)	19
Finnish Albums (The Official Finnish Charts)	23
German Albums (Offizielle Top 100)	16
Italian Albums (Musica e Dischi)	13
Japanese Albums (Oricon)	6
New Zealand Albums (RMNZ)	6
Norwegian Albums (VG-lista)	21
Spanish Albums Chart	26
Swedish Albums (Sverigetopplistan)	29
UK Albums (Official Charts)	1
US Billboard 200	2

2007 weekly chart performance for The Song Remains the Same
Chart (2007)	Peak position
US Billboard Top Digital Albums Chart	24
US Billboard Top Internet Albums Chart	18
US Top Hard Rock Albums (Billboard)	11
US Indie Store Album Sales (Billboard)	11

2018 weekly chart performance for The Song Remains the Same
Chart (2018)	Peak position
Austrian Albums (Ö3 Austria)	37
Belgian Albums (Ultratop Flanders)	41
Belgian Albums (Ultratop Wallonia)	37
Finnish Albums (Suomen virallinen lista)	50
Italian Albums (FIMI)	62
Portuguese Albums (AFP)	23
Scottish Albums (Official Charts)	15
Spanish Albums (Promusicae)	39
Swiss Albums (Schweizer Hitparade)	55
UK Rock & Metal Albums (Official Charts)	3

=== Year-end charts ===
Year-end chart performance for The Song Remains the Same
Chart (1976)	Position
Canada Top Albums/CDs (RPM)	65
Chart (1977)	Position
US Billboard 200	59

== Certifications ==
Certifications for The Song Remains the Same
Region	Certification	Certified units/sales
France (SNEP)	Gold	100,000^{*}
Germany (BVMI)	Gold	250,000^{^}
New Zealand (RMNZ)	3× Platinum	45,000^{^}
United Kingdom (BPI)	Platinum	300,000^{^}
United States (RIAA)	4× Platinum	2,000,000^{^}
^{*} Sales figures based on certification alone.^{^} Shipments figures based on certification alone.
