= Friends (Led Zeppelin song) =

Song by Led Zeppelin

from the album Led Zeppelin III
- Released: 5 October 1970
- Recorded: May–June 1970 (?); 3 June, 5 June 1970
- Studio: Rolling Stones Mobile Studio, Headley Grange, Hampshire; Olympic Sound Studios, Barnes, London (Studio One)
- Genre: Psychedelia
- Length: 3:55
- Label: Atlantic
- Songwriters: Jimmy Page; Robert Plant
- Producer: Jimmy Page

"Friends" is a song by English rock band Led Zeppelin. It was written by Jimmy Page and Robert Plant in 1970 at Bron-Yr-Aur, a small cottage in Wales where they stayed after completing a concert tour of the United States. The song was released on Led Zeppelin III (1970), where it appears as the second track. Biographer Stephen Davis called the piece "Jimmy's [Page's] last stab at psychedelia".

== Composition and recording ==
Plant has acknowledged the influence of the Indian and Caribbean music he first heard during his childhood in the Black Country on "Friends": "There's something really splendid and otherworldly about trying to even touch those bigger ideas as a British rock group, to go past singing about bars and chicks and all that crap. There are other dynamics of life and we started to recognise that here."

Page uses an open-C6 chord (C-A-C-G-C-E) guitar tuning for the song, which he also used for "Bron-Yr-Aur" and "Poor Tom" (recorded during the same sessions). He also used an Altair Tube Limiter to enhance the acoustic quality of his Harmony guitar, a device recommended to him by acoustic guitarist Dick Rosmini. This same device was later used by Page on "All My Love", which was included on Led Zeppelin's In Through the Out Door album.

"Friends" is one of the few Led Zeppelin songs that includes strings. Bass player John Paul Jones contributed the string arrangement, but received no writing credit for this song.

== Performances ==
The only known live performance of the song by Led Zeppelin was on 29 September 1971 in Osaka, during the band's Japanese concert tour.

The song was re-recorded by Page and Plant with the Bombay Symphony Orchestra in 1972, during their trip to India, along with another track, "Four Sticks" from Led Zeppelin IV. This version featured tabla drums and sitars. The recordings were released officially on the 2015 remastering of Coda.

"Friends" was also recorded by Page and Plant for their 1994 release No Quarter: Jimmy Page and Robert Plant Unledded, accompanied by a Middle-Eastern orchestra.

"Friends" was used by Robert Plant as the closing track in the setlist of his 2024 tour with The Saving Grace and Suzi Dian.

== Reception ==
In a contemporary review of Led Zeppelin III, Lester Bangs of Rolling Stone gave "Friends" a mixed review, writing that while the track "has a fine bitter acoustic lead", it "gives itself over almost entirely to monotonously shrill Plant breast-beatings."

In a retrospective review of Led Zeppelin III (Deluxe Edition), Kristofer Lenz of Consequence of Sound stated while listening to Led Zeppelin III, "Friends" is like a "re-calibration" from the face-melting "Immigrant Song" to a more "woozy, loose tuning" track, with tabla by John Bonham. When discussing the bonus tracks of the Deluxe Edition, Lenz praising the new version of "Friends" (an instrumental version), writing it "allows the listener to focus in on the unique arrangement of guitar, strings, and percussion."

== Personnel ==
According to Jean-Michel Guesdon and Philippe Margotin:

- Robert Plant – vocals
- Jimmy Page – acoustic guitars, Moog synthesizer
- John Paul Jones – bass, string arrangements, Moog synthesizer
- John Bonham – congas

== Bibliography ==
- Guesdon, Jean-Michel; Margotin, Philippe (2018). Led Zeppelin All the Songs: The Story Behind Every Track. Running Press. ISBN 978-0-316-448-67-3.
- Davis, Stephen (1985). Hammer of the Gods. New York City: Ballantine Books. ISBN 0-345-33516-3.
- Lewis, Dave (2010). Led Zeppelin: The Complete Guide To Their Music. London: Omnibus Press. ISBN 978-0857121356.
- Welch, Chris (1998). Led Zeppelin: Dazed and Confused: The Stories Behind Every Song. New York City: Thunder's Mouth Press. ISBN 1-56025-818-7.
