= Richard Cole =

English rock music manager (1946–2021)

- Born: 2 January 1946; Kensal Rise, London, England
- Died: 2 December 2021 (aged 75)
- Occupations: Tour manager, music manager
- Years active: 1964–2021
- Formerly of: Led Zeppelin, The Yardbirds, Vanilla Fudge, The New Vaudeville Band, Unit 4 + 2, Fem 2 Fem, Crazy Town, Fu Manchu, Eric Clapton, Black Sabbath, The Gipsy Kings, The Searchers, Young Rascals, Lita Ford, Three Dog Night, London Quireboys, The Who, Ozzy Osbourne, The Throbs
- Website: www.ledzeppelin.com

Richard Cole (2 January 1946 – 2 December 2021) was an English music manager, who was involved in the rock music business from the mid-1960s to 2003. He is most known for having been the tour manager of English rock band Led Zeppelin from 1968 to 1980.

== Early career ==
Cole was born in Kensal Rise, in the north London borough of Brent. His father was an architect who worked for Rolls-Royce vehicle design, and later in aircraft assembly during World War II. At the age of 12, Cole became interested in music after hearing Elvis Presley and The Everly Brothers. He left school aged 15, and from his first job, working at a dairy factory in Acton, earned enough money to purchase a drumkit, on which he practiced along with Buddy Rich and Gene Krupa records. The low wages forced Cole to take up an apprenticeship in sheet-metal working whilst also working as a scaffolder on construction sites. He was also very interested in the fashion industry, at one point harbouring plans to be a fashion designer, and he claimed to have designed the shirts worn by John Lennon and Ringo Starr on the Revolver album cover, and to have contributed to the album's graphics.

Cole was drawn into the music business after meeting Richard Green, journalist for the Record Mirror, at the Marquee Club in 1965. Green suggested that Cole contact John Barker, the manager of pop band Unit 4 + 2, for a job as their road manager. Barker gave Cole the job, and he soon became one of rock's most respected tour managers, working for The Who in 1965 and The New Vaudeville Band in 1966. In 1967 Cole moved to the United States and worked for Vanilla Fudge as a sound engineer. When he heard that The Yardbirds were coming to the US in 1968, he contacted their manager Peter Grant, whom he had previously known when Grant was the manager of the New Vaudeville Band, and became their tour manager. When The Yardbirds dissolved shortly thereafter, Grant and Cole became the manager and tour manager respectively of Led Zeppelin.

== Led Zeppelin ==
Cole was one of the first tour managers to specialise in the American tours of English bands. Instead of hiring equipment in the United States and using an American crew to service the band, as was the custom until that point, Cole implemented the new practice of bringing over all the equipment and an entirely English crew. Cole claimed "I fucking reorganized that very sharply. I said 'Fuck that. Let's take our own equipment over there, wot we're used to working on'." This practice subsequently became commonplace for other bands touring the US.

On 23 December 1968, Cole booked Led Zeppelin into the Chateau Marmont on the Sunset Strip in Los Angeles and later at the nearby Continental Hyatt House, also known as "The Riot House". Cole was also responsible for introducing groupies, some of whom he had known on previous tours with The Yardbirds and The Who, to members of the band.

Cole was responsible for collecting box office takings and keeping receipts on behalf of the band for Led Zeppelin concert tours. During Led Zeppelin's final show at Madison Square Garden in New York in July 1973 during their 1973 North American tour, more than US$203,000 disappeared from a safe deposit box at the Drake Hotel. The police at first suspected Cole as being responsible for the theft. Cole was entrusted with the key to the safe deposit box at the time of the theft and he was the first person at the scene to discover that the money was unaccounted for. He took a lie detector test and was cleared of any involvement. The money was never recovered, and neither Cole nor anyone associated with Led Zeppelin was ever charged. The Drake Hotel was later sued over the incident.

In 1977, manager Peter Grant gave his approval for Cole to hire John Bindon to act as security co-ordinator for the band's concert tour of the United States. Bindon had previously provided security for actors Ryan and Tatum O'Neal. Towards the end of the tour, a major incident occurred during a concert at the Oakland Coliseum on 23 July 1977. Upon arrival at the stadium, it was alleged that Bindon pushed a member of promoter Bill Graham's stage crew out of the way as the band entered via a backstage ramp. Tension had been simmering between Graham's staff and Led Zeppelin's security team during the day, and as Grant and Bindon were walking down the ramp near the end of the concert, words were exchanged with stage crew chief Jim Downey, which resulted in Bindon knocking Downey out cold.

Within minutes a separate off-stage incident, involving Graham's security man Jim Matzorkis (who was accused of slapping Peter Grant's 11-year-old son Warren over the removal of a dressing room sign), escalated into an all-out brawl in which Matzorkis was brutally beaten. Led Zeppelin's second Oakland show took place only after Bill Graham signed a letter of indemnification, absolving Led Zeppelin from responsibility for the previous night's incident. However, Graham refused to honour the letter, and assault charges were laid against Grant, Cole, Bindon, and John Bonham when the band arrived back at their hotel. All four pleaded nolo contendere and received suspended sentences. Bindon was dismissed by Grant and returned to England. Grant later stated that allowing Bindon to be hired was the biggest mistake he ever made as manager.

Whilst tour manager for Led Zeppelin, Cole developed substance abuse problems. He was fired from his position as road manager for Led Zeppelin's final concert tour of Europe in 1980 because Peter Grant was concerned about his drug and alcohol abuse, and was replaced by Phil Carlo. Sent to Italy to detox, Cole was mistaken for a terrorist involved in the 1980 Bologna railway station bombing and was temporarily imprisoned.

== Post-Led Zeppelin ==
After the end of his involvement with Led Zeppelin, Cole served as the tour manager for Eric Clapton, Black Sabbath, Lita Ford, Ozzy Osbourne, Edan Everly, Black Uhuru, and Three Dog Night, managed Fem 2 Fem and, most recently, toured with Gipsy Kings, Crazy Town and Fu Manchu. According to his publisher HarperCollins, he divided his time between Venice, California, and London.

=== Contributions to published accounts ===
Following Led Zeppelin's breakup in 1980, Cole contributed to unofficial Led Zeppelin biographies, including Stephen Davis' biography Hammer of the Gods. Cole claimed he was only paid $1250 by Davis for his revelations, which make up a large proportion of the book. Davis for his part has claimed that Cole "was responsible for much of the mayhem around Led Zeppelin."

In an interview with New Musical Express magazine in 1985, Robert Plant dismissed many of the claims made by Cole in Davis' book, and discussed why Cole was removed as tour manager:

These stories would filter out from girls who'd supposedly been in my room when in fact they'd been in his. That sort of atmosphere was being created, and we were quite tired of it. So eventually we relieved him of his position ... And in the meantime he got paid a lot of money for talking crap. A lot of the time he wasn't completely ...well. And so his view of things was permanently distorted one way or another.

Cole also wrote his own book, an unofficial account of the band called Stairway to Heaven: Led Zeppelin Uncensored, with Richard Trubo. Cole's book raised the ire of Jimmy Page, who once commented:

There's a book written by our former road manager, Richard Cole that has made me completely ill. I'm so mad about it that I can't even bring myself to read the whole thing. The two bits that I have read are so ridiculously false, that I'm sure if I read the rest I'd be able to sue Cole and the publishers. But it would be so painful to read that it wouldn't be worth it.

Led Zeppelin bass player John Paul Jones expressed similar views about Cole's reliability, stating in a magazine interview that Cole's accounts are "a mish-mash of several stories put together, usually with the wrong endings and making us look like miserable bastards rather than the funsters we were." Jones was so incensed at the depiction of John Bonham in Cole's book Stairway to Heaven that he decided never to speak to Cole again. In an interview with PR-Inside online magazine, Jones also claimed when he had once asked Cole about why he'd exaggerated the group's behaviour for that book, Cole explained that "he'd been a drug addict who needed the money".

Despite the bitterness felt by Plant, Page, and Jones about their former road manager, Cole was invited to the VIP section of the Led Zeppelin reunion in 2007.

== Death ==
Cole died at Chelsea and Westminster Hospital on 2 December 2021, at the age of 75 after a battle with cancer.

== References in popular culture ==
Cole can be seen in several scenes of Led Zeppelin's concert film, The Song Remains the Same (1976).

== Sources ==
- Cole, Richard, and Trubo, Richard (1992), Stairway to Heaven: Led Zeppelin Uncensored, New York: HarperCollins, ISBN 0-06-018323-3
- Welch, Chris (2002), Peter Grant: The Man Who Led Zeppelin, London: Omnibus Press. ISBN 0-7119-9195-2.
