= Hélène Lee =

French journalist

Hélène Lee is a French journalist who specialises in Jamaican and West African music.

She started as a journalist in 1979 for Libération and was one of the first to defend the world music in France.

Her early works on African artists helped establish artist like Salif Keita, Alpha Blondy, Ray Lema or Tiken Jah Fakoly. She has published different books related to the Jamaican culture contributing to the development of the reggae music in France and is considered as an expert of the Rasta culture. Other works include documentaries and translations.

She took her name after her wedding with a rasta from Negril, Joseph Lee.

== Bibliography ==
- Lee, Helene (1988). Rockers d'Afrique: Stars et Légendes du Rock Mandingue. Albin Michel, France. ISBN 2-226-03139-1.
- Lee, Helene (1999). Le Premier Rasta. Flammarion, France. ISBN 2-08-067540-0.
- Lee, Helene, Davis, Stephen (foreword) (2005). The First Rasta: Leonard Howell and the Rise of Rastafarianism. Chicago Review Press, USA. ISBN 1-55652-558-3.
- Lee, Helene (2004). Voir Trenchtown et Mourir. Flammarion, France. ISBN 2-08-068405-1.
