= Four Sticks =

- German single picture sleeve

Single by Led Zeppelin

from the album Led Zeppelin IV
- A-side: "Rock and Roll"
- Released: 21 February 1972 (US)
- Recorded: 1971
- Studio: Island, London
- Genre: Hard rock; raga rock
- Length: 4:45
- Label: Atlantic
- Songwriters: Jimmy Page; Robert Plant
- Producer: Jimmy Page

Led Zeppelin singles chronology
| "Black Dog" (1971) | "Four Sticks" (1972) | "Over the Hills and Far Away" (1973) |

Audio sample
- file; help

"Four Sticks" is a song by the English rock band Led Zeppelin from their untitled fourth album (1971). The title reflects drummer John Bonham's performance with two drumsticks in each hand, totaling four.

The song was difficult to record, and required more takes than usual. John Paul Jones played a VCS3 synthesizer on the track. The song has an unusual time signature, featuring riffs in a mixture of 5/8 and 6/8. The notoriously complex and difficult song was only performed once live by John Bonham May 3rd, 1971, at the KB Hallen Copenhagen, Denmark, confirmed by a rare bootleg recording. Note that this was six months prior to the album debut of November 8, 1971.

== Personnel ==
According to Jean-Michel Guesdon and Philippe Margotin:

- Robert Plant – vocals
- Jimmy Page – acoustic guitar, electric guitars (six-string and twelve-string)
- John Paul Jones – bass, synthesiser
- John Bonham – drums

== Four Hands ==
The song was re-recorded by Jimmy Page and Robert Plant with the Bombay Symphony Orchestra in 1972, during their trip to India, along with another song, "Friends" from Led Zeppelin III. This version featured tablas and sitars. The recording, titled "Four Hands" was released officially on the 2015 remastering of Coda.

== See also ==
- List of cover versions of Led Zeppelin songs § Four Sticks (including versions by Page and Plant)

== Bibliography ==
- Guesdon, Jean-Michel; Margotin, Philippe (2018). Led Zeppelin All the Songs: The Story Behind Every Track. Running Press. ISBN 978-0-316-448-67-3.
