= Watch You Bleed: The Saga of Guns N' Roses =

2008 biography by Stephen Davis

- First edition
- Author: Stephen Davis
- Language: English
- Publisher: Gotham Books
- Publication date: 2008
- Publication place: United States
- Media type: Hardcover
- Pages: 448
- ISBN: 978-1-59240-377-6
- OCLC: 223800659
- Dewey Decimal: 782.42166092/2 B 22
- LC Class: ML421.G86 D38 2008

Watch You Bleed: The Saga of Guns N' Roses is a rock biography written by Stephen Davis, published by Gotham Press and released August 26, 2008. It chronicles the story of U.S. hard rock band Guns N' Roses from their earliest days up to the year of publication.

== Background ==
Watch You Bleed documents the history of Guns N' Roses from the earliest childhood days of singer W. Axl Rose and his lifelong friendship with guitarist Izzy Stradlin to the formation of the band, their years at the top of the music world and eventual downfall. Most of the book is dedicated to the band's early period from 1985 to the release of the Use Your Illusion albums in 1991. There is some charting of the former members' later careers with bands like Velvet Revolver and also of Rose's efforts to record and release the Chinese Democracy album, finally released on November 23, 2008.
