= Hammer of the Gods (book) =

1985 book by Stephen Davis

- First edition
- Author: Stephen Davis
- Language: English
- Subject: Biography
- Genre: Non-fiction
- Publisher: William Morrow & Co
- Publication date: 1985
- Media type: Print
- ISBN: 0-688-04507-3
- OCLC: 11371190
- Dewey Decimal: 784.5/4/00922 B 19
- LC Class: ML421.L4 D4 1985

Hammer of the Gods is a book written by music journalist Stephen Davis, published in 1985. It is an unauthorized biography of the English rock band Led Zeppelin. Davis travelled with Led Zeppelin for two weeks at the beginning of the band's 1975 U.S. Tour, while he was a music journalist at Rolling Stone magazine.

After its release it became a New York Times bestseller paperback. It has been reprinted three times since its first publication and has been released under the alternative title Hammer of the Gods: The Led Zeppelin Saga. The title is derived from a line in "Immigrant Song", a track from the band's third album.

== Criticism ==
Chicago Tribune music reviewer Greg Kot called it "one of the most notorious rock biographies ever written". All three surviving members of the band have cast doubts on its accuracy, with one article summarising their collective view of the book as a "catalogue of error and distortion".

"I opened it up in the middle somewhere and started to read it, and I just threw it out the window," said guitarist Jimmy Page. "I was living by a river then, so it actually found its way to the bottom of the sea."

"The guy who wrote that book knew nothing about the band," said vocalist Robert Plant. "I think he'd hung around us once. He got all his information from a guy who had a heroin problem who happened to be associated with us. The only thing I read was the 'After Zeppelin' part, because I was eager to get on with the music and stop living in a dream state."

"It's a very sad little book," said bassist John Paul Jones. "It made us out to be sad little people. He ruined a lot of good, funny stories."

One of the author's primary sources of information was Richard Cole, the band's tour manager. As Plant explained:

"[Davis] did a lot of investigations with a guy who used to work with Led Zeppelin, Richard Cole, who, over the years, had shown deep frustration at not being in a position to have any authority at all. He was tour manager and he had a problem which could have been easily solved if he'd been given something intelligent to do rather than check the hotels, and I think it embittered him greatly. He became progressively unreliable and, sadly, became a millstone around the neck of the group. These stories would filter out from girls who'd supposedly been in my room when in fact they'd been in his. That sort of atmosphere was being created, and we were quite tired of it. So eventually we relieved him of his position and in the meantime he got paid a lot of money for talking crap. A lot of the time he wasn't completely well. And so his view of things was permanently distorted one way or another."

Former manager Peter Grant told Proximity magazine that the book was "completely unreliable" and that Davis had asked for money from him over the manuscript, before publication. Grant refused.

"There are some very funny stories in that book," Jones conceded, "but oh-so inaccurate. There were other bands that were far worse than us. The Who used to blow things up! Most of the towns we played in America in those days, everybody went to bed at 10.30. Everywhere closed around the time we played 'Whole Lotta Love'."

The negativity of the book, along with other controversial music biographies by Davis, earned him the industry nickname "Stephen Salacious".

Cole subsequently published his own autobiography that included his tenure as tour manager with Led Zeppelin, entitled Stairway to Heaven: Led Zeppelin Uncensored (1992), which was also criticized by members of the band.
