= Stairway to Heaven: Led Zeppelin Uncensored =

1992 non-fiction book by Richard Cole

- Author: Richard Cole
- Language: English
- Subject: Biography
- Genre: Non-fiction
- Publisher: HarperCollins
- Publication date: Aug 1992
- Media type: Print (Paperback)
- Pages: 384 pp
- ISBN: 978-0-06-018323-3
- OCLC: 25547803

Stairway to Heaven: Led Zeppelin Uncensored is a book written by Richard Cole who was the tour manager for English rock band Led Zeppelin, from their first US tour in 1968 to 1979, when he was replaced by Phil Carlo. The book was co-written with Richard Trubo, a syndicated journalist, and was first published in August 1992.

== Synopsis ==
The beginning of the book describes Cole's background, and that of every member of the band. He also briefly describes the atmosphere of 1960s London. He claims that he always wanted to be in the music business, and that at one point he began to play the drums but did not pursue this path. He recounts his experience as tour manager for The Who and his venture into other aspects of the 1960s London scene, including the mod subculture.

The book documents Cole's personal experiences as tour manager for one of the biggest bands of all time. It also shows how the constant pressure of touring and recording was beginning to take a toll on the band's members, even as early as 1969.

Cole reveals that he developed close and personal friendships with each of the band members, and recounts the devastating impact that the death of John Bonham had on him. He also discusses the substance abuse problems which he developed in the 1970s, and which ultimately led to him being fired by Led Zeppelin's manager, Peter Grant, after the Knebworth Festival in 1979.

The book also describes his life immediately after Led Zeppelin's downfall. At the time of their collapse he was trying to shed his heroin addiction in Italy when he was falsely accused of terrorism for involvement in the 1980 Bologna railway station bombing. Whilst imprisoned he underwent forced detox from heroin. Sleepless nights, constant sweat, diarrhea, and pain were some things he experienced while he was in the custody of the Italian police.

When released, Cole was no longer addicted to heroin but he had no money as he had spent it all on drugs prior to his incarceration, and he could no longer rely on a steady income from an involvement with Led Zeppelin. He said that for the first time since before he became a tour manager he had to work on the scaffolds.

== Criticism ==
Many reviewers took note of the sensationalist and sordid 'tell-all' style of Cole's account. A review Publishers Weekly stated:

Alcohol, cocaine and heroin abuse, shameless groupies and perverse pranks figure largely in the saga. Cole boasts of his and the band's phenomenal appetites for liquor, drugs and sex while denouncing those who say Led Zeppelin harmed the international legions of teenage girls who routinely sought rock-star notches in their bedposts.

However, despite that he was also credited with "celebrat[ing] the band's innumerable musical accomplishments", Cole's book was criticised by members of Led Zeppelin, who accused him of fabrication and dishonesty. Guitarist Jimmy Page once commented:

There's a book written by our former road manager, Richard Cole that has made me completely ill. I'm so mad about it that I can't even bring myself to read the whole thing. The two bits that I have read are so ridiculously false, that I'm sure if I read the rest I'd be able to sue Cole and the publishers. But it would be so painful to read that it wouldn't be worth it.

Bass player John Paul Jones has expressed similar views about Cole's reliability, stating in a magazine interview that Cole's accounts are "a mish-mash of several stories put together, usually with the wrong endings and making us look miserable bastards rather than the funsters we were." Jones was so incensed at the depiction of John Bonham in Cole's book that he decided never to speak to him again. In another interview, Jones claimed when he asked Cole about why he'd exaggerated the group's behaviour for the book, Cole explained that "he'd been a drug addict who needed the money".
