= Misty Mountain Hop =

1971 song by Led Zeppelin

- French single sleeve

Single by Led Zeppelin

from the album Led Zeppelin IV
- A-side: "Black Dog"
- Released: 2 December 1971 (US)
- Recorded: 1971
- Studio: Headley Grange, Hampshire, England
- Genre: Hard rock
- Length: 4:39
- Label: Atlantic
- Songwriters: John Paul Jones; Jimmy Page; Robert Plant
- Producer: Jimmy Page

Led Zeppelin singles chronology
"Immigrant Song" (1970)	"Misty Mountain Hop" (1971)	"Rock and Roll" (1972)

"Misty Mountain Hop" is a song by the English rock band Led Zeppelin that was released in 1971 by Atlantic Records. The song appears on the band's untitled fourth album (referred to as Led Zeppelin IV), and was released as the B-side to the single "Black Dog" and performed in most of the band's 1972 and 1973 concert tours. In 2019, Rolling Stone ranked "Misty Mountain Hop" as number 10 on its list of the 40 greatest Led Zeppelin songs.

== Lyrics and recording ==
The most common interpretation of the song's title involves a reference to the Misty Mountains in J. R. R. Tolkien's The Hobbit. The lyrics refer to the events of 7 July 1968 "Legalise Pot Rally" in Hyde Park, London, in which police made arrests for marijuana possession. The lyrics reflect Plant's quest for a better society, a place and time when hangups are replaced with individual freedom and a life of mutual support and rapport.

The song was recorded at Headley Grange, a mansion where the band sometimes lived in Hampshire, England.

== Personnel ==
According to Jean-Michel Guesdon and Philippe Margotin:

- Robert Plant – vocals
- Jimmy Page – electric guitars
- John Paul Jones – bass, electric piano
- John Bonham – drums

== Releases and versions ==
The song was released as the B-side to the single "Black Dog", which was released in the United States on 2 December 1971, continental Europe (the United Kingdom did not receive the single release), and Australia.

A different version of this song is featured on the second disc of the remastered two CD deluxe edition of Led Zeppelin IV.

== Live performances ==
The band performed the song at the 3 May 1971 Copenhagen concert (song's first concert performance) and then at the 1972 and 1973 concert tours. Band member Robert Plant performed it for most of his own solo concerts since the 1980 band breakup. Plant also performed it with the surviving members of the band at the 10 December 2007 tribute concert for Ahmet Ertegun.

== See also ==
- 1971 in British music
- List of cover versions of Led Zeppelin songs § Misty Mountain Hop
- Works inspired by J. R. R. Tolkien

== Bibliography ==
- Guesdon, Jean-Michel; Margotin, Philippe (2018). Led Zeppelin All the Songs: The Story Behind Every Track. Running Press. ISBN 978-0-316-448-67-3.
