= Stephen Davis (music journalist) =

American music journalist

Stephen Davis is an American music journalist.

Davis was born in New York City and attended Boston University. He began his career writing for the Boston Phoenix in 1970. His journalism has appeared in Rolling Stone, The New York Times, the Boston Globe and numerous other newspapers and magazines.

The negativity and purported inaccuracy of his Led Zeppelin biography Hammer of the Gods, along with other controversial works, earned him the nickname "Stephen Salacious".

== Published works ==
- Reggae Bloodlines: In Search of the Music and Culture of Jamaica, with photographs by Peter Simon, Da Capo Press (1977), 1992, ISBN 0-306-80496-4
- Reggae International, with photographs of Peter Simon, 1982, R&B Books, USA, ISBN 0-394-71313-3
- Bob Marley: The Biography, 1983, A Barker, ISBN 0-213-16859-6
- Hammer of the Gods: The Led Zeppelin Saga, Berkley Publishing Group (1985), 1997, ISBN 0-345-33516-3
- Hammer of the Gods: "Led Zeppelin" Unauthorised, Macmillan, 2005, ISBN 0-330-43859-X
- Fleetwood: My Life and Adventures in Fleetwood Mac, by Mick Fleetwood, William Morrow & Company, 1990, ISBN 0-688-06647-X
- Jajouka Rolling Stone: A Fable of Gods and Heroes, Random House Trade, 1993, ISBN 0-679-42119-X
- This Wheel's on Fire – Levon Helm and the Story of The Band, with Levon Helm, Plexus Publishing, 1994, ISBN 0-85965-216-5
- Bob Marley: Conquering Lion of Reggae, Plexus Publishing, 1994, ISBN 0-85965-222-X
- Bob Marley, revised edition, Schenkman Books, 1998, ISBN 0-87047-044-2
- Walk This Way: The Autobiography of Aerosmith, with Aerosmith, HarperCollins, 1997, ISBN 0-380-97594-7
- Old Gods Almost Dead: The 40-Year Odyssey of the Rolling Stones, Broadway, USA, 2001, ISBN 0-7679-0312-9
- Jim Morrison: Life, Death, Legend, Ebury Press, 2004, ISBN 0-09-190041-7
- Watch You Bleed: The Saga of Guns N' Roses, Gotham Press, 2008, ISBN 978-1-59240-377-6
- Introduction of The First Rasta: Leonard Howell and the Rise of Rastafarianism, by Helene Lee, Chicago Review Press, 2005, ISBN 1-55652-558-3
- LZ-'75: The Lost Chronicles of Led Zeppelin's 1975 American Tour, Gotham Books, 2010, ISBN 1-59240-589-4
- Please Please Tell Me Now: The Duran Duran Story, Hachette Books, 2021, ISBN 978-0-306-84606-9
