= Celebration Day =

1970 song by Led Zeppelin

Song by Led Zeppelin

from the album Led Zeppelin III
- Released: 5 October 1970
- Recorded: May–June 1970 (?); 3 June 1970
- Studio: Rolling Stones Mobile Studio, Headley Grange, Hampshire; Olympic Sound Studios, London
- Genre: Hard rock; funk rock
- Length: 3:29
- Label: Atlantic
- Songwriter(s): Jimmy Page; Robert Plant; John Paul Jones
- Producer(s): Jimmy Page

"Celebration Day" is a song by English rock band Led Zeppelin, and the third track from their 1970 album Led Zeppelin III. The band's last concert film and album, released on 19 November 2012, took their name from this song.

== Composition and recording ==
The song starts with guitar chords played over a monotonic drone created by a synthesiser. This connects the song musically with the preceding track on the album, "Friends", which ends with the same drone. Originally, one of John Bonham's drum tracks was to be used in the intro of "Celebration Day", but an engineer accidentally erased the recording. Unable or unwilling to re-record it, they used the synthesizer drone from the end of "Friends" to fill up the gap. The recording took place at Headley Grange, England, with the Rolling Stones' mobile recording studio.

Robert Plant's lyrics were inspired by his initial impressions of New York City. On Zeppelin's 1971 concert tour of the United States, he would sometimes introduce it as "The New York Song". "Celebration Day" was often played live in Led Zeppelin concerts from 1971 to 1973, and was returned to the band's setlist at the Knebworth Festival in 1979, where Page performed the song using his Gibson EDS-1275 double-necked guitar.

Record producer Rick Rubin has said of the song: "["Celebration Day"] feels like a freight train, even though it's not one of their heavier songs. There's tremendous momentum in the way they play together. The bass playing is beyond incredible and the guitars interact really well—there's a heavy-riffing guitar, which is answered by a funky guitar."

== Other versions ==
A live version of the song from the band's 1973 U.S. tour was recorded and included on their concert soundtrack The Song Remains the Same. The album's accompanying film of the same name, released in 1976, did not include a live video of "Celebration Day". However, when the album and the film were reissued in 2007 (the latter in DVD format), both featured the song. This reissued version is slightly different from the one that was included on the 1976 album, in particular featuring a different guitar solo.

Page performed "Celebration Day" on his tour with the Black Crowes in 1999, and another version performed by them can be found on the album Live at the Greek.

== Reception ==
In a contemporary review of Led Zeppelin III, Lester Bangs of Rolling Stone described "Celebration Day", along with "Out on the Tiles", as "production-line Zep churners that no fan could fault and no one else could even hear without an effort."

== Personnel ==
According to Jean-Michel Guesdon and Philippe Margotin:

- Robert Plant – vocals
- Jimmy Page – guitars
- John Paul Jones – bass
- John Bohnam – drums

== See also ==
- List of cover versions of Led Zeppelin songs § Celebration Day

== Bibliography ==
- Guesdon, Jean-Michel; Margotin, Philippe (2018). Led Zeppelin All the Songs: The Story Behind Every Track. Running Press. ISBN 978-0-316-448-67-3.
