= Immigrant Song =

1970 song by Led Zeppelin

- Dutch single picture sleeve

Single by Led Zeppelin

from the album Led Zeppelin III
- B-side: "Hey, Hey, What Can I Do"
- Released: 5 November 1970
- Recorded: May–June 1970 (?); 29 May 1970
- Studio: Rolling Stones Mobile Studio, Headley Grange, Hampshire; Olympic Sound Studios, London
- Genre: Hard rock; Viking metal; folk metal; heavy metal
- Length: 2:26
- Label: Atlantic
- Songwriters: Jimmy Page, Robert Plant
- Producer: Jimmy Page

Led Zeppelin US singles chronology
"Whole Lotta Love" (1969)	"Immigrant Song" (1970)	"Black Dog" (1971)

Audio sample
- file; help

"Immigrant Song" is a song by the English rock band Led Zeppelin. Built upon a riff, it alludes to Norse mythology, with singer Robert Plant's howling vocals mentioning war-making and Valhalla. The song was included on their 1970 album Led Zeppelin III and released as a single. Several live recordings have also been issued on various Led Zeppelin albums. Other artists have recorded renditions of the song or performed it live.

Though Led Zeppelin are typically regarded as an album-oriented group, "Immigrant Song" is one of the band's several hit singles. The song's popularity has led to its inclusion in such compilation albums as Led Zeppelin Remasters (1990) and Early Days: The Best of Led Zeppelin, Vol. 1 (1999).

== Background ==
"Immigrant Song" was written during Led Zeppelin's tour of Iceland, Bath and Germany in the summer of 1970. The opening date of this tour took place in Reykjavík, Iceland, which inspired Plant to write the lyrics. He explained in an interview:

We weren't being pompous ... We did come from the land of the ice and snow. We were guests of the Icelandic government on a cultural mission. We were invited to play a concert in Reykjavik, and the day before we arrived, all the civil servants went on strike and the gig was going to be cancelled. The university prepared a concert hall for us and it was phenomenal. The response from the kids was remarkable and we had a great time. "Immigrant Song" was about that trip and it was the opening track on the album that was intended to be incredibly different.

Six days after Led Zeppelin's appearance in Reykjavik, the band performed the song for the first time in concert during the Bath Festival.

== Composition and lyrics ==
The song begins with a repeating, staccato riff by guitarist Jimmy Page and drummer John Bonham. Bassist John Paul Jones comes in on the ninth measure. It is performed in the key of F♯ minor at a moderate tempo of 112 beats per minute. A distinctive, wailing cry from Plant sets in after eight repeats. A very faint count-off in a different tempo (about 150 bpm) occurs at the beginning of the track, with much hiss, which appears on the album version, but is trimmed from the single version. The hiss is feedback from an echo unit.

A phrase from the song was used as the title of Stephen Davis' biography of the band, Hammer of the Gods: The Led Zeppelin Saga. The lyrics also did much to inspire the classic heavy metal myth, of Viking-esque figures on an adventure, themes that have been adopted in the look and lyrics of bands such as Iron Maiden, Saxon, Manowar, Bathory, Enslaved and Amon Amarth.

== Personnel ==
According to Jean-Michel Guesdon and Philippe Margotin:

- Robert Plant – vocals
- Jimmy Page – guitar
- John Paul Jones – bass
- John Bonham – drums

== Releases ==
Detail of the 45 rpm single of "Immigrant Song" showing a secret inscription, "Do what thou wilt shall be the whole of the law"

"Immigrant Song" is one of Led Zeppelin's few releases on the 45 rpm single format. It was issued in the United States on 5 November 1970 by Atlantic Records, with the non-album track "Hey, Hey, What Can I Do" on the B-side, and reached number 16 on the Billboard Hot 100. First pressings of the US single have a quote from Aleister Crowley inscribed in dead wax by the run-out groove: "Do what thou wilt shall be the whole of the Law." The Japanese single included "Out on the Tiles" as the B-side.

== Reception ==
In a contemporary review of Led Zeppelin III, Lester Bangs of Rolling Stone described "Immigrant Song" as the closest to being as classic as "Whole Lotta Love", praising the song's "bulldozer rhythms and Plant's double-tracked wordless vocal crossings echoing behind the main vocal like some cannibal chorus wailing in the infernal light of a savage fertility rite." In March 2023, Rolling Stone ranked "Immigrant Song" at number 18 on their "100 Greatest Heavy Metal Songs of All Time" list.

Cash Box described the song as "filling the aural spectrum once again with wall-to-wall power", stating that the song has "biting vocals and an unmatched instrumental impact."

== Live performances ==
Led Zeppelin used "Immigrant Song" to open their concerts from 1970 to 1972. On the second half of their 1972 concert tour of the United States, it was introduced by a short piece of music known as "LA Drone". By 1973, "Immigrant Song" was occasionally being used as an encore, but was then removed from their live set. Live versions of the song can be heard on the Led Zeppelin albums How the West Was Won (featuring a performance at Long Beach Arena in 1972) and the Led Zeppelin BBC Sessions (a version from the Paris Theatre in London in 1971). When the song was played live, Page included a lengthy guitar solo that was absent on the recorded Led Zeppelin III version. Page and Jeff Beck played "Immigrant Song" as part of the 2009 Rock and Roll Hall of Fame induction ceremony for Beck.

== Use of the song in media ==
Led Zeppelin originally denied Richard Linklater permission to use "Immigrant Song" in School of Rock (2003), but star and lead actor of the movie, Jack Black, was able to convince them by making a video of himself performing the song. In the movie Shrek the Third (2007), "Immigrant Song" appears in a battle scene involving the character Snow White. A cover of "Immigrant Song", produced by Atticus Ross and Nine Inch Nails member Trent Reznor with vocals from Yeah Yeah Yeahs lead singer Karen O, plays in the trailer and throughout the title sequence of The Girl with the Dragon Tattoo (2011). "Immigrant Song" was included in both the trailer for Thor: Ragnarok (2017) and twice in the film itself, due to director Taika Waititi's suggestion of the song from the time of his first involvement with the film and to the persistent efforts of the movie's music supervisor Dave Jordan. Also in 2017 the song was used in the opening of American Gods, for which the series received an Emmy nomination for Outstanding Main Title Design.In the oscar awarded documentary "One Day in September" from 1999 directed by Kevin Macdonald, the full song was used combining pictures from track and fields and the hostage of Israeli Athletes on 5th September 1972.

== Chart history ==
=== Original release ===
Weekly charts

Chart (1970–1971)	Peak position
Australia (Kent Music Report)	20
Australia (Go-Set National Top 60)	16
Austria (Ö3 Austria Top 40)	13
Canada (CHUM)	2
Canada Top Singles (RPM)	4
Denmark (Tipparaden)	3
Finland (Suomen virallinen lista)	22
Germany (GfK)	6
Japan (Oricon)	13
Netherlands (Dutch Top 40)	11
Netherlands (Single Top 100)	9
New Zealand (RIANZ)	4
South Africa (Springbok Radio)	7
Spanish Singles Chart	9
Switzerland (Schweizer Hitparade)	4
US Billboard Hot 100	16
US Cash Box	8
US Record World	10

Year-end charts

Chart (1971)	Rank
Canada Top Singles (RPM)	92
Netherlands (Single Top 100)	91

=== Digital download ===
Chart (2007)	Peak position
Canadian (Hot Canadian Digital Singles)	54
UK (Official Charts Company)	109
US Billboard Hot Digital Songs	69

Note: The official UK Singles Chart incorporated legal downloads as of 17 April 2005.

Chart (2014)	Peak position
US Billboard Hard Rock Digital Song Sales	1

== Certifications ==
Region	Certification	Certified units/sales
Italy (FIMI)	Platinum	100,000^{‡}
New Zealand (RMNZ)	2× Platinum	60,000^{‡}
Spain (Promusicae)	Platinum	60,000^{‡}
United Kingdom (BPI)	Platinum	600,000^{‡}
^{‡} Sales+streaming figures based on certification alone.

== See also ==
- List of cover versions of Led Zeppelin songs – "Immigrant Song" entries

== Bibliography ==
- Guesdon, Jean-Michel; Margotin, Philippe (2018). Led Zeppelin All the Songs: The Story Behind Every Track. Running Press. ISBN 978-0-316-448-67-3.
