= Led Zeppelin IV =

Untitled
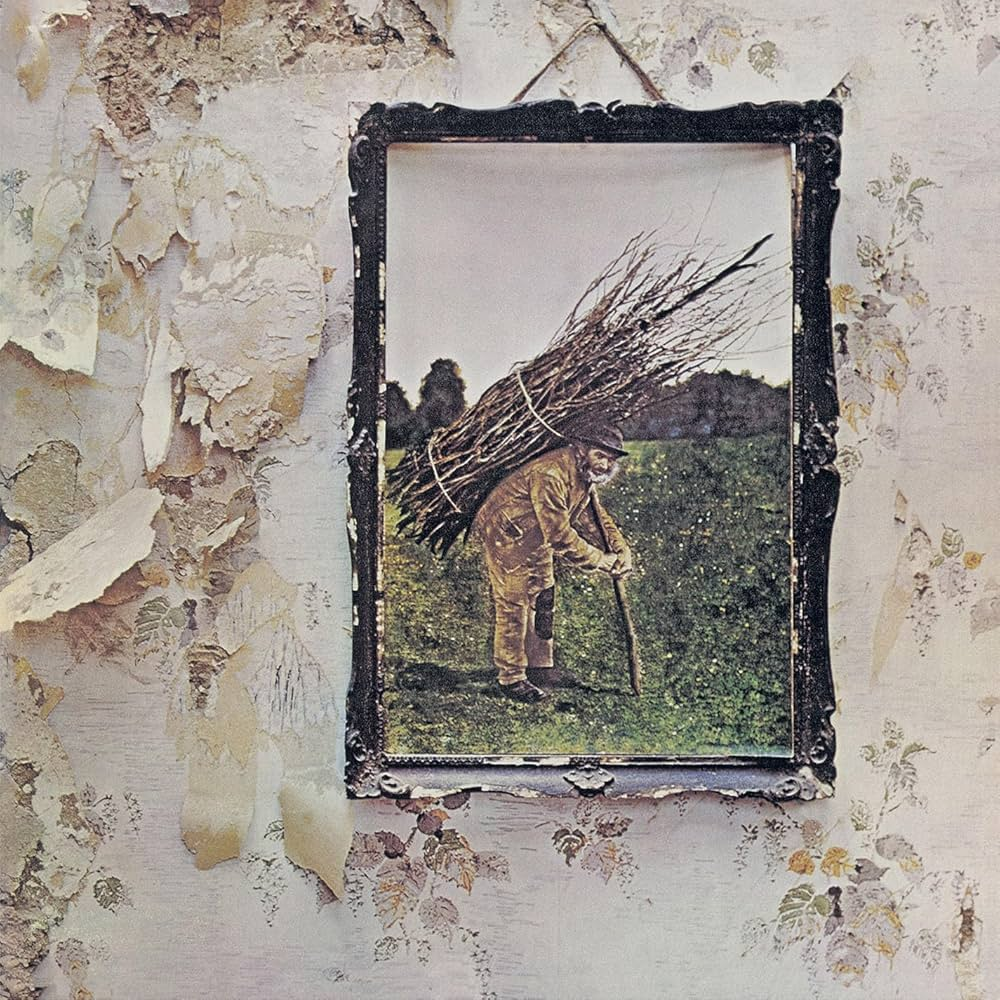

Studio album by Led Zeppelin
- Released: 8 November 1971
- Recorded: 5 December 1970 – February 1971
- Studios: Rolling Stones Mobile Studio at Headley Grange, Headley; Island, London; Sunset Sound, Los Angeles
- Genres: Hard rock; folk; blues rock
- Length: 42:37
- Label: Atlantic
- Producer: Jimmy Page

Led Zeppelin chronology
Led Zeppelin III (1970)	Untitled (1971)	Houses of the Holy (1973)

Singles from untitled
- 1. "Black Dog" / "Misty Mountain Hop" Released: 2 December 1971; 2. "Rock and Roll" / "Four Sticks" Released: 21 February 1972

The untitled fourth studio album by the English rock band Led Zeppelin, commonly known as Led Zeppelin IV, (Note: While most commonly called Led Zeppelin IV, Atlantic Records catalogues have used the names Four Symbols and The Fourth Album; it has also been referred to as ZoSo (which Page's symbol appears to spell), Untitled, and Runes) was released on 8 November 1971, by Atlantic Records. It was produced by the band's guitarist, Jimmy Page, and recorded between December 1970 and February 1971, mostly in the country house Headley Grange. The album contains one of the band's best-known recordings, the eight-minute-long "Stairway to Heaven".

The informal recording environment inspired the band, allowing them to try different arrangements of material and create songs in various styles. After the previous album Led Zeppelin III (1970) received lukewarm reviews from critics, they decided their fourth album would officially be untitled and represented instead by four symbols – one chosen by each band member – without featuring the name or any other details on the cover. Unlike the prior two albums, the band was joined by guest musicians: singer Sandy Denny on "The Battle of Evermore", and pianist Ian Stewart on "Rock and Roll". As with prior albums, most of the material was written by the band, though there was a re-working of the Memphis Minnie blues song "When the Levee Breaks".

Led Zeppelin IV was an immediate critical and commercial success and is Led Zeppelin's best-selling album, having sold over 37 million copies worldwide. It is one of the best-selling albums in the United States and of all time, while critics have regularly placed it high on lists of the greatest albums of all time.

== Writing and recording ==
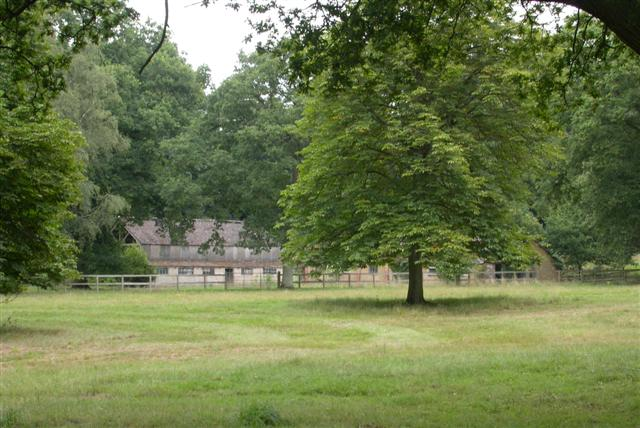
Most of the album was recorded at Headley Grange in Hampshire.

Following the release of Led Zeppelin III in October 1970, the group took a break from live performances to concentrate on recording a follow-up. They turned down all touring offers, including a proposed New Year's Eve gig that would have been broadcast on television. They returned to Bron-Yr-Aur, a country house in Snowdonia, Wales, to write new material.

Recording sessions for the album began at Island Records' new studios on Basing Street in London on 5 December 1970, with the recording of "Black Dog". The group had considered Mick Jagger's home, Stargroves, as a recording location, but decided it was too expensive. They subsequently moved the following month to Headley Grange, a country house in Hampshire, England, using the Rolling Stones Mobile Studio and engineer Andy Johns, with the Stones' Ian Stewart assisting. Johns had just worked on engineering Sticky Fingers and recommended the mobile studio. Guitarist and producer Jimmy Page later recalled: "We needed the sort of facilities where we could have a cup of tea and wander around the garden and go in and do what we had to do." This relaxed, atmospheric environment at Headley Grange also provided other advantages for the band, as they were able to capture spontaneous performances immediately, with some tracks arising from the communal jamming. Bassist and keyboardist John Paul Jones remembered there was no bar or leisure facilities, but this helped focus the group on the music without being distracted.

Once the basic tracks had been recorded, the band added overdubs at Island Studios in February. The band spent five days at Island, before Page then took the multitrack tapes to Sunset Sound in Los Angeles for mixing on 9 February, on Johns's recommendation, with a plan for an April 1971 release. Mixing would take ten days, before Page travelled back to London with the newly mixed material. The band had a playback at Olympic Studios. The band disliked the results, and so after touring through the spring and early summer, Page remixed the whole album in July. The album was delayed again over the choice of cover and whether it should be a double album, with a possible suggestion it could be issued as a set of EPs.

== Songs ==
=== Side one ===
"Black Dog" was named after a dog that hung around Headley Grange during recording. The riff was written by Page and Jones, while the a cappella section was influenced by Fleetwood Mac's "Oh Well". Singer Robert Plant wrote the lyrics, and later sang portions of the song during solo concerts. The guitar solos on the outro were recorded directly into the desk, without using an amplifier.

"Rock and Roll" was a collaboration with Stewart that came out of a jam early in the recording sessions at Headley Grange. Drummer John Bonham created the introduction, which came from jamming around the intro to Little Richard's "Keep A-Knockin'". The track became a live favourite in concert and was performed as the opening number or as an encore. It was released as a promotional single in the US, with stereo and mono mixes on either side of the disc.

"The Battle of Evermore" was written by Page on the mandolin, borrowed from Jones. Plant added lyrics inspired by a book he was reading about the Scottish Independence Wars. The track featured a duet between Plant and Fairport Convention's Sandy Denny, (Note: Plant knew Denny via a mutual friend, the Fairport Convention bassist Dave Pegg. Pegg, Plant and Bonham had played together on the 1960s Birmingham club circuit in the group the Way of Life.) who provided the only female voice to be heard on a Led Zeppelin recording. Plant played the role of narrator in the song, describing events, while Denny sang the part of the town crier representing the people.

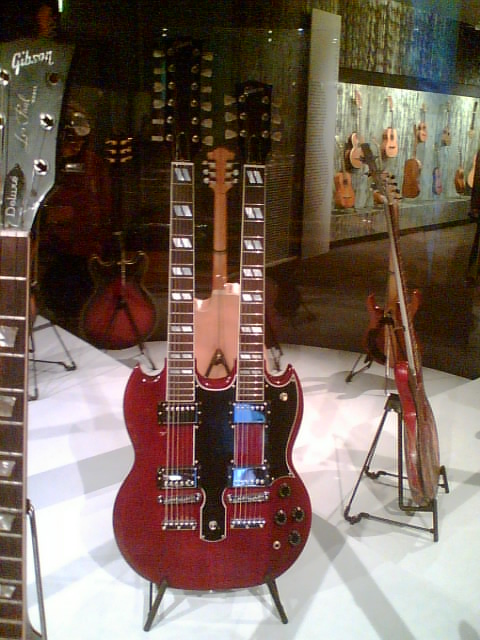
Gibson EDS-1275 guitar used live for "Stairway to Heaven"

"Stairway to Heaven" was mostly written by Page and most of the chord sequence was already worked out when recording started at Basing Street Studios. The lyrics were written by Plant at Headley Grange, about a woman who "took everything without giving anything back". The final take of the song was recorded at Island Studios after the Headley Grange session. The basic backing track featured Bonham on drums, Jones on electric piano and Page on acoustic guitar. The whole group contributed to the arrangement, such as Jones playing recorders on the introduction and Bonham's distinctive drum entry halfway through the piece. Page played the guitar solo using a Fender Telecaster he had received from Jeff Beck. It had been his main guitar on the group's first album and early live shows. He put down three different takes of the solo and picked the best to put on the album.

The song was considered the standout track on the album and was played on FM radio stations frequently, but the group resisted all suggestions to release it as a single. It became the centrepiece of the group's live set from 1971 onwards. In order to replicate the changes between acoustic, electric and twelve-string guitar on the studio recording, Page played a Gibson EDS-1275 double-neck guitar during the song.

=== Side two ===
"Misty Mountain Hop" was written at Headley Grange and featured Jones playing electric piano. Plant wrote the lyrics about dealing with the clash between students and police over drug possession. The title came from J. R. R. Tolkien's The Hobbit. Plant later performed the track on solo tours.

"Four Sticks" took its title from Bonham playing the drum pattern that runs throughout the song with four drum sticks, and Jones played analog synth. The track was more difficult to record than the other material on the album, requiring numerous takes. It was played live occasionally in early 1971. The song was also re-recorded with the Bombay Symphony Orchestra in 1972. This version appeared on the deluxe edition reissue of the group's 1982 album Coda. The song was also reworked for Page and Plant's 1994 album No Quarter: Jimmy Page and Robert Plant Unledded.

"Going to California" was a quiet acoustic number. It was written by Page and Plant about Californian earthquakes, and trying to find the perfect woman. The music was inspired by Joni Mitchell, of whom both Plant and Page were fans. The track was originally titled "Guide To California"; the final title came from the trip to Los Angeles to mix the album.

"When the Levee Breaks" came from a blues song recorded by Memphis Minnie and Kansas Joe McCoy in 1929. The track opened with Bonham's heavy unaccompanied drumming, which was recorded in the lobby of Headley Grange using two Beyerdynamic M 160 microphones suspended above a flight of stairs; output from these were passed to a limiter. A Binson Echorec, a delay effects unit, was also used. Page recalled he had tried to record the track at early sessions but it had sounded flat. The unusual locations around the lobby gave the ideal ambience for the drum sound. This introduction was later extensively sampled in hip-hop music during the 1980s. Page and Plant played the song on their 1995 tour promoting No Quarter: Jimmy Page and Robert Plant Unledded.

=== Other songs ===
Three other songs from the sessions, "Down by the Seaside", "Night Flight" and "Boogie with Stu" (featuring Stewart on piano), were included four years later on the double album Physical Graffiti. An early version of "No Quarter" was also recorded at the sessions.

== Title ==
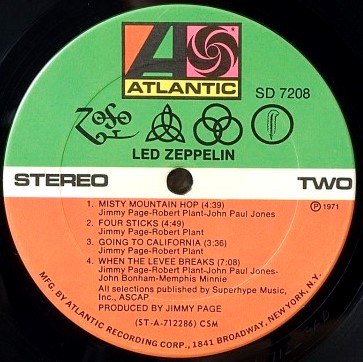
The original vinyl record label with the four hand-drawn symbols

After the lukewarm, if not confused and sometimes dismissive, critical reaction Led Zeppelin III had received in late 1970, Page decided that the next Led Zeppelin album would not have a title, but would instead feature four hand-drawn symbols on the inner sleeve and record label, each one chosen by the band member it represents. Atlantic Records were strongly against the idea, but the group stood their ground and refused to hand over the master tapes until their decision had been agreed to.

Page has also stated that the decision to release the album without any written information on the album sleeve was contrary to strong advice given to him by a press agent, who said that after a year's absence from both records and touring, the move would be akin to "professional suicide". Page thought, "We just happened to have a lot of faith in what we were doing." He recalled the record company were insisting that a title had to be on the album, but held his ground, as he felt it would be an answer to critics who could not review one Led Zeppelin album without a point of reference to earlier ones.

Releasing the album without an official title has made it difficult to consistently identify. While most commonly called Led Zeppelin IV, Atlantic Records catalogues have used the names Four Symbols and The Fourth Album. It has also been referred to as ZoSo (which Page's symbol appears to spell), Untitled and Runes. Page frequently refers to the album in interviews as "the fourth album" and "Led Zeppelin IV", and Plant thinks of it as "the fourth album, that's it". The original LP also has no text on the front or back cover, and lacks a catalogue number on the spine.

== Packaging ==
The four symbols represent (from top left clockwise): Page, Jones, Plant, and Bonham

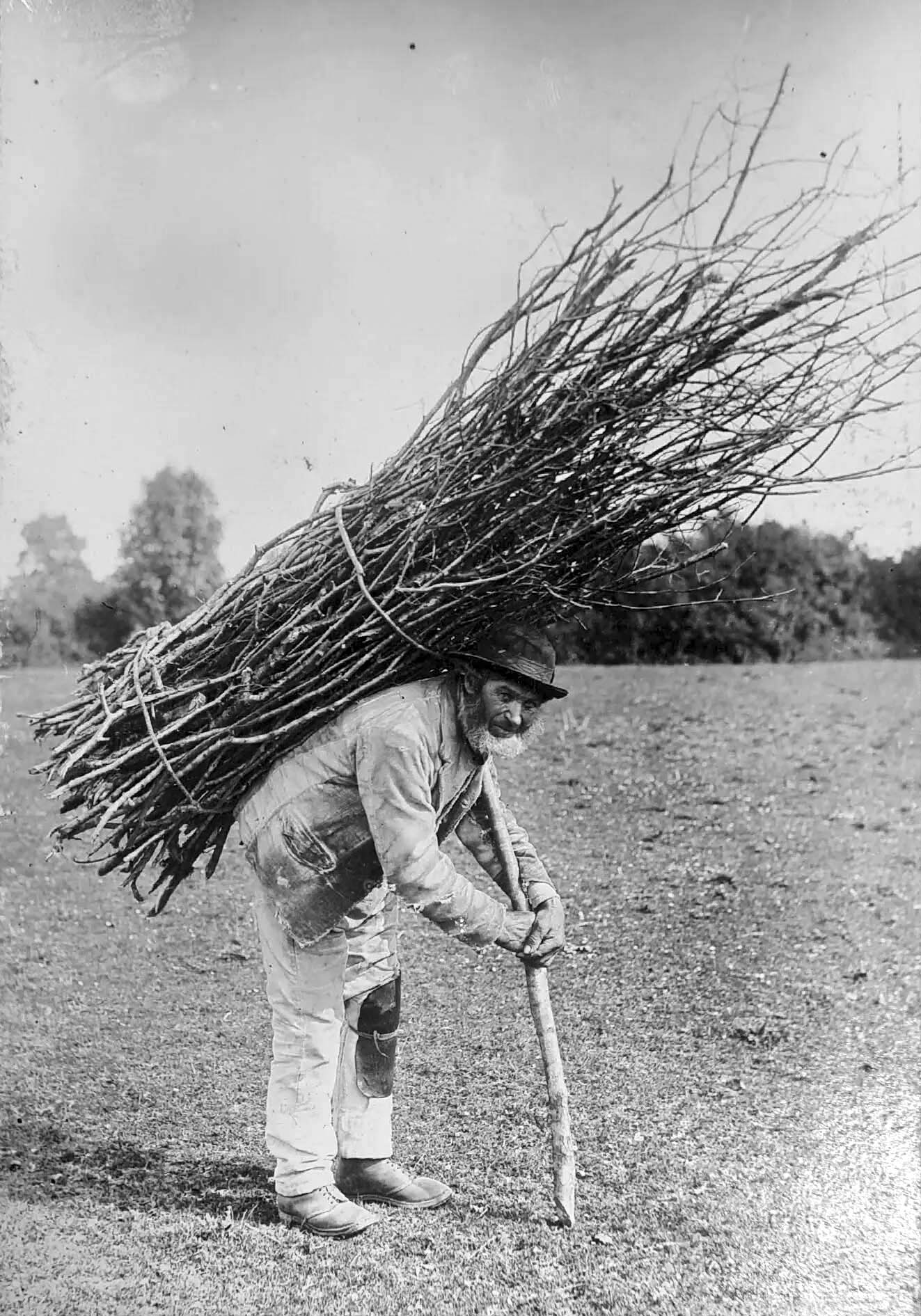
Lot Long, a Wiltshire thatcher in an 1892 photograph by Ernest Howard Farmer

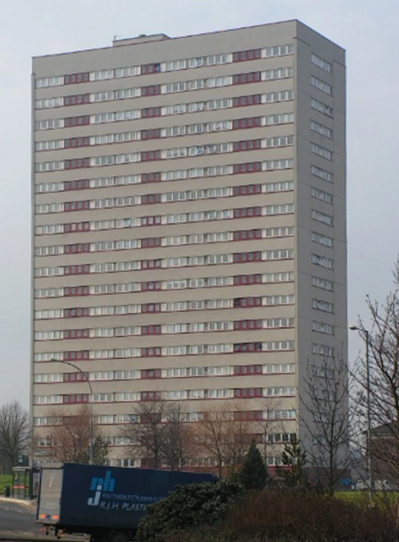
Salisbury Tower, Ladywood, Birmingham.

Sandy Denny's symbol of three downward-pointing equilateral triangles

In place of a title, Page decided each member could choose a personal emblem for the cover. Initially thinking of a single symbol, he then decided there could be four, with each member of the band choosing his own. He designed his own symbol and has never publicly disclosed any reasoning behind it. It has been argued that his symbol appeared as early as 1557 to represent Saturn. The symbol is sometimes referred to as "ZoSo", though Page has explained that it was not in fact intended to be a word at all. Jones's symbol, which he chose from Rudolf Koch's Book of Signs, is a single circle intersecting three vesicae piscis (a triquetra). It is intended to symbolise a person who possesses both confidence and competence. Bonham's symbol, the three interlocking (Borromean) rings, was picked by the drummer from the same book. It represents the triad of mother, father and child, but, also happens to be the logo for the steel and armament producer Krupp and, turned upside down, Ballantine beer. Plant's symbol of a feather within a circle was his own design, being based on the sign of the supposed Mu civilisation. A fifth, smaller symbol chosen by guest vocalist Sandy Denny represents her contribution to "The Battle of Evermore"; the figure, composed of three equilateral triangles, appears on the inner sleeve of the LP, serving as an asterisk.

During Led Zeppelin's tour of the United Kingdom in winter 1971 shortly after the album's release, the symbols could be seen on the group's stage equipment; Page's on one of his amplifiers, Bonham's on his bass drum head, Jones's on a covering for his Rhodes piano, and Plant's on the side of a PA cabinet. Only Page's and Bonham's symbols were retained for subsequent tours.

The picture on the front of the album of an old man carrying a bundle of sticks on his back was bought in an antique shop in Reading, Berkshire by Plant. The picture was then affixed to the internal, papered wall of a partly demolished suburban house for the cover photograph to be taken. Research in 2023 suggests that the image, which had previously been described as an oil painting, is a black and white photograph dating to 1892 which had been hand-coloured. The original photograph was taken by Ernest Howard Farmer (1856–1944), the first head of the school of photography at Regent Street Polytechnic. The research also suggests that the stooped figure is Lot Long (or Lot Longyear, 1823–1893), a thatcher from Mere, Wiltshire. In February 2026, a 60.8 by 44.4 cm (23.9 by 17.5 in) 19th-century gelatin silver print of the photograph, said to be "taken from the original negative of the image ... the largest of its kind", was sold at auction for £16,000.

The block of flats seen on the album is Salisbury Tower in the Ladywood district of Birmingham. Page has explained that the cover of the fourth album was intended to bring out a city/country dichotomy that had initially surfaced on Led Zeppelin III, and a reminder that people should look after the Earth. He later said the cover was supposed to be for "other people to savour" rather than a direct statement. The album cover was among the 10 chosen by the Royal Mail for a set of "Classic Album Cover" postage stamps issued in January 2010.

The inside illustration, entitled "The Hermit", painted by Barrington Coleby (credited to Barrington Colby MOM on the album sleeve), was influenced by the design of the card of the same name in the Rider–Waite tarot deck. This character was later portrayed by Page himself in Led Zeppelin's concert film, The Song Remains the Same (1976). The inner painting is also referred to as View in Half or Varying Light. The typeface for the lyrics to "Stairway to Heaven", printed on the inside sleeve of the album, was Page's contribution. He found it in an Arts and Crafts magazine called The Studio which dated from the late 19th century. He thought the lettering was interesting and arranged for someone to create a whole alphabet.

== Release ==
The album was released by Atlantic on 8 November 1971. It was promoted via a series of teaser advertisements showing the individual symbols on the album artwork. It entered the UK chart at No. 10, rising to No. 1 the following week and has spent a total of 90 weeks on the chart. In the US it was Led Zeppelin's best-selling album, but did not top the Billboard album chart, peaking at No. 2 behind There's a Riot Goin' On by Sly and the Family Stone and Music by Carole King. (Note: Several sources have claimed that King's most critically and commercially successful album, Tapestry, kept Led Zeppelin IV from No. 1, but the latter was still being mixed during the former's chart run over summer 1971.) "Ultimately", writes Lewis, "the fourth Zeppelin album would be the most durable seller in their catalogue and the most impressive critical and commercial success of their career". At one point, it was ranked as one of the top five best-selling albums of all time. The album is one of the best-selling albums of all time with more than 37 million copies sold as of 2014. As of 2021, it is tied for fifth-highest-certified album in the US by the Recording Industry Association of America at 24× Platinum.

The album was reissued several times throughout the 1970s, including a lilac vinyl pressing in 1978, and a box set package in 1988. It was first issued on CD in the 1980s. Page remastered the album in 1990 with engineer George Marino in an attempt to update the catalogue, and several tracks were used for that year's compilation Led Zeppelin Remasters and the Led Zeppelin Boxed Set. All remastered tracks were reissued on The Complete Studio Recordings, while the album was individually reissued on CD in 1994.

A remastered version of Led Zeppelin IV was reissued on 27 October 2014, along with Houses of the Holy. The reissue comes in six formats: a standard CD edition, a deluxe two-CD edition, a standard LP version, a deluxe two-LP version, a super deluxe two-CD plus two-LP version with a hardback book, and as high-resolution 24-bit/96k digital downloads. The deluxe and super deluxe editions feature bonus material. The reissue was released with an inverted colour version of the original album's artwork as its bonus disc's cover. The album's remastered version received widespread acclaim from critics, including Rolling Stone, who found Page's remastering "illuminative".

== Critical reception ==
Professional ratings
Retrospective professional ratings
Aggregate scores
Source	Rating
Metacritic	100/100
Review scores
Source	Rating
AllMusic	5/5 stars
Blender	5/5 stars
Christgau's Record Guide	A
The Encyclopedia of Popular Music	5/5 stars
Entertainment Weekly	A+
Mojo	5/5 stars
MusicHound Rock	5/5
Q	5/5 stars
The Rolling Stone Album Guide	5/5 stars

Led Zeppelin IV received overwhelming praise from critics. In a contemporary review for Rolling Stone, Lenny Kaye called it the band's "most consistently good" album yet and praised the diversity of the songs: "out of eight cuts, there isn't one that steps on another's toes, that tries to do too much all at once." Billboard magazine called it a "powerhouse album" that has the commercial potential of the band's previous three albums. Robert Christgau originally gave Led Zeppelin IV a lukewarm review in The Village Voice, but later called it a masterpiece of "heavy rock". While still finding the band's medieval ideas limiting, he believed the album showed them at the pinnacle of their songwriting, and regarded it as "the definitive Led Zeppelin and hence heavy metal album".

In a retrospective review for AllMusic, Stephen Thomas Erlewine credited the album for "defining not only Led Zeppelin but the sound and style of '70s hard rock", while "encompassing heavy metal, folk, pure rock & roll, and blues". In his album guide to heavy metal, Spin magazine's Joe Gross cited Led Zeppelin IV as a "monolithic cornerstone" of the genre. BBC Music's Daryl Easlea said that the album made the band a global success and effectively combined their third album's folk ideas with their second album's hard rock style, while Katherine Flynn and Julian Ring of Consequence of Sound felt it featured their debut's blues rock, along with the other styles from their second and third albums. Led Zeppelin's Rock and Roll Hall of Fame biography described the album as "a fully realized hybrid of the folk and hard-rock directions". PopMatters journalist AJ Ramirez regarded it as one of the greatest heavy metal albums ever, while Chuck Eddy named it the number one metal album of all time in his 1991 book Stairway to Hell: The 500 Best Heavy Metal Albums in the Universe. According to rock scholar Mablen Jones, Led Zeppelin IV and particularly "Stairway to Heaven" reflected heavy metal's presence in countercultural trends of the early 1970s, as the album "blended post-hippie mysticism, mythological preoccupations, and hard rock".

Steven Hyden observed in 2018 that the album's popularity had given rise to a reflexive bias against it from both fans and critics. "There are two unwritten laws" about the album, he wrote. The first was that a listener must claim a track from side two, the "deep cuts with credibility" side, was his or her favourite, and the second was that one should never say it was their favourite among the band's albums. He blamed this later tendency for why "rock critics who try too hard always make a case for In Through the Out Door being Zeppelin's best." The band members themselves, he noted, also seemed to prefer performing the songs from side two in their solo shows. In 2022, Jenna Scaramanga of Guitar World asserted that "Led Zeppelin IV is not just the greatest guitar album of the 70s, but the benchmark for every guitar band ever since."

=== Accolades ===
In 2000, Led Zeppelin IV was named the 26th-greatest British album in a list by Q magazine. In 2002, Spin magazine's Chuck Klosterman named it the second-greatest metal album of all time and said that it was "the most famous hard-rock album ever recorded" as well as an album that unintentionally created metal—"the origin of everything that sounds, feels, or even tastes vaguely metallic". In 2000 it was voted number 42 in Colin Larkin's All Time Top 1000 Albums. In 2003, the album was ranked number 66 on Rolling Stone magazine's list of "The 500 Greatest Albums of All Time", then re-ranked number 69 in a 2012 revised list, and re-ranked 58 in a 2020 revised list. It was also named the seventh-best album of the 1970s in a list by Pitchfork. In 2016, Classic Rock magazine ranked Led Zeppelin IV as the greatest of all Zeppelin albums.

Accolades for the fourth Led Zeppelin album
Accolade	Publication	Country	Year	Rank
"The 100 Greatest Albums Ever Made"	Mojo	UK	1996	24
Grammy Hall of Fame Award	Grammy Awards	US	1999	*
"Album of the Millennium"	The Guitar	US	1999	2
"100 Greatest Rock Albums Ever"	Classic Rock	UK	2001	1
"500 Greatest Albums Ever"	Rolling Stone	US	2020	58
"Top 100 Albums of the 1970s"	Pitchfork	US	2004	7
1001 Albums You Must Hear Before You Die	Robert Dimery	US	2005	*
"100 Best Albums Ever"	Q	UK	2006	21
"100 Greatest British Rock Albums Ever"	Classic Rock	UK	2006	1
"The Definitive 200: Top 200 Albums of All-Time"	Rock and Roll Hall of Fame	US	2007	4
NME's The 500 Greatest Albums of All Time	NME	UK	2013	106
"The Best Hard Rock Album of Each Year Since 1970"	Loudwire	US	2024	1

* designates unordered lists.

== Track listing ==
=== Original release ===
All tracks are written by Jimmy Page and Robert Plant, except where noted.

Side one
No.	Title	Writer(s)	Length
1.	"Black Dog"	Page; Plant; John Paul Jones	4:55
2.	"Rock and Roll"	Page; Plant; Jones; John Bonham	3:40
3.	"The Battle of Evermore"		5:51
4.	"Stairway to Heaven"		8:02
Total length:			22:28

Side two
No.	Title	Writer(s)	Length
5.	"Misty Mountain Hop"	Page; Plant; Jones	4:38
6.	"Four Sticks"		4:45
7.	"Going to California"		3:32
8.	"When the Levee Breaks"	Page; Plant; Jones; Bonham; Memphis Minnie; (Note: A biography of Memphis Minnie also lists Kansas Joe McCoy as a writer.)	7:08
Total length:			20:03 42:31

=== Deluxe edition (2014) ===
2014 deluxe edition bonus disc
No.	Title	Length
1.	"Black Dog" (Basic track with guitar overdubs)	4:34
2.	"Rock and Roll" (Alternate mix)	3:39
3.	"The Battle of Evermore" (Mandolin/Guitar mix from Headley Grange)	4:13
4.	"Stairway to Heaven" (Sunset Sound mix)	8:03
5.	"Misty Mountain Hop" (Alternate mix)	4:45
6.	"Four Sticks" (Alternate mix)	4:33
7.	"Going to California" (Mandolin/Guitar mix)	3:34
8.	"When the Levee Breaks" (Alternate UK mix)	7:08
Total length:		40:32

== Personnel ==
Led Zeppelin

- Jimmy Page – electric and acoustic guitars, mandolin on "The Battle of Evermore", production, mastering, digital remastering
- Robert Plant – vocals, harmonica on "When the Levee Breaks"
- John Paul Jones – bass, electric piano, mandolin, recorders, synthesiser
- John Bonham – drums

Additional musicians

- Sandy Denny – duet vocals on "The Battle of Evermore"
- Ian Stewart – piano on "Rock and Roll"

Production

- George Chkiantz – mixing
- Andy Johns – engineering, mixing
- Peter Grant – executive production
- Barrington Colby M.O.M. – The Hermit illustration
- Keith Morris – photography
- Graphreaks – design coordination

== Charts ==
=== Weekly charts ===
2026 weekly chart performance
Chart (1971–1972)	Peak position
Australian albums (Kent Music Report)	2
Canada Top Albums/CDs (RPM)	1
Danish Albums (Hitlisten)	21
Dutch Albums (Album Top 100)	7
Finnish Albums (The Official Finnish Charts)	7
German Albums (Offizielle Top 100)	5
Italian Albums (Musica e Dischi)	2
Japanese Albums (Oricon)	2
Norwegian Albums (VG-lista)	3
Spanish Albums Chart	8
UK Albums (Official Charts)	1
US Billboard 200	2

2014 weekly chart performance
Chart (2014)	Peak position
Australian Albums (ARIA)	21
Austrian Albums (Ö3 Austria)	12
Belgian Albums (Ultratop Flanders)	22
Belgian Albums (Ultratop Wallonia)	29
Danish Albums (Hitlisten)	21
Finnish Albums (Suomen virallinen lista)	9
French Albums (SNEP)	14
Hungarian Albums (MAHASZ)	13
Italian Albums (FIMI)	13
New Zealand Albums (RMNZ)	7
Polish Albums (ZPAV)	18
Portuguese Albums (AFP)	9
Scottish Albums (Official Charts)	7
Swedish Albums (Sverigetopplistan)	8
Swiss Albums (Schweizer Hitparade)	18
UK Albums (Official Charts)	6
US Top Catalog Albums (Billboard)	1

2026 weekly chart performance
Chart (2026)	Peak position
Croatian International Albums (HDU)	20

=== Year-end charts ===
1971 year-end chart performance for Led Zeppelin IV
Chart (1971)	Position
Dutch Albums (Album Top 100)	55

1972 year-end chart performance for Led Zeppelin IV
Chart (1972)	Position
German Albums (Offizielle Top 100)	27

2002 year-end chart performance for Led Zeppelin IV
Chart (2002)	Position
Canadian Metal Albums (Nielsen SoundScan)	67

== Certifications ==
Certifications for the fourth Led Zeppelin album
Region	Certification	Certified units/sales
Argentina (CAPIF)	2× Platinum	120,000^{^}
Australia (ARIA)	9× Platinum	630,000^{^}
Brazil (Pro-Música Brasil)	Platinum	250,000^{‡}
Canada (Music Canada)	2× Diamond	2,000,000^{^}
Denmark (IFPI Danmark)	Gold	10,000^{‡}
France (SNEP)	2× Platinum	600,000^{*}
Germany (BVMI)	3× Gold	750,000^{^}
Italy (FIMI) sales since 2009	Platinum	50,000^{‡}
Japan (RIAJ)	Platinum	200,000^{^}
New Zealand (RMNZ)	7× Platinum	105,000^{^}
Norway (IFPI Norway)	Silver	20,000
Norway (IFPI Norway) reissue	2× Platinum	40,000^{‡}
South Africa (RISA)	Gold	150,000
Spain (Promusicae)	Platinum	100,000^{^}
Switzerland (IFPI Switzerland)	Platinum	50,000^{^}
United Kingdom (BPI)	6× Platinum	1,800,000^{^}
United States (RIAA)	24× Platinum	24,000,000^{‡}
Yugoslavia	—	52,958
^{*} Sales figures based on certification alone.^{^} Shipments figures based on certification alone.^{‡} Sales+streaming figures based on certification alone.
