= Rock and Roll (Led Zeppelin song) =

- West German picture sleeve

Single by Led Zeppelin

from the album Led Zeppelin IV
- B-side: "Four Sticks"
- Released: 21 February 1972 (US)
- Recorded: January–February 1971
- Studio: Rolling Stones Mobile, Headley Grange, Hampshire; Island, London
- Genre: Rock and roll; hard rock; blues rock
- Length: 3:40
- Label: Atlantic
- Songwriters: John Bonham; John Paul Jones; Jimmy Page; Robert Plant
- Producer: Jimmy Page

Led Zeppelin singles chronology
"Black Dog" (1971)	"Rock and Roll" (1972)	"Over the Hills and Far Away" (1973)

"Rock and Roll" is a song by the English rock band Led Zeppelin, released as the second track on their fourth studio album in 1971. The song contains a guest performance by original Rolling Stones' pianist and co-founder Ian Stewart.

== Composition ==
The song is performed in the key of A major at a relatively fast tempo of 170 beats per minute. The main guitar riff performed by Jimmy Page has been described as "simple but incredibly effective" which "[leaves] space for Jones, and especially, the powerhouse drumming of Bonham to drive things along." The opening riff is double-tracked in stereo audio. A third, more distorted guitar track is panned to the centre, contrasting Page's main guitar tracks with counter-chords. A fourth guitar track adds "rock & roll licks." The song also utilizes piano tracks performed by Ian Stewart.

== Background and recording ==
According to guitarist Jimmy Page, "Rock and Roll" developed from a spontaneous jam session that occurred after the band became frustrated while attempting to finish recording "Four Sticks" at the Headley Grange mansion they had rented in Hampshire, England. During a break, John Bonham began playing the drum intro to the 1957 song "Keep A-Knockin'" by Little Richard, to which Page added a Chuck Berry-style guitar riff. The rest of the band members reportedly joined in "one by one." Ian Stewart was also present at the session performing piano. Realizing the potential in the new idea, the band immediately put "Four Sticks" on the "back burner." The tapes were rolling, and after improvising the first section of the song, the basis of the rest of the song was completed in around fifteen minutes.

== Reception ==
In 1972, American music critic and journalist Robert Christgau called it "simply the most dynamic hard-rock song in the music." Cash Box described it as a "rip-apart performance of one of best r&r revivalist tunes ever." In 2019, Rolling Stone ranked the song number 9 on its list of the 40 greatest Led Zeppelin songs.

== Live performance ==
"Rock and Roll" was a key component of the band's setlist at Led Zeppelin concerts from 1971 on. Initially, Plant referred to it on stage as "It's Been A Long Time", which is the opening lyric line of the song. In 1972, it was elevated to the opening number of all concert performances and it retained this status until 1975. For the band's 1977 North American tour, it became part of a medley encore with "Whole Lotta Love", and during 1979 and 1980 it became an encore in its own right.

Plant's vocal melodies on the track were so high that he often had to alter the melodies during live performances that he could manage more easily.

== Cadillac advertising ==
In 2002, "Rock and Roll" became the first Led Zeppelin song to be licensed for commercial use, when American car maker Cadillac featured it in television advertising. Plant commented:

I think that's appropriate ... I don't know how people view it, but as far as a young generation goes, if you hear that music in as many possible places as you can outside of the normal home for it, then it can only be a good thing.

As well as earning Led Zeppelin a large licensing fee, the advertising campaign increased Cadillac sales by 16 percent in 2002.

== Charts ==
Weekly chart performance for "Rock and Roll"
Chart (1972)	Peak position
Australia (Kent Music Report)	51
Canada Top Singles (RPM)	38
US Billboard Hot 100	47
US Cash Box	42
US Record World	38
West Germany (GfK)	13

== Certifications ==
Certifications and sales for "Rock and Roll"
Region	Certification	Certified units/sales
United Kingdom (BPI)	Silver	200,000^{‡}
^{‡} Sales+streaming figures based on certification alone.

== Accolades ==
List of accolades
Publication	Country	Accolade	Year	Rank
Dave Marsh	US	"The 1001 Greatest Singles Ever Made"	1989	424
Rock and Roll Hall of Fame	US	"The Rock and Roll Hall of Fame's 500 Songs that Shaped Rock and Roll"	1994	*
Radio Caroline	UK	"Top 500 Tracks"	1999	21
VH1	US	"The 100 Greatest Rock Songs of All Time"	2000	66
Q	UK	"The 50 Most Exciting Tunes Ever.."	2002	17
Q	UK	"The 1001 Best Songs Ever"	2003	201

(*) designates unordered lists

== Personnel ==
According to Jean-Michel Guesdon and Philippe Margotin:

Led Zeppelin

- Robert Plant – vocals
- Jimmy Page – guitars
- John Paul Jones – bass
- John Bonham – drums

Additional musician

- Ian Stewart – piano

== See also ==
- List of cover versions of Led Zeppelin songs § Rock and Roll

== Bibliography ==
- Guesdon, Jean-Michel; Margotin, Philippe (2018). Led Zeppelin All the Songs: The Story Behind Every Track. Running Press. ISBN 978-0-316-448-67-3.
