= Black Dog (Led Zeppelin song) =

1971 single by Led Zeppelin

- French picture sleeve

Single by Led Zeppelin

from the album Led Zeppelin IV
- B-side: "Misty Mountain Hop"
- Released: 2 December 1971 (US)
- Recorded: December 1970 – February 1971
- Studio: Rolling Stones Mobile, Headley Grange, Hampshire; Island, London
- Genre: Hard rock; blues rock
- Length: 4:55
- Label: Atlantic
- Songwriters: John Paul Jones; Jimmy Page; Robert Plant
- Producer: Jimmy Page

Led Zeppelin singles chronology
"Immigrant Song" (1970)	"Black Dog" (1971)	"Rock and Roll" (1972)

"Black Dog" is a song by the English rock band Led Zeppelin. It is the first track on the band's untitled fourth album (1971), which has become one of the best-selling albums of all time. The song was released as a single and reached the charts in many countries. It is "one of the most instantly recognisable Zeppelin tracks", and was included in Rolling Stone's 500 Greatest Songs of All Time list (US), and ranked number one in Q magazine's (UK) "20 Greatest Guitar Tracks". The lyrics contain typical bluesman themes of lust, eroticism, and betrayal.

== Composition ==
"Black Dog" by Led Zeppelin

=== Themes ===
The title is a reference to a nameless black Labrador Retriever the band used to see wandering the Headley Grange studio grounds. The dog would disappear in the evening and return exhausted in the early morning, before resting all day and repeating his evening sojourns. Robert Plant believed the lab was spending nights with his "old lady" (dog). Likewise, the lyrics are narrated by a man obsessed with a woman, "got a flaming heart can't get my fill", he "can't keep away" from her "honey drip"; (Note: The term "honeydripper" is black slang for the vagina ie. a female lover; it can also mean a male lover who says ("drips") sweet things to his female lover.) (Note: The lyric, "Watch your honey drip, can't keep away", may have influenced Plant in naming his 1980s band, The Honeydrippers; other theories are given, see that article for details.) she reveals her true intention, spending his money, taking his car, "telling her friends she's gonna be a star", at which point the deception becomes clear and he turns cold, saying "a big-legged woman ain't got no soul". The story of lust, eroticism, and ultimately betrayal echoes the traditional reputation of the blues as being the music of the devil, alluded to in the lyric "eyes that shine a burning red". (Note: The close association of the blues with the devil was well known between the 1920s and 1960s, but has largely faded from popular memory since then. See Gussow 2017, p. 2)

=== Music ===
The song opens with muted sounds of guitars warming up in the background, an idea by Jimmy Page, who also made curious opening sounds in "Immigrant Song" and "Friends"; he was fond of starting songs in an unexpected way. The sounds are actually recordings of various guitar track openings played simultaneously, creating a "sonic collage" in which the tape can be heard spinning up to speed. Robert Plant then begins singing in a high, strong voice, "hey, hey, mama" unaccompanied by music (a cappella). This sets the structure of the song, around a call and response dynamic, between the vocalist and the band, back and forth. Starting and stopping the music was Jimmy Page's idea, and he was inspired by Fleetwood Mac's 1969 song "Oh Well".

Bassist John Paul Jones, who is credited with writing the main riff, said he was inspired by Muddy Waters' 1968 album Electric Mud. However he retracted this, in 2007, saying that he was confused, and that his main inspiration was actually The Howlin' Wolf Album by Howlin' Wolf, particularly the repeating riff in "Smokestack Lightning", which Jones and Page sped up.

Jones added complex rhythm changes, that biographer Keith Shadwick describes as a "clever pattern that turns back on itself more than once, crossing between time signatures as it does." The group had a difficult time with the turnaround, but drummer John Bonham's solution was to play it straight through as if there was no turnaround. As Jean-Michel Guesdon notes, the recording contains rhythmic coordination errors, such as between 0:41 and 0:47, when the guitars are not in sync with the drums. He says it was part of the band's "genius" to discount these "errors" as "curiosities", i.e., characteristic signatures of the song. In live performances, Bonham eliminated the 5/4 variation so that Robert Plant could perform his a cappella vocal interludes and then have the instruments return at the proper time.

For his guitar parts, Jimmy Page used a Gibson Les Paul and made a complicated series of overdubs through various compressors and other equipment. This caused so much distortion, Page later said it sounded like an analog synthesizer.

== Recordings and releases ==
The initial backing tracks of "Black Dog" were recorded on 5 December 1970 at Island Studios on Basing Street in London, with recording engineer Andy Johns. It was the band's first recording at Island Studios. Further tracks were made at Headley Grange (January 1971), and again at Island Studios (February 1971).

Although played at live concerts since March 1971, its first commercial release was on 8 November 1971, as track number one, side one of the album Led Zeppelin IV, which became one of the best-selling albums of all time.

The single followed about a month later, on 2 December 1971, in continental Europe, the United States (via Europe), and Australia. As was their practice, the United Kingdom did not receive the single. "Misty Mountain Hop" is on the B-side.

== Live performances ==
"Black Dog" became a staple of Led Zeppelin's live concert performances. It was first played live at Belfast's Ulster Hall on 5 March 1971, a concert which also featured the first live performance of "Stairway to Heaven". It was retained for each subsequent concert tour until 1973. In 1975, it was used as an encore medley with "Whole Lotta Love", but was hardly used on the band's 1977 US concert tour. It was recalled to the set for the Knebworth Festival 1979 and the 1980 Tour of Europe. For these final 1980 performances, Page introduced the song from stage. "Black Dog" was last performed at the Ahmet Ertegun Tribute Concert in 2007, during Led Zeppelin's headline set.

== Reception ==
In 2004, the song appeared on the Rolling Stone's 500 Greatest Songs of All Time list at number 294. In 2010, it was demoted to number 300. Music sociologist Deena Weinstein calls "Black Dog" "one of the most instantly recognisable Zeppelin tracks". In 2007, Q magazine polled an "all-star panel", who ranked "Black Dog" as number one in a list of the "20 Greatest Guitar Tracks".

Chuck Klosterman of Spin comments that the first 15 seconds of the song invent rap metal, a genre that did not emerge in earnest until the 1980s or 1990s, and over ten years before the next possible antecedent in Kiss' "All Hell's Breaking Loose" (1983). "Robert Plant informs a young lass that he intends to make her sweat and groove (not necessarily in that order)", Klosterman writes, "and his wise words require no riffing. Kid Rock—ten months old at the time—definitely saw a marketing opportunity."

Publication	Country	Accolade	Year	Rank
Classic Rock	United States	"The Top Fifty Classic Rock Songs of All Time"	1995	18
The Guitar	United States	"Riff of the Millennium"	1999	7
Q	United Kingdom	"1010 Songs You Must Own!"	2004	*
Rolling Stone	United States	"The 500 Greatest Songs of All Time"	2004	294
Blender	United States	"The Greatest Songs Ever!"	2005	*
Bruce Pollock	United States	"The 7,500 Most Important Songs of 1944–2000"	2005	*
Q	United Kingdom	"The 20 Greatest Guitar Tracks"	2007	1
Rolling Stone	United States	"The 500 Greatest Songs of All Time"	2010	300

* designates unordered lists.

== Charts and certifications ==
=== Original release ===
Chart (1971–1972)	Peak position
Australia (Go-Set National Top 40)	9
Australia (Kent Music Report)	10
Canada Top Singles (RPM)	11
Danish Singles Chart	5
Germany (GfK)	22
Japan (Oricon)	24
Netherlands (Dutch Top 40)	22
Netherlands (Single Top 100)	20
New Zealand (RIANZ)	10
Spanish Singles Chart	25
Switzerland (Schweizer Hitparade)	6
US Billboard Hot 100	15
US Cash Box	9
US Record World	10

=== Digital download ===
Chart (2007)	Peak position
Canadian (Canadian Digital Song Singles)	59
UK Singles (OCC)	119
US Billboard Hot Digital Songs	64

Note: The official UK Singles Chart incorporated legal downloads as of 17 April 2005.

=== Certifications ===
Region	Certification	Certified units/sales
United Kingdom (BPI)	Silver	200,000^{‡}
^{‡} Sales+streaming figures based on certification alone.

== Personnel ==
- Robert Plant – vocals
- Jimmy Page – guitars
- John Paul Jones – bass
- John Bonham – drums

== See also ==
- List of cover versions of Led Zeppelin songs
- List of Led Zeppelin songs written or inspired by others

== Notes ==
Notes

Citations

References

- Bream, Jon (2010) [2008]. Whole Lotta Led Zeppelin: The Illustrated History of the Heaviest Band of All Time. Voyageur Press. ISBN 978-0-7603-3955-8.
- Crowe, Cameron (1993). The Complete Studio Recordings (Boxed set booklet). Led Zeppelin. New York City: Atlantic Records. OCLC 29660775. 82526-2.
- Fast, Susan (2001). In the Houses of the Holy: Led Zeppelin and the Power of Rock Music. Oxford University Press. ISBN 978-0-19-511756-1.
- Gracyk, Theodore (2007). Listening to Popular Music, Or, How I Learned to Stop Worrying and Love Led Zeppelin. Ann Arbor, Michigan: University of Michigan Press. ISBN 978-0-472-06983-5.
- Guesdon, Jean-Michael; Margotin, Philippe (2018). Led Zeppelin, All the Songs: The Story Behind Every Track. New York: Black Dog & Leventhal Publishers.
- Gussow, Adam (2017). Beyond the Crossroads: The Devil and the Blues Tradition. The University of North Carolina Press.
- Lewis, Dave (1994). Led Zeppelin: The Complete Guide to Their Music. London: Omnibus Press. ISBN 0-7119-3528-9.
- Shadwick, Keith (2005). Led Zeppelin: The Story of a Band and Their Music 1968–1980 (1st ed.). San Francisco: Backbeat Books. ISBN 0-87930-871-0.
- Schuman, Michael A. (2009). Led Zeppelin: Legendary Rock Band. Enslow Publishers. ISBN 978-0-7660-3026-8.
- Weinstein, Deena (1991). "Listener's Guide to Heavy Metal". Heavy Metal: A Cultural Sociology. New York City: Rowman & Littlefield. ISBN 0-669-21837-5.
