= Jimmy Page =

English guitarist (born 1944)

Jimmy Page OBE
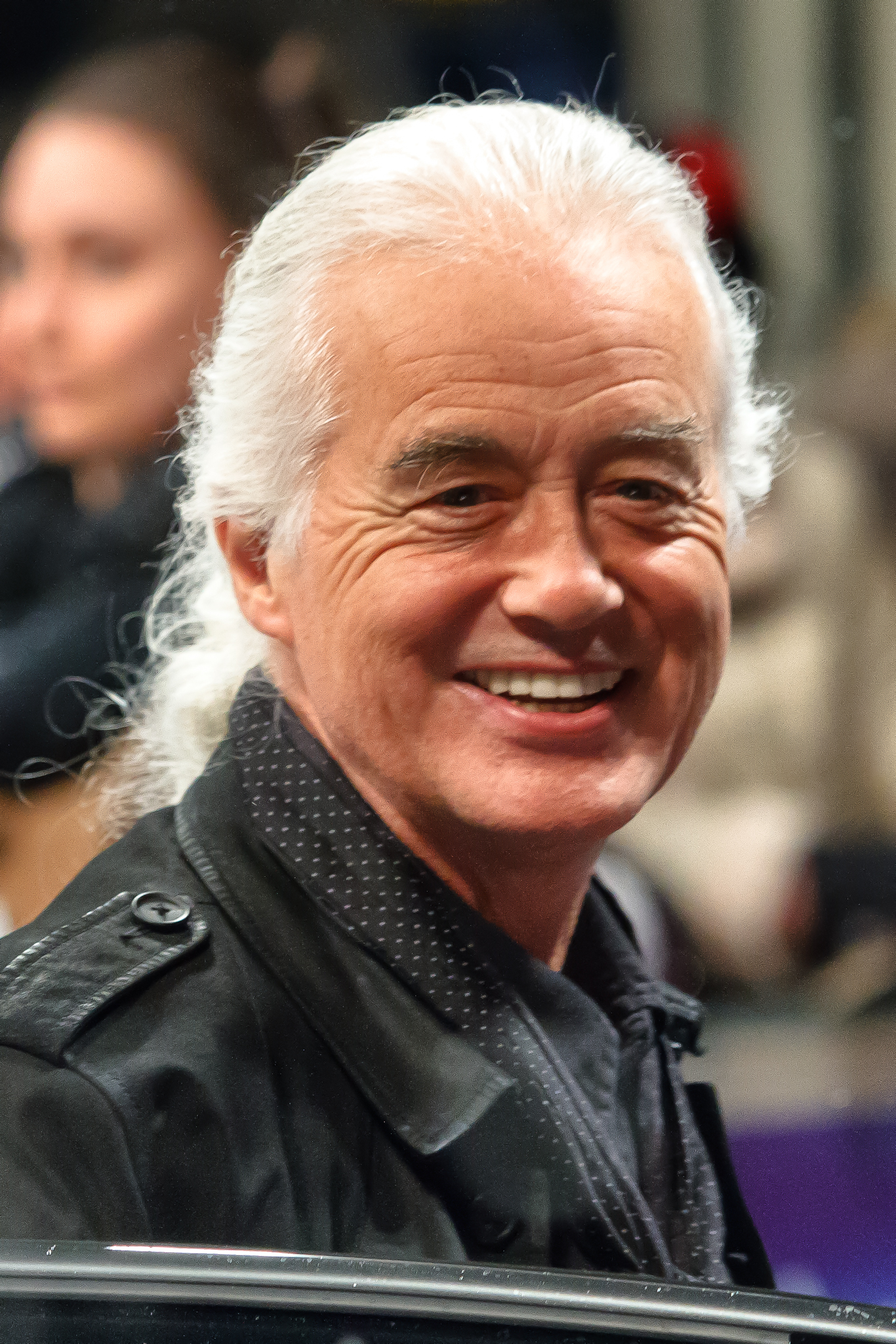
- Page in 2013
- Born: James Patrick Page; 9 January 1944 (age 82); Heston, Middlesex, England
- Occupations: Musician; record producer; songwriter
- Years active: 1957–present
- Spouses: Patricia Ecker (m. 1986; div. 1995); Jimena Gomez Paratcha (m. 1995; div. 2008)
- Partner: Scarlett Sabet (2014–present)
- Children: 5, including Scarlet
- Musical career
- Genres: Rock; blues; folk; hard rock; heavy metal
- Instrument: Guitar
- Labels: Atlantic; Swan Song; Geffen
- Formerly of: The Yardbirds; Led Zeppelin; The Firm; Coverdale–Page; Page and Plant
- Website: jimmypage.com

James Patrick Page (born 9 January 1944) is an English musician and producer who achieved international success as the guitarist and founder of the rock band Led Zeppelin.

Page began his career as a studio session musician in London and, by the mid-1960s, was a notable session guitarist in Britain. He was a member of the Yardbirds from 1966 to 1968. When the Yardbirds broke up, he founded Led Zeppelin, which was active from 1968 to 1980.

Following the death of Led Zeppelin drummer John Bonham in 1980, Page played with XYZ, the Firm, the Honeydrippers, Coverdale–Page, and Page and Plant. Page performed with many artists, both live and in studio recordings, and in a 2007 Led Zeppelin reunion that was released as the 2012 concert film Celebration Day. Along with the Edge and Jack White, he participated in the 2008 documentary It Might Get Loud.

Page is considered to be one of the greatest and most influential guitarists of all time. Rolling Stone magazine has described Page as "the pontiff of power riffing" and ranked him No. 3 on its 2015 list of the "100 Greatest Guitarists of All Time", behind Jimi Hendrix and Eric Clapton, and No. 3 again in 2023 behind Chuck Berry and Jimi Hendrix. In 2010, Page was ranked No. 2 on Gibson's list of "Top 50 Guitarists of All Time" and, in 2007, No. 4 on Classic Rock's "100 Wildest Guitar Heroes". He was inducted into the Rock and Roll Hall of Fame twice: once as a member of the Yardbirds (1992) and once as a member of Led Zeppelin (1995).

== Early life ==
Page was born to James Patrick Page and Patricia Elizabeth Gaffikin in the West London suburb of Heston on 9 January 1944. His father was a personnel manager at a plastic-coatings plant, and his mother, who was of Irish descent, was a doctor's secretary. In 1952, they moved to Feltham and then to Miles Road, Epsom, in Surrey. Page was educated from the age of eight at Epsom County Pound Lane Primary School, and at age eleven attended Ewell County Secondary School in West Ewell. He came across his first guitar, a Spanish guitar, in the Miles Road house: "I don't know whether [the guitar] was left behind by the people before [us], or whether it was a friend of the family's—nobody seemed to know why it was there." First playing the instrument when age 12, he took a few lessons in nearby Kingston, but was largely self-taught:

When I grew up there weren't many other guitarists ... There was one other guitarist in my school who actually showed me the first chords that I learned and I went on from there. I was bored so I taught myself the guitar from listening to records. So obviously it was a very personal thing.

This "other guitarist" was a boy named Rod Wyatt, a few years his senior. Together with another boy, Pete Calvert, they would practice at Page's house; Page would devote six or seven hours on some days to practicing and would always take his guitar with him to secondary school, only to have it confiscated and returned to him after class.

Among Page's early influences were rockabilly guitarists Scotty Moore and James Burton, who both played on recordings made by Elvis Presley. Presley's song "Baby Let's Play House" is cited by Page as his inspiration to take up the guitar, and he would reprise Moore's playing on the song in the live version of "Whole Lotta Love" on The Song Remains the Same.

Page appeared on BBC1 in 1957 with a Höfner President acoustic, which he'd bought from money saved up from his milk round in the summer holidays. The guitar had a pick-up so it could be amplified, but his first solid-bodied electric guitar was a second-hand 1959 Futurama Grazioso, later replaced by a Fender Telecaster. Page had seen Buddy Holly playing a Telecaster, and he had also played one at an electronics exhibition at Earls Court Exhibition Centre in London.

Page's musical tastes included skiffle, acoustic folk music, and the blues sounds of Elmore James, B.B. King, Otis Rush, Buddy Guy, Freddie King, and Hubert Sumlin. "Basically, that was the start: a mixture between rock and blues."

At age 13, Page appeared on Huw Wheldon's All Your Own talent quest program in a skiffle quartet, one performance of which aired on BBC1 in 1957. The group played "Mama Don't Want to Skiffle Anymore" and another American-flavored song, "In Them Ol' Cottonfields Back Home". When asked by Wheldon what he wanted to do after school, Page said, "I want to do biological research [to find a cure for] cancer, if it isn't discovered by then."

In an interview with Guitar Player magazine, Page stated that "there was a lot of busking in the early days, but as they say, I had to come to grips with it and it was a good schooling." When he was 14, and billed as James Page, he played in a group called Malcolm Austin and Whirlwinds, alongside Tony Busson on bass, Stuart Cockett on rhythm, and a drummer named Tom, playing Chuck Berry and Jerry Lee Lewis numbers. This band was short-lived, as Page soon began playing with Rod Wyatt, David Williams, and Pete Calvert. Page named the group The Paramounts, and they played gigs in Epsom, once supporting a group who later became Johnny Kidd & the Pirates.

Although interviewed for a job as a laboratory assistant, Page ultimately chose to leave secondary school in West Ewell to pursue music at age 15 – the earliest age permitted at the time. Page had gained four GCE O levels and had a major row with the school Deputy Head Miss Nicholson regarding his musical ambitions, about which she was scathing.

Page had difficulty finding other musicians with whom he could play on a regular basis. "It wasn't as though there was an abundance. I used to play in many groups... anyone who could get a gig together, really." Page had stints backing recitals by Beat poet Royston Ellis at the Mermaid Theatre between 1960 and 1961. He also played with singer Red E. Lewis' backing band the Redcaps after Lewis had seen Page play with the Paramounts. After the departure of guitarist Bobby Oats, Page was asked by singer Neil Christian to join his band, the Crusaders. Christian had seen 15-year-old Page playing in a local hall. Page toured with Christian for approximately two years and later played on several of his records, including the 1962 single, "The Road to Love".

During his stint with Christian, Page fell seriously ill with glandular fever and stopped touring. He put his musical career on hold and concentrated on his other love, painting, and he enrolled at Sutton Art College in Surrey. As he explained in 1975:

[I was] travelling around all the time in a bus. I did that for two years after I left school, to the point where I was starting to get really good bread. But I was getting ill. So I went back to art college. And that was a total change in direction. That's why I say it's possible to do. As dedicated as I was to playing the guitar, I knew doing it that way was doing me in forever. Every two months I had glandular fever. So for the next 18 months I was living on ten dollars a week and getting my strength up. But I was still playing.

== Career ==
=== Early 1960s: session musician ===
While a student, Page often performed at the Marquee Club with bands such as Cyril Davies' All Stars, Alexis Korner's Blues Incorporated, and fellow guitarists Jeff Beck and Eric Clapton. He was spotted one night by John Gibb of Brian Howard & the Silhouettes, who asked him to help record some singles for Columbia Graphophone Company, including "The Worrying Kind". Mike Leander of Decca Records first offered Page regular studio work. His first session for the label was the recording "Diamonds" by Jet Harris and Tony Meehan, which went to No. 1 on the singles chart in early 1963.

After brief stints with Carter-Lewis and the Southerners, Mike Hurst and the Method, and Mickey Finn and the Blue Men, Page undertook full-time session work. As a session guitarist, he was known as 'Lil' Jim Pea' to prevent confusion with the other noted English session guitarist Big Jim Sullivan. Page was mainly called into sessions as "insurance" in instances when a replacement or second guitarist was required by the recording artist. "It was usually myself and a drummer", he explained, "though they never mention the drummer these days, just me ... Anyone needing a guitarist either went to Big Jim [Sullivan] or myself." He stated that "In the initial stages they just said, play what you want, 'cause at that time I couldn't read music or anything."

She Just Satisfies
Sample of "She Just Satisfies", Page's first single (released in 1965).

Page was the favored session guitarist of record producer Shel Talmy. As a result, Page secured session work on songs for the Who and the Kinks. Page is credited with playing acoustic twelve-string guitar on two tracks on the Kinks' debut album, "I'm a Lover Not a Fighter" and "I've Been Driving on Bald Mountain", and possibly on the B-side "I Gotta Move". He played rhythm guitar on the sessions for the Who's first single "I Can't Explain" (although Pete Townshend was reluctant to allow Page's contribution on the final recording; Page also played lead guitar on the B-side, "Bald Headed Woman"). Page's studio gigs in 1964 and 1965 included Marianne Faithfull's "As Tears Go By", Jonathan King's "Everyone's Gone to the Moon", the Nashville Teens' "Tobacco Road", the Rolling Stones "Heart of Stone" (along with "We're Wasting Time"), Van Morrison & Them's "Baby, Please Don't Go", "Mystic Eyes", and "Here Comes the Night", Dave Berry's "The Crying Game" and "My Baby Left Me", Brenda Lee's "Is It True", Shirley Bassey's "Goldfinger", and Petula Clark's "Downtown".

In 1964, Page contributed guitar to the incidental music of the Beatles' 1964 film A Hard Day's Night.

In 1965, Page was hired by Rolling Stones manager Andrew Loog Oldham to act as house producer and A&R man for the newly formed Immediate Records label, which allowed him to play on and/or produce tracks by John Mayall, Nico, Chris Farlowe, Twice as Much, and Clapton. Also in 1965, Page produced one of Dana Gillespie's early singles, "Thank You Boy". Page also formed a brief songwriting partnership with then romantic interest Jackie DeShannon. He composed and recorded songs for the John Williams (not to be confused with the film composer John Williams) album The Maureeny Wishful Album with Big Jim Sullivan. Page worked as session musician on Donovan Leitch's Sunshine Superman, on Engelbert Humperdinck's Release Me, the Johnny Hallyday albums Jeune homme and Je suis né dans la rue, and the Al Stewart album Love Chronicles. Page also played guitar on five tracks of Joe Cocker's debut album, With a Little Help from My Friends. Since 1970, Page played lead guitar on ten Roy Harper tracks, comprising 81 minutes of music.

When questioned about which songs he played on, especially ones where there exists some controversy as to what his exact role was, Page often points out that it is hard to remember exactly what he did given the enormous number of sessions he was playing at the time. In a radio interview, he explained: "I was doing three sessions a day, fifteen sessions a week. Sometimes I would be playing with a group, sometimes I could be doing film music, it could be a folk session ... I was able to fit all these different roles."

Although Page recorded with many notable musicians, many of these early tracks are only available as bootleg recordings, several of which were released by the Led Zeppelin fan club in the late 1970s. Examples include early jam sessions featuring Page and guitarists Jeff Beck and Eric Clapton covering various blues themes, which were included on compilations released by Immediate Records. Several early tracks were compiled on the twin album release Jimmy Page: Session Man. Page also recorded with Keith Richards on guitar and vocals in Olympic Sound Studios on 15 October 1974. Along with Ric Grech on bass and Bruce Rowland on drums, a track called "Scarlet" was cut (the same year he played acoustic guitar on the Stones' "Through the Lonely Nights"). Page reflected later in an interview with Rolling Stone's Cameron Crowe: "I did what could possibly be the next Stones B side. It was Ric Grech, Keith, and me doing a number called "Scarlet". I can't remember the drummer. It sounded very similar in style and mood to those Blonde on Blonde tracks. It was great, really good. We stayed up all night and went down to Island Studios where Keith put some reggae guitars over one section. I just put some solos on it, but it was 8 in the morning of the next day before I did that. He took the tapes to Switzerland and someone found out about them. Richards told people that it was a track from my album". "Scarlet" was eventually released as a single from the reissue of the 1973 Rolling Stones album Goats Head Soup in 2020.

Page left studio work when the increasing influence of Stax Records on popular music led to the greater incorporation of brass and orchestral arrangements into recordings at the expense of guitars. He stated that his time as a session player served as extremely good schooling:

My session work was invaluable. At one point I was playing at least three sessions a day, six days a week! And I rarely ever knew in advance what I was going to be playing. But I learned things even on my worst sessions – and believe me, I played on some horrendous things. I finally called it quits after I started getting calls to do Muzak. I decided I couldn't live that life any more; it was getting too silly. I guess it was destiny that a week after I quit doing sessions Paul Samwell-Smith left the Yardbirds and I was able to take his place. But being a session musician was good fun in the beginning – the studio discipline was great. They'd just count the song off and you couldn't make any mistakes.

=== Late 1960s: The Yardbirds ===
In late 1964, Page was approached about the possibility of replacing Eric Clapton in the Yardbirds, but he declined out of loyalty to his friend. In February 1965, Clapton quit the Yardbirds and Page was formally offered his spot, but unwilling to give up his lucrative career as a session musician and worried about his health under touring conditions, he suggested his friend Jeff Beck. On 16 May 1966, drummer Keith Moon, bass player John Paul Jones, keyboardist Nicky Hopkins, Jeff Beck, and Page recorded "Beck's Bolero" at London's IBC Studios. The experience gave Page the idea to form a new supergroup featuring Beck, along with The Who's John Entwistle on bass and Moon on drums. However, the lack of a quality vocalist and contractual problems prevented the project from getting off the ground. During this time, Moon suggested the name "Lead Zeppelin" for the first time, after Entwistle commented that the proceedings would take to the air like a lead balloon.

Within weeks, Page attended a Yardbirds concert at Oxford. After the show, he went backstage where Paul Samwell-Smith announced that he was leaving the group. Page offered to replace Samwell-Smith, and this was accepted by the group. He initially played electric bass with the Yardbirds before finally switching to twin lead guitar with Beck when Chris Dreja moved to bass. The musical potential of the line-up was scuttled, however, by interpersonal conflicts caused by constant touring and a lack of commercial success, although they released one single, "Happenings Ten Years Time Ago". While Page and Beck played together in the Yardbirds, the trio of Page, Beck, and Clapton never played in the original group at the same time. The three guitarists did appear on stage together at the ARMS Charity Concerts in 1983.

After Beck's departure, the Yardbirds remained a quartet. They recorded one album with Page on lead guitar, Little Games. The album received indifferent reviews and was not a commercial success, peaking at No. 80 on the Billboard 200. Although their studio sound was fairly commercial at the time, the band's live performances were just the opposite, becoming heavier and more experimental. These concerts featured musical aspects that Page would later perfect with Led Zeppelin, most notably in performances of "Dazed and Confused".

After the departure of Keith Relf and Jim McCarty in 1968, Page reconfigured the group with a new line-up to fulfill unfinished tour dates in Scandinavia. To this end, Page recruited vocalist Robert Plant and drummer John Bonham, and he was also contacted by John Paul Jones, who asked to join. During the Scandinavian tour, the new group appeared as the New Yardbirds, but soon recalled the old joke by Keith Moon and John Entwistle. Page stuck with that name to use for his new band. Manager Peter Grant changed it to "Led Zeppelin", to avoid a mispronunciation as "Leed Zeppelin".

=== 1968–1980: Led Zeppelin ===
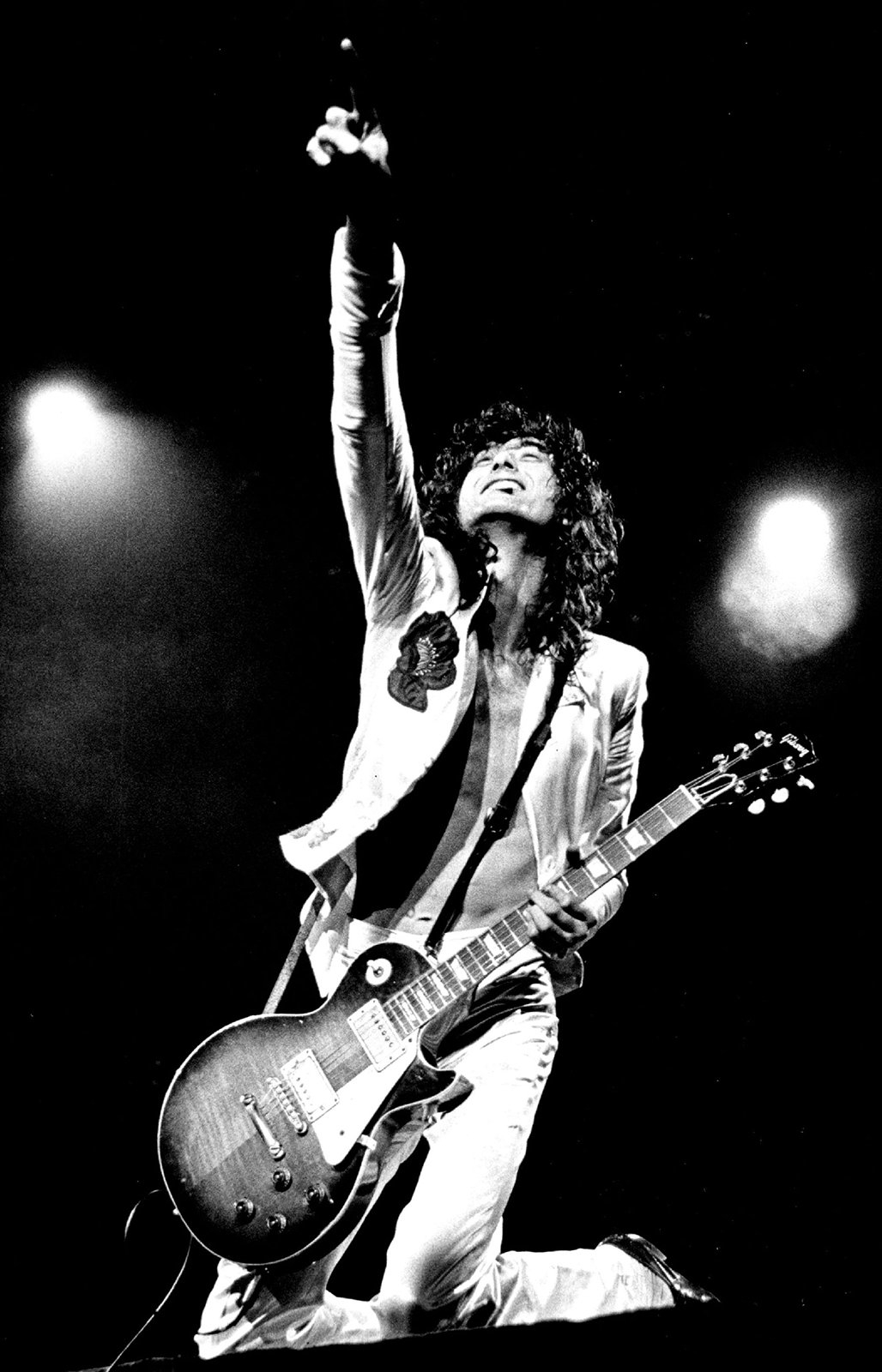
Jimmy Page performing onstage in 1977

Jimmy Page's sigil from Led Zeppelin IV

Page explained that he had a very specific idea in mind as to what he wanted Led Zeppelin to be, from the very beginning:

I had a lot of ideas from my days with the Yardbirds. The Yardbirds allowed me to improvise a lot in live performance and I started building a textbook of ideas that I eventually used in Zeppelin. In addition to those ideas, I wanted to add acoustic textures. Ultimately, I wanted Zeppelin to be a marriage of blues, hard rock, and acoustic music topped with heavy choruses – a combination that had never been done before. Lots of light and shade in the music.

Led Zeppelin became one of the best-selling music groups in the history of audio recording. Various sources estimate the group's worldwide sales at more than 200 or even 300 million albums. With 111.5 million RIAA-certified units, they are the second-best-selling band in the United States. Each of their nine studio albums reached the Top 10 of the US Billboard album chart, and six reached the No. 1 spot.

Led Zeppelin were progenitors of heavy metal and hard rock. They performed on multiple record-breaking concert tours that earned them a reputation for excess. Although they remained commercially and critically successful, in the later 1970s, the band's output and touring schedule were limited by the members' personal difficulties. The band broke up in 1980 after Bonham died at Page's home. For some time, Page refused to touch a guitar, grieving for his friend.

=== 1980s ===
Page made a return to the stage at a Jeff Beck show in March 1981 at the Hammersmith Odeon. Also in 1981, Page joined with Yes bassist Chris Squire and drummer Alan White to form a supergroup called XYZ (for former Yes-Zeppelin). They rehearsed several times, but the project was shelved. Bootlegs of these sessions revealed that some of the material emerged on later projects, notably The Firm's "Fortune Hunter" and Yes songs "Mind Drive" and "Can You Imagine?". Page joined Yes on stage in 1984 at Westfalenhalle in Dortmund, Germany, playing "I'm Down".

In 1982, Page collaborated with director Michael Winner to record the Death Wish II soundtrack. This and several subsequent Page recordings, including the Death Wish III soundtrack, were recorded and produced at his recording studio, The Sol in Cookham, which he had purchased from Gus Dudgeon in the early 1980s.

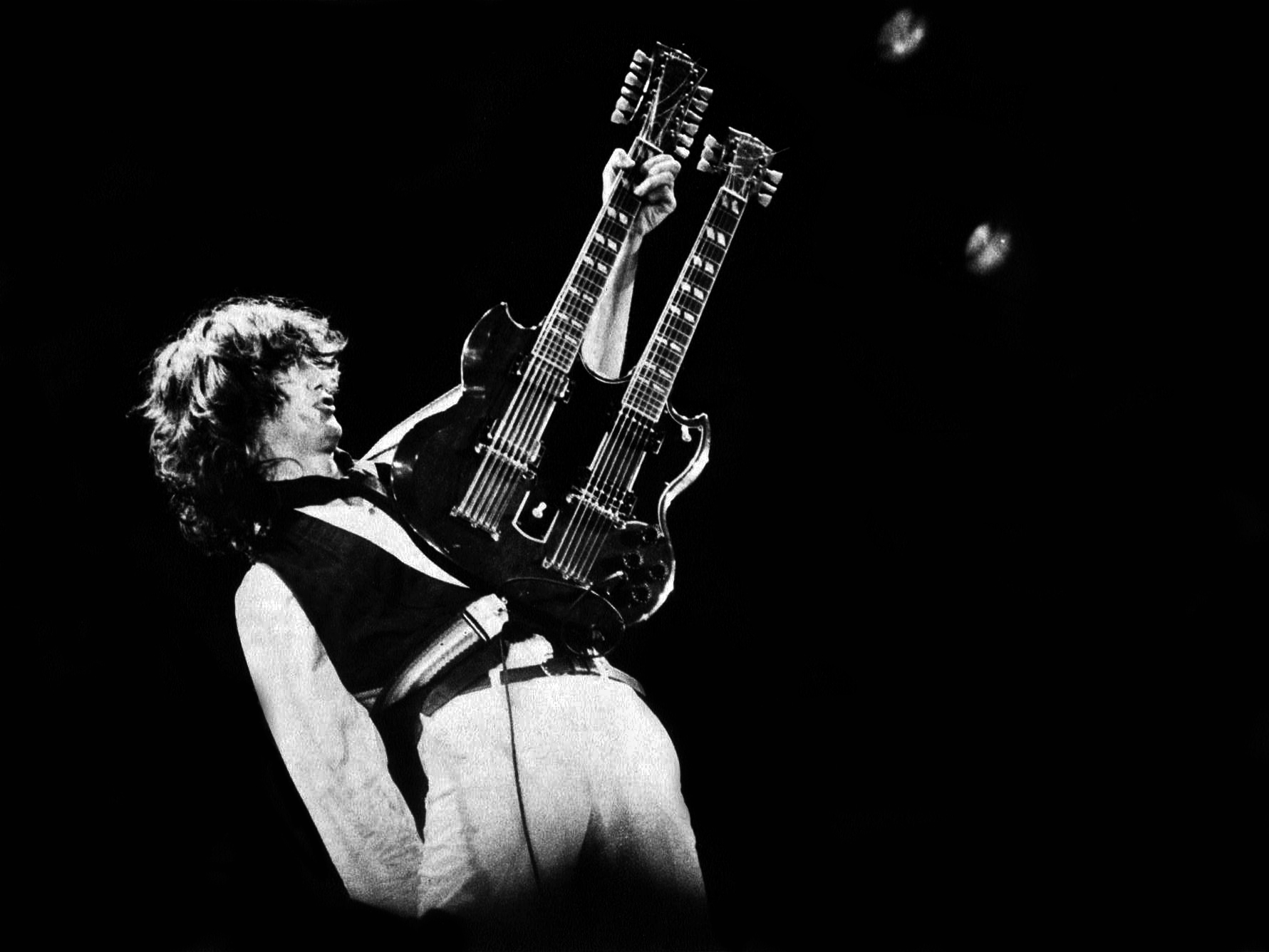
Page performing at an ARMS Charity Concert in 1983

In 1983, Page appeared with the A.R.M.S. (Action Research for Multiple Sclerosis) charity series of concerts that honoured Small Faces bassist Ronnie Lane, who suffered from the disease. For the first shows at the Royal Albert Hall in London, Page's set consisted of songs from the Death Wish II soundtrack (with Steve Winwood on vocals) and an instrumental version of "Stairway to Heaven". A four-city tour of the United States followed, with Paul Rodgers of Bad Company replacing Winwood. During the tour, Page and Rodgers performed "Midnight Moonlight", which would later appear on The Firm's first album. All of the shows featured an on stage jam of "Layla" that reunited Page with Beck and Clapton. According to the book Hammer of the Gods, it was reportedly around this time that Page told friends that he had just ended seven years of heroin use. On 13 December 1983, Page joined Plant on stage for one encore at the Hammersmith Odeon in London.

Page next linked up with Roy Harper for the 1984 album Whatever Happened to Jugula? and occasional concerts, performing a predominantly acoustic set at folk festivals under various guises such as the MacGregors and Themselves. Also in 1984, Page recorded with Plant as the Honeydrippers the album The Honeydrippers: Volume 1 and with John Paul Jones on the film soundtrack Scream for Help.

Page subsequently collaborated with Rodgers on two albums under the name The Firm. The first album, released in 1985, was the self-titled The Firm. Popular songs included "Radioactive" and "Satisfaction Guaranteed". The album peaked at number 17 on the Billboard pop albums chart and went gold in the US. It was followed by Mean Business in 1986. The band toured in support of both albums, but soon split up.

Various other projects followed, such as session work for Graham Nash, Stephen Stills, and the Rolling Stones (on their 1986 single "One Hit (To the Body)"). In 1986, Page reunited temporarily with his former Yardbirds bandmates to play on several tracks of the Box of Frogs album Strange Land. Page released a solo album entitled Outrider in 1988, which featured contributions from Plant, with Page contributing in turn to Plant's solo album Now and Zen, which was released the same year. Outrider also featured singer John Miles on the album's opening track "Wasting My Time".

Throughout these years, Page also reunited with the other former bandmates of Led Zeppelin to perform live on a few occasions, most notably in 1985 for the Live Aid concert with both Phil Collins and Tony Thompson filling drum duties. However, the band members considered this performance to be sub-standard, with Page having been let down by a poorly tuned Les Paul. Page, Plant, and Jones, as well as John Bonham's son Jason, performed at the Atlantic Records 40th Anniversary show on 14 May 1988, closing the 12-hour show.

=== 1990s: Coverdale–Page, Page, and Plant ===
In 1990, a Knebworth concert to aid the Nordoff-Robbins Music Therapy Centre and the British School for Performing Arts and Technology saw Plant unexpectedly joined by Page to perform "Misty Mountain Hop", "Wearing and Tearing", and "Rock and Roll". The same year, Page appeared with Aerosmith at the Monsters of Rock festival. Page also performed with the band's former members at Jason Bonham's wedding. In 1993, Page collaborated with David Coverdale (of English rock band Whitesnake) for the album Coverdale–Page and a brief tour of Japan.

In 1994, Page and Robert Plant reunited as Page and Plant for an initial performance as part of MTV's "Unplugged" series. The 90-minute special, dubbed Unledded, premiered to the highest ratings in MTV's history. In October of the same year, the session was released as the live album No Quarter: Jimmy Page and Robert Plant Unledded, and on DVD as No Quarter Unledded in 2004. Following a highly successful mid-1990s tour to support No Quarter, Page and Plant recorded 1998's Walking into Clarksdale, featuring the Grammy Award-winning songs "Most High" and "Please Read the Letter".

Page was heavily involved in remastering the Led Zeppelin catalogue. He participated in various charity concerts and charity work, particularly the Action for Brazil's Children Trust (ABC Trust), founded by his wife Jimena Gomez-Paratcha in 1998.

In the same year, Page played guitar for rap singer/producer Puff Daddy's song "Come with Me", which heavily samples Led Zeppelin's "Kashmir" and was included in the soundtrack of Godzilla. The two later performed the song on Saturday Night Live.

Following a benefit performance in the summer where the Black Crowes guested with him, Page teamed up with the band for six shows in October 1999, playing material from the Led Zeppelin catalogue as well as blues and rock standards. The last two concerts were recorded in Los Angeles and released as a double live album, Live at the Greek in 2000.

=== 2000s ===
After the release of the live album, Page and the Black Crowes continued their collaboration by joining a package tour with the Who in 2000, but Page ultimately quit before completion of the tour.

In 2001, after guesting with Fred Durst and Wes Scantlin's performance of "Thank You" at the MTV Europe Video Music Awards, Page once again continued his collaboration with Robert Plant. After recording a cover of "My Bucket's Got a Hole in It" for a tribute album, the duo performed at the Montreux Jazz Festival.

In 2005, Page was appointed Officer of the Order of the British Empire (OBE) in recognition of his Brazilian charity work for Task Brazil and Action For Brazil's Children's Trust, made an honorary citizen of Rio de Janeiro later that year, and won a Grammy Lifetime Achievement Award with Led Zeppelin.

In November 2006, Led Zeppelin was inducted into the UK Music Hall of Fame. The television broadcast of the event consisted of an introduction to the band by various famous admirers (including Roger Taylor, Slash, Joe Perry, Steven Tyler, Jack White, and Tony Iommi), an award presentation to Page, and a short speech by him. After this, rock group Wolfmother played a tribute to Led Zeppelin. During an interview for the BBC in connection with the induction, Page expressed plans to record new material in 2007, saying: "It's an album that I really need to get out of my system ... there's a good album in there and it's ready to come out ... Also there will be some Zeppelin things on the horizon."

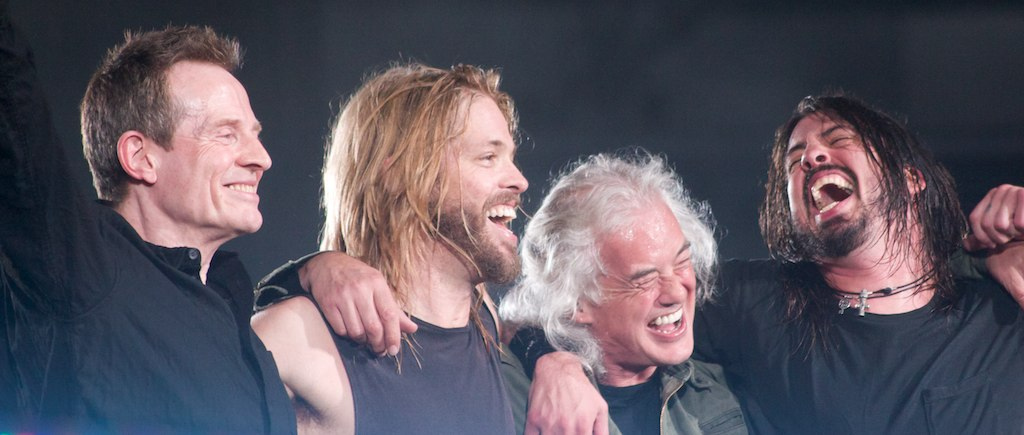
Page and Jones with Taylor Hawkins and Dave Grohl of the Foo Fighters

On 10 December 2007, the surviving members of Led Zeppelin and Jason Bonham played a charity concert at the O2 Arena London. According to Guinness World Records 2009, Led Zeppelin set the world record for the "Highest Demand for Tickets for One Music Concert" as 20 million requests for the reunion show were rendered online. On 7 June 2008, Page and John Paul Jones appeared with the Foo Fighters to close the band's concert at Wembley Stadium, performing "Rock and Roll" and "Ramble On". On 20 June 2008, at a ceremony at Guildford Cathedral, Page was awarded an honorary doctorate from the University of Surrey. During the 2008 Summer Olympics, Page, David Beckham, and Leona Lewis represented Britain during the closing ceremonies on 24 August 2008. Beckham rode a double-decker bus into the stadium, and Page and Lewis performed "Whole Lotta Love".

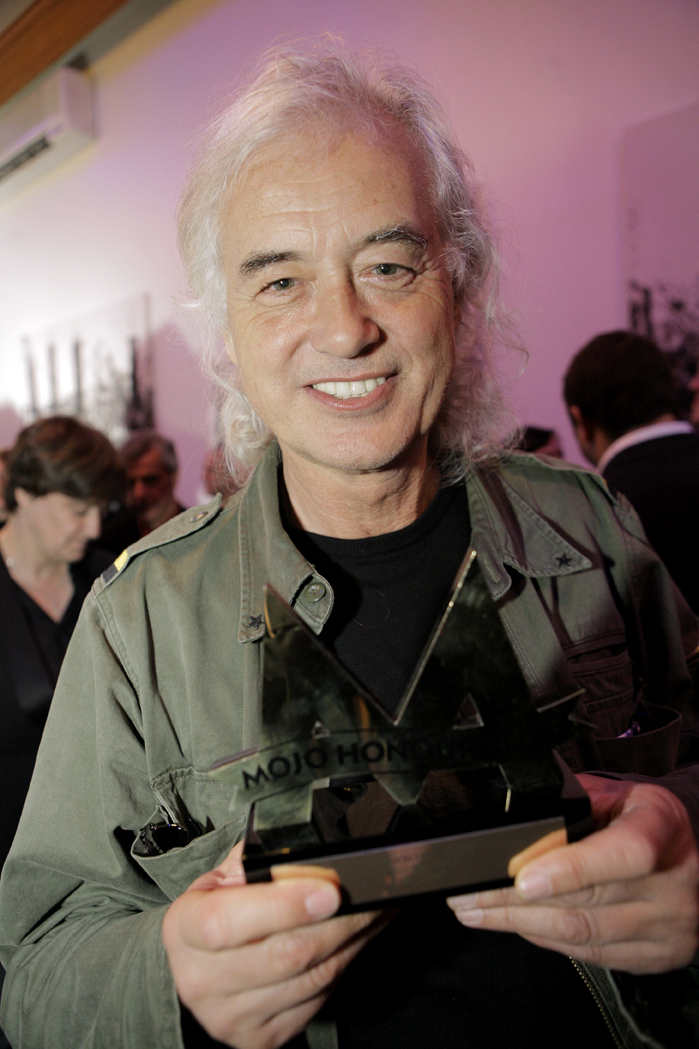
Page at the 2008 MOJO Awards in London with the Best Live Act award

In 2008, Page co-produced a documentary film directed by Davis Guggenheim titled It Might Get Loud. The film examines the history of the electric guitar and focuses on the careers and styles of Page, The Edge, and Jack White. The film premiered on 5 September 2008 at the Toronto International Film Festival. Page also participated in the three-part BBC documentary London Calling: The making of the Olympic handover ceremony on 4 March 2009. On 4 April 2009, Page inducted Jeff Beck into the Rock and Roll Hall of Fame. Page announced his 2010 solo tour while talking to Sky News on 16 December 2009.

=== 2010s ===
In January 2010, Page announced an autobiography published by Genesis Publications, in a hand-crafted, limited edition of 2,150 copies. Page was honored with a first Global Peace Award by the United Nations' Pathways to Peace organisation after confirming reports that he would be among the headliners at the Show of Peace Concert in Beijing on 10 October 2010.

On 3 June 2011, Page played with Donovan at the Royal Albert Hall in London. The concert was filmed. Page made an unannounced appearance with The Black Crowes at the Shepherd's Bush Empire in London on 13 July 2011. He also played alongside Roy Harper at Harper's 70th-birthday celebratory concert in London's Royal Festival Hall on 5 November 2011.

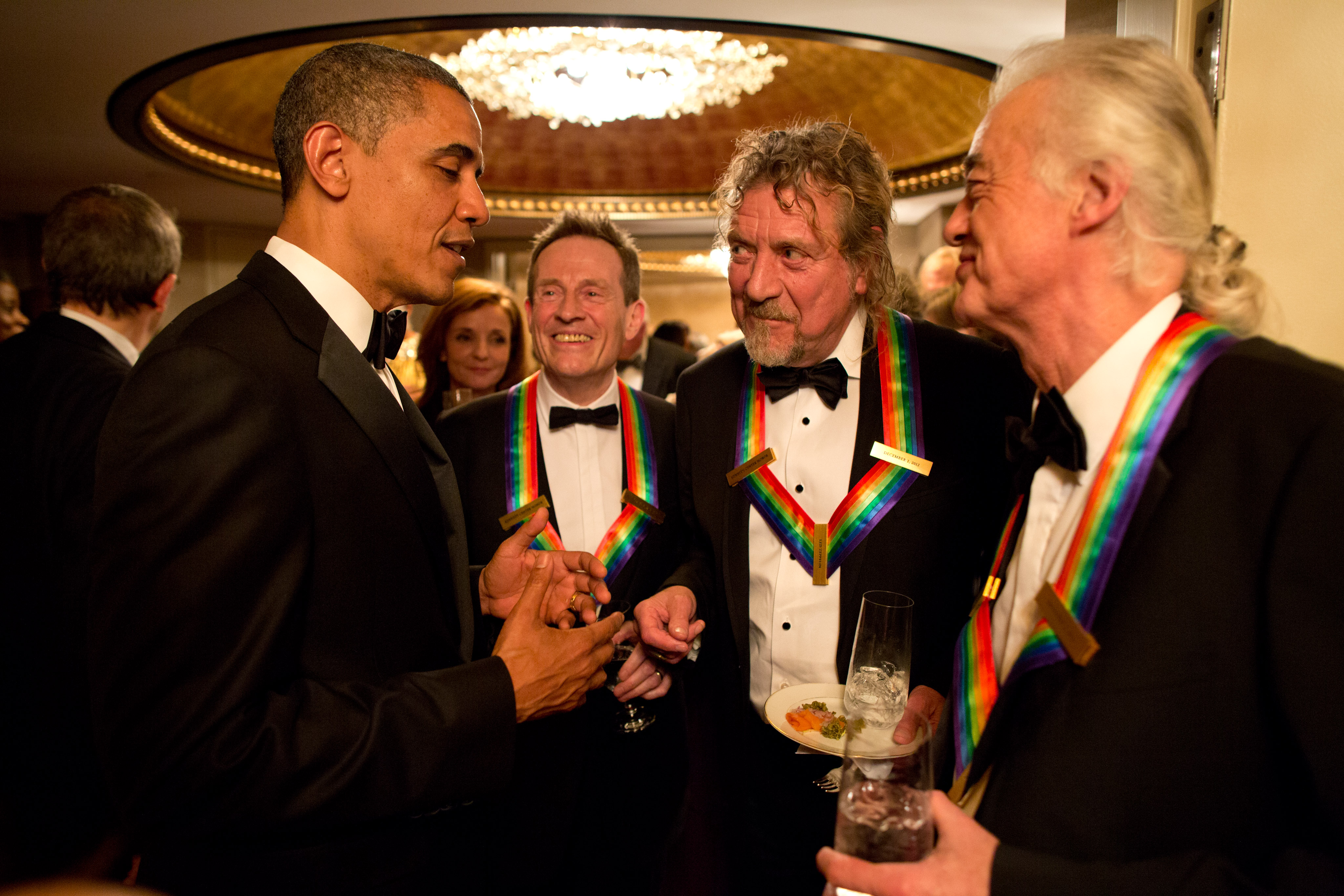
Page (right) with the other surviving members of Led Zeppelin, with US President Barack Obama at the 2012 Kennedy Center Honors

In November 2011, British Conservative MP Louise Mensch launched a campaign to have Page knighted for his contributions to the music industry. In December 2012, Page, along with Plant and Jones, received the annual Kennedy Center Honors from President Barack Obama in a White House ceremony. The honour is the US's highest award for those who have influenced American culture through the arts. In February 2013, Plant hinted that he was open to a Led Zeppelin reunion in 2014, stating that he was not the reason for the band's dormancy: "Jimmy Page and John Paul Jones are quite contained in their own worlds and leave it to [him]", adding that he is "not the bad guy" and that he has "got nothing to do in 2014".

In 2013, Page (with Led Zeppelin) was awarded a Grammy for "Best Rock Album" for Celebration Day.

In May 2014, Page was awarded an honorary doctorate by Berklee College of Music in Boston. In a spring 2014 interview with the BBC about the reissue of Led Zeppelin's first three albums, Page said he was confident that fans would be keen on another reunion show, but Plant later replied that "the chances of it happening [were] zero." Page then told The New York Times that he was "fed up" with Plant's refusal to play, stating "I was told last year that Robert Plant said he is doing nothing in 2014, and what do the other two guys think? Well, he knows what the other guys think. Everyone would love to play more concerts for the band. He's just playing games, and I'm fed up with it, to be honest with you. I don't sing, so I can't do much about it." Page added: "I definitely want to play live. Because, you know, I've still got a twinkle in my eye. I can still play. So, yeah, I'll just get myself into musical shape, just concentrating on the guitar."

In July 2014, an NME article revealed that Plant was "slightly disappointed and baffled" when Page declared he was "fed up" with Plant delaying Led Zeppelin reunion plans. Instead, Plant offered Led Zeppelin's guitarist to write acoustically together. Plant started he was interested in working with Page again but only in an unplugged way.

In December 2015, Page was featured in the two-hour long BBC Radio 2 program Johnny Walker Meets, a conversation with DJ Johnny Walker. In October 2017, Page spoke at the Oxford Union about his career in music.

=== 2020s ===
Page was among the people interviewed for the documentary film If These Walls Could Sing directed by Mary McCartney about the recording studios at Abbey Road Studios.

In September 2024, Page was honored by the Academy of Achievement at the British Embassy in Washington, D.C., hosted by British Ambassador Karen Pierce and the Permanent Secretary to the Treasury of United Kingdom, Charles Roxburgh. Page was honoured for more than five decades of making music and for his philanthropy.

In 2025, Page appeared in the musical documentary Becoming Led Zeppelin, directed by Bernard MacMahon and produced by Allison McGourty. The film chronicled Led Zeppelin's formation and first year and was the first time the band's members had agreed to participate in a biographical documentary.

Page is a member of the Golden Plate Awards Council.

== Legacy ==
Along with a highly original and well-rounded guitar style, influenced by blues, country, and international folk music, Jimmy Page has the grand distinction of being one of the most respected and influential songwriters and producers in the history of rock music.

— Chipkin, Stang in 2003

Page is considered by numerous major publications and musical peers as one of rock music's greatest and most influential guitarists. As a producer, songwriter, and guitarist, he helped make Led Zeppelin a prototype for countless bands and was one of the major driving forces behind the rock sound of that era, influencing a host of guitarists.

Dale Turner and Dave Rubin of Guitar Player call Page "one of rock music's ultimate riff masters, guitar orchestrators, and studio revolutionaries".

Guitarists influenced by Page include Eddie Van Halen, Ace Frehley, Joe Satriani, John Frusciante, Kirk Hammett, Joe Perry, Richie Sambora, Slash, Dave Mustaine, Mick Mars, Alex Lifeson, Steve Vai, Dan Hawkins, and Char, among others.

Queen's Brian May told Guitarist in 2004: "I don't think anyone has epitomised riff writing better than Jimmy Page—he's one of the great brains of rock music." "If Jimmy Page would play guitar with me," remarked Stevie Nicks, "I'd put a band around us tomorrow."

== Artistry ==
A riff will come out of.. this whole thing of do you practice at home and all that. Well, I play at home and before I knew where I was, things would be coming out and that's those little sections or riffs or whatever. At that stage it's selection and rejection. It's whether you continue with something or you go, 'No that's too much like something else,' and then you move into something else. If you've got an idea and you think that's quite interesting, then I'd work and build on it at home. "Rock and Roll" was something that came purely out of the ether.

— Page, on his creative process, as quoted by Daniel Rachel in The Art of Noise: Conversations with Great Songwriters (2014),

Page viewed himself as a composer first and foremost, and likened his compositional and structural styles to classical music. He described his approach to composing as "building up harmonies, orchestrating the guitar like an army". Prolific in creating guitar riffs, Page's style involves various alternative guitar tunings and melodic solos, coupled with aggressive, distorted guitar tones. It is also characterised by his folk and eastern-influenced acoustic work. He is notable for occasionally playing his guitar with a cello bow to add a droning sound texture to the music. His acoustic guitar playing style was described as unconventional, full of strange angles and unexpected shapes and changes. Rob Power of MusicRadar wrote, "It's almost unfair that one of the greatest electric warriors of all time, a riffmeister of repute and a rocker almost without parallel, also happened to be a brilliant and thoughtful acoustic player as well. Jimmy Page's musical magpie act and boundless virtuosity meant he was able to take almost any genre or style and bend it to his will."

Page's guitar playing style has been described as "extremely eclectic". His work with the Yardbirds and Led Zeppelin drew comparisons to the "wild abandon often associated with Jimi Hendrix, the passion and grit of a seasoned bluesman, and the sensitivity of a folk musician". Page's influences include blues and early rockabilly guitarists such as Otis Rush, Buddy Guy, Hubert Sumlin, Cliff Gallup and Scotty Moore. According to Guitar Player, "he combined these influences with a strong interest in the occult and plenty of his own studio savvy to paint a musical landscape" through the band's music.

Page came up with a great deal of material used in Led Zeppelin by tape-recording himself. He said, "I'd be expanding on an idea and then I'd go back and I'd review it. So a lot of it you can hear train wrecks as you're playing through the song—I'm just working and trying stuff. Then I'd come back, as you say, and extract what appeared to be the shining bits, if you like, as opposed to the bits, and then I'd lace them together. That's how the sequence of the song would arrive." He further explained, "I [would] just [be] experimenting on the guitar and I [would come] up with this thing and I [think], 'I'm not losing that!'"

=== Production techniques ===
Page is credited for innovations in sound recording, many of which came as a session musician:

This apprenticeship ... became a part of [learning] how things were recorded. I started to learn microphone placements and things like that, what did and what didn't work. I certainly knew what did and didn't work with drummers because they put drummers in these little sound booths that had no sound deflection at all and the drums would just sound awful. The reality of it is the drum is a musical instrument, it relies on having a bright room and a live room ... And so bit by bit I was learning really how not to record.

He developed a reputation for employing effects in new ways and trying out different methods of using microphones and amplification. During the late 1960s, most British music producers placed microphones directly in front of amplifiers and drums, resulting in the sometimes "tinny" sound of the recordings of the era. Page commented to Guitar World magazine that he felt the drum sounds of the day in particular "sounded like cardboard boxes". Instead, Page was a fan of 1950s recording techniques, with Sun Studio a particular favourite. In the same Guitar World interview, Page remarked: "Recording used to be a science" and "[engineers] used to have a maxim: distance equals depth." Taking this maxim to heart, Page developed the idea of placing an additional microphone some distance from the amplifier (as much as twenty feet) and then recording the balance between the two. By adopting this technique, Page became one of the first British producers to record a band's "ambient sound" – the distance of a note's time-lag from one end of a room to the other.

For certain Led Zeppelin tracks such as "Whole Lotta Love" and "You Shook Me", Page used "reverse echo", a technique he claims to have invented in 1967 while recording the single "Ten Little Indians". This technique involved hearing the echo before the main sound instead of after it, achieved by turning the tape over and employing the echo on a spare track, then turning the tape back over again to get the echo preceding the signal.

Page has said that, as producer, he deliberately changed the audio engineers on Led Zeppelin albums, from Glyn Johns for the first album, to Eddie Kramer for Led Zeppelin II, to Andy Johns for Led Zeppelin III and later albums. He explained: "I consciously kept changing engineers because I didn't want people to think that they were responsible for our sound. I wanted people to know it was me."

John Paul Jones acknowledged that Page's production techniques were a key component of the band's success:

The backwards echo stuff [and] a lot of the microphone techniques were just inspired. Using distance-miking ... and small amplifiers. Everybody thinks we go in the studio with huge walls of amplifiers, but Page doesn't. He uses a really small amplifier and he just mikes it up really well, so that it fits into a sonic picture.

In an interview that Page gave to Guitar World magazine in 1993, he remarked on his work as a producer:

Many people think of me as just a riff guitarist, but I think of myself in broader terms ... As a record producer I would like to be remembered as someone who was able to sustain a band of unquestionable individual talent and push it to the forefront during its working career. I think I really captured the best of our output, growth, change, and maturity on tape – the multifaceted gem that is Led Zeppelin.

== Equipment ==
=== Guitars ===
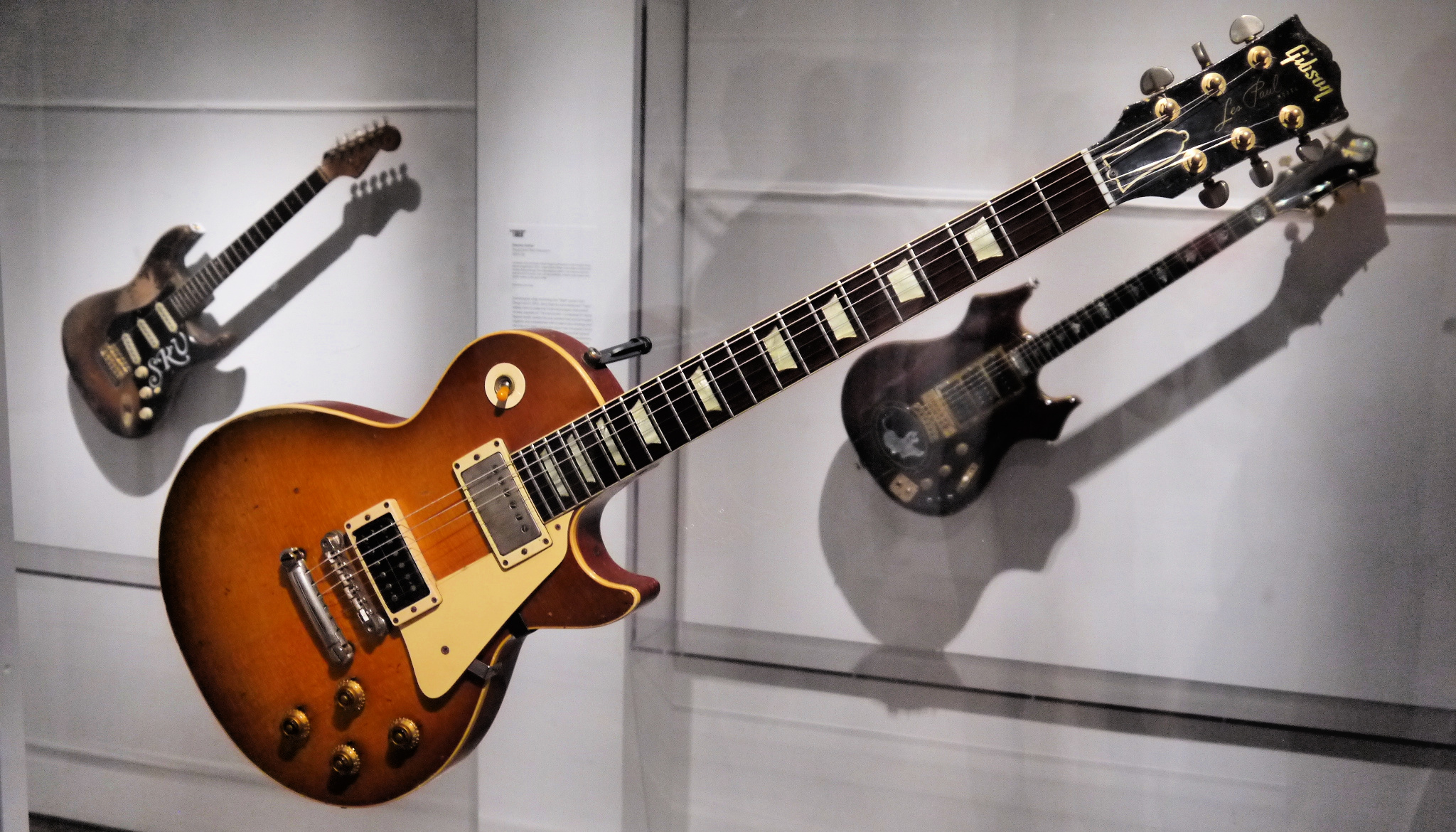
Page's "No. 1" Gibson Les Paul, used in every Led Zeppelin performance and album from 1970 onward

For the recording of most of Led Zeppelin material from the second album onward, Page used a Gibson Les Paul guitar (sold to him by Joe Walsh) with Marshall amplification. A Harmony Sovereign H-1260 was used in-studio on Led Zeppelin III and Led Zeppelin IV and on-stage from 5 March 1971 to 28 June 1972. During the studio sessions for Led Zeppelin and later for recording the guitar solo in "Stairway to Heaven", he used a Fender Telecaster (a gift from Jeff Beck). He also used a Danelectro 3021, tuned to DADGAD, most notably on live performances of "Kashmir".

Page also plays his guitar with a cello bow, as on the live versions of the songs "Dazed and Confused" and "How Many More Times", a technique he developed in his session days. On MTV's Led Zeppelin Rockumentary, Page said that the idea came from David McCallum, Sr. who was also a session musician. Page used his Fender Telecaster and later his Gibson Les Paul for his bow solos.

==== Notable guitars ====
===== 6-string electric guitars =====
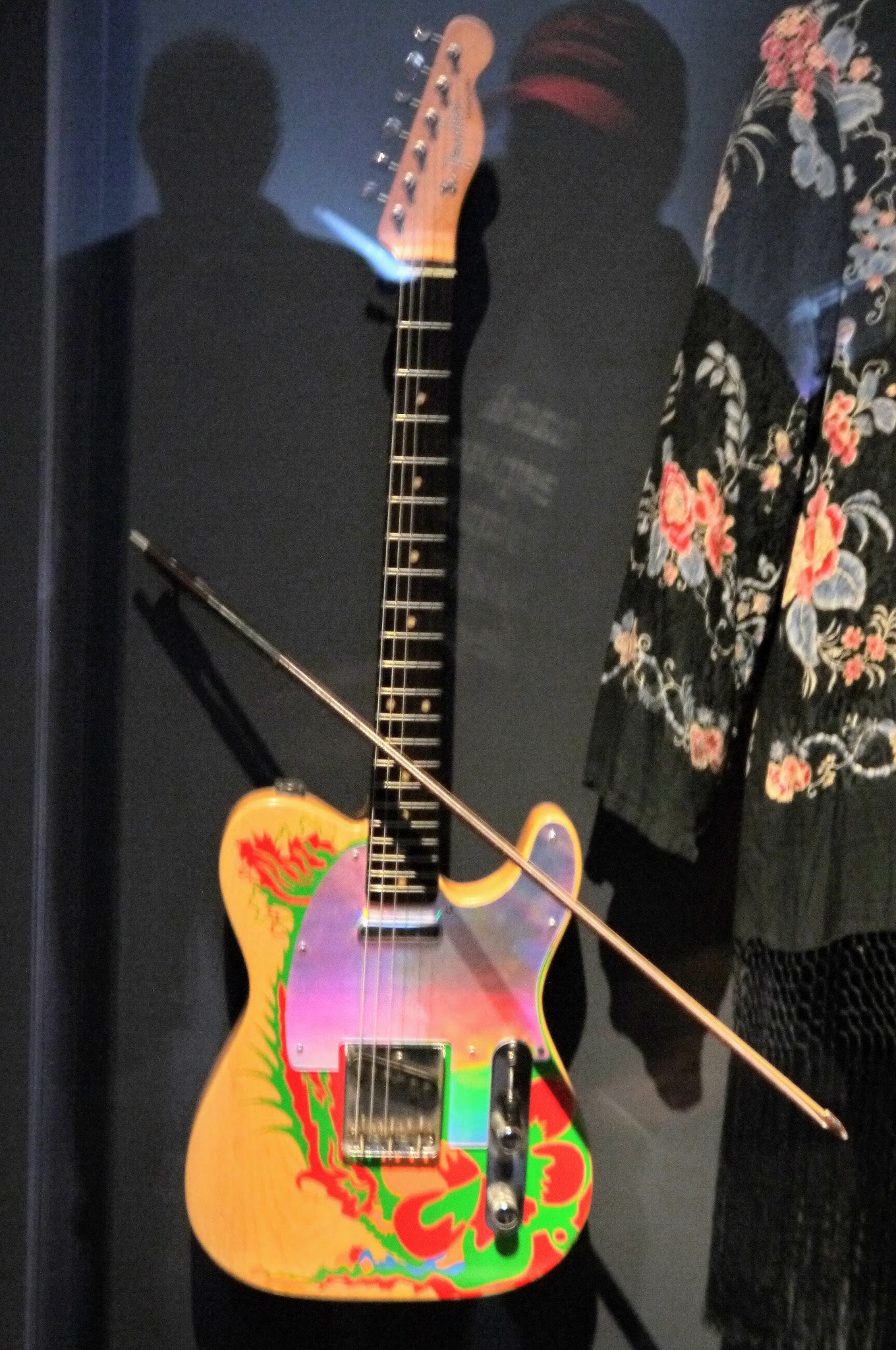
Page's Dragon Telecaster with a violin bow

- 1959 Fender Telecaster (The Dragon). Given to Page by Jeff Beck and repainted with a psychedelic dragon design by Page. Played with the Yardbirds. Used to record the first Led Zeppelin album and used on the early tours during 1968–69. In 1971, it was used for recording the "Stairway to Heaven" solo. It was later disassembled and parts used in other guitars.
- 1959 Gibson Les Paul Standard (No. 1). Sold to Page by Joe Walsh for $500. This guitar was also used by Gibson as the model for the company's second run of Page signature models in 2004. Produced by Gibson and aged by luthier Tom Murphy, this second generation of Page tribute models was limited to 25 guitars signed by Page; and only 150 guitars in total for the aged model issue.
- 1959 Gibson Les Paul Standard (No. 2) with a shaved-down neck to match the profile on his No. 1. He added four push/pull pots to coil-split the humbuckers and phase and series switches under the pick guard after the break-up of Led Zeppelin. Used primarily as an alternate-tuning guitar (DADGAD) and as a back-up for his No. 1 guitar.
- 1969 Gibson Les Paul DeLuxe (No. 3). Seen in The Song Remains the Same during the theremin/solo section of "Whole Lotta Love" and for "Kashmir" at the O2 reunion concert. In 1985, the guitar was fitted with a Parsons-White B-string bender and used extensively by Page from the mid-to-late 1980s onward, including the Outrider tour and the Page/Plant "Unledded" special on MTV.
- 1969 Gibson Les Paul Deluxe. Used only for "Over the Hills and Far Away" during the 1977 North American tour. Slightly different from the Les Paul Deluxe (No. 3) due to its smaller headstock and thin cutaway binding. Refinished in a solid brick-red paint.
- 1991 Gibson Les Paul Custom Shop. English luthier Roger Giffin built a guitar for Page-based loosely on Page's No. 2. Giffin's work was later copied for Gibson's original run of Jimmy Page Signature model Les Pauls in the mid-1990s.
- 1961 Danelectro 3021. Tuned to DADGAD and used live for "White Summer", "Black Mountain Side", "Kashmir", and "Midnight Moonlight" with The Firm. Also tuned to open G live for "In My Time of Dying".
- 1958 Danelectro 3021. Tuned to open G and used on the Outrider tour. This one has a smaller pickguard, as opposed to the large "seal" pickguard on his 1961 Danelectro.

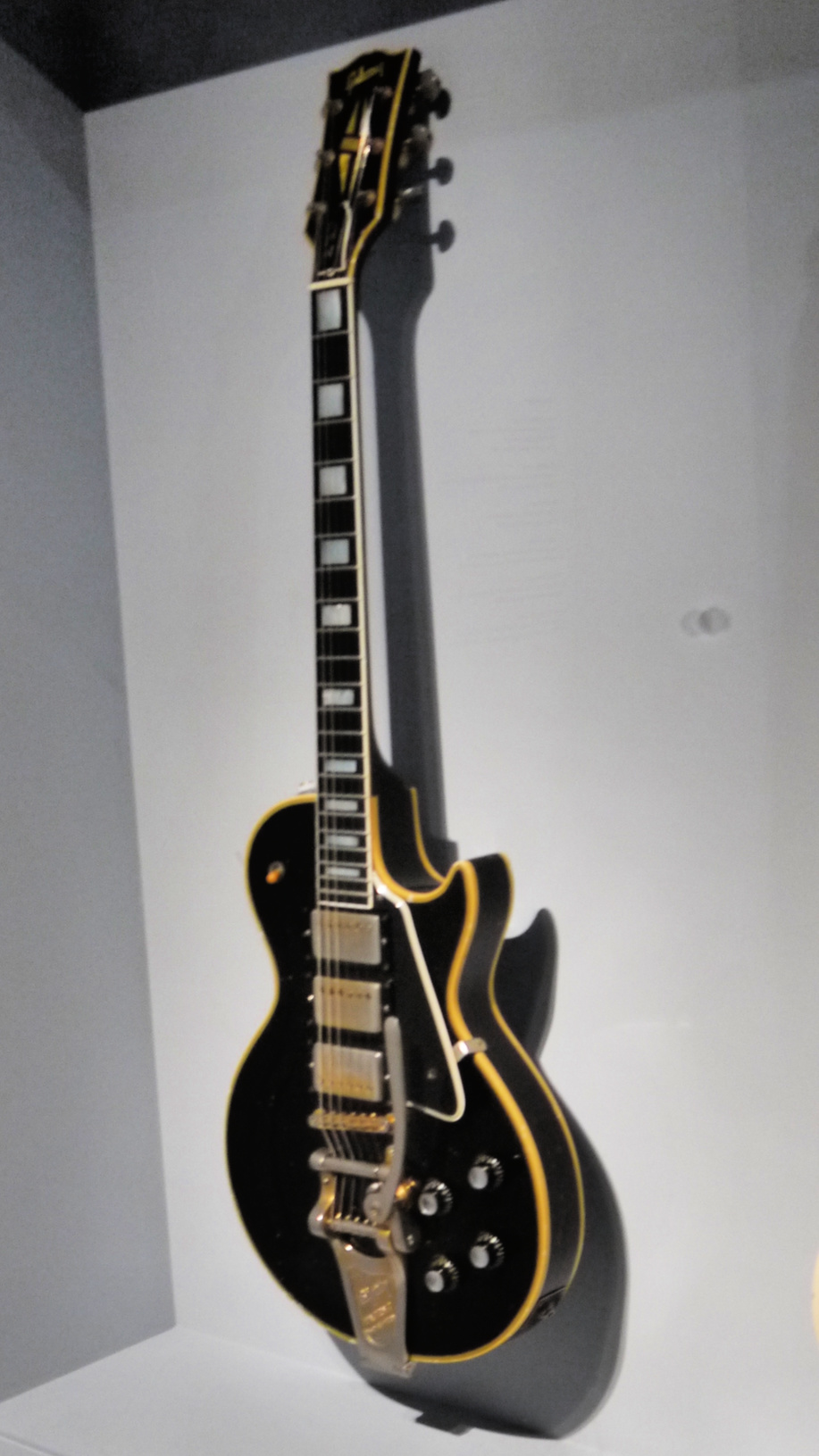
Page's "Black Beauty" Gibson Les Paul which was stolen in 1970 but returned in 2015

- 1960 Black Gibson Les Paul Custom (with Bigsby tremolo) – stolen in 1970. Page ran an ad requesting the return of this highly modified instrument but the guitar was not recovered until 2015–2016. In 2008 the Gibson Custom Shop produced a limited run of 25 re-creations of the guitar, each with a Bigsby tremolo and a new custom six-way toggle switch.
- 1953 Botswana Brown Fender Telecaster featuring a Parsons and White B-string bender, originally with a maple neck, and later refitted with the rosewood neck originally from the "Dragon Telecaster". Seen primarily during the 1980s since it was one of his main guitars on stage during The Firm and Outrider era. Also used on the Led Zeppelin's 1977 North American concert tour and at Knebworth in 1979, notably on "Ten Years Gone" and "Hot Dog".
- 1964 Lake Placid Blue Fender Stratocaster. Used during recording sessions for In Through the Out Door, at Earls Court in 1975, Knebworth in 1979 and the Tour Over Europe 1980 for In the Evening.
- 1966 Cream Fender Telecaster (used on Physical Graffiti and on "All My Love" during the Tour Over Europe in 1980).

===== 12-string electric guitars =====
- 1967 black Vox Phantom 12-string used during the recording for the Yardbirds album Little Games and for onstage appearances. This was also the electric twelve-string guitar used to record "Travelling Riverside Blues" on the BBC Sessions and it was used to record "Thank You" and "Living Loving Maid (She's Just A Woman)" on Led Zeppelin II.
- 1965 Fender Electric XII (12-String) used to record "When the Levee Breaks", "Stairway to Heaven", and "The Song Remains The Same".

===== Acoustic guitars =====
- 1963 Gibson J-200, used to record acoustic parts for Led Zeppelin I. It was loaned to Page by its owner, Big Jim Sullivan, and returned to him after recording the album. Page would later own a re-issue built to the same specs as the 1963 model.
- 1972 Martin D-28, used to record acoustic songs after Led Zeppelin IV, used live at Earls Court in 1975
- Harmony Sovereign H-1260 (year unknown), used on Led Zeppelin III, for the acoustic intro to "Stairway to Heaven", and in live shows from 1970 to 1972.
- 1970 Giannini Craviola twelve-string acoustic used in recording "Tangerine" and in live performances of the same.

===== Multi-neck guitars =====
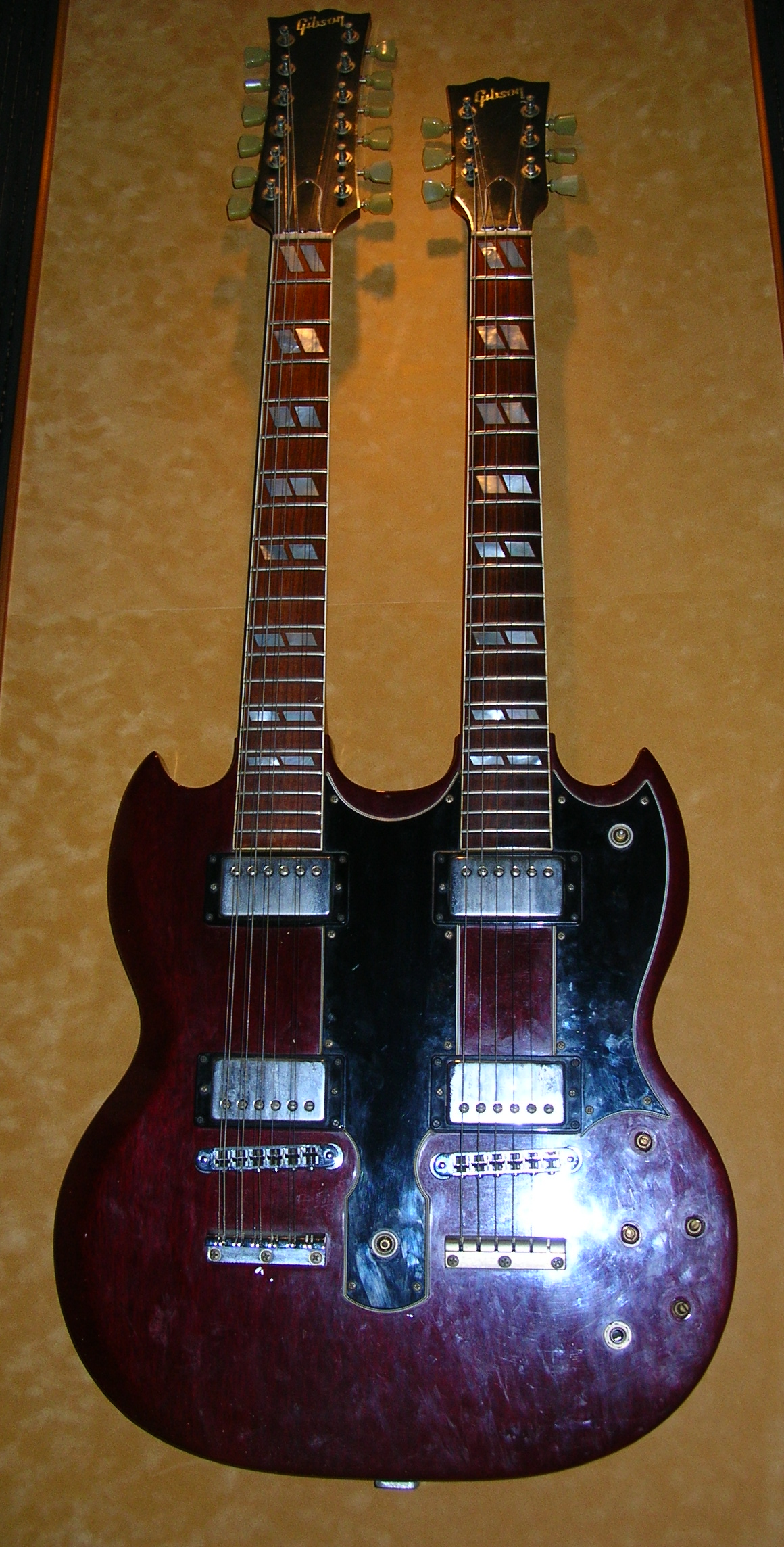
Page's double-neck guitar

- 1971 Gibson EDS-1275. Used during live concerts for playing "Stairway to Heaven", "The Song Remains the Same", "The Rain Song", "Celebration Day" (1971, 1972, and 1979 performances), "Tangerine" (1975 Earls Court shows), and "Sick Again" (1977 North American tour). Jimmy Page says: "My original idea for the opening tracks for Houses Of The Holy was that a short overture would be a rousing instrumental introduction with layered electric guitars that would segue in to 'The Seasons', later to be titled 'The Rain Song'."
- In 1994, Andy Manson was commissioned to make a triple neck guitar for Page. It was used during the "Unledded" performances.

==== Strings ====
- Ernie Ball Super Slinky electric guitar strings .009s-.042s

==== Signature models ====
Gibson released a Jimmy Page Signature Les Paul. The 2004 version included 25 guitars signed by Page, 150 aged by Tom Murphy (an acknowledged ageing "master"), and 840 "unlimited" production guitars. The Jimmy Page Signature EDS-1275 was produced by Gibson. Gibson reproduced Page's 1960 Les Paul Black Beauty, the one stolen from him in 1970, with modern modifications. This guitar was sold in 2008 with a run of 25, again signed by Page, plus an additional 500 unsigned guitars.

In December 2009, Gibson released the 'Jimmy Page "Number Two" Les Paul'. This is a re-creation of Page's famous "Number Two" Les Paul used by him since about 1974. The model includes the same pick-up switching setup as devised by Page, shaved-down neck profile, Burstbucker pick-up at neck, and "Pagebucker" at the bridge. A total of 325 were made in three finishes: 25 Aged by Gibson's Tom Murphy, signed and played by Page ($26,000), 100 aged ($16,000) and 200 with VOS finish ($12,000).

In 2019, Fender released two signature models, both based on Page's 1959 Telecaster (which he received as a gift from Jeff Beck):

- Page's "Mirror" design, which features the guitar in a white blond finish with eight mirrors attached throughout the body.
- Page's "Dragon" design. After the dissolution of the Yardbirds, Page removed the mirrors from the guitar, stripped the finish, and applied a dragon design himself.

=== Other instruments ===
==== Theremin ====
Page frequently employed a scaled-down version of the Theremin known as the Sonic Wave, first using the instrument during live performances with the Yardbirds. As a member of Led Zeppelin, Page played the Sonic Wave on the studio recordings of "Whole Lotta Love" and "No Quarter", and frequently played the instrument at the band's live shows.

==== Hurdy-gurdy ====
Page owns two hurdy-gurdies, and is shown playing one of the instruments in the 1976 film The Song Remains the Same. The second was produced by Christopher Eaton, father of English hurdy-gurdist Nigel Eaton.

=== Amplifiers and effects ===
Page usually recorded in studio with assorted amplifiers by Vox, Axis, Fender, and Orange amplification. Live, he used Hiwatt and Marshall amps. The first Led Zeppelin album was played on a Fender Telecaster through a Supro amplifier. From 1969 onward, Page's principal amp for recording and live use was a Marshall JMP Super Bass 100, which Page had modified for more volume, clarity, and dynamic range, in part by swapping the stock EL34 power tubes for cleaner 6550s.

Page used a limited number of effects, including a Maestro Echoplex, a Dunlop Cry Baby, an MXR Phase 90, a Vox Cry Baby Wah, a Boss CE-2 Chorus, a Yamaha CH-10Mk II Chorus, a Sola Sound Tone Bender Professional Mk II, an MXR Blue Box (distortion/octaver), and a DigiTech Whammy.

== Personal life ==
=== Relationships ===
During the 1960s Page was with American recording artist Jackie DeShannon, who is cited as a possible inspiration for his composition "Tangerine".

French model Charlotte Martin was Page's partner from 1970 to about 1982 or 1983. Page called her "My Lady" and together they had a daughter, Scarlet Page (born in 1971), who is a photographer.

While touring with Led Zeppelin, Page's view on groupies was described as "the younger, the better", according to tour manager Richard Cole. For example, Page had a well-documented, one-year relationship with Lori Mattix (also known as Lori Maddox), beginning when she was 14 or 15 and when he was 28.

From 1986 to 1995, Page was married to Patricia Ecker, a model and waitress. They have a son, James Patrick Page (born April 1988). Page later married Jimena Gómez-Paratcha, whom he met in Brazil on the No Quarter tour. Page adopted her oldest daughter Jana (born 1994), and they have two children together: Zofia Jade (born 1997), an environmental campaigner, and Ashen Josan (born 1999). Page and Gómez-Paratcha divorced in 2008.

Page began a relationship with actress and poet Scarlett Sabet in August 2014.

=== Properties ===
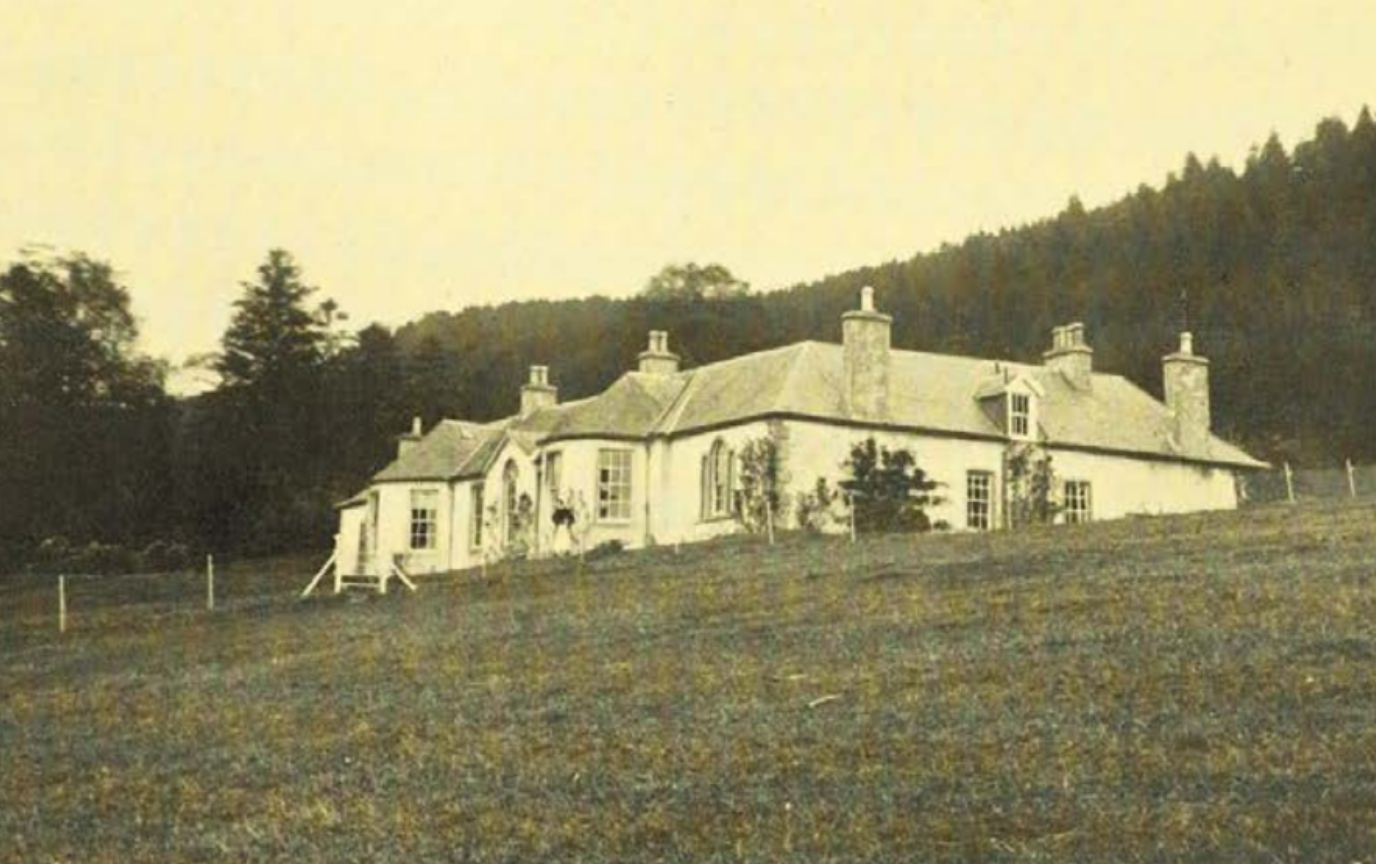
Boleskine House in 1912

In 1967, when Page was still with The Yardbirds, he purchased the Thames Boathouse on the River Thames in Pangbourne, Berkshire and resided there until 1973. The Boathouse was the place where Page and Plant first officially got together in the summer of 1968 and formed Led Zeppelin.

In 1972, Page bought the Tower House from Richard Harris. It was the home that William Burges (1827–81) had designed for himself in London. "I had an interest going back to my teens in the pre-Raphaelite movement and the architecture of Burges", Page said. "What a wonderful world to discover." The reputation of Burges rests on his extravagant designs and his contribution to the Gothic revival in architecture during the 19th Century.

From 1980 to 2004, Page owned the Mill House, Mill Lane, Windsor, which was formerly the home of actor Michael Caine. John Bonham died there in 1980.

From the early 1970s to the early 1990s, Page owned Boleskine House, the former residence of occultist Aleister Crowley. Sections of Page's fantasy sequence in the film The Song Remains the Same were filmed at night on the mountainside directly behind Boleskine House.

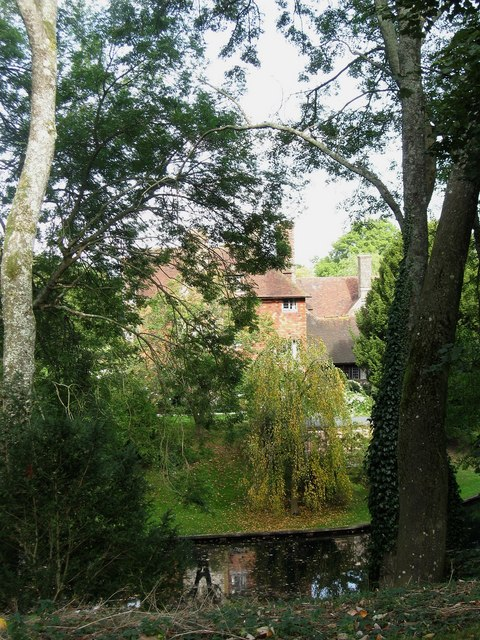
Plumpton Place, previously owned by Page

Page owned Plumpton Place in Sussex, with certain parts of the house designed by Edwin Lutyens. This house features in the Zeppelin film The Song Remains The Same where Page is seen sitting on the lawn playing a hurdy-gurdy.

Page later resided in Sonning, Berkshire in Deanery Garden, a house also designed by Edwin Lutyens for Edward Hudson.

=== Recreational drug use ===
Page acknowledged his heavy recreational drug use throughout the 1970s. In an interview with Guitar World magazine in 2003, he stated: "I can't speak for the [other members of the band], but for me drugs were an integral part of the whole thing, right from the beginning, right to the end." After the band's 1973 North American tour, Page told Nick Kent: "Oh, everyone went over the top a few times. I know I did and, to be honest with you, I don't really remember much of what happened."

In 1975, Page began to use heroin, according to Richard Cole. Cole claims that he and Page took the drug during the recording sessions of the album Presence, and Page admitted shortly afterward that he was addicted.

By Led Zeppelin's 1977 North American tour, Page's heroin addiction was beginning to hamper his guitar playing. By this time the guitarist had lost a noticeable amount of weight. His onstage appearance was not the only obvious change; his addiction caused Page to become so inward and isolated it altered the dynamics between him and Plant. During the recording sessions for In Through the Out Door in 1978, Page's diminished influence on the album (relative to bassist and keyboardist John Paul Jones) is partly attributed to his addiction, which resulted in his absence from the studio for long periods.

Page reportedly overcame his heroin habit in the early 1980s, although he was arrested for possession of cocaine in both 1982 and 1984. He was given a 12-month conditional discharge in 1982 and, despite a second offence usually carrying a jail sentence, he was only fined.

In a 1988 interview with Musician magazine, Page took offense when the interviewer noted that heroin had been associated with him, saying: "Do I look as if I'm a smack addict? Well, I'm not. Thank you very much."

In an interview he gave to Q magazine in 2003, Page responded to a question as to whether he regrets getting so involved in heroin and cocaine:

I don't regret it at all because when I needed to be really focused, I was really focused. That's it. Both Presence and In Through the Out Door were only recorded in three weeks: that's really going some. You've got to be on top of it.

=== Interest in the occult ===
Page's interest in the occult started as a schoolboy at age 15, when he read Aleister Crowley's Magick in Theory and Practice. He later said that following this discovery, he thought: "Yes, that's it. My thing: I've found it."

The appearance of four symbols on the jacket of Led Zeppelin's fourth album has been linked to Page's interest in the occult. The four symbols represent each member of the band. Page's so-called "Zoso" symbol originated in Ars Magica Arteficii (1557) by Gerolamo Cardano, an old alchemical grimoire, where it was identified as a sigil consisting of zodiac signs. The sigil is reproduced in Dictionary of Occult, Hermetic and Alchemical Sigils.

During tours and performances after the release of the fourth album, Page often had the "Zoso" symbol embroidered on his clothes, along with zodiac symbols. These were visible most notably on his "Dragon Suit", which included the signs for Capricorn, Scorpio, and Cancer, which are Page's Sun, Ascendant, and Moon signs, respectively. The "Zoso" symbol also appeared on Page's amplifiers.

The artwork inside the album cover of Led Zeppelin IV is from a painting attributed to artist Barrington Colby, and influenced by the traditional Rider/Waite Tarot card design for the card called "The Hermit". Very little is known about Colby, and rumours have persisted that Page painted it. Page transforms into this character during his fantasy sequence in Led Zeppelin's concert film The Song Remains the Same.

In the early 1970s, Page owned an occult bookshop and publishing house titled The Equinox Booksellers and Publishers, which was named after Crowley's biannual magazine, The Equinox. The design of the interior incorporated Egyptian and Art Deco motifs, with Crowley's birth chart affixed to a wall. Page's reasons for setting up the bookshop were straightforward:

There was not one bookshop in London with a good collection of occult books and I was so pissed off at not being able to get the books I wanted.

The company published two books: a facsimile of Crowley's 1904 edition of The Goetia and Astrology, A Cosmic Science by Isabel Hickey. The lease eventually expired on the premises and was not renewed. As Page said: "It obviously wasn't going to run the way it should without some drastic business changes, and I didn't really want to have to agree to all that. I basically just wanted the shop to be the nucleus, that's all."

Page has maintained a strong interest in Crowley for many years. In 1978, he explained:

I feel Aleister Crowley is a misunderstood genius of the 20th century. It is because his whole thing was liberation of the person, of the entity and that restrictions would foul you up, lead to frustration which leads to violence, crime, mental breakdown, depending on what sort of makeup you have underneath. The further this age we're in now gets into technology and alienation, a lot of the points he's made seem to manifest themselves all down the line. ... I'm not saying it's a system for anybody to follow. I don't agree with everything but I find a lot of it relevant and it's those things that people attacked him on, so he was misunderstood. ... I'm not trying to interest anyone in Aleister Crowley any more than I am in Charles Dickens. All it was, was that at a particular time he was expounding a theory of self-liberation, which is something which is so important. He was like an eye to the world, into the forthcoming situation. My studies have been quite intensive, but I don't particularly want to go into it because it's a personal thing and isn't in relation to anything apart from the fact that I've employed his system in my own day to day life. ... The thing is to come to terms with one's free will, discover one's place and what one is, and from that you can go ahead and do it and not spend your whole life suppressed and frustrated. It's very basically coming to terms with yourself.

Page was commissioned to write soundtrack music for the film Lucifer Rising by a fellow Crowley admirer and underground movie director Kenneth Anger. Page ultimately produced 23 minutes of music for the film. Anger thought this was insufficient; he wanted a full soundtrack for the 28-minute film. Anger claimed Page took three years to deliver the music and the final product was only "droning". The director also slammed the guitarist in the press by calling him a "dabbler" in the occult and an addict too strung out on drugs to complete the project. Page countered that he had fulfilled all his obligations, even going so far as to lend Anger his own film editing equipment to help him finish the project. Page released the Lucifer Rising music on vinyl in 2012 via his website as Lucifer Rising and Other Sound Tracks. Side one contained "Lucifer Rising – Main Track", while side two contained the tracks "Incubus", "Damask", "Unharmonics", "Damask – Ambient", and "Lucifer Rising – Percussive Return". Asked if he had ever reconciled with Anger, Page remarked that, shortly after his website had announced the LP's upcoming release, "curiously enough there was a request, suggesting that Lucifer Rising should come out again with my music on. I ignored it."

Although Page collected works by Crowley, he has never described himself as a Thelemite nor was he ever initiated into Ordo Templi Orientis. The Equinox Bookstore and Boleskine House were both sold during the 1980s, as Page settled into family life and participated in charity work.

== Discography ==
With Led Zeppelin:

- Led Zeppelin (1969)
- Led Zeppelin II (1969)
- Led Zeppelin III (1970)
- Untitled album (1971) (de facto Led Zeppelin IV)
- Houses of the Holy (1973)
- Physical Graffiti (1975)
- Presence (1976)
- In Through the Out Door (1979)
- Coda (1982)

With Roy Harper:

- Whatever Happened to Jugula? (1985)

With The Firm:

- The Firm (1985)
- Mean Business (1986)

Solo:

- Outrider (1988)

With Coverdale–Page:

- Coverdale–Page (1993)

With Page and Plant:

- Walking into Clarksdale (1998)
