= Session man =

Session man may refer to:

- Session musician, one who works with others at live performances or recording sessions
- Session Man (film), a 1991 short drama film that won an Academy Award in 1992
- The Session Man (film), a 2023 documentary film about pianist, Nicky Hopkins
- Jimmy Page: Session Man, a two-volume compilation album featuring Jimmy Page as a session musician
- "Session Man", a song by The Kinks on their album Face to Face
