= Scarlet Page =

British photographer (born 1971)

- Born: Scarlet Lilith Eleida Page; 24 March 1971 (age 55); London, England
- Known for: Photography
- Notable work: Somebody Someday (2001); Your Child (2007)
- Spouse: Tom Brown (m. 2009)
- Children: 2
- Father: Jimmy Page

Scarlet Lilith Eleida Page (born 24 March 1971) is an English photographer. She is the daughter of Led Zeppelin guitarist Jimmy Page and Charlotte Martin, a French model.

== Childhood ==
Born in London, she grew up in England, and stayed at both Plumpton Place in East Sussex (1971–1979), and later the Old Mill House in Mill Lane, Berkshire, where she also learned to play the piano. She was also a passenger in the car driven by Robert Plant's wife Maureen on the Greek island of Rhodes on 4 August 1975, when their hired Austin Mini skidded off the road and collided with a tree. Page was uninjured.

== Career ==
Page was a student of London's University of Westminster, graduating with a BA in Photography, Film and Video. Following an apprenticeship with noted photographer Ross Halfin, she was commissioned to photograph Soundgarden singer Chris Cornell, for rock music publication Raw in 1993. Developing a documentary-style narrative, Page was adept to experiment within live portraiture of The Smashing Pumpkins and Beastie Boys during the 1994 Lollapalooza tour of North America. Page's first major album shoot came in 1995 with the commissioning of the critically acclaimed The Verve release A Northern Soul. Since then, Page's work has been featured in music publications Q, Kerrang!, Blender and Spin.

In June 1999, Page held a charity exhibition entitled Scream for Task Brazil and the ABC Trust. Page's next major shoots involved projects with singer Robbie Williams, with his multi-platinum release Swing When You're Winning in 2000. Page provided the stills for the artwork, as well as content for Williams' 2001 tour photojournal Somebody Someday, and the subsequent 2002 DVD Nobody Someday. In 2004, Page was appointed official photographer for UK band The Darkness. Other artists Page has credits with include the Foo Fighters, The Black Crowes, The Rolling Stones, Stereophonics, Linkin Park, Red Hot Chili Peppers, Placebo, and Gomez amongst others. Since its début in 2006, Page has contributed stills to The Album Chart Show on Channel 4. On 10 September 2007, Page held an exhibition at the Royal Albert Hall entitled Your Child, which featured the lives of celebrities and their children, followed up by contributions to the Visions of Dylan photographic exhibition on 1 October 2007 at The Hospital in Covent Garden, London.

MTV hired her to chronicle the UK music scene throughout May 2008, with access to bands as part of their Spanking New Music Tour coverage. In 2009, Page was commissioned by the veterinary charity PDSA for a calendar entitled Pet Pawtraits featuring celebrities with their pets.

== Personal life ==
On 8 October 2007, a son and a daughter were born to Page and her then-partner Tom Brown; Page and Brown married in 2009.
