= Scarlett Sabet =

English poet (born 1989)

- Born: 1 July 1989 (age 37)
- Occupation: Poet
- Partner: Jimmy Page (2014–present)

Scarlett Zoreh Camille Sabet (born July 1, 1989) is an English poet and performer based in London. She is the author of four poetry collections, Rocking Underground (2014), The Lock And The Key (2016), Zoreh (2018), and Camille (2019). In 2019, she released Catalyst, a spoken word album produced by her partner, Led Zeppelin guitarist Jimmy Page.

== Career ==
Sabet self-published her first collection, Rocking Underground, and gave a reading at its launch at the Chelsea Arts Club in London in November 2014.

Sabet has performed twice at the bookstore Shakespeare & Company in Paris: when her second collection The Lock and The Key was launched in July 2016 and when her fourth collection, Camille, was published in February 2019. In March 2018, Sabet released her third collection, Zoreh, launched with a reading at City Lights Bookstore in San Francisco.

In September 2016, Sabet read at the 25th anniversary of the Annual Aspects Literary Festival in Belfast. Later in January 2017, Sabet gave a reading for the radio programme "Van Morrison and Me", hosted by journalist John McCarthy on the BBC World Service. In 2019, she released the spoken word album Catalyst. The album was produced by Jimmy Page and recorded at his home, the Tower House in London.

Sabet's poetry is influenced by William S. Burroughs, Patti Smith, Emily Dickinson, and Sylvia Plath.

== Published works ==
- Rocking Underground (2014)
- The Lock And The Key (2016)
- Zoreh (2018)
- Camille (2019)
- Catalyst (2019)

== Personal life ==
Sabet was born in Dorking, Surrey, to an Iranian father and a mother of Scottish and French descent. Her partner is Led Zeppelin guitarist Jimmy Page. The couple have been together since August 2014–when Page was 70 years old and Sabet about 24. The couple live together in West London.
