= Show of Peace Concert =

International Show of Peace Concert
- Genre: Rock, pop, rap, soul, R&B
- Dates: October 10, 2010
- Location: Beijing
- Years active: 2010
- Founders: United Nations and Chinese government
- Website: Show of Peace Concert

Show of Peace Concert was a planned global peace concert that gained support from celebrities, musicians and World Leaders. The concert, was to be held at the Bird's Nest Stadium in Beijing, China on October 10, 2010. It was predicted to be the largest globally televised concert event in the history of The People's Republic of China, with support from the United Nations and Chinese Government. The official slogan for the concert was "Peace = Green + No War + Water + Food + Health + Education."

== Overview ==
The International Show of Peace Concert was scheduled to be held during the week of the 40th anniversary of Earth Day to focus on peace through music. The free concert, which was to be attended by 100,000 music fans and more than two billion people were estimated to tune in to it via television, radio and Internet, also aimed to bring awareness to China's national movement to protect the earth and promote "green" living. Rick Garson acted as the executive producer and promoter while Hamish Hamilton as the special director of the event.

== Major acts ==
The supposed headline acts of the event included Jimmy Page, Aerosmith and Prince. Other notable acts expected to play the main stages include Beyoncé, Goo Goo Dolls, Alicia Keys, Maroon 5, Ne-Yo, Kanye West, Christina Aguilera, Backstreet Boys, The Black Eyed Peas, Kelly Clarkson, Green Day, Jay-Z, Jennifer Lopez, Katy Perry, Usher, Mariah Carey, Coldplay, Lady Gaga, Red Hot Chili Peppers, Taylor Swift, Wonder Girls, Gwen Stefani, Orianthi and Justin Timberlake.
