= Jimmy Page: Session Man =

Compilation album series by various artists
- Released: 1989; 1990
- Recorded: 1963–1968
- Genre: Rock
- Label: AIP Records

Volume Two

Professional ratings
Review scores
Source	Rating
Allmusic	(Volume. 1)
Allmusic	(Volume. 2)
Allmusic	(Volume. 3)

Jimmy Page: Session Man is a two-volume compilation album featuring tracks by various artists on which Jimmy Page performed as a session musician, recorded between 1963 and 1968. The album was released by AIP Records (a subsidiary of Bomp! Records) in 1989 (first volume) and the second was released in 1990. Some of the tracks were mastered from vinyl due to the rare nature of the recordings.

The artwork and title are similar to a bootleg compilation released by Slipped Disc Records in 1979, titled James Patrick Page: Session Man.

== Volume One ==
1. Chris Ravel and The Ravers – "Don't You Dig This Kinda Beat" (August 1963)
2. The Zephyrs – "Sweet Little Baby" (August 1963)
3. Pat Wayne with The Beachcombers – "Roll Over Beethoven" (December 1963)
4. Carter-Lewis and the Southerners – "Somebody Told My Girl" (October 1963)
5. Dave Berry and The Cruisers – "My Baby Left Me" (January 1964)
6. The Brooks – "Once in a While" (March 1964)
7. Mickie Most and The Gear – "Money Honey" (March 1964)
8. Mickie Most and The Gear – "That's Alright" (March 1964)
9. The Sneekers – "I Just Can't Go to Sleep" (October 1964)
10. The First Gear – "A Certain Girl" (October 1964)
11. The First Gear – "Leave My Kitten Alone" (October 1964)
12. The Primitives – "How Do You Feel" (January 1965)
13. Bobby Graham – "Zoom, Widge and Wag" (January 1965)
14. Jimmy Page (solo) – "She Just Satisfies" (February 1965)
15. Jimmy Page (solo) – "Keep Moving" (February 1965)
16. The Mickey Finn – "Night Comes Down" (March 1965)
17. The Pickwicks – "Little by Little" (October 1965)
18. Lulu and The Luvvers – "Surprise, Surprise" (April 1965)
19. The Yardbirds – "Little Games" (BBC recording, April 18, 1967)
20. The Yardbirds – "Most Likely You'll Go Your Way (And I'll Go Mine)" (BBC recording, April 4, 1967)
21. Jake Holmes – "Dazed and Confused" (June 1967) {Jimmy Page did not perform on this track}

== Volume Two ==
1. The Sneekers – "Bald Headed Woman" (October 1964)
2. Wayne Gibson and The Dynamic Sounds – "See You Later Alligator" (August 1964)
3. The Zephyrs – "I Can Tell" (August 1963)
4. The Talismen – "Castin' My Spell" (April 1965)
5. Mickie Most – "The Feminine Look" (May 1963)
6. The Untamed – "I'll Go Crazy" (May 1964)
7. The Redcaps – "Talkin' Bout You" (November 1963)
8. Neil Christian and The Crusaders – "Honey Hush" (May 1964)
9. Neil Christian and The Crusaders – "I Like It" (April 1966)
10. Mickey Finn – "This Sporting Life" (March 1963)
11. The Blue Rondos – "Baby I Go for You" (November 1964)
12. Lulu and The Luvvers – "I'll Come Running" (November 1964)
13. Brenda Lee – "Is It True" (October 1964)
14. The Pickwicks – "I Took My Baby Home" (January 1965)
15. The Lancastrians – "The World Keeps Going Round" (January 1966)
16. The Talismen – "Masters of War" (April 1965)
17. The Primitives – "You Said" (January 1965)
18. Scotty McKay Quintet – "Train Kept A-Rollin" (1968)
19. Sean Buckley and The Breadcrumbs – "Everybody Knows" (May 1965)
20. Billy Fury – "Nothin' Shakin" (April 1964)
21. "The Yardbirds" – "White Summer" (purportedly live at the Marquee, October 18, 1968, though it is actually from a Led Zeppelin bootleg)
