= Dictionary of Occult, Hermetic and Alchemical Sigils =

Occult text of sigils and symbols

Dictionary of Occult, Hermetic and Alchemical Sigils, written by Fred Gettings in 1981, is a reference, guide, and source book, which examines variations in, developments of, and meanings of sigils and symbols, used by occultists, alchemists, astrologers, hermeticists, magicians and others, over the past millennium. Contains several thousand sigils from the hermetic, astrological and alchemical tradition. These are classified alphabetically. Gettings also included a useful graphic index which links their graphic form with a related verbal meaning and this would make it much easier to use these sigils meaningfully in ceremonies, etc.
