= Sigil =

Magical symbol

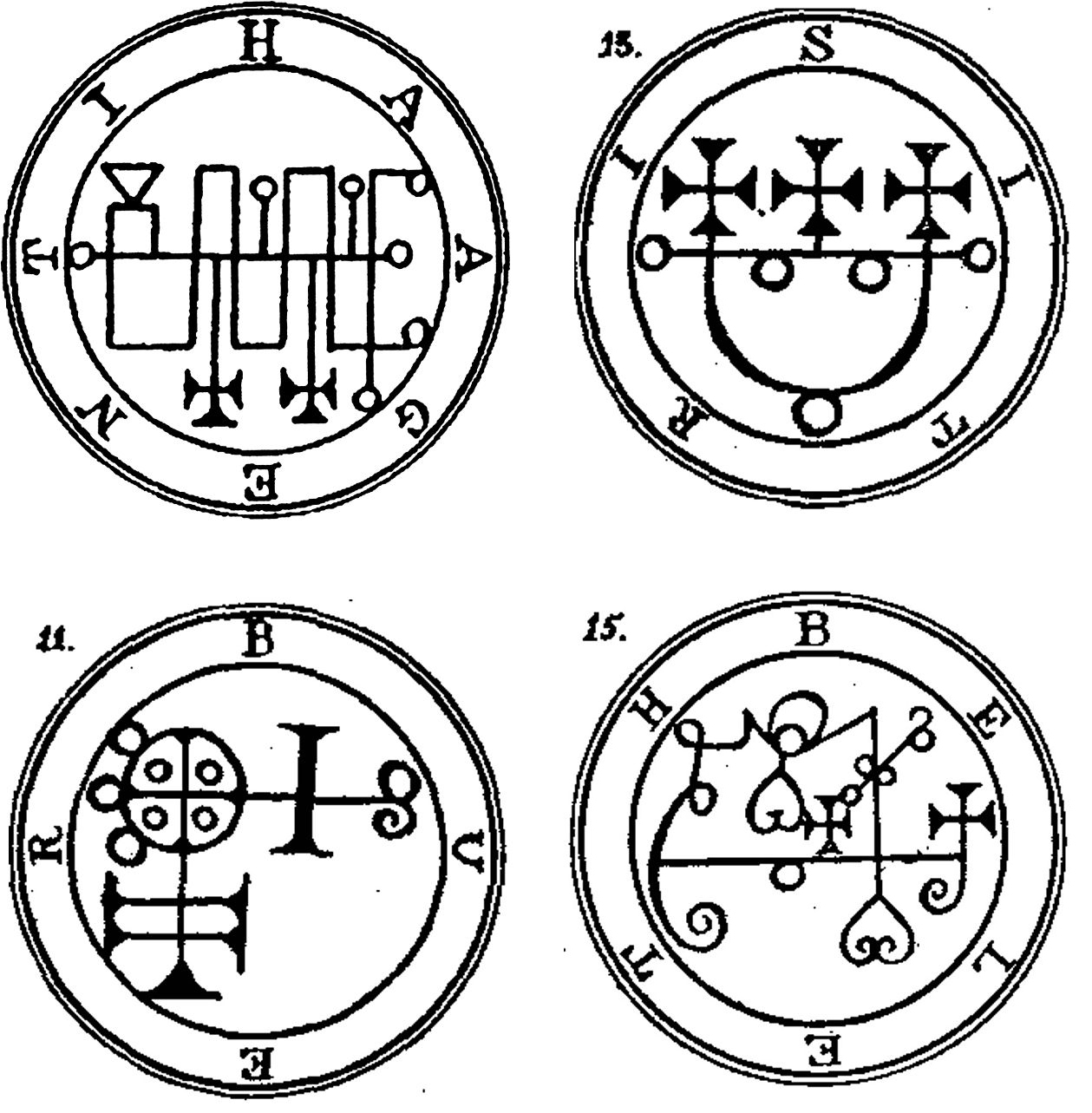
Goetic seals from the Lesser Key of Solomon

A sigil (/ˈsɪdʒɪl/) is a type of symbol used in magic. The term usually refers to a pictorial signature of a spirit (such as an angel, demon, or deity). In modern usage, especially in the context of chaos magic, a sigil refers to a symbolic representation of the practitioner's desired outcome.

== History ==
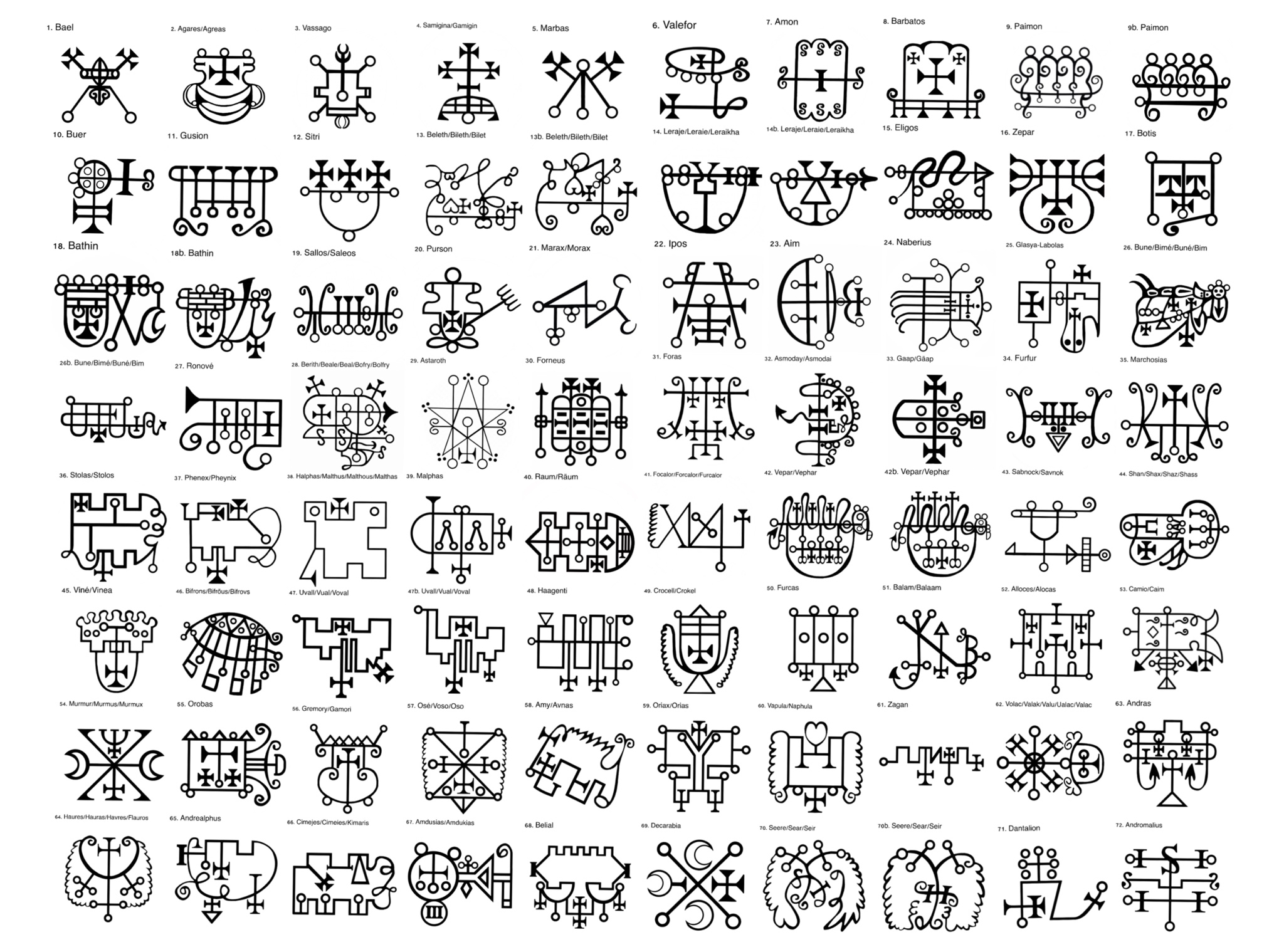
72 seals from The Lesser Key of Solomon

The term sigil derives from the Latin sigillum (pl. sigilla), meaning "seal". In medieval magic, the term sigil was commonly used to refer to occult signs which represented various angels and demons which the practitioner might summon.

=== The Lesser Key of Solomon ===
Magical training books called grimoires often listed pages of such sigils. A particularly well-known list is in The Lesser Key of Solomon, in which the sigils of the 72 princes of the hierarchy of hell are given for the magician's use. Such sigils are considered by some to be the equivalent of the true name of the spirit and thus granted the magician a measure of control over the beings.

== Methods of construction ==
A common method of creating the sigils of certain spirits was to use kameas, a special use case of magic squares—the names of the spirits were converted to numbers, which were then located on the magic square. The locations were then connected by lines, forming an abstract figure.

The word sigil [...] has a long history in Western magic. The members of the Golden Dawn were perfectly familiar with it ("combining the letters, the colours, the attributions and their Synthesis, thou mayest build up a telesmatic Image of a Force. The Sigil shall then serve thee for the tracing of a Current which shall call into action a certain Elemental Force") and it was used in the making of talismans. The sigil was like a signature or sign of an occult entity.

== Austin Osman Spare ==
English artist and occultist Austin Osman Spare (1886–1956) developed his own unique method of creating and using sigils, which has had a lasting effect on modern occultism. Spare did not agree with medieval practice of using these, arguing that such supernatural beings were simply complexes in the unconscious, and could be actively created through the process of sigilization.

Spare's technique became a cornerstone of chaos magic. It also influenced artist Brion Gysin, who experimented with combining Spare's sigil method with the traditional form of magic squares:

Calligraphic magick squares were one of the techniques most commonly applied by Gysin. He would reduce a name or an idea to a "glyph" and then write across the paper from right to left, turn the paper and do the same again, and so on, turning the paper around and around to create a multidimensional grid... The same techniques and consciously driven functional intention also permeated his paintings. In a very real sense, everything he created was an act of sorcery.

== Chaos magic ==
In chaos magic, following Spare, sigils are commonly created in a well-ordered fashion by writing an intention, then condensing the letters of the statement down to form a monogram. The chaos magician then uses the gnostic state to "launch" or "charge" the sigil—essentially bypassing the conscious mind to implant the desire in the unconscious. To quote Ray Sherwin:

The magician acknowledges a desire, he lists the appropriate symbols and arranges them into an easily visualised glyph. Using any of the gnostic techniques he reifies the sigil and then, by force of will, hurls it into his subconscious from where the sigil can begin to work unencumbered by desire.

After charging the sigil, it is considered necessary to repress all memory of it. In the words of Spare, there should be "a deliberate striving to forget it".

In modern chaos magic, when a complex of thoughts, desires, and intentions gains such a level of sophistication that it appears to operate autonomously from the magician's consciousness, as if it were an independent being, then such a complex is referred to as a servitor. When such a being becomes large enough that it exists independently of any one individual, as a form of "group mind", then it is referred to as an egregore.

Later chaos magicians have expanded on the basic sigilization technique. Grant Morrison coined the term hypersigil to refer to an extended work of art with magical meaning and willpower, created using adapted processes of sigilization. Their comic book series The Invisibles was intended as such a hypersigil. Morrison has also argued that modern corporate logos like "the McDonald's Golden Arches, the Nike swoosh and the Virgin autograph" are a form of viral sigil:

Corporate sigils are super-breeders. They attack unbranded imaginative space. They invade Red Square, they infest the cranky streets of Tibet, they etch themselves into hairstyles. They breed across clothing, turning people into advertising hoardings... The logo or brand, like any sigil, is a condensation, a compressed, symbolic summoning up of the world of desire which the corporation intends to represent... Walt Disney died long ago but his sigil, that familiar, cartoonish signature, persists, carrying its own vast weight of meanings, associations, nostalgia and significance.

== See also ==
- Apotropaic magic – Magic intended to turn away harm or evil influences
- Behenian fixed star – Application in medieval astrology
- Ceremonial magic – Variety of rituals of magic
- Dictionary of Occult, Hermetic and Alchemical Sigils – Occult text of sigils and symbols
- Icelandic magical staves – Symbols believed to possess magical properties
- Runic magic – Ancient or modern magic performed with runes or runestones
- Seal of Solomon – Signet ring attributed to the Israelite king Solomon
- Sigil of Baphomet – Sigil of the material world
- Sigil (computer programming) – Symbol affixed to a variable name
- Sigillum Dei – Seal of God, or Seal of Truth, according to John Dee
- Sympathetic magic – Type of magic based on imitation or correspondence
- Veve – Religious symbol commonly used in different branches of Vodun
