= List of songs recorded by Led Zeppelin =

Songs recorded by Led Zeppelin

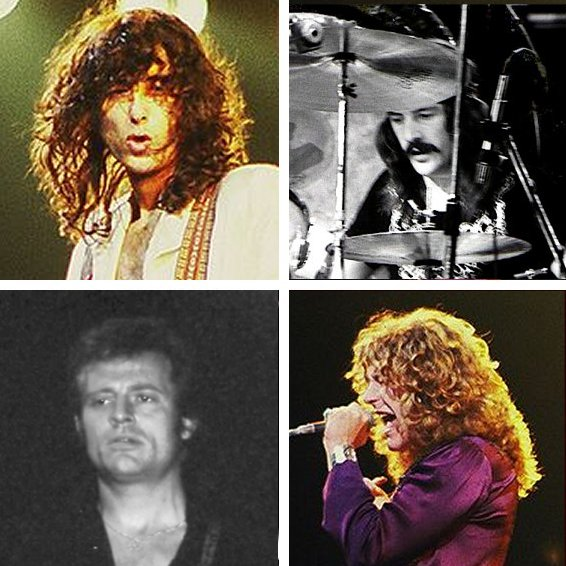
Clockwise, from top left: Jimmy Page, John Bonham, Robert Plant, John Paul Jones

Led Zeppelin were an English rock band who recorded 94 songs between 1968 and 1980. The band pioneered the concept of album-oriented rock and often refused to release popular songs as singles, instead viewing their albums as indivisible, complete listening experiences, and disliked record labels re-editing their songs for single releases.

Their self-titled debut album, Led Zeppelin, released in early 1969, contained songs that were influenced by the genres of blues, hard rock and heavy metal. Led Zeppelin II, released in October 1969, built upon their debut with a more direct, hard-hitting sound that has become a blueprint for heavy metal bands. Led Zeppelin III (1970) marked a musical growth for the band; half of its songs were hard rockers while the other half were built upon folk and acoustic music that gave it "extra depth". "Immigrant Song", released as a single, was backed by the band's only non-album single, "Hey, Hey, What Can I Do". Their untitled fourth album, commonly referred to as Led Zeppelin IV, was released in November 1971. Bringing together all the genres from their previous albums, the album contains some of the band's best-known songs, including "Black Dog", "Rock and Roll", "Going to California" and "Stairway to Heaven", referred to as one of the greatest rock songs of all time.

The band's following albums, Houses of the Holy (1973) and Physical Graffiti (1975), continued the band's musical growth. Houses of the Holy contained a wider range of musical styles, from the ballad "The Rain Song" to the funk-inspired "The Crunge", while Physical Graffiti was a double album that contained new songs as well as unreleased outtakes from previous albums. The album, like its predecessor, contained a variety of musical styles, including hard rock, funk, acoustic rock, blues, soft and progressive rock, and even country rock. Presence (1976) marked a departure from their previous albums by featuring more straightforward, guitar-driven songs with less emphasis on musical experimentation. In Through the Out Door (1979), a direct contrast to Presence, featured a keyboard-heavy sound that was dominated by Jones. The album would prove to be their last as a band, as after Bonham's death in September 1980, the remaining members decided to disband the group. Coda (1982) is a collection of outtakes from various sessions during the band's career.

Since their breakup, 26 songs have seen official release. The Led Zeppelin Boxed Set (1990) saw the release of the band's cover of Robert Johnson's "Travelling Riverside Blues", the live medley "White Summer/Black Mountain Side", and the first album release of "Hey, Hey, What Can I Do?"; the second boxed set (1993) saw the release of "Baby Come On Home". New songs were also released on BBC Sessions (1997) and its remaster, The Complete BBC Sessions (2015), 2003's Led Zeppelin DVD and the live album How the West Was Won (2003). After the release of the concert film Celebration Day (2012), Page announced the remastering of the band's discography in the form of deluxe editions, which together included 13 previously unreleased songs, some of which were different mixes of previously released songs. The albums were released between 2014 and 2015.

== Songs ==
Key
‡	Indicates instrumental
†	Indicates songs written or co-written by others and traditional songs
#	Indicates Deluxe Edition track only
*	Indicates boxed set track only

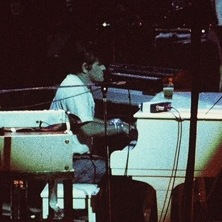
Ian Stewart of the Rolling Stones played piano on two tracks, "Boogie with Stu" and "Rock and Roll".

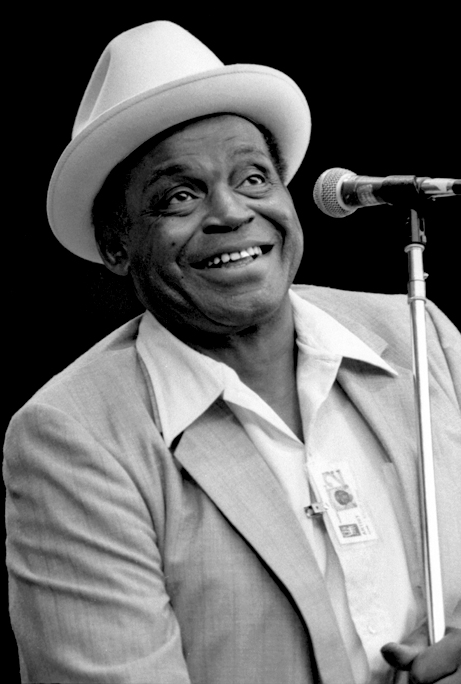
Willie Dixon has a sole writing credit for two tracks, "Bring It On Home" and "I Can't Quit You Baby", and has a partial writing credit for four more, "Whole Lotta Love", "You Shook Me", "The Girl I Love She Got Long Black Wavy Hair", and "Sunshine Woman".

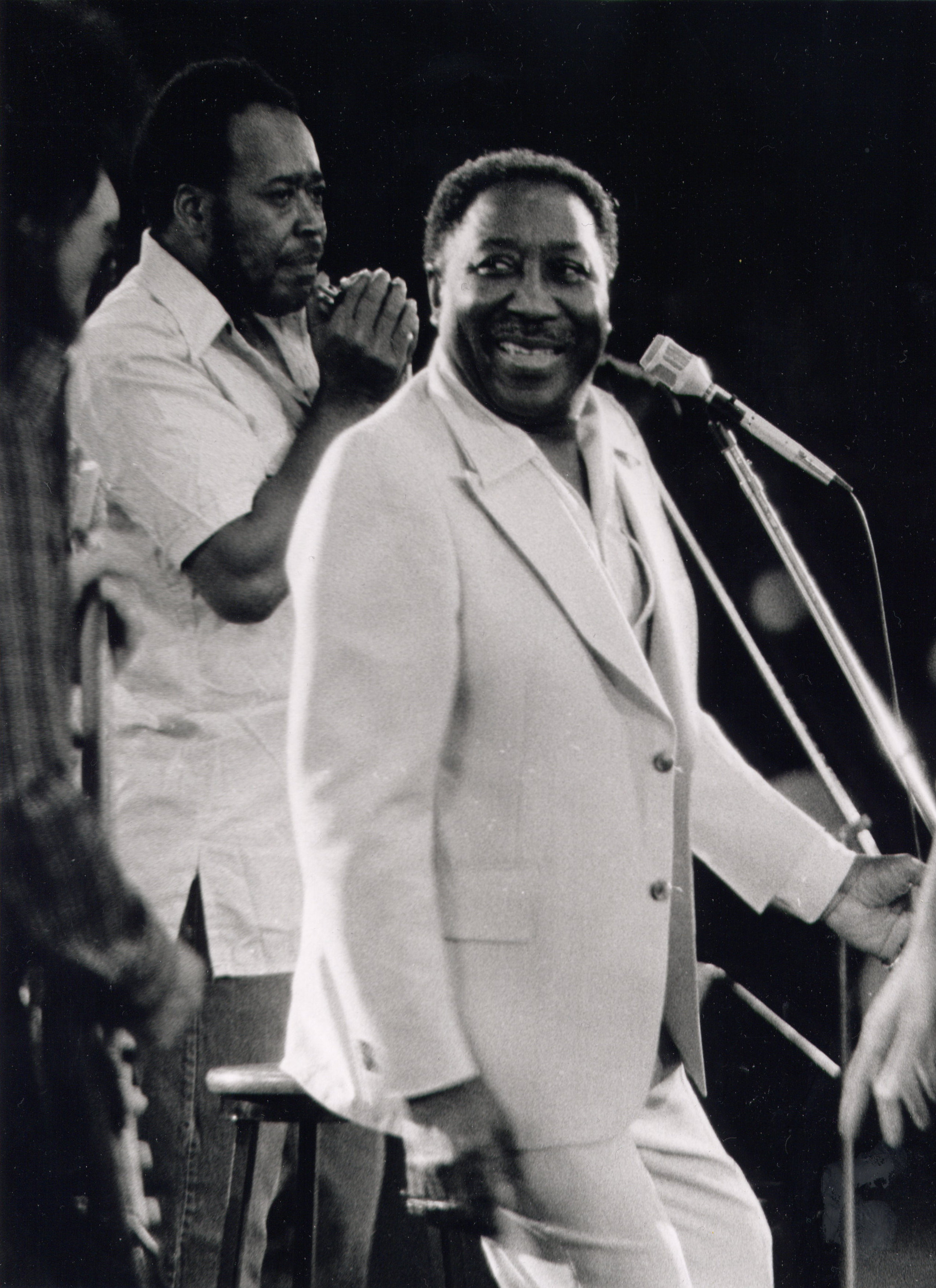
Led Zeppelin covered Muddy Waters' "You Shook Me" on their first album.

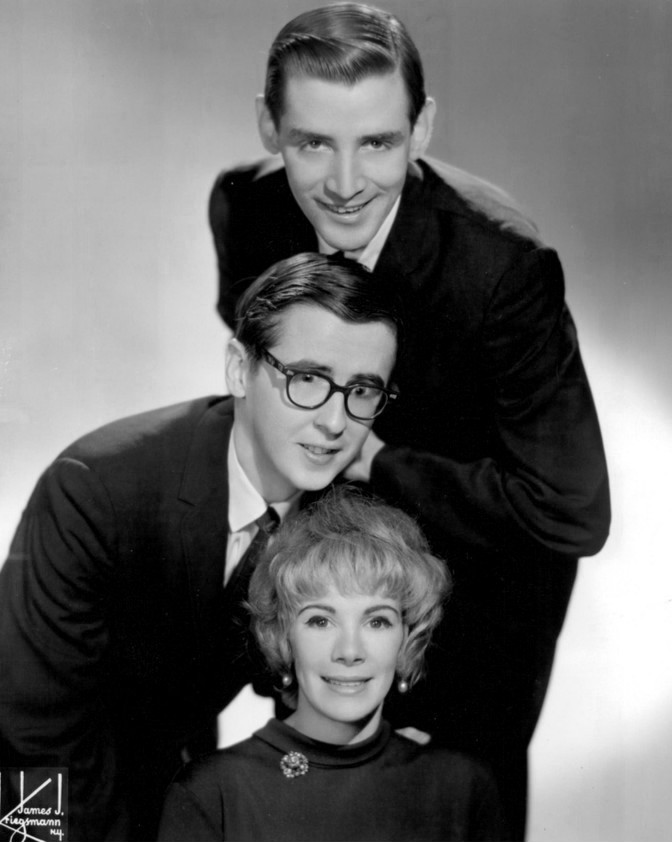
Jake Holmes' (centre) song "Dazed and Confused" was covered by Led Zeppelin on their first album and was originally credited to Jimmy Page solely. After legal action was taken, Led Zeppelin's version is now credited to "Jimmy Page (inspired by Jake Holmes)".

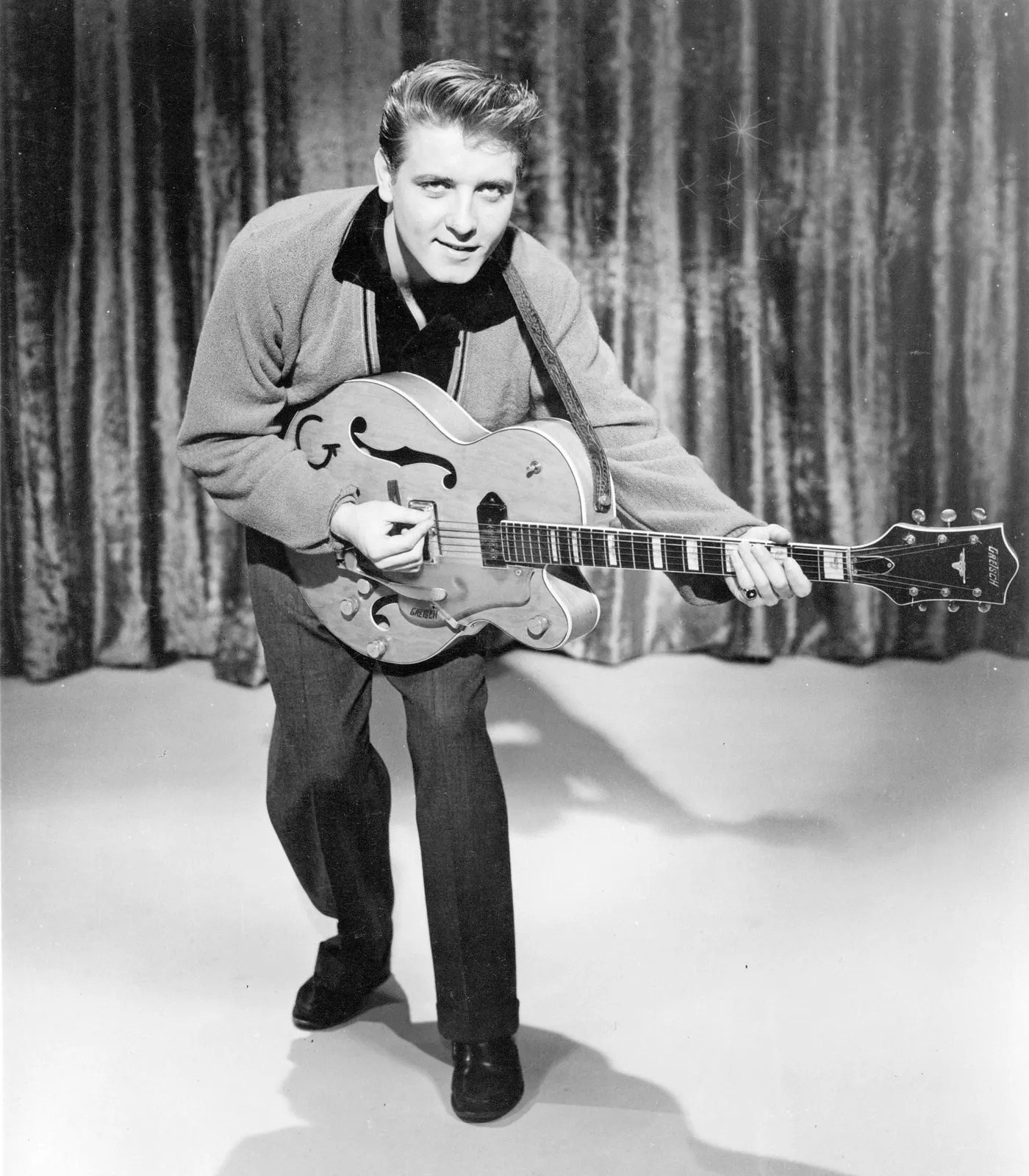
Led Zeppelin's live covers of Eddie Cochran's songs "C'mon Everybody" and "Somethin' Else" were released on the Led Zeppelin DVD in 2003.

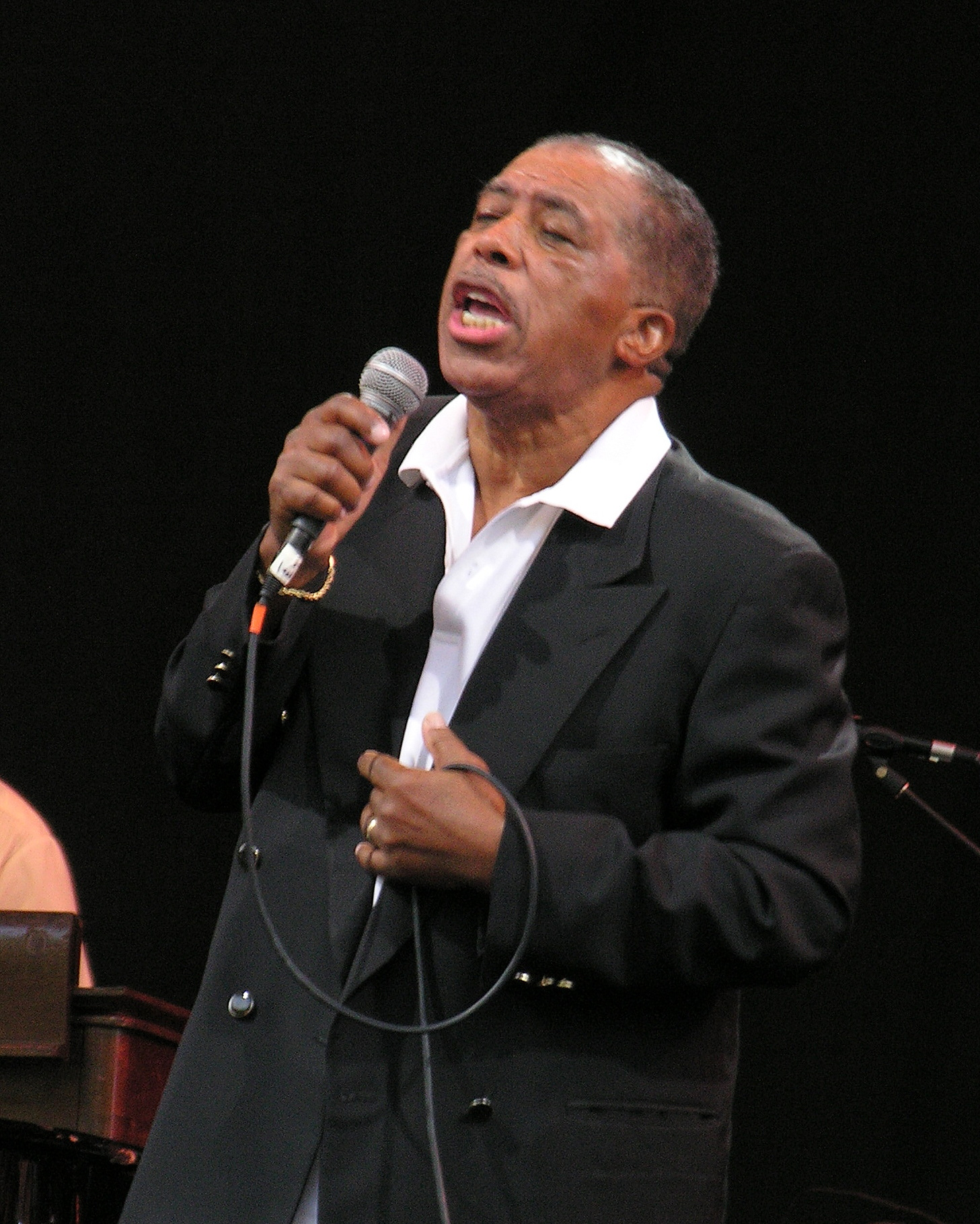
Led Zeppelin performed Ben E. King's song "We're Gonna Groove" during their early concert tours. A performance from 1970 was released on Coda and the Led Zeppelin DVD.

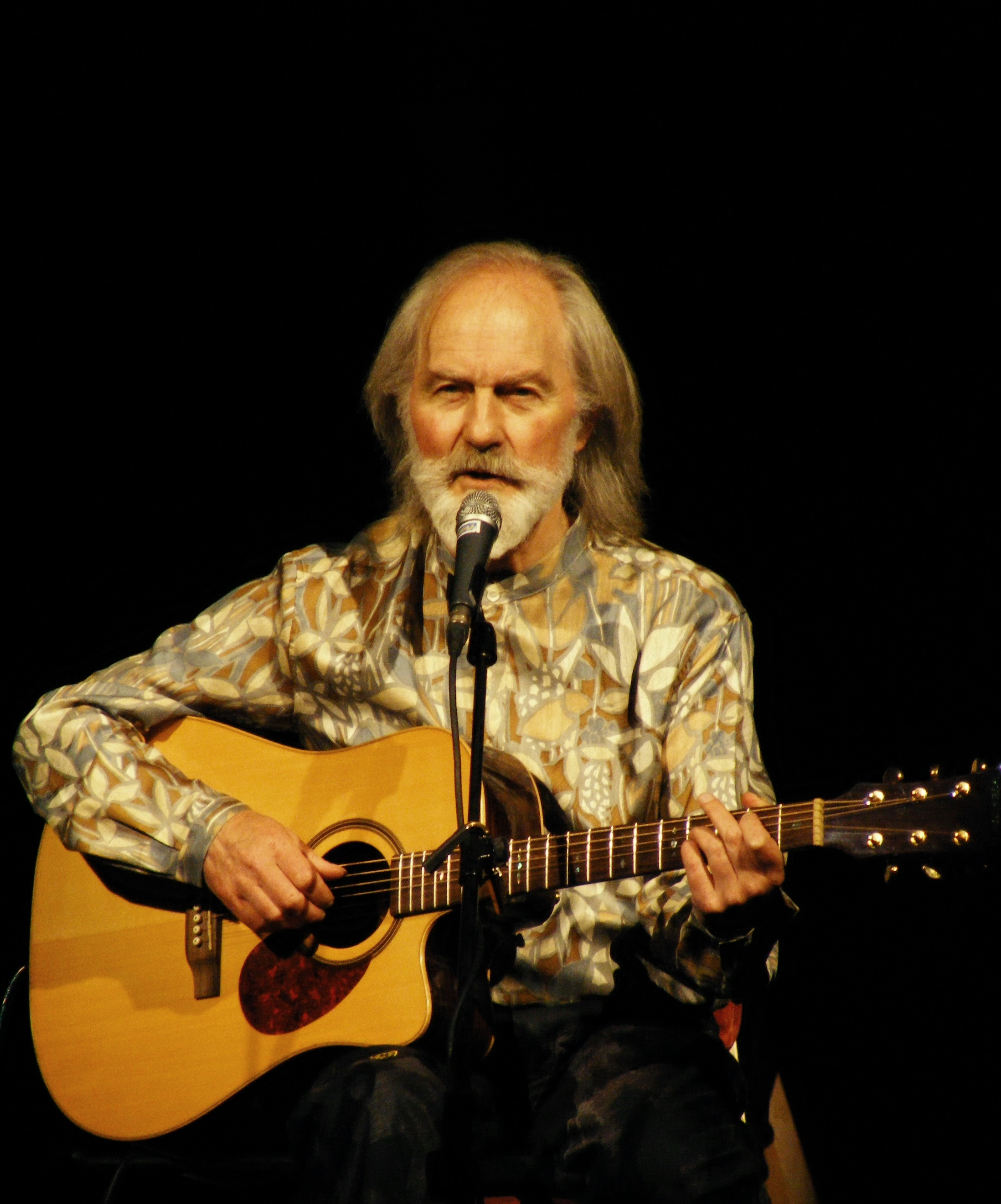
"Hats Off to (Roy) Harper" is a tribute to English folk singer Roy Harper.

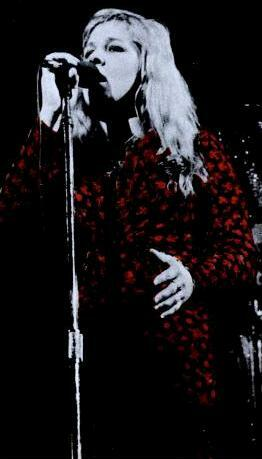
English singer-songwriter Sandy Denny sang lead vocals with Robert Plant on "The Battle of Evermore".

Name of song, writer(s), original release, and year of release
Song	Writer(s)	Original release	Year	Ref.
"10 Ribs & All/Carrot Pod Pod" (Note: Bonus track on the deluxe edition of Presence.) ‡ #	John Paul Jones; Jimmy Page	Presence (Deluxe Edition)	2015	
"Achilles Last Stand" (Note: An early version, titled "Two Ones Are Won", appears as a bonus track on the deluxe edition of Presence.)	Jimmy Page; Robert Plant	Presence	1976	
"All My Love" (Note: An early version, titled "The Hook", appears as a bonus track on the deluxe edition of In Through the Out Door.)	John Paul Jones; Robert Plant	In Through the Out Door	1979	
"Babe I'm Gonna Leave You"	Anne Bredon (Note: The song was originally credited to "Trad. arr. by Jimmy Page". Bredon was made aware of Led Zeppelin's version and since 1990 the song has been credited to Anne Bredon, Jimmy Page, and Robert Plant.); Jimmy Page; Robert Plant (Note: Plant was given a songwriting credit in later editions of the album. ISWC: T-070.211.844-2) †	Led Zeppelin	1969	
"Baby Come On Home" *	Bert Berns; Jimmy Page; Robert Plant †	Led Zeppelin Boxed Set 2	1993	
"The Battle of Evermore" (Note: Features guest vocals from English singer-songwriter Sandy Denny.)	Jimmy Page; Robert Plant	Led Zeppelin IV	1971	
"Black Country Woman"	Jimmy Page; Robert Plant	Physical Graffiti	1975	
"Black Dog"	John Paul Jones; Jimmy Page; Robert Plant	Led Zeppelin IV	1971	
"Black Mountain Side" ‡	Jimmy Page	Led Zeppelin	1969	
"Bonzo's Montreux" ‡	John Bonham	Coda	1982	
"Boogie with Stu"	John Bonham; John Paul Jones; Jimmy Page; Robert Plant; Ian Stewart; Mrs. Valens †	Physical Graffiti	1975	
"Bring It On Home"	Willie Dixon (Note: The original Led Zeppelin II album notes credit Jimmy Page and Robert Plant. The 2004 reissue and subsequent releases credit Dixon solely.) †	Led Zeppelin II	1969	
"Bron-Y-Aur Stomp" (Note: An early version, titled "Jennings Farm Blues", appears as a bonus track on the deluxe edition of Led Zeppelin III.)	John Paul Jones; Jimmy Page; Robert Plant	Led Zeppelin III	1970	
"Bron-Yr-Aur" ‡	Jimmy Page	Physical Graffiti	1975	
"Candy Store Rock"	Jimmy Page; Robert Plant	Presence	1976	
"Carouselambra" (Note: An early version, titled "The Epic", appears as a bonus track on the deluxe edition of In Through the Out Door.)	John Paul Jones; Jimmy Page; Robert Plant	In Through the Out Door	1979	
"Celebration Day"	John Paul Jones; Jimmy Page; Robert Plant	Led Zeppelin III	1970	
"Communication Breakdown"	John Bonham; John Paul Jones; Jimmy Page; Robert Plant	Led Zeppelin	1969	
"The Crunge"	John Bonham; John Paul Jones; Jimmy Page; Robert Plant	Houses of the Holy	1973	
"Custard Pie"	Jimmy Page; Robert Plant	Physical Graffiti	1975	
"C'mon Everybody"	Jerry Capehart; Eddie Cochran †	Led Zeppelin DVD	2003	
"Dancing Days"	Jimmy Page; Robert Plant	Houses of the Holy	1973	
"Darlene"	John Bonham; John Paul Jones; Jimmy Page; Robert Plant	Coda	1982	
"Dazed and Confused"	Jimmy Page (inspired by Jake Holmes) (Note: The original Led Zeppelin album notes credit Jimmy Page solely. Celebration Day and subsequent reissues credit "Jimmy Page (inspired by Jake Holmes)".) †	Led Zeppelin	1969	
"Down by the Seaside"	Jimmy Page; Robert Plant	Physical Graffiti	1975	
"D'yer Mak'er"	John Bonham; John Paul Jones; Jimmy Page; Robert Plant	Houses of the Holy	1973	
"Fool in the Rain"	John Paul Jones; Jimmy Page; Robert Plant	In Through the Out Door	1979	
"For Your Life"	Jimmy Page; Robert Plant	Presence	1976	
"Four Sticks" (Note: An early version, titled "Four Hands", appears as a bonus track on the deluxe edition of Coda.)	Jimmy Page; Robert Plant	Led Zeppelin IV	1971	
"Friends"	Jimmy Page; Robert Plant	Led Zeppelin III	1970	
"Gallows Pole"	Traditional, arr. by Jimmy Page & Robert Plant †	Led Zeppelin III	1970	
"The Girl I Love She Got Long Black Wavy Hair"	John Bonham; John Paul Jones; Jimmy Page; Robert Plant; Sleepy John Estes; Willie Dixon; Robert Johnson (Note: The original BBC Sessions credits Bonham, Jones, Page, Plant, and Sleepy John Estes. The 2016 remastered edition includes "Contains interpolations from "Let Me Love You Baby" by Willie Dixon [and] "Travelling Riverside" by Robert Johnson" and adds Dixon and Johnson to the credits.) †	BBC Sessions	1997	
"Going to California"	Jimmy Page; Robert Plant	Led Zeppelin IV	1971	
"Good Times Bad Times"	John Bonham; John Paul Jones; Jimmy Page; Robert Plant	Led Zeppelin	1969	
"Hats Off to (Roy) Harper"	Traditional, arr. by Charles Obscure (Note: Charles Obscure is a pseudonym for Jimmy Page.) †	Led Zeppelin III	1970	
"Heartbreaker"	John Bonham; John Paul Jones; Jimmy Page; Robert Plant	Led Zeppelin II	1969	
"Hey, Hey, What Can I Do"	John Bonham; John Paul Jones; Jimmy Page; Robert Plant	Non-album single (B-side to "Immigrant Song")	1970	
"Hot Dog"	Jimmy Page; Robert Plant	In Through the Out Door	1979	
"Hots On for Nowhere"	Jimmy Page; Robert Plant	Presence	1976	
"Houses of the Holy"	Jimmy Page; Robert Plant	Physical Graffiti	1975	
"How Many More Times"	John Bonham; John Paul Jones; Jimmy Page; Robert Plant	Led Zeppelin	1969	
"I Can't Quit You Baby" (Note: An edited live version recorded on 9 January 1970 was released on Coda (1982).)	Willie Dixon †	Led Zeppelin	1969	
"I'm Gonna Crawl" (Note: An early version, titled "Blot", appears as a bonus track on the deluxe edition of In Through the Out Door.)	John Paul Jones; Jimmy Page; Robert Plant	In Through the Out Door	1979	
"Immigrant Song"	Jimmy Page; Robert Plant	Led Zeppelin III	1970	
"In My Time of Dying"	John Bonham; John Paul Jones; Jimmy Page; Robert Plant	Physical Graffiti	1975	
"In the Evening"	John Paul Jones; Jimmy Page; Robert Plant	In Through the Out Door	1979	
"In the Light" (Note: An early version, titled "Everybody Makes It Through", appears as a bonus track on the deluxe edition of Physical Graffiti.)	John Paul Jones; Jimmy Page; Robert Plant	Physical Graffiti	1975	
"Kashmir" (Note: An early version, titled "Driving Through Kashmir", appears as a bonus track on the deluxe edition of Physical Graffiti.)	John Bonham; Jimmy Page; Robert Plant	Physical Graffiti	1975	
"Key to the Highway/Trouble in Mind" (Note: Bonus track on the re-issue of Led Zeppelin III.) #	Big Bill Broonzy; Charlie Segar; Richard M. Jones †	Led Zeppelin III (Deluxe Edition)	2014	
"LA Drone" ‡	John Paul Jones; Jimmy Page	How the West Was Won	2003	
"La La" (Note: Bonus track on the re-issue of Led Zeppelin II.) ‡ #	John Paul Jones; Jimmy Page	Led Zeppelin II (Deluxe Edition)	2014	
"The Lemon Song"	John Bonham; Chester Burnett a.k.a. Howlin' Wolf (Note: Originally uncredited, after a lawsuit, the song co-credits Howlin' Wolf under his real name, Chester Burnett.); John Paul Jones; Jimmy Page; Robert Plant †	Led Zeppelin II	1969	
"Living Loving Maid (She's Just a Woman)"	Jimmy Page; Robert Plant	Led Zeppelin II	1969	
"Misty Mountain Hop"	John Paul Jones; Jimmy Page; Robert Plant	Led Zeppelin IV	1971	
"Moby Dick" ‡	John Bonham; John Paul Jones; Jimmy Page	Led Zeppelin II	1969	
"Night Flight"	John Paul Jones; Jimmy Page; Robert Plant	Physical Graffiti	1975	
"Nobody's Fault but Mine"	Jimmy Page; Robert Plant	Presence	1976	
"No Quarter"	John Paul Jones; Jimmy Page; Robert Plant	Houses of the Holy	1973	
"The Ocean"	John Bonham; John Paul Jones; Jimmy Page; Robert Plant	Houses of the Holy	1973	
"Out on the Tiles" (Note: An early version, titled "Bathroom Sound", appears as a bonus track on the deluxe edition of Led Zeppelin III.)	John Bonham; Jimmy Page; Robert Plant	Led Zeppelin III	1970	
"Over the Hills and Far Away"	Jimmy Page; Robert Plant	Houses of the Holy	1973	
"Ozone Baby"	Jimmy Page; Robert Plant	Coda	1982	
"Poor Tom"	Jimmy Page; Robert Plant	Coda	1982	
"The Rain Song"	Jimmy Page; Robert Plant	Houses of the Holy	1973	
"Ramble On"	Jimmy Page; Robert Plant	Led Zeppelin II	1969	
"Rock and Roll"	John Bonham; John Paul Jones; Jimmy Page; Robert Plant	Led Zeppelin IV	1971	
"The Rover"	Jimmy Page; Robert Plant	Physical Graffiti	1975	
"Royal Orleans"	John Bonham; John Paul Jones; Jimmy Page; Robert Plant	Presence	1976	
"Sick Again"	Jimmy Page; Robert Plant	Physical Graffiti	1975	
"Since I've Been Loving You"	John Paul Jones; Jimmy Page; Robert Plant	Led Zeppelin III	1970	
"Somethin' Else"	Bob Cochran; Sharon Sheeley †	BBC Sessions	1997	
"The Song Remains the Same"	Jimmy Page; Robert Plant	Houses of the Holy	1973	
"South Bound Saurez" (Note: An early version, titled "Southbound Piano", appears as a bonus track on the deluxe edition of In Through the Out Door.)	John Paul Jones; Robert Plant	In Through the Out Door	1979	
"St. Tristan's Sword" (Note: Bonus track on the deluxe edition of Coda.) ‡ #	Jimmy Page	Coda (Deluxe Edition)	2015	
"Stairway to Heaven"	Jimmy Page; Robert Plant	Led Zeppelin IV	1971	
"Sugar Mama" #	Jimmy Page; Robert Plant	Coda (Deluxe Edition)	2015	
"Sunshine Woman"	John Bonham; John Paul Jones; Jimmy Page; Robert Plant; Willie Dixon; Robert Johnson †	The Complete BBC Sessions	2016	
"Tangerine"	Jimmy Page	Led Zeppelin III	1970	
"Tea for One"	Jimmy Page; Robert Plant	Presence	1976	
"Ten Years Gone"	Jimmy Page; Robert Plant	Physical Graffiti	1975	
"Thank You"	Jimmy Page; Robert Plant	Led Zeppelin II	1969	
"That's the Way"	Jimmy Page; Robert Plant	Led Zeppelin III	1970	
"Trampled Under Foot" (Note: An early version, titled "Brandy & Coke", appears as a bonus track on the deluxe edition of Physical Graffiti.)	John Paul Jones; Jimmy Page; Robert Plant	Physical Graffiti	1975	
"Travelling Riverside Blues" *	Robert Johnson; Jimmy Page; Robert Plant †	Led Zeppelin Boxed Set	1990	
"Walter's Walk"	Jimmy Page; Robert Plant	Coda	1982	
"The Wanton Song" (Note: An early version, titled "Desire", appears as a bonus track on the deluxe edition of Coda.)	Jimmy Page; Robert Plant	Physical Graffiti	1975	
"Wearing and Tearing"	Jimmy Page; Robert Plant	Coda	1982	
"We're Gonna Groove"	James A. Bethea; Ben E. King †	Coda	1982	
"What Is and What Should Never Be"	Jimmy Page; Robert Plant	Led Zeppelin II	1969	
"When the Levee Breaks" (Note: An early version, titled "If It Keeps On Raining", appears as a bonus track on the deluxe edition of Coda.)	John Bonham; John Paul Jones; Memphis Minnie; Jimmy Page; Robert Plant †	Led Zeppelin IV	1971	
"White Summer/Black Mountain Side" *	Jimmy Page	Led Zeppelin Boxed Set	1990	
"Whole Lotta Love"	John Bonham; Willie Dixon (Note: The song contains similarities to the Willie Dixon-penned "You Need Love", first performed by Muddy Waters. Originally uncredited, after a lawsuit in 1985, Dixon is now credited as a co-writer.); John Paul Jones; Jimmy Page; Robert Plant †	Led Zeppelin II	1969	
"You Shook Me" †	Willie Dixon; J. B. Lenoir †	Led Zeppelin	1969	
"Your Time Is Gonna Come"	John Paul Jones; Jimmy Page; Robert Plant	Led Zeppelin	1969	

== Collaborations between ex-Zeppelin members ==
Year of recording (Note: For detailed dates, see article or link)	Year of release (Note: Where release years differ by country, the earliest year. For detailed dates, see article or link)	Album	Credited to	Collaboration by Robert Plant	Collaboration by Jimmy Page	Collaboration by John Paul Jones	Collaboration by John Bonham
1968−81	1982	Coda	Led Zeppelin	Yes	Yes	Yes	Yes
1984	1984	The Honeydrippers: Volume One	The Honeydrippers	Yes	Yes		
1984	1985	Scream for Help	John Paul Jones		Yes	Yes	
1985	–	Live Aid (Live Reunion)	Led Zeppelin	Yes	Yes	Yes	
1987	1988	Now and Zen	Robert Plant	Yes	Yes		
1987	1988	Outrider	Jimmy Page	Yes	Yes		
1988	–	Atlantic Records 40th anniversary (Live Reunion)	Led Zeppelin	Yes	Yes	Yes	
1992–1993	1993	Fate of Nations	Robert Plant	Yes	Yes		
1994	1994	No Quarter: Jimmy Page and Robert Plant Unledded	Page and Plant	Yes	Yes		
1995	–	Rock and Roll Hall of Fame (Live Reunion)	Led Zeppelin	Yes	Yes	Yes	
1997	1998	Walking into Clarksdale	Page and Plant	Yes	Yes		
2001	2001	The Legacy Of Sun Records	Various	Yes	Yes		
2007	2012	Celebration Day (Live Reunion)	Led Zeppelin	Yes	Yes	Yes	
2008	2008	Live at Wembley Stadium	Foo Fighters		Yes	Yes	
1968–1970, 2021	2025	Becoming Led Zeppelin (Documentary)	Led Zeppelin	Yes	Yes	Yes	Yes

== Bibliography ==
- Akkerman, Gregg (2014). Experiencing Led Zeppelin: A Listener's Companion. Rowman & Littlefield. ISBN 978-0-8108-8916-3.
- Davis, Erik (2005). Led Zeppelin IV. New York: Continuum. ISBN 0-8264-1658-6.
- Inaba, Mitsutoshi (2011). Willie Dixon: Preacher of the Blues. Scarecrow Press. ISBN 978-0-8108-6993-6.
- Lewis, Dave (1990). Led Zeppelin: A Celebration. Omnibus Press. ISBN 978-0-711-92416-1.
- Lewis, Dave (1994). The Complete Guide to the Music of Led Zeppelin. Omnibus Press. ISBN 0-7119-3528-9.
- Lewis, Dave (2012). Led Zeppelin: From a Whisper to a Scream; The Complete Guide to the Music of Led Zeppelin. Omnibus Press. ISBN 978-1-78038-547-1.
- Segrest, James; Hoffman, Mark (2004). Moanin' at Midnight: The Life and Times of Howlin' Wolf. New York City: Pantheon Books. ISBN 0-375-42246-3.
- Wall, Mick (1 November 2008). "The truth behind the Led Zeppelin legend". The Times. Archived from the original on 16 June 2011.
- Yorke, Ritchie (1993). Led Zeppelin: The Definitive Biography. Novato, California: Underwood–Miller. ISBN 0-88733-177-7.
