= Led Zeppelin Deluxe Edition =

Re-release series by Led Zeppelin

Studio album / live album by Led Zeppelin
- Released: 2 June 2014–31 July 2015
- Recorded: 1968–1981
- Genre: Hard rock, blues rock, heavy metal, folk rock, blues, rock and roll, folk, progressive rock, rock
- Label: Atlantic
- Producer: Jimmy Page

Led Zeppelin chronology
Celebration Day (2012)	Led Zeppelin Deluxe Edition (2014)	The Complete BBC Sessions (2016)

The Led Zeppelin Deluxe Edition is a series of albums reissued by English rock group Led Zeppelin, distributed by Atlantic Records. It contains all nine of the original Led Zeppelin studio albums remastered from the original analog tapes. Along with the remastered albums, there is a companion disc with each album, consisting of previously unreleased audio tracks and alternate mixes of released tracks. Many of these are described as work-in-progress or alternate mixes made during the original production rather than new remixes generated to highlight discarded recording elements (as did the remixes made for The Beatles Anthology). The first companion album consists of the 10 October 1969 concert in Paris. The albums were released in chronological order, each with inverted album covers.

The first wave of albums, Led Zeppelin, Led Zeppelin II, and Led Zeppelin III, was released on 2 June 2014. The second wave of albums, Led Zeppelin IV and Houses of the Holy, was released on 27 October 2014. Physical Graffiti was released on 23 February 2015, almost exactly forty years to the day after the original release. The fourth and final wave of albums, Presence, In Through the Out Door, and Coda, was released on 31 July 2015.

== Led Zeppelin ==
Led Zeppelin (Deluxe Edition)

Studio album / live album by Led Zeppelin
- Released: 2 June 2014
- Recorded: 10 October 1969 at The Olympia, Paris, France
- Genre: Hard rock, blues rock, heavy metal
- Length: 116:04
- Label: Atlantic
- Producer: Jimmy Page

Led Zeppelin chronology
Celebration Day (2012)	Led Zeppelin (Deluxe Edition) (2014)	Led Zeppelin II (Deluxe Edition) (2014)

Singles from Led Zeppelin (Deluxe Edition)
- 1. "Good Times Bad Times / Communication Breakdown (Live at the Olympia, Paris, 1969)" Released: 15 April 2014

Led Zeppelin (disc one)
No.	Title	Writer(s)	Length
1.	"Good Times Bad Times"	John Bonham, John Paul Jones, Jimmy Page	2:46
2.	"Babe I'm Gonna Leave You"	Anne Bredon, Traditional arr., Page, Robert Plant	6:42
3.	"You Shook Me"	Willie Dixon, J. B. Lenoir	6:28
4.	"Dazed and Confused"	Page (inspired by Jake Holmes)	6:28
5.	"Your Time Is Gonna Come"	Jones, Page	4:34
6.	"Black Mountain Side"	Page	2:12
7.	"Communication Breakdown"	Bonham, Jones, Page	2:30
8.	"I Can't Quit You Baby"	Dixon	4:42
9.	"How Many More Times"	Bonham, Jones, Page	8:27
Total length:			44:52

Live at the Olympia (disc two)
No.	Title	Writer(s)	Length
1.	"Good Times Bad Times"/"Communication Breakdown"	Bonham, Jones, Page	3:52 (CD)*
2.	"I Can't Quit You Baby"	Dixon	6:41
3.	"Heartbreaker"	Bonham, Jones, Page, Plant	3:50
4.	"Dazed and Confused"	Page (inspired by Holmes)	15:01
5.	"White Summer"/"Black Mountain Side"	Page	9:19
6.	"You Shook Me"	Dixon, Lenoir	11:56
7.	"Moby Dick"	Bonham, Jones, Page	9:51
8.	"How Many More Times"	Bonham, Jones, Page	10:43
Total length:			71:12

- Track 1 was 4:05 on the high-resolution and iTunes downloads including applause at the end of the track, before the album was released, and is now 3:52, segueing directly to track 2. It is unclear whether the shorter version corrects a mistake and/or is a time-saving measure.

=== Differences ===
While the Deluxe Edition are not studio outtakes, the differences of songs by format are listed below (differences will be from viewpoint of the Deluxe Edition tracks):

- "Good Times Bad Times" – Only intro riff is played, opening for the disc 2 track of "Good Times Bad Times/Communication Breakdown".
- "Babe I'm Gonna Leave You" – Not included.
- "You Shook Me" – Includes a vocal and guitar back-and-forth style part towards the end.
- "Dazed and Confused" – Has an extended bow section.
- "Your Time Is Gonna Come" – Not included.
- "Black Mountain Side" – Named "White Summer/Black Mountain Side" on the companion disc. Included as part of guitar medley "White Summer/Black Mountain Side".
- "Communication Breakdown" – Included after "Good Times Bad Times" intro riff, titled in disc 2 as "Good Times Bad Times/Communication Breakdown", and includes a short blues breakdown just before the finish.
- "I Can't Quit You Baby" – Intro is instrumental before the lyrics "I can't quit you...". Also see version below in Coda (Deluxe Edition).
- "How Many More Times" – Included.
- "Heartbreaker" – Included, but a Led Zeppelin II track.
- "Moby Dick" – Included in this version is a change in the intro riff, the first round of the riff is cut off by tuning, then it goes directly into the second round with short guitar solos, but a Led Zeppelin II track.

== Led Zeppelin II ==
Led Zeppelin II (Deluxe Edition)

Studio album by Led Zeppelin
- Released: 2 June 2014
- Recorded: 14 April – 25 June 1969, Olympic Studios, London, and Morgan Studios, Willesden, U.K., and A&R and Groove Sound Studio, N.Y.C., and Mirror Sound Studios, L.A.
- Genre: Hard rock, blues rock, heavy metal, folk rock
- Length: 74:17
- Label: Atlantic
- Producer: Jimmy Page

Led Zeppelin chronology
Led Zeppelin (Deluxe Edition) (2014)	Led Zeppelin II (Deluxe Edition) (2014)	Led Zeppelin III (Deluxe Edition) (2014)

Singles from Led Zeppelin II (Deluxe Edition)
- 1. "Whole Lotta Love (Rough Mix with Vocal)" Released: 5 May 2014

Led Zeppelin II (disc one)
No.	Title	Writer(s)	Length
1.	"Whole Lotta Love"	John Bonham, Willie Dixon, John Paul Jones, Jimmy Page, Robert Plant	5:34
2.	"What Is and What Should Never Be"	Page, Plant	4:46
3.	"The Lemon Song"	Bonham, Chester Burnett, Jones, Page, Plant	6:19
4.	"Thank You"	Page, Plant	4:49
5.	"Heartbreaker"	Bonham, Jones, Page, Plant	4:14
6.	"Living Loving Maid (She's Just a Woman)"	Page, Plant	2:39
7.	"Ramble On"	Page, Plant	4:34
8.	"Moby Dick"	Bonham, Jones, Page	4:20
9.	"Bring It On Home"	Dixon	4:19
Total length:			41:38

Companion Disc (disc two)
No.	Title	Writer(s)	Length
1.	"Whole Lotta Love" (Rough Mix with Vocal)	Bonham, Dixon, Jones, Page, Plant	5:38
2.	"What Is and What Should Never Be" (Rough Mix with Vocal)	Page, Plant	4:33
3.	"Thank You" (Backing Track)	Page, Plant	4:21
4.	"Heartbreaker" (Rough Mix with Vocal)	Bonham, Jones, Page, Plant	4:24
5.	"Living Loving Maid (She's Just a Woman)" (Backing Track)	Page, Plant	3:08
6.	"Ramble On" (Rough Mix with Vocal)	Page, Plant	4:43
7.	"Moby Dick" (Intro/Outro Rough Mix)	Bonham, Jones, Page	1:37
8.	"La La" (Backing Track)	Jones, Page	4:07
Total length:			32:39

=== Differences ===
The differences between each track is listed below (differences will be from viewpoint of the Deluxe Edition tracks):

- "Whole Lotta Love" – Different vocal track (back to original after solo section), breakdown section is much simpler, with much less theremin, no solo guitar track
- "What Is and What Should Never Be" – The "ah" vocal sung after "...and you will be mine, by taking our time." includes Robert Plant's voice, as opposed to only being the backing vocals.
- "The Lemon Song" – Not included.
- "Thank You" – No vocals, slightly different drum intro, cuts off at the false ending.
- "Heartbreaker" – Different guitar track for the first solo (before the drums and bass come in).
- "Living Loving Maid (She's Just a Woman)" – No vocals, the riff is extended for a longer time at the end of the song.
- "Ramble On" – There is no first or second solo, there is only vocal track at the end, the song is extended at the end.
- "Moby Dick" – There is no drum solo, only a count in, and there is an extra chord at the end.
- "Bring It On Home" – Not included in Led Zeppelin II (Deluxe Edition), see info below in Coda (Deluxe Edition)
- "La La" – Only in Deluxe Edition.

== Led Zeppelin III ==
Led Zeppelin III (Deluxe Edition)

Studio album by Led Zeppelin
- Released: 2 June 2014
- Recorded: 13 December 1969 and 29 May – 13 December 1970, Olympic Studios and Island Studios, London
- Genre: Folk rock, blues rock, hard rock
- Length: 84:38
- Label: Atlantic
- Producer: Jimmy Page

Led Zeppelin chronology
Led Zeppelin II (Deluxe Edition) (2014)	Led Zeppelin III (Deluxe Edition) (2014)	Led Zeppelin IV (Deluxe Edition) (2014)

Singles from Led Zeppelin III (Deluxe Edition)
- 1. "The Immigrant Song (Alternative Mix)" Released: 22 May 2014

Led Zeppelin III (disc one)
No.	Title	Writer(s)	Length
1.	"Immigrant Song"	Jimmy Page, Robert Plant	2:26
2.	"Friends"	Page, Plant	3:55
3.	"Celebration Day"	John Paul Jones, Page, Plant	3:29
4.	"Since I've Been Loving You"	Jones, Page, Plant	7:25
5.	"Out on the Tiles"	John Bonham, Page, Plant	4:04
6.	"Gallows Pole"	Traditional, arr. Page, Plant	4:58
7.	"Tangerine"	Page	3:12
8.	"That's the Way"	Page, Plant	5:38
9.	"Bron-Y-Aur Stomp"	Jones, Page, Plant	4:20
10.	"Hats Off to (Roy) Harper"	Traditional, arr. Charles Obscure	3:41
Total length:			43:09

Companion Disc (disc two)
No.	Title	Writer(s)	Length
1.	"The Immigrant Song" (Alternate Mix)	Page, Plant	2:25
2.	"Friends" (Track, No Vocal)	Page, Plant	3:43
3.	"Celebration Day" (Alternate Mix)	Jones, Page, Plant	3:18
4.	"Since I've Been Loving You" (Rough Mix of First Recording)	Jones, Page, Plant	7:16
5.	"Bathroom Sound" ("Out on the Tiles") (Track, No Vocal)	Bonham, Page, Plant	4:00
6.	"Gallows Pole" (Rough Mix)	Traditional, arr. Page, Plant	5:17
7.	"That's the Way" (Rough Mix with Dulcimer & Backwards Echo)	Page, Plant	5:22
8.	"Jennings Farm Blues" ("Bron-Y-Aur Stomp") (Rough Mix of All Guitar Overdubs That Day)	Jones, Page, Plant	5:54
9.	"Key to the Highway/Trouble in Mind" (Rough Mix)	Big Bill Broonzy, Charlie Segar, Richard M. Jones	4:05
Total length:			41:29

=== Differences ===
The differences between each track is listed below (differences will be from viewpoint of the Deluxe Edition tracks):

- "Immigrant Song" – Named "The Immigrant Song" on the companion disc. Less reverb, slightly different outro vocals.
- "Friends" – No vocal, no segue into "Celebration Day". Also see version below in Coda (Deluxe Edition).
- "Celebration Day" – No segue from "Friends", cut off from vocals, "If you walk you're gonna get there..."
- "Since I've Been Loving You" – Different take, slightly different lyrics. 6:59 to the end of the track was used on the normal studio version.
- "Out on the Tiles" – Named "Bathroom Sound" on the companion disc. The latter is the name for disc 2, no vocals, cut off slightly sooner.
- "Gallows Pole" – No mandolin, track extended.
- "Tangerine" – Not included.
- "That's the Way" – Original track had vari-speed to slow it down and lower it a half step. Fewer overdubs and effects on this version.
- "Bron-Y-Aur Stomp" – Named "Jennings Farm Blues" on the companion disc. An early version of "Bron-Y-Aur Stomp" that is electric and bluesy as opposed to acoustic and folky.
- "Hats Off to (Roy) Harper" – Not included.
- "Key to the Highway/Trouble in Mind" – Only in Deluxe Edition.

== Untitled (Led Zeppelin IV) ==
Led Zeppelin IV (Deluxe Edition)

Studio album by Led Zeppelin
- Released: 27 October 2014
- Recorded: 2 November 1970 – 19 May 1971 at Island Studios, London and Rolling Stones Mobile Studio at Headley Grange, England
- Genre: Hard rock, heavy metal, blues, rock and roll, folk
- Length: 83:06
- Label: Atlantic
- Producer: Jimmy Page

Led Zeppelin chronology
Led Zeppelin III (Deluxe Edition) (2014)	Led Zeppelin IV (Deluxe Edition) (2014)	Houses of the Holy (Deluxe Edition) (2014)

Singles from Led Zeppelin IV (Deluxe Edition)
- 1. "Black Dog (Basic Track with Guitar Overdubs)" Released: 4 September 2014; 2. "Rock and Roll (Alternate Mix)" Released: 16 October 2014

Led Zeppelin IV (disc one)
No.	Title	Writer(s)	Length
1.	"Black Dog"	John Paul Jones, Jimmy Page, Robert Plant	4:54
2.	"Rock and Roll"	John Bonham, Jones, Page, Plant	3:40
3.	"The Battle of Evermore"	Page, Plant	5:51
4.	"Stairway to Heaven"	Page, Plant	8:02
5.	"Misty Mountain Hop"	Jones, Page, Plant	4:38
6.	"Four Sticks"	Page, Plant	4:44
7.	"Going to California"	Page, Plant	3:31
8.	"When the Levee Breaks"	Bonham, Jones, Memphis Minnie, Page, Plant	7:07
Total length:			42:34

Companion Disc (disc two)
No.	Title	Writer(s)	Length
1.	"Black Dog" (Basic Track with Guitar Overdubs)	Jones, Page, Plant	4:34
2.	"Rock and Roll" (Alternate Mix)	Bonham, Jones, Page, Plant	3:39
3.	"The Battle of Evermore" (Mandolin/Guitar Mix From Headley Grange)	Page, Plant	4:13
4.	"Stairway to Heaven" (Sunset Sound Mix)	Page, Plant	8:03
5.	"Misty Mountain Hop" (Alternate Mix)	Jones, Page, Plant	4:45
6.	"Four Sticks" (Alternate Mix)	Page, Plant	4:33
7.	"Going to California" (Mandolin/Guitar Mix)	Page, Plant	3:34
8.	"When the Levee Breaks" (Alternate U.K. Mix)	Bonham, Jones, Minnie, Page, Plant	7:08
Total length:			40:32

=== Differences ===
The differences between each track is listed below (differences will be from viewpoint of the Deluxe Edition tracks):

- "Black Dog" – Single vocal track, no solo guitar track, fade out sooner.
- "Rock and Roll" – Fewer overdubs, slightly less reverb.
- "The Battle of Evermore" – No vocals, bridge in standard track becomes the outro.
- "Stairway to Heaven" – The flute track does not cross over into the middle section, the F-A-C-E-D-C riff guitar track is played directly after the solo as opposed to a few lines after. There are no harmony vocals in the last verse.
- "Misty Mountain Hop" – Track extends a few more seconds
- "Four Sticks" – Beginning of track includes a count-in of "1-2-3-4-5-6-1-2-3-1", cuts off earlier. Also see version below in Coda (Deluxe Edition) titled "Four Hands".
- "Going to California" – No vocals.
- "When the Levee Breaks" – One harmonica track removed. Also see version below in Coda (Deluxe Edition) titled "If It Keeps On Raining".

== Houses of the Holy ==
Houses of the Holy (Deluxe Edition)

Studio album by Led Zeppelin
- Released: 27 October 2014
- Recorded: 3 December 1971 and 12 April – 18 May 1972, Stargroves and Headley Grange with the Rolling Stones Mobile Studio, and Island Studios, London; Mixed at Olympic Studios, London and Electric Lady Studios, New York
- Genre: Hard rock
- Length: 77:07
- Label: Atlantic
- Producer: Jimmy Page

Led Zeppelin chronology
Led Zeppelin IV (Deluxe Edition) (2014)	Houses of the Holy (Deluxe Edition) (2014)	Physical Graffiti (Deluxe Edition) (2015)

Singles from Houses of the Holy (Deluxe Edition)
- 1. "The Rain Song (Mix Minus Piano)" Released: 30 September 2014

Houses of the Holy (disc one)
No.	Title	Writer(s)	Length
1.	"The Song Remains the Same"	Jimmy Page, Robert Plant	5:32
2.	"The Rain Song"	Page, Plant	7:39
3.	"Over the Hills and Far Away"	Page, Plant	4:50
4.	"The Crunge"	John Bonham, John Paul Jones, Page, Plant	3:17
5.	"Dancing Days"	Page, Plant	3:43
6.	"D'yer Mak'er"	Bonham, Jones, Page, Plant	4:23
7.	"No Quarter"	Jones, Page, Plant	7:00
8.	"The Ocean"	Bonham, Jones, Page, Plant	4:31
Total length:			40:57

Companion Disc (disc two)
No.	Title	Writer(s)	Length
1.	"The Song Remains the Same" (Guitar Overdub Reference Mix)	Page, Plant	5:29
2.	"The Rain Song" (Mix Minus Piano)	Page, Plant	7:45
3.	"Over the Hills and Far Away" (Guitar Mix Backing Track)	Page, Plant	4:22
4.	"The Crunge" (Rough Mix - Keys Up)	Bonham, Jones, Page, Plant	3:16
5.	"Dancing Days" (Rough Mix with Vocal)	Page, Plant	3:46
6.	"No Quarter" (Rough Mix with JPJ Keyboard Overdubs - No Vocal)	Jones, Page, Plant	7:03
7.	"The Ocean" (Working Mix)	Bonham, Jones, Page, Plant	4:26
Total length:			36:10

=== Differences ===
The differences between each track is listed below (differences will be from viewpoint of the Deluxe Edition tracks):

- "The Song Remains the Same" – No vocals, alternate guitar tracks.
- "The Rain Song" – Different mix.
- "Over the Hills and Far Away" – Mono guitar intro, no vocals, different outro.
- "The Crunge" – Different mix.
- "Dancing Days" – Different mix, bass more upfront.
- "D'yer Mak'er" – Not included.
- "No Quarter" – Lower pitched, slightly fewer overdubs, no vocals.
- "The Ocean" – Different mix, additional vocals.

== Physical Graffiti ==
Physical Graffiti (Deluxe Edition)

Studio album by Led Zeppelin
- Released: 23 February 2015
- Recorded: May – July 1970, December 1970 – January 1971, April – May 1972, 25 October 1973 and 15–28 February 1974, Olympic Studios and Island Studios, London and Rolling Stones Mobile Studio and Ronnie Lane's Mobile Studio at Headley Grange, England
- Genre: Hard rock, blues rock
- Length: 124:14
- Label: Swan Song
- Producer: Jimmy Page

Led Zeppelin chronology
Houses of the Holy (Deluxe Edition) (2014)	Physical Graffiti (Deluxe Edition) (2015)	Presence (Deluxe Edition) (2015)

Singles from Physical Graffiti (Deluxe Edition)
- 1. "Houses of the Holy (Rough Mix with Overdubs)" Released: 21 January 2015; 2. "Brandy & Coke (Trampled Under Foot – Initial Rough Mix)" Released: 11 February 2015

Physical Graffiti (disc one)
No.	Title	Writer(s)	Length
1.	"Custard Pie"	Jimmy Page, Robert Plant	4:15
2.	"The Rover"	Page, Plant	5:39
3.	"In My Time of Dying"	John Bonham, John Paul Jones, Page, and Plant	11:08
4.	"Houses of the Holy"	Page, Plant	4:04
5.	"Trampled Under Foot"	Jones, Page, and Plant	5:36
6.	"Kashmir"	Bonham, Page, and Plant	8:37

Physical Graffiti (disc two)
No.	Title	Writer(s)	Length
1.	"In the Light"	Jones, Page, and Plant	8:47
2.	"Bron-Yr-Aur"	Page	2:06
3.	"Down by the Seaside"	Page, Plant	5:15
4.	"Ten Years Gone"	Page, Plant	6:34
5.	"Night Flight"	Jones, Page, and Plant	3:38
6.	"The Wanton Song"	Page, Plant	4:08
7.	"Boogie with Stu"	Bonham, Jones, Page, Plant, Ian Stewart	3:52
8.	"Black Country Woman"	Page, Plant	4:24
9.	"Sick Again"	Page, Plant	4:42
Total length:			82:45

Companion Disc (disc three)
No.	Title	Writer(s)	Length
1.	"Brandy & Coke" ("Trampled Under Foot") (Initial/Rough Mix)	Jones, Page, Plant	5:38
2.	"Sick Again" (Early Version)	Page, Plant	2:22
3.	"In My Time of Dying" (Initial/Rough Mix)	Bonham, Jones, Page, Plant	10:48
4.	"Houses of the Holy" (Rough Mix with Overdubs)	Page, Plant	3:51
5.	"Everybody Makes It Through" ("In the Light") (Early Version/In Transit)	Jones, Page, Plant	6:29
6.	"Boogie with Stu" (Sunset Sound Mix)	Bonham, Jones, Page, Plant, Stewart	3:39
7.	"Driving Through Kashmir" ("Kashmir") (Rough Orchestra Mix)	Bonham, Page, Plant	8:39
Total length:			41:29

=== Differences ===
The differences between each track is listed below (differences will be from viewpoint of the Deluxe Edition tracks):

- "Custard Pie" – Not included.
- "The Rover" – Not included.
- "In My Time of Dying" – No guitar overdubs, most during solos around 5:00 and 6:30, as the solos are different
- "Houses of the Holy" – Cowbell and tambourine are more pronounced, at 1:22, 1:53, 2:26, 2:58. There is a vocal harmony at 2:00 and the vocals are clipped at 2:13. Also, the "hoo-hoo" backing vocals are more pronounced at 2:58.
- "Trampled Under Foot" – Named "Brandy and Coke" on the companion disc. Fewer guitar overdubs, no bass guitar and the drum track is brought forward more.
- "Kashmir" – Named "Driving Through Kashmir" on the companion disc. Orchestra is brought slightly more forward in the mix.
- "In the Light" – Named "Everybody Makes It Through" on the companion disc. It features a different structure and alternate lyrics. Also, a different clavinet riff is used in the opening and throughout the track. Also see info below in Coda (Deluxe Edition) for a rough mix version of "Everybody Makes It Through"
- "Bron-Yr-Aur" – Not included.
- "Down By the Seaside" – Not included.
- "Ten Years Gone" – Not included.
- "Night Flight" – Not included.
- "The Wanton Song" – Not included in Physical Graffiti (Deluxe Edition), see info below in Coda (Deluxe Edition) for track titled "Desire".
- "Boogie With Stu" – The mandolin "solo" used in the middle of the song is also used to open the track. Different stereo mix.
- "Black Country Woman" – Not included.
- "Sick Again" – No Vocals. This is a completely different version with Jimmy Page on bass guitar. Fewer guitar overdubs and the track is two minutes shorter.

== Presence ==
Presence (Deluxe Edition)

Studio album by Led Zeppelin
- Released: 31 July 2015
- Recorded: 12–20 November 1975, Musicland Studios, Munich, West Germany, mixed on 23 November 1975 at Musicland Studios
- Genre: Hard rock, blues rock, progressive rock
- Length: 75:57
- Label: Swan Song
- Producer: Jimmy Page

Led Zeppelin chronology
Physical Graffiti (Deluxe Edition) (2015)	Presence (Deluxe Edition) (2015)	In Through the Out Door (Deluxe Edition) (2015)

Singles from Presence (Deluxe Edition)
- 1. "Hots On for Nowhere (Reference Mix)" Released: 22 June 2015

All tracks written by Jimmy Page and Robert Plant, except "Royal Orleans" by John Bonham, John Paul Jones, Page, and Plant and "10 Ribs & All/Carrot Pod Pod (Pod)" by Jones and Page.

Presence (disc one)
No.	Title	Length
1.	"Achilles Last Stand"	10:25
2.	"For Your Life"	6:20
3.	"Royal Orleans"	2:59
4.	"Nobody's Fault but Mine"	6:16
5.	"Candy Store Rock"	4:07
6.	"Hots On for Nowhere"	4:43
7.	"Tea for One"	9:27
Total length:		44:25

Companion Disc (disc two)
No.	Title	Length
1.	"Two Ones Are Won" ("Achilles Last Stand") (Reference Mix)	10:28
2.	"For Your Life" (Reference Mix)	6:28
3.	"10 Ribs & All/Carrot Pod Pod" (Reference Mix)	6:49
4.	"Royal Orleans" (Reference Mix)	3:00
5.	"Hots On for Nowhere" (Reference Mix)	4:44
Total length:		31:32

=== Differences ===
The differences between each track is listed below (differences will be from viewpoint of the Deluxe Edition tracks):

- "Achilles Last Stand" – Named "Two Ones Are Won" on the companion disc. Rhythm of outro riff is different and a vocal track near the end removed.
- "For Your Life" – Vocals are doubled. No intro ad-lib. Around 3:15 to 3:33 there is additional ad-lib. Solo is different around 4:17 to 5:03.
- "10 Ribs & All/Carrot Pod Pod" – Only in Deluxe Edition.
- "Royal Orleans" – 'Dr. John' styled vocals by Robert Plant.
- "Nobody's Fault but Mine" – Not included.
- "Candy Store Rock" – Not included.
- "Hots On for Nowhere" – Version has no overdubs, final few seconds have additional lyrics.
- "Tea for One" – Not included.

== In Through the Out Door ==
In Through the Out Door (Deluxe Edition)

Studio album by Led Zeppelin
- Released: 31 July 2015
- Recorded: 15–23 November 1978, Polar Studios, Stockholm, Stockholm County, Sweden
- Genre: Rock
- Length: 84:54
- Label: Swan Song
- Producer: Jimmy Page

Led Zeppelin chronology
Presence (Deluxe Edition) (2015)	In Through the Out Door (Deluxe Edition) (2015)	Coda (Deluxe Edition) (2015)

Singles from In Through the Out Door (Deluxe Edition)
- 1. "In the Evening (Rough Mix)" Released: 8 July 2015

In Through the Out Door (disc one)
No.	Title	Writer(s)	Length
1.	"In the Evening"	John Paul Jones, Jimmy Page, Robert Plant	6:53
2.	"South Bound Saurez"	Jones, Plant	4:13
3.	"Fool in the Rain"	Jones, Page, Plant	6:10
4.	"Hot Dog"	Page, Plant	3:18
5.	"Carouselambra"	Jones, Page, Plant	10:34
6.	"All My Love"	Jones, Plant	5:53
7.	"I'm Gonna Crawl"	Jones, Page, Plant	5:29
Total length:			42:25

Companion Disc (disc two)
No.	Title	Writer(s)	Length
1.	"In the Evening" (Rough Mix)	Jones, Page, Plant	6:58
2.	"Southbound Piano" ("South Bound Saurez") (Rough Mix)	Jones, Plant	4:12
3.	"Fool in the Rain" (Rough Mix)	Jones, Page, Plant	6:10
4.	"Hot Dog" (Rough Mix)	Page, Plant	3:14
5.	"The Epic" ("Carouselambra") (Rough Mix)	Jones, Page, Plant	10:46
6.	"The Hook" ("All My Love") (Rough Mix)	Jones, Plant	5:52
7.	"Blot" ("I'm Gonna Crawl") (Rough Mix)	Jones, Page, Plant	5:30
Total length:			42:29

=== Differences ===
The differences between each track is listed below (differences will be from viewpoint of the Deluxe Edition tracks):

- "In the Evening" – Slightly different intro. Vocals are "dry" (whereas the 1979-issued mix has delay applied). A flute-like counter melody appears at approx. 4:30.
- "South Bound Saurez" – Named "Southbound Piano" on the companion disc. Piano and guitar are brought more forward in the mix.
- "Fool in the Rain" – Mono mix.
- "Hot Dog" – Piano and guitar are brought more forward in the mix.
- "Carouselambra" – Named "The Epic" on the companion disc. Fewer keyboard overdubs, the bass guitar is turned down slightly, and the guitar and vocals are brought more forward in the mix in the first portion of the song.
- "All My Love" – Named "The Hook" on the companion disc. Mono mix.
- "I'm Gonna Crawl" – Named "Blot" on the companion disc. Mono mix.

== Coda ==
Coda (Deluxe Edition)
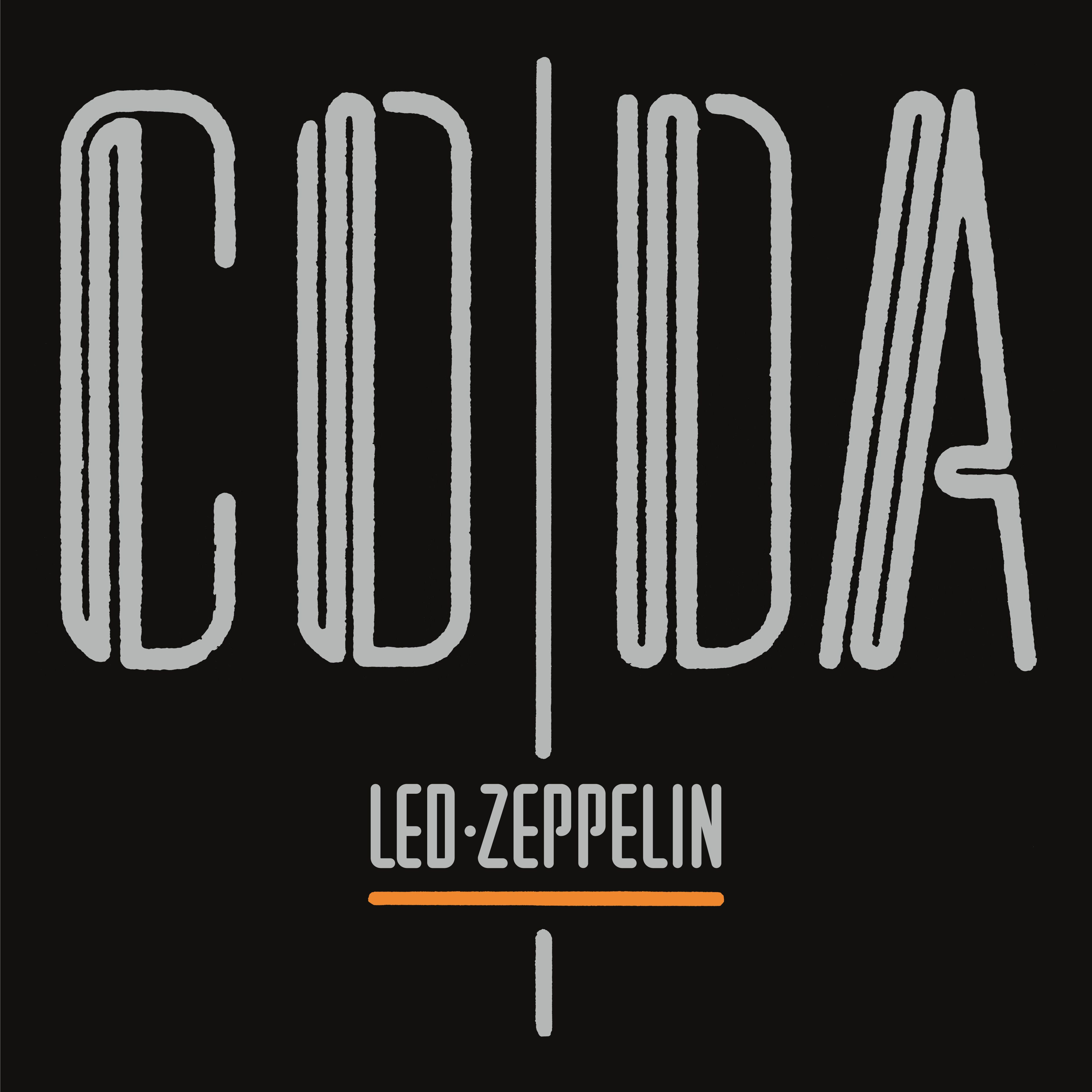

Compilation album by Led Zeppelin
- Released: 31 July 2015
- Recorded: 3–10 October 1968, 23 June 1969, 24 July 1969, 9 January 1970, 29 May – 5 July 1970, 11 November 1970, 6 May 1972, 19 October 1972, 15–28 February 1974, 12 September 1976, 14–21 November 1978, at Olympic Studios, London, Maida Vale studio, London, Atlantic Studios, New York, Royal Albert Hall, London, Island Studios, London, Stargroves and Headley Grange with the Ronnie Lane's Mobile Studio, England, Bombay, India, Mountain Studios, Montreux, Switzerland, and Polar Studios, Stockholm, Stockholm County, Sweden, overdubs 1982 at Sol Studios
- Genre: Rock
- Length: 97:06
- Label: Swan Song
- Producer: Jimmy Page

Led Zeppelin chronology
In Through the Out Door (Deluxe Edition) (2015)	Coda (Deluxe Edition) (2015)	The Complete BBC Sessions (2016)

Singles from Coda (Deluxe Edition)
- 1. "Sugar Mama (Mix)" Released: 8 June 2015; 2. "If It Keeps On Raining (When the Levee Breaks – Rough Mix)" Released: 23 July 2015

All tracks produced by Jimmy Page, except for "Travelling Riverside Blues", produced by John Walters.

Coda (disc one)
No.	Title	Writer(s)	Length
1.	"We're Gonna Groove"	James Bethea, Ben E. King	2:37
2.	"Poor Tom"	Jimmy Page, Robert Plant	3:02
3.	"I Can't Quit You Baby"	Willie Dixon	4:18
4.	"Walter's Walk"	Page, Plant	4:31
5.	"Ozone Baby"	Page, Plant	3:36
6.	"Darlene"	John Bonham, John Paul Jones, Page, Plant	5:06
7.	"Bonzo's Montreux"	Bonham	4:22
8.	"Wearing and Tearing"	Page, Plant	5:27
Total length:			33:04

Companion Disc One (disc two)
No.	Title	Writer(s)	Length
1.	"We're Gonna Groove" (Alternate Mix)	Bethea, King	2:40
2.	"If It Keeps On Raining" ("When the Levee Breaks") (Rough Mix)	Bonham, Jones, Memphis Minnie, Page, Plant	4:11
3.	"Bonzo's Montreux" (Mix Construction in Progress)	Bonham	4:57
4.	"Baby Come On Home"	Berns, Page, Plant	4:30
5.	"Sugar Mama" (Mix)	Page, Plant	2:50
6.	"Poor Tom" (Instrumental Mix)	Page, Plant	2:16
7.	"Travelling Riverside Blues" (BBC Session)	Johnson, Page, Plant	5:08
8.	"Hey, Hey, What Can I Do"	Bonham, Jones, Page, Plant	3:52

Companion Disc Two (disc three)
No.	Title	Writer(s)	Length
1.	"Four Hands" ("Four Sticks") (Bombay Orchestra)	Page, Plant	4:43
2.	"Friends" (Bombay Orchestra)	Page, Plant	4:25
3.	"St. Tristan's Sword" (Rough Mix)	Page	5:40
4.	"Desire" ("The Wanton Song") (Rough Mix)	Page, Plant	4:08
5.	"Bring It On Home" (Rough Mix)	Dixon	2:32
6.	"Walter's Walk" (Rough Mix)	Page, Plant	3:18
7.	"Everybody Makes It Through" ("In the Light") (Rough Mix)	Jones, Page, Plant	8:31
Total length:			64:02

The CD edition of the album incorrectly lists the running time of "Bring It On Home" (Rough Mix) as 4:19, which is actually the exact time of the finished version listed on Led Zeppelin II.

=== Differences ===
The differences between each track is listed below (differences will be from viewpoint of the Deluxe Edition tracks):

- "We're Gonna Groove" – More vocals. Differences in guitar takes starting around 1:15. Vocal addition around 1:30.
- "Poor Tom" – No vocals.
- "I Can't Quit You Baby" – Differs from Led Zeppelin track in format by having a longer drum outro.
- "Walter's Walk" – No vocals. Repeats intro at 1:15.
- "Ozone Baby" – Not included.
- "Darlene" – Not included.
- "Bonzo's Montreux" – A different construction of the original.
- "Wearing and Tearing" – Not included.
- "If It Keeps On Raining" – Early version of the Led Zeppelin IV track "When the Levee Breaks". This version is faster, has different lyrics, an intro that is accompanied by a bass riff, and is shorter by 3 minutes.
- "Baby Come On Home" – Originally included on 1993 Boxed Set 2 and the 1993 extended version of Coda from The Complete Studio Recordings and 2008 Definitive Collection.
- "Sugar Mama" – Led Zeppelin era recording, only on Deluxe Edition.
- "Travelling Riverside Blues" – Originally included on 1990 Boxed Set and the 1993 extended version of Coda from The Complete Studio Recordings and 2008 Definitive Collection. The track was also released separately from Coda as a part of the BBC Sessions.
- "Hey, Hey, What Can I Do" – Originally released on the b-side of the 1970 Led Zeppelin III single, "Immigrant Song." Later included on the 1993 extended version of Coda from The Complete Studio Recordings and 2008 Definitive Collection.
- "Four Hands" – A different version of the Led Zeppelin IV track "Four Sticks" played by Page and Plant along with the Bombay Orchestra.
- "Friends" – A different version of the Led Zeppelin III track played by Page and Plant along with the Bombay Orchestra.
- "St. Tristan's Sword" – Led Zeppelin III era recording, only on Deluxe Edition.
- "Desire" – Version of the Physical Graffiti track "The Wanton Song". Features John Paul Jones on clavinet, fewer overdubs and Plant's vocals are clearer.
- "Bring It On Home" – Version of the Led Zeppelin II track, strictly the middle part (not the blues cover intro/outro).
- "Everybody Makes It Through" – A conglomerate version of the Physical Graffiti (Deluxe Edition) vocal track with the drums and drone of the Physical Graffiti track "In the Light".

== Personnel ==
Led Zeppelin

- John Bonham – drums, timpani, gong, backing vocals on Led Zeppelin and Houses of the Holy
- John Paul Jones – Four and eight-string bass guitars, organ, keyboards, synthesizer, mandolin, recorders, harpsichord, Mellotron, backing vocals on Led Zeppelin, and Houses of the Holy, acoustic guitar on "The Battle of Evermore"
- Jimmy Page – acoustic, electric, and pedal steel guitar, banjo, theremin, backing vocals on Led Zeppelin, mandolin on "The Battle of Evermore", production
- Robert Plant – lead and overdubbed backing vocals, harmonica, acoustic guitar on "Boogie with Stu"

Additional musicians

- Sandy Denny – vocals on "The Battle of Evermore"
- Viram Jasani – tabla on "Black Mountain Side"
- Ian Stewart – piano on "Rock and Roll" and "Boogie with Stu"

Production

- Barrington Colby – illustrations
- Peter Corriston – design and package concept
- Cameron Crowe – liner notes
- John C. F. Davis – remastering
- Peter Hewitt-Dutton - Audio restoration
- Mike Doud – design and package concept
- Chris Dreja – photography
- Elliott Erwitt – photography
- BP Fallon – photography
- Peter Grant – executive producer on original recordings
- Ross Halfin – photo research
- George Hardie – cover design
- Roy Harper – photography
- Dave Heffernan – illustrations
- David Juniper – artwork
- Maurice Tate – photo tinting
- Jeremy Gee – tape engineering (on Presence)
- George Hardie – sleeve design (on Presence)
- Keith Harwood – engineering, mixing (on Presence)
- Hipgnosis – sleeve design (on Houses of the Holy, Presence, In Through the Out Door, and Coda)
- Jeff Ocheltree – drum tech with John Bonham (on In Through the Out Door)
- Leif Mases – engineering (on In Through the Out Door)
- Lennart Östlund – assistant engineering (on In Through the Out Door)
- Stuart Epps – engineering (on Coda)
- Andy Johns – engineering (on Coda)
- Eddie Kramer – engineering (on Coda)
- Vic Maile – engineering (on Coda)
- Leif Masses – engineering (on Coda)
- John Timperley – engineering (on Coda)
- Studio Fury – Deluxe edition cover design
