= Led Zeppelin (disambiguation) =

Led Zeppelin were an English rock band that formed in 1968.

Led Zeppelin may also refer to:

- Led Zeppelin (album)
- Led Zeppelin Boxed Set
- Led Zeppelin DVD

== See also ==
- Led Zeppelin II
- Led Zeppelin III
- Led Zeppelin IV
- Led Zeppelin Boxed Set 2
- Led Zeppelin discography
- Led Zeppelin Remasters
- "Led Zep", a song by Blonde Redhead from In an Expression of the Inexpressible
- “Led Zeppelin”, a song by Tame Impala from Lonerism
