= Led Zeppelin Definitive Collection =

Led Zeppelin Definitive Collection of Mini-LP Replica CDs Boxed Set
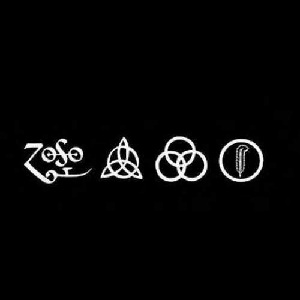

Box set by Led Zeppelin
- Released: 4 November 2008
- Recorded: October 1968 – December 1978
- Genres: Hard rock; heavy metal; blues rock; folk rock
- Length: 568:05
- Label: Atlantic/Rhino Entertainment
- Producer: Jimmy Page

Led Zeppelin chronology
| Mothership (2007) | Led Zeppelin Definitive Collection of Mini-LP Replica CDs Boxed Set (2008) | Celebration Day (2012) |

Professional ratings
Review scores
| Source | Rating |
|---|---|
| AllMusic | 4.5/5 stars |

The Definitive Collection of Mini-LP Replica CDs Boxed Set is a compilation of 12 compact discs featuring albums by the English rock group Led Zeppelin. It was distributed by Atlantic Records in collaboration with Rhino Entertainment on 4 November 2008. This collection comprises all nine of Led Zeppelin's original studio albums that have been digitally remastered. Additionally, it includes previously unreleased tracks that were initially part of the 1990 Boxed Set, now presented on disc 12. The set also encompasses the two-disc remastered edition of the film soundtrack The Song Remains the Same, incorporating bonus tracks. The albums are organized chronologically and each is presented in miniature replica sleeves mimicking the original vinyl releases. Prior to this boxed set, these replica CDs were only obtainable as separate releases in Japan. An exclusive Japanese deluxe boxed set was initially offered from 10 September 2008, and was limited to 5,000 copies in the SHM-CD format.

The album cover is simply a black background with the band's four symbols from their untitled fourth album in white: "Zoso" for Jimmy Page, a circle with a triquetra for John Paul Jones, three interlocking rings for John Bonham, and a feather inscribed in a circle for Robert Plant.

The miniature replica sleeves have diligently endeavored to preserve the original artwork and functionality of the initial vinyl releases. In line with this, the sleeves and CD labels only detail the songs that were originally released, excluding the bonus tracks from the packaging.

== Track listing ==
Led Zeppelin (disc one)
| No. | Title | Writer(s) | Length |
|---|---|---|---|
| 1. | "Good Times Bad Times" | John Bonham, John Paul Jones, and Jimmy Page | 2:44 |
| 2. | "Babe I'm Gonna Leave You" | Anne Bredon, Page, and Robert Plant | 6:40 |
| 3. | "You Shook Me" | Willie Dixon and J. B. Lenoir | 6:30 |
| 4. | "Dazed and Confused" | Page (inspired by Jake Holmes) | 6:26 |
| 5. | "Your Time Is Gonna Come" | Jones and Page | 4:41 |
| 6. | "Black Mountain Side" | Page | 2:13 |
| 7. | "Communication Breakdown" | Bonham, Jones, and Page | 2:29 |
| 8. | "I Can't Quit You Baby" | Dixon | 4:43 |
| 9. | "How Many More Times" | Bonham, Jones, and Page | 8:28 |

Led Zeppelin II (disc two)
| No. | Title | Writer(s) | Length |
|---|---|---|---|
| 1. | "Whole Lotta Love" | Bonham, Dixon, Jones, Page, and Plant | 5:34 |
| 2. | "What Is and What Should Never Be" | Page and Plant | 4:45 |
| 3. | "The Lemon Song" | Bonham, Jones, Page, and Plant | 6:19 |
| 4. | "Thank You" | Page and Plant | 4:49 |
| 5. | "Heartbreaker" | Bonham, Jones, Page, and Plant | 4:14 |
| 6. | "Living Loving Maid (She's Just a Woman)" | Page and Plant | 2:39 |
| 7. | "Ramble On" | Page and Plant | 4:24 |
| 8. | "Moby Dick" | Bonham, Jones, and Page | 4:20 |
| 9. | "Bring It On Home" | Page and Plant | 4:21 |

Led Zeppelin III (disc three)
| No. | Title | Writer(s) | Length |
|---|---|---|---|
| 1. | "Immigrant Song" | Page and Plant | 2:25 |
| 2. | "Friends" | Page and Plant | 3:54 |
| 3. | "Celebration Day" | Jones, Page, and Plant | 3:29 |
| 4. | "Since I've Been Loving You" | Jones, Page, and Plant | 7:23 |
| 5. | "Out on the Tiles" | Bonham, Page, and Plant | 4:06 |
| 6. | "Gallows Pole" | traditional, arr. Page and Plant | 4:56 |
| 7. | "Tangerine" | Page | 3:10 |
| 8. | "That's the Way" | Page and Plant | 5:37 |
| 9. | "Bron-Y-Aur Stomp" | Jones, Page, and Plant | 4:16 |
| 10. | "Hats Off to (Roy) Harper" | traditional | 3:42 |

untitled [a.k.a. Led Zeppelin IV] (disc four)
| No. | Title | Writer(s) | Length |
|---|---|---|---|
| 1. | "Black Dog" | Jones, Page, and Plant | 4:57 |
| 2. | "Rock and Roll" | Bonham, Jones, Page, and Plant | 3:40 |
| 3. | "The Battle of Evermore" | Page and Plant | 5:52 |
| 4. | "Stairway to Heaven" | Page and Plant | 8:02 |
| 5. | "Misty Mountain Hop" | Jones, Page, and Plant | 4:38 |
| 6. | "Four Sticks" | Page and Plant | 4:46 |
| 7. | "Going to California" | Page and Plant | 3:31 |
| 8. | "When the Levee Breaks" | Jones, Memphis Minnie, Page, and Plant | 7:07 |

Houses of the Holy (disc five)
| No. | Title | Writer(s) | Length |
|---|---|---|---|
| 1. | "The Song Remains the Same" | Page and Plant | 5:32 |
| 2. | "The Rain Song" | Page and Plant | 7:39 |
| 3. | "Over the Hills and Far Away" | Page and Plant | 4:50 |
| 4. | "The Crunge" | Bonham, Jones, Page, and Plant | 3:17 |
| 5. | "Dancing Days" | Page and Plant | 3:43 |
| 6. | "D'yer Mak'er" | Bonham, Jones, Page, and Plant | 4:23 |
| 7. | "No Quarter" | Jones, Page, and Plant | 7:00 |
| 8. | "The Ocean" | Bonham, Jones, Page, and Plant | 4:31 |

Physical Graffiti [1] (disc six)
| No. | Title | Writer(s) | Length |
|---|---|---|---|
| 1. | "Custard Pie" | Page and Plant | 4:13 |
| 2. | "The Rover" | Page and Plant | 5:37 |
| 3. | "In My Time of Dying" | Bonham, Jones, Page, and Plant | 11:05 |
| 4. | "Houses of the Holy" | Page and Plant | 4:02 |
| 5. | "Trampled Under Foot" | Jones, Page, and Plant | 5:37 |
| 6. | "Kashmir" | Bonham, Page, and Plant | 8:33 |

Physical Graffiti [2] (disc seven)
| No. | Title | Writer(s) | Length |
|---|---|---|---|
| 1. | "In the Light" | Jones, Page, and Plant | 8:46 |
| 2. | "Bron-Yr-Aur" | Page | 2:06 |
| 3. | "Down by the Seaside" | Page and Plant | 5:13 |
| 4. | "Ten Years Gone" | Page and Plant | 6:32 |
| 5. | "Night Flight" | Jones, Page, and Plant | 3:36 |
| 6. | "The Wanton Song" | Page and Plant | 4:07 |
| 7. | "Boogie with Stu" | Bonham, Jones, Page, Plant, Ian Stewart, Mrs. Valens | 3:53 |
| 8. | "Black Country Woman" | Page and Plant | 4:24 |
| 9. | "Sick Again" | Page and Plant | 4:42 |

Presence (disc eight)
| No. | Title | Writer(s) | Length |
|---|---|---|---|
| 1. | "Achilles Last Stand" | Page and Plant | 10:25 |
| 2. | "For Your Life" | Page and Plant | 6:24 |
| 3. | "Royal Orleans" | Bonham, Jones, Page, and Plant | 2:58 |
| 4. | "Nobody's Fault but Mine" | Page and Plant | 6:27 |
| 5. | "Candy Store Rock" | Page and Plant | 4:11 |
| 6. | "Hots On for Nowhere" | Page and Plant | 4:43 |
| 7. | "Tea for One" | Page and Plant | 9:27 |

The Song Remains the Same [1] (disc nine)*
| No. | Title | Writer(s) | Length |
|---|---|---|---|
| 1. | "Rock and Roll" | Bonham, Jones, Page, and Plant | 3:56 |
| 2. | "Celebration Day" | Jones, Page, and Plant | 3:37 |
| 3. | "Black Dog" (with "Bring It On Home" intro)" | Bonham, Jones, Page, and Plant | 3:46 |
| 4. | "Over the Hills and Far Away" | Page and Plant | 6:11 |
| 5. | "Misty Mountain Hop" | Jones, Page, and Plant | 4:43 |
| 6. | "Since I've Been Loving You" | Jones, Page, and Plant | 8:23 |
| 7. | "No Quarter" | Jones, Page, and Plant | 10:38 |
| 8. | "The Song Remains the Same" | Page and Plant | 5:39 |
| 9. | "The Rain Song" | Page and Plant | 8:20 |
| 10. | "The Ocean" | Bonham, Jones, Page, and Plant | 5:13 |

The Song Remains the Same [2] (disc ten)**
| No. | Title | Writer(s) | Length |
|---|---|---|---|
| 1. | "Dazed and Confused" | Page | 29:18 |
| 2. | "Stairway to Heaven" | Page and Plant | 10:52 |
| 3. | "Moby Dick" | Bonham, Jones, and Page | 11:02 |
| 4. | "Heartbreaker" | Bonham, Jones, Page, and Plant | 6:19 |
| 5. | "Whole Lotta Love" | Bonham, Dixon, Jones, Page, and Plant | 13:51 |

In Through the Out Door (disc eleven)
| No. | Title | Writer(s) | Length |
|---|---|---|---|
| 1. | "In the Evening" | Jones, Page, and Plant | 6:49 |
| 2. | "South Bound Saurez" | Jones and Plant | 4:12 |
| 3. | "Fool in the Rain" | Jones, Page, and Plant | 6:12 |
| 4. | "Hot Dog" | Page and Plant | 3:17 |
| 5. | "Carouselambra" | Jones, Page, and Plant | 10:32 |
| 6. | "All My Love" | Jones and Plant | 5:51 |
| 7. | "I'm Gonna Crawl" | Jones, Page, and Plant | 5:30 |

Coda (disc twelve)***
| No. | Title | Writer(s) | Length |
|---|---|---|---|
| 1. | "We're Gonna Groove" | James A. Bethea and Ben E. King | 2:40 |
| 2. | "Poor Tom" | Page and Plant | 3:03 |
| 3. | "I Can't Quit You Baby" | Dixon | 4:17 |
| 4. | "Walter's Walk" | Page and Plant | 4:31 |
| 5. | "Ozone Baby" | Page and Plant | 3:35 |
| 6. | "Darlene" | Bonham, Jones, Page, and Plant | 5:06 |
| 7. | "Bonzo's Montreux" | Bonham | 4:17 |
| 8. | "Wearing and Tearing" | Page and Plant | 5:31 |
| 9. | "Baby Come On Home" (Recorded 1968, appeared on Boxed Set 2, 1993) | Bert Berns, Page, and Plant | 4:30 |
| 10. | "Travelling Riverside Blues" (Recorded 1969, appeared on Boxed Set, 1990) | Robert Johnson, Page, and Plant | 5:11 |
| 11. | "White Summer/Black Mountain Side" (Recorded 1969, appeared on Boxed Set, 1990) | Page | 8:01 |
| 12. | "Hey, Hey, What Can I Do" (Recorded 1970; B-side to the "Immigrant Song" single, 1970) | Bonham, Jones, Page, and Plant | 3:55 |

Notes
(*) Includes five bonus tracks: "Black Dog" (with "Bring It On Home" intro), "Over the Hills and Far Away", "Misty Mountain Hop", "Since I've Been Loving You", and "The Ocean".
(**) Includes one bonus track: "Heartbreaker".
(***) Includes four bonus tracks: "Baby Come On Home", "Travelling Riverside Blues", "White Summer"/"Black Mountain Side", and "Hey, Hey, What Can I Do".

- The album is rated G in New Zealand.

== Personnel ==
Led Zeppelin

- John Bonham – drums, timpani, gong, backing vocals on Disc 1
- John Paul Jones – bass guitar, organ, keyboards, synthesizer, mandolin, recorders, harpsichord, Mellotron, backing vocals on Disc 1, acoustic guitar on "The Battle of Evermore"
- Jimmy Page – acoustic, electric, and pedal steel guitar, banjo, theremin, backing vocals on Disc 1, mandolin on "The Battle of Evermore", production
- Robert Plant – lead and overdubbed backing vocals, harmonica, acoustic guitar on "Boogie with Stu"

Additional musicians

- Sandy Denny – vocals on "The Battle of Evermore"
- Viram Jasani – tabla on "Black Mountain Side"
- Ian Stewart – piano on "Rock and Roll" and "Boogie with Stu"

Production

- Barrington Colby – illustrations
- Peter Corriston – design and package concept
- Cameron Crowe – liner notes
- John C. F. Davis – remastering
- Mike Doud – design and package concept
- Chris Dreja – photography
- Elliott Erwitt – photography
- BP Fallon – photography
- Peter Grant – executive producer on original recordings
- Ross Halfin – photo research
- George Hardie – cover design
- Roy Harper – photography
- Dave Heffernan – illustrations
- David Juniper – artwork
- Maurice Tate – photo tinting

== Chart positions ==
Sales chart performance for Led Zeppelin Definitive Collection
| Chart (2008) | Peak Position |
|---|---|
| Japanese Albums Chart | 23 |

== Release history ==
Release formats for Led Zeppelin Definitive Collection
| Region | Date | Label | Format | Catalog # |
|---|---|---|---|---|
| Japan | 10 September 2008 | WEA Japan | Compact disc (boxed set) | 13142-53 |
| United States | 4 November 2008 | Atlantic Records/Rhino Entertainment | Compact disc (boxed set) | 513820 |
