= The Complete Studio Recordings (Led Zeppelin album) =

Box set by Led Zeppelin
- Released: 18 October 1993
- Recorded: October 1968 – December 1978
- Genres: Hard rock; heavy metal; blues rock; folk rock
- Length: 436:10
- Label: Atlantic
- Producer: Jimmy Page
- Compiler: Jimmy Page

Led Zeppelin compilations chronology
Led Zeppelin Boxed Set 2 (1993)	The Complete Studio Recordings (1993)	BBC Sessions (1997)

Professional ratings
Review scores
Source	Rating
AllMusic	3/5 stars
The Encyclopedia of Popular Music	4/5 stars

The Complete Studio Recordings is a ten compact disc box set by the English rock group Led Zeppelin, released by Atlantic Records on 18 October 1993. It contains all nine of the original Led Zeppelin studio albums digitally remastered, plus an expanded version of the posthumous release Coda. The discs are physically paired together in double-disc booklets and arranged in chronological order, with the exception of Presence (placed between Houses of the Holy and Physical Graffiti) being paired with Houses of the Holy in order to keep the two discs of Physical Graffiti together in the same case.

Four bonus tracks were added to the Coda disc. These were the previously unreleased "Baby Come On Home" which had appeared on Led Zeppelin Boxed Set 2 (1993), along with the previously unreleased tracks that had surfaced on the 1990 box set: "Travelling Riverside Blues" and "White Summer/Black Mountain Side", as well as the "Immigrant Song" B-side "Hey, Hey, What Can I Do". This expanded version of Coda created for the box set was also later released to digital stores in 2007 with the digital release of the full Led Zeppelin catalog, but with "Travelling Riverside Blues" omitted due to it already being included in BBC Sessions (1997).

The set also includes a booklet featuring an extended essay by rock journalist Cameron Crowe and photos of the band.

The album cover depicts the inside structure of a zeppelin.

This title was discontinued just prior to the launch of Mothership, and is now superseded by the Definitive Collection Mini LP Replica CD Boxset, released in September 2008.

== Track listing ==
Led Zeppelin (disc one)
No.	Title	Writer(s)	Length
1.	"Good Times Bad Times"	John Bonham, John Paul Jones, and Jimmy Page	2:47
2.	"Babe I'm Gonna Leave You"	Anne Bredon, Page, and Robert Plant	6:41
3.	"You Shook Me"	Willie Dixon and J. B. Lenoir	6:30
4.	"Dazed and Confused"	Page (inspired by Jake Holmes)	6:27
5.	"Your Time Is Gonna Come"	Jones and Page	4:41
6.	"Black Mountain Side"	Page	2:13
7.	"Communication Breakdown"	Bonham, Jones, and Page	2:30
8.	"I Can't Quit You Baby"	Dixon	4:43
9.	"How Many More Times"	Bonham, Jones, and Page	8:28

Led Zeppelin II (disc two)
No.	Title	Writer(s)	Length
1.	"Whole Lotta Love"	Bonham, Dixon, Jones, Page, and Robert Plant	5:34
2.	"What Is and What Should Never Be"	Page and Plant	4:47
3.	"The Lemon Song"	Bonham, Jones, Page, and Plant	6:22
4.	"Thank You"	Page and Plant	4:50
5.	"Heartbreaker"	Bonham, Jones, Page, and Plant	4:15
6.	"Living Loving Maid (She's Just a Woman)"	Page and Plant	2:40
7.	"Ramble On"	Page and Plant	4:36
8.	"Moby Dick"	Bonham, Jones, and Page	4:22
9.	"Bring It On Home"	Page and Plant	4:20

Led Zeppelin III (disc three)
No.	Title	Writer(s)	Length
1.	"Immigrant Song"	Page and Plant	2:26
2.	"Friends"	Page and Plant	3:55
3.	"Celebration Day"	Jones, Page, and Plant	3:29
4.	"Since I've Been Loving You"	Jones, Page, and Plant	7:25
5.	"Out on the Tiles"	Bonham, Page, and Plant	4:08
6.	"Gallows Pole"	traditional, arr. Page and Plant	4:58
7.	"Tangerine"	Page	3:12
8.	"That's the Way"	Page and Plant	5:39
9.	"Bron-Y-Aur Stomp"	Jones, Page, and Plant	4:20
10.	"Hats Off to (Roy) Harper"	traditional, arr. Charles Obscure	3:42

(Untitled) [aka Led Zeppelin IV] (disc four)
No.	Title	Writer(s)	Length
1.	"Black Dog"	Jones, Page, and Plant	4:57
2.	"Rock and Roll"	Bonham, Jones, Page, and Plant	3:40
3.	"The Battle of Evermore"	Page and Plant	5:52
4.	"Stairway to Heaven"	Page and Plant	8:02
5.	"Misty Mountain Hop"	Jones, Page, and Plant	4:38
6.	"Four Sticks"	Page and Plant	4:46
7.	"Going to California"	Page and Plant	3:31
8.	"When the Levee Breaks"	Jones, Memphis Minnie, Page, and Plant	7:07

Houses of the Holy (disc five)
No.	Title	Writer(s)	Length
1.	"The Song Remains the Same"	Page and Plant	5:32
2.	"The Rain Song"	Page and Plant	7:39
3.	"Over the Hills and Far Away"	Page and Plant	4:50
4.	"The Crunge"	Bonham, Jones, Page, and Plant	3:17
5.	"Dancing Days"	Page and Plant	3:43
6.	"D'yer Mak'er"	Bonham, Jones, Page, and Plant	4:23
7.	"No Quarter"	Jones, Page, and Plant	7:00
8.	"The Ocean"	Bonham, Jones, Page, and Plant	4:31

Presence (disc six)
No.	Title	Writer(s)	Length
1.	"Achilles Last Stand"	Page and Plant	10:25
2.	"For Your Life"	Page and Plant	6:24
3.	"Royal Orleans"	Bonham, Jones, Page, and Plant	2:58
4.	"Nobody's Fault but Mine"	Page and Plant	6:27
5.	"Candy Store Rock"	Page and Plant	4:11
6.	"Hots On for Nowhere"	Page and Plant	4:43
7.	"Tea for One"	Page and Plant	9:27

Physical Graffiti [1] (disc seven)
No.	Title	Writer(s)	Length
1.	"Custard Pie"	Page and Plant	4:13
2.	"The Rover"	Page and Plant	5:37
3.	"In My Time of Dying"	Bonham, Jones, Page, and Plant	11:05
4.	"Houses of the Holy"	Page and Plant	4:02
5.	"Trampled Under Foot"	Jones, Page, and Plant	5:37
6.	"Kashmir"	Bonham, Page, and Plant	8:33

Physical Graffiti [2] (disc eight)
No.	Title	Writer(s)	Length
1.	"In the Light"	Jones, Page, and Plant	8:46
2.	"Bron-Yr-Aur"	Page	2:06
3.	"Down by the Seaside"	Page and Plant	5:13
4.	"Ten Years Gone"	Page and Plant	6:32
5.	"Night Flight"	Jones, Page, and Plant	3:36
6.	"The Wanton Song"	Page and Plant	4:07
7.	"Boogie with Stu"	Bonham, Jones, Page, Plant, Ian Stewart, Mrs. Valens	3:53
8.	"Black Country Woman"	Page and Plant	4:24
9.	"Sick Again"	Page and Plant	4:42

In Through the Out Door (disc nine)
No.	Title	Writer(s)	Length
1.	"In the Evening"	Jones, Page, and Plant	6:49
2.	"South Bound Saurez"	Jones and Plant	4:12
3.	"Fool in the Rain"	Jones, Page, and Plant	6:12
4.	"Hot Dog"	Page and Plant	3:17
5.	"Carouselambra"	Jones, Page, and Plant	10:32
6.	"All My Love"	Jones and Plant	5:51
7.	"I'm Gonna Crawl"	Jones, Page, and Plant	5:30

Coda (disc ten)
No.	Title	Writer(s)	Length
1.	"We're Gonna Groove"	James Bethea and Ben E. King	2:40
2.	"Poor Tom"	Page and Plant	3:03
3.	"I Can't Quit You Baby"	Dixon	4:17
4.	"Walter's Walk"	Page and Plant	4:31
5.	"Ozone Baby"	Page and Plant	3:35
6.	"Darlene"	Bonham, Jones, Page, and Plant	5:06
7.	"Bonzo's Montreux"	Bonham	4:17
8.	"Wearing and Tearing"	Page and Plant	5:31
9.	"Baby Come On Home" (recorded 1968, appeared on Boxed Set 2, 1993)	Berns, Page, and Plant	4:30
10.	"Travelling Riverside Blues" (recorded 1969, appeared on Boxed Set, 1990, and BBC Sessions, 1997)	Johnson, Page, and Plant	5:11
11.	"White Summer/Black Mountain Side" (recorded live in June 1969, appeared on Boxed Set, 1990)	Page	8:01
12.	"Hey, Hey, What Can I Do" (recorded 1970, b-side to "Immigrant Song" single, 1970 / also appeared on Boxed Set, 1990)	Bonham, Jones, Page, and Plant	3:55

== Personnel ==
Led Zeppelin

- John Bonham – drums, percussion
- John Paul Jones – bass guitar, keyboards, mandolin
- Jimmy Page – acoustic and electric guitars, production
- Robert Plant – vocals, harmonica

Additional musicians

- Sandy Denny – vocals on "The Battle of Evermore"
- Viram Jasani – tabla on "Black Mountain Side"
- Ian Stewart – piano on "Rock and Roll" and "Boogie with Stu"

Production

- Yves Beauvais – production
- Chuck Boyd – photography
- Peter Corriston – design and package concept
- Cameron Crowe – liner notes
- Richard Creamer – photography
- Jim Cummins – photography
- Mike Doud – design
- Chris Dreja – photography
- Elliott Erwitt – photography
- BP Fallon – photography
- Peter Grant – executive producer
- Jeff Griffin – production
- George Hardie – cover design
- Roy Harper – photography
- David Juniper – artwork and design
- George Marino – mastering
- Jim Marshall – photography
- Barry Plummer – photography
- Neal Preston – photography
- Michael Putland – photography
- Zal Schreiber – editing
- Eric Spillman – art direction and design
- Jay Thompson – photography
- Neil Zlozower – photography

== Certifications ==
Certifications for The Complete Studio Recordings
Region	Certification	Certified units/sales
United States (RIAA)	2× Platinum	200,000^{^}
^{^} Shipments figures based on certification alone.

== Release history ==
Release formats for The Complete Studio Recordings
Region	Date	Label	Format	Catalog #
United Kingdom	18 October 1993	Atlantic Records	Compact disc (box set)	
