= The Girl I Love She Got Long Black Wavy Hair =

Single by Led Zeppelin

from the album BBC Sessions
- B-side: "Whole Lotta Love" (medley)
- Released: 11 November 1997
- Recorded: 16 June 1969
- Studio: Aeolian Hall (Studio 2), London
- Genre: Hard rock; blues rock
- Length: 3:00
- Label: Atlantic
- Songwriters: John Bonham; Sleepy John Estes; John Paul Jones; Jimmy Page; Robert Plant; Willie Dixon; Robert Johnson
- Producer: Jimmy Page

Led Zeppelin singles chronology
"Baby Come On Home" (1993)	"The Girl I Love She Got Long Black Wavy Hair" (1997)	"Rock and Roll (Sunset Sound mix)" (2018)

"The Girl I Love She Got Long Black Wavy Hair" (also known as "The Girl I Love") is a song performed by English rock band Led Zeppelin. It was recorded by the BBC on 16 June 1969 for Chris Grant's Tasty Pop Sundae show during the band's UK Tour of Summer 1969 and was broadcast on 22 June 1969. The song was later included on the live Led Zeppelin album BBC Sessions, released in 1997. It is the only known performance of the song by the band.

The lyrics in the first verse are an adaptation of the 1929 blues recording "The Girl I Love She Got Long Curley Hair" by Sleepy John Estes. The 2016 remastered edition of The Complete BBC Sessions includes "Contains interpolations from "Let Me Love You Baby" by Willie Dixon [and] "Travelling Riverside Blues" by Robert Johnson" in the credits for the song.

1997 singles charts
Chart	Peak position
US Billboard Mainstream Rock Tracks Chart	4
Canadian RPM Alternative 30 Chart	4
Canadian RPM Top 100 Chart	49
