= Coda (Led Zeppelin album) =

1982 album by Led Zeppelin

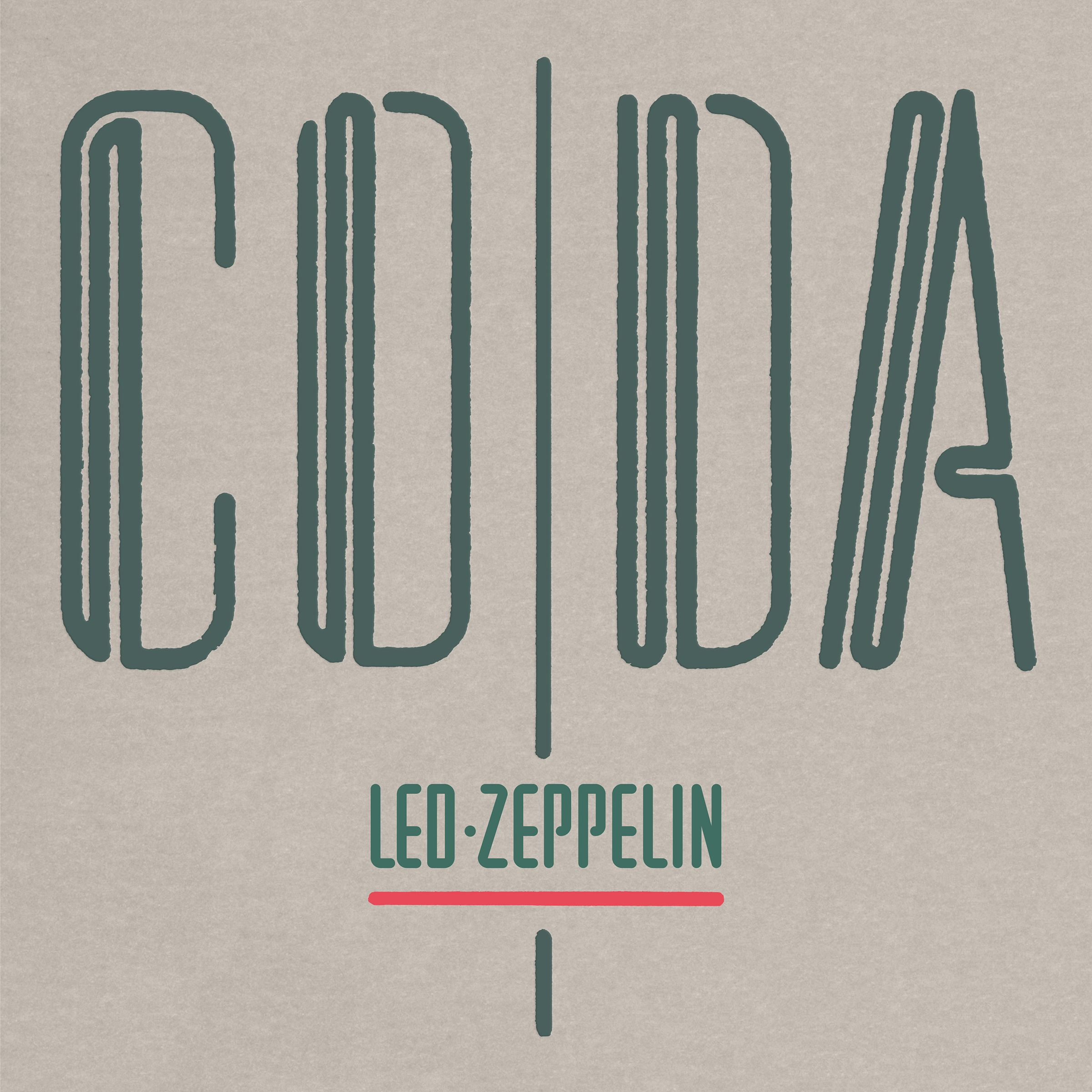

Studio album / compilation album by Led Zeppelin
- Released: 26 November 1982
- Recorded: 1968–1981
- Genre: Hard rock
- Length: 32:59
- Label: Swan Song
- Producer: Jimmy Page

Led Zeppelin chronology
In Through the Out Door (1979)	Coda (1982)	Led Zeppelin Boxed Set (1990)

Coda is the ninth and final studio album, as well as the first compilation album, by the English rock band Led Zeppelin. It is a collection of rejected and live tracks from various sessions during the band's twelve-year career. The album was released on 26 November 1982, almost two years after the group had officially disbanded following the death of drummer John Bonham. In 2015, a remastered version of the entire album with two discs of additional material was released.

== Background ==
The fifth Swan Song Records album for the band, Coda was released to honour contractual commitments to Atlantic Records and also to cover tax demands on previous monies earned. It cleared away nearly all of the leftover tracks from the various studio sessions of the 1960s and 1970s. The album was a collection of eight tracks spanning the length of Zeppelin's twelve-year history. Atlantic counted the release as a studio album, as Swan Song had owed the label a final studio album from the band. According to Martin Popoff, "there's conjecture that Jimmy [Page] called 'We're Gonna Groove' a studio track and 'I Can't Quit You Baby' a rehearsal track because Swan Song owed Atlantic one more studio album specifically."

Guitarist Jimmy Page explained that part of the reasoning for the album's release related to the popularity of unofficial Led Zeppelin recordings, which continued to be circulated by fans: "Coda was released, basically, because there was so much bootleg stuff out. We thought, "Well, if there's that much interest, then we may as well put the rest of our studio stuff out". As John Paul Jones recalled: "Basically there wasn't a lot of Zeppelin tracks that didn't go out. We used everything."

The word coda, meaning a passage that ends a musical piece following the main body, was therefore chosen as the title.

== Songs ==
Side one

"We're Gonna Groove" is a Ben E. King cover (original title is "Groovin'") that opens the album. The track was recorded live at a concert held at the Royal Albert Hall in January 1970; for the Coda album, Page removed audience sounds and live guitar, overdubbing a studio recorded guitar. The unedited version can be heard in the complete recording of the original Royal Albert Hall concert of 9 January 1970. The original album notes incorrectly state that the track was recorded at Morgan Studios in June 1969. This song was used to open a number of concerts on the band's early 1970 tours and was originally intended to be recorded for inclusion on Led Zeppelin II.

"Poor Tom" is an outtake from Led Zeppelin III, having been recorded at sessions held at Olympic Studios in June 1970.

"Walter's Walk", a reject from Houses of the Holy, was recorded at sessions during April and May 1972.

"I Can't Quit You Baby" is taken from the same January 1970 concert as "We're Gonna Groove" but was listed as a taped rehearsal in the original liner notes. The recording was edited to remove the crowd noise as well as the beginning and ending of the song. The crowd sounds were muted on the multi-track mixdown, as was done with "We're Gonna Groove".

Side two

Side two contains three outtakes from the band's previous album In Through the Out Door, plus a Bonham drum solo.

The uptempo "Ozone Baby" and the rock 'n' roll styled "Darlene" were recorded at that album's sessions at Polar Studios, Stockholm, in November 1978.

"Bonzo's Montreux" was recorded at Mountain Studios, Montreux, Switzerland, in September 1976. The track was conceived as a showcase for Bonham's drumming, to which Page added various electronic effects, including a harmonizer. The song was never performed live at Led Zeppelin concerts, however, Bonham performed parts of the composition during "Moby Dick" in 1977. In a contemporary review of Coda, Kurt Loder of Rolling Stone gave the track a positive review, praising Bonham's "drum orchestra" and the electronic effects added by Page. Loder further described the track as being "true to the spirit of Sandy Nelson, and thus vestigially nifty at the very least."

"Wearing and Tearing" was recorded at Polar in November 1978. It was written as a reaction to punk, and to show that Led Zeppelin could compete with new bands. The track was scheduled to be issued as a promotional single for the audience at the 1979 Knebworth Festival, headlined by Led Zeppelin, but the record was cancelled at the last minute. The song was first performed live at the 1990 Silver Clef Awards Festival at Knebworth by Plant's band with Page guesting.

Other tracks

The 1993 compact disc edition has four additional tracks from the box sets, Led Zeppelin Boxed Set (1990) and Led Zeppelin Boxed Set 2 (1993), the previously unreleased "Travelling Riverside Blues", "White Summer/Black Mountain Side" and the "Immigrant Song" b-side "Hey, Hey, What Can I Do" from the former box set and the previously unreleased "Baby Come On Home" from the latter box set.

In 2015, a remastered version of the entire album with two discs of additional material appeared.

== Cover ==
The album cover was designed by Hipgnosis, the fifth album cover the design group designed for Led Zeppelin. It was also the last album cover Hipgnosis designed before disbanding in 1983. The main four letters CODA are from an alphabet typeface design called "Neon Slim" designed by Bernard Allum in 1978.

== Critical reception ==
Professional ratings
Review scores
Source	Rating
AllMusic	3.5/5 stars
Classic Rock	7/10
Collector's Guide to Heavy Metal	8/10
The Daily Telegraph	3/5 stars
The Encyclopedia of Popular Music	2/5 stars
MusicHound Rock	3/5 stars
NME	2/10
Rolling Stone	4/5 stars
The Rolling Stone Album Guide	2/5 stars
The Village Voice	B+

Reviewing for Rolling Stone in 1983, Kurt Loder hailed Coda as "a resounding farewell" and a "marvel of compression, deftly tracing the Zeppelin decade with eight powerful, previously unreleased tracks, and no unnecessary elaboration". Robert Christgau wrote in his "Consumer Guide" column for The Village Voice:

They really were pretty great, and these eight outtakes—three from their elephantine blues phase, three from their unintentional swan song—aren't where to start discovering why. But despite the calculated clumsiness of the beginnings and the incomplete orchestrations of the end, everything here but the John Bonham Drum Orchestra would convince a disinterested party—a Martian, say. Jimmy Page provides a protean solo on "I Can't Quit You Baby" and jumbo riffs throughout.

According to Julian Marszalek of The Quietus, however, "Coda has always been regarded as the band's weakest release. Made up of eight tracks that spanned Led Zeppelin's lifetime, it refused to flow as an album. Devoid of a coherent narrative, it felt tossed together to make up for contractual obligations." In a retrospective review for AllMusic, Stephen Thomas Erlewine said while it did not include all of the band's notable non-album recordings, it offered "a good snapshot of much of what made Led Zeppelin a great band" and featured mostly "hard-charging rock & roll", including "Ozone Baby", "Darlene", and "Wearing and Tearing": "rockers that alternately cut loose, groove, and menace".

Led Zeppelin vocalist Robert Plant reflected on the album as follows: "When Coda was discussed, I really had—I don't know, I'd just kind of had enough of the whole thing. If you start playing for something other than just kudos and money, then that should be part of the motive all the way through. And when Bonzo died, it's the only reason to start staying actively involved with Led Zeppelin."

== 2015 reissue ==
2015 reissue ratings
Aggregate scores
Source	Rating
Metacritic	78/100
Review scores
Source	Rating
Mojo	4/5 stars
Pitchfork	7.3/10
Q	3/5 stars
Rolling Stone	4/5 stars
Uncut	8/10

A remastered version of Coda, along with Presence and In Through the Out Door, was reissued on 31 July 2015. The reissue comes in six formats: a standard CD edition, a deluxe three-CD edition, a standard LP version, a deluxe three-LP version, a super deluxe three-CD plus three-LP version with a hardback book, and as high resolution 24-bit/96k digital downloads. The deluxe and super deluxe editions feature bonus material containing alternative takes and previously unreleased songs, "If It Keeps On Raining", "Sugar Mama", "Four Hands", "St. Tristan's Sword", and "Desire". The reissue was released with an altered colour version of the original album's artwork as its bonus disc's cover.

The reissue was met with generally positive reviews. At Metacritic, which assigns a normalised rating out of 100 to reviews from mainstream publications, the album received an average score of 78, based on 8 reviews. In Rolling Stone, David Fricke said it is "the unlikely closing triumph in Page's series of deluxe Zeppelin reissues: a dynamic pocket history in rarities, across three discs with 15 bonus tracks, of his band's epic-blues achievement". Pitchfork journalist Mark Richardson was less impressed by the bonus disc, believing "there is nothing particularly noteworthy about the 'Bombay Orchestra' tracks".

== Track listing ==
=== Original release ===
All tracks written by Jimmy Page and Robert Plant, except where noted. All tracks produced by Jimmy Page, except for "Travelling Riverside Blues", produced by John Walters, and "White Summer"/"Black Mountain Side" produced by Jeff Griffin.

Side one
No.	Title	Writer(s)	Source	Length
1.	"We're Gonna Groove" (live)	James Bethea; Ben E. King	Recorded 9 January 1970 at the Royal Albert Hall, London, England. The included recording is an edit with guitar overdubs and live audience sound eliminated	2:37
2.	"Poor Tom" (outtake)		Led Zeppelin III sessions, 1970	3:02
3.	"I Can't Quit You Baby" (live)	Willie Dixon	Recorded 9 January 1970 at the Royal Albert Hall, London, England. The included recording is an edit with guitar overdubs and live audience sound eliminated	4:18
4.	"Walter's Walk" (outtake)		Houses of the Holy sessions, 1972, vocals and guitar solo overdubbed in 1981	4:31

Side two
No.	Title	Writer(s)	Source	Length
1.	"Ozone Baby" (outtake)		In Through the Out Door sessions, 1978	3:36
2.	"Darlene" (outtake)	Page; Plant; Jones; Bonham	In Through the Out Door sessions, 1978	5:06
3.	"Bonzo's Montreux"	Bonham	Recorded in 1976	4:22
4.	"Wearing and Tearing" (outtake)		In Through the Out Door sessions, 1978	5:27
Total length:				32:59

1993/2008 CD bonus tracks
No.	Title	Writer(s)	Source	Length
9.	"Baby Come On Home" (outtake)	Page; Plant; Bert Berns	Led Zeppelin sessions, 1968; also appeared on Boxed Set 2, 1993	4:30
10.	"Travelling Riverside Blues" (live)	Page; Plant; Robert Johnson	Recorded 23 June 1969 in London, England, also appeared on Led Zeppelin Boxed Set, 1990	5:08
11.	"White Summer"/"Black Mountain Side" (live)	Page	Recorded 27 June 1969 in London, England, also appeared on Led Zeppelin Boxed Set	8:01
12.	"Hey, Hey, What Can I Do"	Page; Plant; Jones; Bonham	B-side of the "Immigrant Song" single, 1970; also appeared on Led Zeppelin Boxed Set	3:52
Total length:				54:35

- The CD edition with bonus tracks was also included in the career-spanning boxed set Complete Studio Recordings (disc ten), and the subsequent Led Zeppelin Definitive Collection (disc twelve).

=== Deluxe edition bonus discs ===
Disc two
No.	Title	Writer(s)	Recording date	Length
1.	"We're Gonna Groove" (alternate mix, live at Royal Albert Hall)	Bethea; King	9 January 1970	2:40
2.	"If It Keeps On Raining" ("When the Levee Breaks", rough mix)	Page; Plant; Jones; Bonham; Memphis Minnie	11 November 1970	4:11
3.	"Bonzo's Montreux" (mix construction in progress)	Bonham	12 September 1976	4:57
4.	"Baby Come On Home"	Page; Plant; Berns	10 October 1968	4:30
5.	"Sugar Mama" (mix, Led Zeppelin outtake)		3 October 1968	2:50
6.	"Poor Tom" (instrumental mix)		5 June 1970	2:16
7.	"Travelling Riverside Blues" (BBC Sessions)	Page; Plant; Johnson	23 June 1969	5:08
8.	"Hey, Hey, What Can I Do"	Page; Plant; Jones; Bonham	29 May 1970	3:52

Disc three
No.	Title	Writer(s)	Recording date	Length
1.	"Four Hands" ("Four Sticks", Bombay Orchestra)		19 October 1972	4:43
2.	"Friends" (Bombay Orchestra)		19 October 1972	4:25
3.	"St. Tristan's Sword" (rough mix, Led Zeppelin III outtake)	Page	5 July 1970	5:40
4.	"Desire" ("The Wanton Song", rough mix)		15 February 1974	4:08
5.	"Bring It On Home" (rough mix)	Dixon	24 July 1969	2:32
6.	"Walter's Walk" (rough mix)		16 May 1972	3:18
7.	"Everybody Makes It Through" ("In the Light", rough mix)	Page; Plant; Jones	28 February 1974	8:31
Total length:				1:04:02

The CD edition mistakenly lists the running time of "Bring It On Home" (rough mix) as 4:19, which matches the duration of the finished version on Led Zeppelin II, not the intended time for the rough mix.

== Personnel ==
Led Zeppelin

- John Bonham – drums, percussion
- John Paul Jones – bass guitar, piano, keyboards
- Jimmy Page – acoustic and electric guitars, electronic treatments, production
- Robert Plant – vocals, harmonica

Production

- Assorted Images – design
- Barry Diament – mastering (original 1988 CD release)
- Stuart Epps – engineering
- Peter Grant – executive production
- Jeff Griffin – producer on "White Summer/Black Mountain Side"
- Hipgnosis – design
- Andy Johns – engineering
- Eddie Kramer – engineering
- Vic Maile – engineering
- George Marino – remastering (1994 edition)
- Leif Mases – engineering
- John Timperley – engineering
- John Walters – producer on "Travelling Riverside Blues"

== Charts ==
1982–1983 weekly chart performance for Coda
Chart (1982–1983)	Peak position
Australian Albums (Kent Music Report)	9
Canada Top Albums/CDs (RPM)	3
Finnish Albums (The Official Finnish Charts)	9
German Albums (Offizielle Top 100)	5
Japanese Albums (Oricon)	16
New Zealand Albums (RMNZ)	7
Norwegian Albums (VG-lista)	18
UK Albums (Official Charts)	4
US Billboard 200	6

2015 weekly chart performance for Coda
Chart (2015)	Peak position
Australian Albums (ARIA)	23
Austrian Albums (Ö3 Austria)	7
Belgian Albums (Ultratop Flanders)	19
Belgian Albums (Ultratop Wallonia)	7
Dutch Albums (Album Top 100)	9
Finnish Albums (Suomen virallinen lista)	9
French Albums (SNEP)	34
Hungarian Albums (MAHASZ)	5
Italian Albums (FIMI)	28
Portuguese Albums (AFP)	21
Scottish Albums (Official Charts)	8
Spanish Albums (Promusicae)	17
Swedish Albums (Sverigetopplistan)	7
Swiss Albums (Schweizer Hitparade)	12
UK Rock & Metal Albums (Official Charts)	2

== Certifications ==
Certifications for Coda
Region	Certification	Certified units/sales
United Kingdom (BPI)	Silver	60,000^{^}
United States (RIAA)	Platinum	1,000,000^{^}
^{^} Shipments figures based on certification alone.
