= Led Zeppelin Boxed Set =

Led Zeppelin

Box set by Led Zeppelin
- Released: 23 October 1990
- Recorded: October 1968 – December 1978
- Genres: Hard rock; heavy metal; blues rock; folk rock
- Length: 4:49:05
- Label: Atlantic
- Producer: Jimmy Page
- Compiler: Jimmy Page

Led Zeppelin chronology
Coda (1982)	Led Zeppelin (1990)	Led Zeppelin Remasters (1990)

Professional ratings
Review scores
Source	Rating
AllMusic	3.5/5 stars
The Encyclopedia of Popular Music	4/5 stars

Led Zeppelin is a boxed set by the English rock band Led Zeppelin. It was the first compilation of songs by the band (not counting Coda, which some sources list as a studio album) (Note: While some external sources categorise Coda as a compilation album, Led Zeppelin's official album label, Atlantic Records, categorises it as a studio album. See for example the liner notes for Led Zeppelin Boxed Set 2 and the label attached to The Complete Studio Recordings boxed set.) and the selection and remastering of the tracks were supervised by Jimmy Page. Atlantic Records released it on 23 October 1990 in the United States and on 29 October in the United Kingdom on several formats: four compact discs, six vinyl records, or four cassette tapes. A 36-page booklet was also included with the release.

Debuting at number 40 on the Billboard 200, the box set was described by Los Angeles Times journalist Dennis Hunt as "one of the most expensive albums ever to reach the Top 40", noting its retail price of $65 on CD and $55 on cassette.

== Background ==
This set contains two previously unreleased tracks and one new mix. "Travelling Riverside Blues" was recorded on 23 June 1969 at the BBC Maida Vale Studio. "White Summer/Black Mountain Side" was recorded at the Playhouse Theatre, London on 27 June 1969. The "Moby Dick/Bonzo's Montreux" mix took place at the Atlantic Synclavier Suite in New York, in May 1990. It also includes the band's only non-album B-side, "Hey, Hey, What Can I Do" of the 1970 single "Immigrant Song", previously unavailable on compact disc.

The set was released the same month as Remasters, a two-disc set containing selections from this one, plus a remastered version of "Good Times Bad Times." To differentiate between the two sets, in some markets the larger set is listed under the title The Complete Collection. To further the confusion, in both cases this is different from The Complete Studio Recordings box set released three years later, which includes all nine of the band's studio albums on ten discs, with the three extra tracks appended to Coda, along with the 1969 recording "Baby Come On Home", first released on the two-disc Led Zeppelin Boxed Set 2. The "Moby Dick/Bonzo's Montreux" mix is also included in the promotional interview album Profiled (1990). Also three years after this release, the remaining Led Zeppelin tracks not appearing on this box set were issued on Led Zeppelin Boxed Set 2.

== Track listing ==
All tracks produced by Jimmy Page except for "Travelling Riverside Blues" produced by John Walters and "White Summer/Black Mountain Side" produced by Jeff Griffin.

Disc one
No.	Title	Writer(s)	Origin	Length
1.	"Whole Lotta Love"	John Bonham; Willie Dixon; John Paul Jones; Jimmy Page; Robert Plant	Led Zeppelin II, 1969	5:34
2.	"Heartbreaker"	Bonham; Jones; Page; Plant	Led Zeppelin II	4:14
3.	"Communication Breakdown"	Bonham; Jones; Page	Led Zeppelin, 1969	2:29
4.	"Babe I'm Gonna Leave You"	Anne Bredon; Page; Plant	Led Zeppelin	6:42
5.	"What Is and What Should Never Be"	Page; Plant	Led Zeppelin II	4:47
6.	"Thank You"	Page; Plant	Led Zeppelin II	4:50
7.	"I Can't Quit You Baby" (Live at the Royal Albert Hall, London, England, 9 January 1970)	Dixon	Coda, 1982	4:15
8.	"Dazed and Confused"	Page (inspired by Jake Holmes)	Led Zeppelin	6:27
9.	"Your Time Is Gonna Come" (Early fade-out)	Jones; Page	Led Zeppelin	4:14
10.	"Ramble On"	Page; Plant	Led Zeppelin II	4:23
11.	"Travelling Riverside Blues" (Live at the BBC 23 June 1969)	Robert Johnson; Page; Plant	Previously unreleased, 1969	5:11
12.	"Friends"	Page; Plant	Led Zeppelin III, 1970	3:55
13.	"Celebration Day"	Jones; Page; Plant	Led Zeppelin III	3:29
14.	"Hey, Hey, What Can I Do"	Bonham; Jones; Page; Plant	"Immigrant Song" single, 1970	3:55
15.	"White Summer/Black Mountain Side" (Live at the BBC 27 June 1969)	Page	Previously unreleased, 1969	8:01

Disc two
No.	Title	Writer(s)	Origin	Length
1.	"Black Dog"	Jones; Page; Plant	Led Zeppelin IV, 1971	4:55
2.	"Over the Hills and Far Away"	Page; Plant	Houses of the Holy, 1973	4:50
3.	"Immigrant Song"	Page; Plant	Led Zeppelin III	2:27
4.	"The Battle of Evermore"	Page; Plant	Led Zeppelin IV	5:52
5.	"Bron-Y-Aur Stomp"	Jones; Page; Plant	Led Zeppelin III	4:20
6.	"Tangerine"	Page	Led Zeppelin III	2:57
7.	"Going to California"	Page; Plant	Led Zeppelin IV	3:31
8.	"Since I've Been Loving You"	Jones; Page; Plant	Led Zeppelin III	7:24
9.	"D'yer Mak'er"	Bonham; Jones; Page; Plant	Houses of the Holy	4:23
10.	"Gallows Pole"	traditional, arranged by: Page; Plant	Led Zeppelin III	4:58
11.	"Custard Pie"	Page; Plant	Physical Graffiti, 1975	4:13
12.	"Misty Mountain Hop"	Jones; Page; Plant	Led Zeppelin IV	4:38
13.	"Rock and Roll"	Bonham; Jones; Page; Plant	Led Zeppelin IV	3:41
14.	"The Rain Song"	Page; Plant	Houses of the Holy	7:39
15.	"Stairway to Heaven"	Page; Plant	Led Zeppelin IV	8:02

Disc three
No.	Title	Writer(s)	Origin	Length
1.	"Kashmir"	Bonham; Page; Plant	Physical Graffiti	8:33
2.	"Trampled Under Foot"	Jones; Page; Plant	Physical Graffiti	5:37
3.	"For Your Life"	Page; Plant	Presence, 1976	6:24
4.	"No Quarter"	Jones; Page; Plant	Houses of the Holy	7:00
5.	"Dancing Days"	Page; Plant	Houses of the Holy	3:43
6.	"When the Levee Breaks"	Bonham; Memphis Minnie; Jones; Page; Plant	Led Zeppelin IV	7:07
7.	"Achilles Last Stand"	Page; Plant	Presence	10:25
8.	"The Song Remains the Same"	Page; Plant	Houses of the Holy	5:32
9.	"Ten Years Gone"	Page; Plant	Physical Graffiti	6:32
10.	"In My Time of Dying"	Bonham; Jones; Page; Plant	Physical Graffiti	11:05

Disc four
No.	Title	Writer(s)	Origin	Length
1.	"In the Evening"	Jones; Page; Plant	In Through the Out Door, 1979	6:49
2.	"Candy Store Rock"	Page; Plant	Presence	4:11
3.	"The Ocean"	Bonham; Jones; Page; Plant	Houses of the Holy	4:31
4.	"Ozone Baby"	Page; Plant	Coda	3:35
5.	"Houses of the Holy"	Page; Plant	Physical Graffiti	4:02
6.	"Wearing and Tearing"	Page; Plant	Coda	5:31
7.	"Poor Tom"	Page; Plant	Coda	3:03
8.	"Nobody's Fault but Mine"	Page; Plant	Presence	6:27
9.	"Fool in the Rain"	Jones; Page; Plant	In Through the Out Door	6:12
10.	"In the Light"	Jones; Page; Plant	Physical Graffiti	8:46
11.	"The Wanton Song"	Page; Plant	Physical Graffiti	4:07
12.	"Moby Dick/Bonzo's Montreux"	Bonham; Jones; Page	Previously unreleased remix of both recordings, 1990	3:50
13.	"I'm Gonna Crawl"	Jones; Page; Plant	In Through the Out Door	5:30
14.	"All My Love"	Jones; Plant	In Through the Out Door	5:51

== Personnel ==
- John Bonham – drums, percussion, backing vocals
- John Paul Jones – bass guitar, keyboards, mandolin, backing vocals
- Jimmy Page – guitars, backing vocals, production, digital remastering
- Robert Plant – vocals, harmonica
- Sandy Denny – vocals on "The Battle of Evermore"
- Ian Stewart – piano on "Rock and Roll"
- Yves Beauvais – producer
- Bruce Buchanan – engineering
- Peter Grant – executive producer
- Jeff Griffin – producer
- Chris Houston – engineering
- John Mahoney – Programming and engineering on "Moby Dick"/"Bonzo's Montreux"
- George Marino – remastering and digital remastering
- Tony Wilson – engineering on "Travelling Riverside Blues" and "White Summer"
- Bob Alford – photography
- Richard Creamer – photography
- Cameron Crowe – liner notes
- Jim Cummins – photography
- Chris Dreja – photography
- Robert Ellis – photography
- Larry Fremantle – design
- Neil Jones – photography
- John Kubick – digital transfers
- Kurt Loder – liner notes
- Janet Macoska – photography
- Richard "Hutch" Hutchison – design co-ordinator
- Jennifer Moore – photography and imaging
- Terry O'Neil – photography
- Robert Palmer – liner notes
- Barry Plummer – photography
- Neal Preston – photography
- Michael Putland – photography
- Rhonda Schoen – digital editing and transfers
- Peter Simon – photography
- Pennie Smith – photography
- Jay Thompson – photography
- Chris Walter – photography
- Bob Gruen – photography
- Chris Wroe – photography and imaging
- Neil Zlozower – photography

== Charts ==
1990 weekly chart performance for Led Zeppelin Boxed Set
Chart (1990)	Peak position
Australian Albums (ARIA)	46
Canada Top Albums/CDs (RPM)	16
Japanese Albums (Oricon)	17
UK Albums (Official Charts)	48
US Billboard 200	18

2011 weekly chart performance for Led Zeppelin Boxed Set
Chart (2011)	Peak position
Italian Albums (FIMI)	36

== Certifications ==
Certifications for Led Zeppelin Boxed Set
Region	Certification	Certified units/sales
Canada (Music Canada)	Gold	50,000^{^}
United Kingdom (BPI) 2001 release	Silver	60,000^{^}
United States (RIAA)	Diamond	2,500,000^{^}
^{^} Shipments figures based on certification alone.

== Release history ==
Release formats for Led Zeppelin Boxed Set
Region	Date	Label	Format	Catalog #
United States	October 1990	Atlantic Records	6LP (33 rpm)	82144-1
United States	October 1990	Atlantic Records	4 Compact disc	82144-2
United States	October 1990	Atlantic Records	4 Cassette	82144-4
United Kingdom	October 1990	Atlantic Records	4 Compact disc	7567-82144-2
France	October 1990	Atlantic Records	4 Compact disc	7567-82144-2
Germany	October 1990	Atlantic Records	4 Compact disc	7567-82144-2
Japan	October 1990	Atlantic Records	4 Compact disc	AMCY-170/3
Germany	1990	East West Records	4 Compact disc	7567-80566-2

== See also ==
- List of best-selling albums in the United States
