= Baby Come On Home =

Single by Led Zeppelin

from the album Boxed Set 2
- Released: 21 September 1993
- Recorded: 10 October 1968
- Studio: Olympic Sound Studios, London
- Genre: Blue-eyed soul
- Length: 4:29
- Label: Atlantic
- Songwriters: Bert Berns, Jimmy Page, Robert Plant
- Producer: Jimmy Page

Led Zeppelin singles chronology
"Travelling Riverside Blues" (1990)	"Baby Come On Home" (1993)	"The Girl I Love She Got Long Black Wavy Hair" (1997)

"Baby Come On Home" is a soul song by English rock band Led Zeppelin. It was recorded during sessions for the band's debut album but remained unreleased until 1993, when it was included on the compilation Boxed Set 2. The song was also included as a bonus track on some CD editions of the band's ninth studio album Coda as included in The Complete Studio Recordings (1993) and Definitive Collection Mini LP Replica CD Boxset (2008). In 2015, the song was included on disc one of the two companion discs of the reissue of Coda.

== Background ==
The master tape from the recording session went missing for a number of years and allegedly turned up in a refuse bin outside Olympic Studios, following renovations in 1991. It was mixed by Mike Fraser for a much-belated release in 1993, with a single to promote the Boxed Set 2.

The song was originally recorded under the title "Tribute to Bert Berns", in honour of the American songwriter, producer, and friend of Zeppelin guitarist Jimmy Page, who had died in December 1967. The composition is credited to Page, Plant, and Berns, who had written a song of the same title, variations of which were recorded by Hoagy Lands and Solomon Burke in 1964 and 1965.

On this track, Jimmy Page played guitar through a Leslie speaker and John Paul Jones played piano and a Hammond organ.

== Chart positions ==
=== Single ===
Chart (1993)	Peak position
US Billboard Mainstream Rock Tracks Chart	4
Canadian RPM Top 100 Chart	66

== Personnel ==
According to Jean-Michel Guesdon and Philippe Margotin:

- Robert Plant – vocals
- Jimmy Page – guitars
- John Paul Jones – bass, piano, Hammond organ
- John Bonham – drums

== Bibliography ==
- Guesdon, Jean-Michel; Margotin, Philippe (2018). Led Zeppelin All the Songs: The Story Behind Every Track. Running Press. ISBN 978-0-316-448-67-3.
- Lewis, Dave (1994). The Complete Guide to the Music of Led Zeppelin. Omnibus Press. ISBN 0-7119-3528-9.
- Welch, Chris. Led Zeppelin: Dazed and Confused: The Stories Behind Every Song. Da Capo Press. ISBN 1-56025-818-7.
