= George Hardie (artist) =

English artist (born 1944)

George Hardie (born 1944) is an English graphic designer, illustrator and educator, best known for his work producing cover art for the albums of rock musicians and bands with the British art design group Hipgnosis.

After attending St. Martin’s and the Royal College of Art in London, Hardie partnered in Nicholas Thirkell Associates (NTA Studios) collaborating with Bob Lawrie, Bush Hollyhead and Malcolm Harrison, as well as Storm Thorgerson and Aubrey Powell of Hipgnosis. His work includes the cover artwork for Led Zeppelin's debut album, Led Zeppelin (1969); Pink Floyd's The Dark Side of the Moon (1973) and Wish You Were Here (1975); 10cc's Sheet Music (1974); and Genesis' The Lamb Lies Down On Broadway (1974). He also provided artwork for Pink Floyd's 1977 In the Flesh tour book which was made available in the Animals 2018-mix box set (2022). As a designer/illustrator, Hardie has worked internationally.

Since 1990, Hardie has taught postgraduate students of graphic design at the University of Brighton's Faculty of Arts. In 1994, Hardie became a member of the Alliance Graphique Internationale, for which he now serves as International Secretary. In 2012 Hardie was elected as Master of the Art Workers' Guild. He retired in 2014. George Hardie's book 'Manual', started in 2004 was published in August 2021.
