= Led Zeppelin Boxed Set 2 =

Box set by Led Zeppelin
- Released: 20 September 1993
- Recorded: October 1968 – December 1978
- Genres: Hard rock; heavy metal; blues rock; folk rock
- Length: 144:00
- Label: Atlantic
- Producer: Jimmy Page
- Compiler: Jimmy Page

Led Zeppelin chronology
Led Zeppelin Remasters (1990)	Led Zeppelin Boxed Set 2 (1993)	The Complete Studio Recordings (1993)

Singles from Boxed Set 2
- 1. "Baby Come On Home" Released: 21 September 1993

Professional ratings
Review scores
Source	Rating
AllMusic	3.5/5 stars
The Encyclopedia of Popular Music	3/5 stars

Led Zeppelin Boxed Set 2 is a double album released by Atlantic Records on 20 September 1993. This box set features the rest of the English rock band Led Zeppelin's catalogue not included in the 1990 4-CD box set Led Zeppelin, all digitally remastered, including the previously unreleased studio track "Baby Come On Home". A 54-page booklet was also included with the release. Between this box set and the 4-CD box set every track from the band's nine studio albums are featured along with two BBC live recordings; the band's only non-LP b-side; and one studio outtake.

== Track listing ==
Disc one
No.	Title	Writer(s)	Origin	Length
1.	"Good Times Bad Times"	John Bonham, John Paul Jones, and Jimmy Page	Led Zeppelin, 1969	2:47
2.	"We're Gonna Groove"	James Bethea and Ben E. King	Coda, 1982	2:40
3.	"Night Flight"	Jones, Page, and Robert Plant	Physical Graffiti, 1975	3:36
4.	"That's the Way"	Page and Plant	Led Zeppelin III, 1970	5:39
5.	"Baby Come On Home"	Bert Berns, Page, and Plant	Previously unreleased, 1968	4:30
6.	"The Lemon Song"	Bonham, Chester Burnett, Jones, Page, and Plant	Led Zeppelin II, 1969	6:22
7.	"You Shook Me"	Willie Dixon and J. B. Lenoir	Led Zeppelin	6:30
8.	"Boogie with Stu"	Bonham, Jones, Page, Plant, Ian Stewart, and Mrs. Valens	Physical Graffiti	3:53
9.	"Bron-Yr-Aur"	Page	Physical Graffiti	2:06
10.	"Down by the Seaside"	Page and Plant	Physical Graffiti	5:13
11.	"Out on the Tiles"	Bonham, Page, and Plant	Led Zeppelin III	4:08
12.	"Black Mountain Side"	Page	Led Zeppelin	2:05
13.	"Moby Dick"	Bonham, Jones, and Page	Led Zeppelin II	4:22
14.	"Sick Again"	Page and Plant	Physical Graffiti	4:42
15.	"Hot Dog"	Page and Plant	In Through the Out Door, 1979	3:17
16.	"Carouselambra"	Jones, Page, and Plant	In Through the Out Door	10:32

Disc two
No.	Title	Writer(s)	Origin	Length
1.	"South Bound Saurez"	Jones and Plant	In Through the Out Door	4:12
2.	"Walter's Walk"	Page and Plant	Coda	4:31
3.	"Darlene"	Bonham, Jones, Page, and Plant	Coda	5:06
4.	"Black Country Woman"	Page and Plant	Physical Graffiti	4:24
5.	"How Many More Times"	Bonham, Jones, and Page	Led Zeppelin	8:28
6.	"The Rover"	Page and Plant	Physical Graffiti	5:37
7.	"Four Sticks"	Page and Plant	Led Zeppelin IV, 1971	4:46
8.	"Hats Off to (Roy) Harper"	traditional, arranged by Charles Obscure	Led Zeppelin III	3:42
9.	"I Can't Quit You Baby"	Dixon	Led Zeppelin	4:43
10.	"Hots On for Nowhere"	Page and Plant	Presence, 1976	4:43
11.	"Living Loving Maid (She's Just a Woman)"	Page and Plant	Led Zeppelin II	2:40
12.	"Royal Orleans"	Bonham, Jones, Page, and Plant	Presence	2:58
13.	"Bonzo's Montreux"	Bonham	Coda	4:17
14.	"The Crunge"	Bonham, Jones, Page, and Plant	Houses of the Holy, 1973	3:17
15.	"Bring It On Home"	Dixon	Led Zeppelin II	4:20
16.	"Tea for One"	Page and Plant	Presence	9:27

- "Black Mountain Side" is slightly edited removing the crossfade from "Your Time Is Gonna Come".

== Personnel ==
Led Zeppelin

- John Bonham – drums, percussion
- John Paul Jones – bass guitar, keyboards, mandolin
- Jimmy Page – acoustic and electric guitars, production, remastering, digital remastering
- Robert Plant – vocals, harmonica

Additional musicians

- Viram Jasani – tabla on "Black Mountain Side"
- Ian Stewart – piano on "Boogie with Stu"

Production

- Bob Alford – photography
- Rick Barrett - rare collectibles
- Yves Beauvais – production
- Bruce Buchanan – engineering
- Richard Creamer – photography
- Jim Cummins – photography
- Chris Dreja – photography
- Robert Ellis – photography
- Larry Fremantle – design
- Peter Grant – executive producer
- Jeff Griffin – production
- Bob Gruen – photography
- Chris Houston – engineering
- Richard "Hutch" Hutchison – design co-ordinator
- Neil Jones – photography
- John Kubick – digital transfers
- Kurt Loder – liner notes
- Janet Macoska – photography
- John Mahoney – programming
- George Marino – remastering and digital remastering
- Jennifer Moore – photography and imaging
- Terry O'Neil – photography
- Barry Plummer – photography
- Neal Preston – photography
- Michael Putland – photography
- Rhonda Schoen – digital editing and transfers
- Peter Simon – photography
- Pennie Smith – photography
- Jay Thompson – photography
- Chris Walter – photography
- Tony Wilson – engineering
- Chris Wroe – photography and imaging
- Neil Zlozower – photography

== Charts ==
1993 weekly chart performance for Led Zeppelin Boxed Set 2
Chart (1993)	Peak position
Canada Top Albums/CDs (RPM)	67
Japanese Albums (Oricon)	45
New Zealand Albums (RMNZ)	48
UK Albums (Official Charts)	56
US Billboard 200	87

== Certifications ==
Certifications for Led Boxed Set 2
Region	Certification	Certified units/sales
United States (RIAA)	Gold	250,000^{^}
^{^} Shipments figures based on certification alone.

== Release history ==
Release formats for Led Boxed Set 2
Region	Date	Label	Format	Catalog #
United Kingdom	20 September 1993	Atlantic Records	Compact disc (box set)	7567-82477-2
