= When the Levee Breaks =

1929 single by Kansas Joe and Memphis Minnie

Single by Kansas Joe & Memphis Minnie
- Released: August–September 1929
- Recorded: New York City, June 18, 1929
- Genre: Country blues
- Length: 3:11
- Label: Columbia
- Songwriters: Kansas Joe McCoy; Memphis Minnie

"When the Levee Breaks" is a country blues song written and first recorded by Kansas Joe McCoy and Memphis Minnie in 1929. The lyrics reflect experiences during the upheaval caused by the Great Mississippi Flood of 1927. In 2026 it was inducted into the Blues Hall of Fame in the 'Singles/album tracks' category.

"When the Levee Breaks" was re-worked by English rock group Led Zeppelin and became the final song on their untitled fourth album. Singer Robert Plant used many of the original lyrics. The songwriting is credited to Memphis Minnie and the individual members of Led Zeppelin. Many other artists have performed and recorded versions of the song.

== Background and lyrics ==
When blues musical duo Kansas Joe McCoy and Memphis Minnie wrote "When the Levee Breaks", the Great Mississippi Flood of 1927 was still fresh in people's memories. The flooding affected 26,000 square miles of the Mississippi Delta. Hundreds were killed and hundreds of thousands of residents were forced to evacuate. The event is the subject of several blues songs, such as "Mississippi Heavy Water Blues" by Barbecue Bob (1928).

Ethel Douglas, Minnie's sister-in-law, recalled that Minnie was living with her family near Walls, Mississippi, when the levee broke in 1927. The song's lyrics recount the story of a man who lost his home and his family. Despite the tragedy, biographers also see in it a statement of rebirth.

== Recording and release ==
McCoy and Minnie recorded "When the Levee Breaks" during their first session for Columbia Records in New York City on June 18, 1929. The song features McCoy on vocals and rhythm guitar. Minnie, the more accomplished guitarist of the two, provided the embellishments using a finger-picked style in a Spanish or open G tuning. Music journalist Charles Shaar Murray identified Joe McCoy as the actual songwriter but, as with all their Columbia releases, regardless of who sang the song the record labels list the artist as "Kansas Joe and Memphis Minnie".

Columbia issued the song on the then-standard 78 rpm phonograph record in August or June 1929 with "That Will Be Alright", another vocal performance by McCoy, on the flip-side. The record was released before record industry publications, such as Billboard began tracking so-called race records, but it has been called a moderate hit. "When the Levee Breaks" has been included on several Memphis Minnie compilation albums, and blues roots albums featuring various artists.

== Led Zeppelin version ==
"When the Levee Breaks"

Song by Led Zeppelin

from the album Led Zeppelin IV
- Released: November 8, 1971
- Recorded: 1971
- Studio: Headley Grange, Headley, Hampshire, England
- Genre: Blues rock; hard rock; urban blues
- Length: 7:08
- Label: Atlantic
- Songwriters: John Bonham; John Paul Jones; Memphis Minnie; Jimmy Page; Robert Plant
- Producer: Jimmy Page

Led Zeppelin recorded "When the Levee Breaks" for inclusion on their 1971 untitled fourth album. When considering material for the group to record, singer Robert Plant had suggested the Kansas Joe McCoy and Memphis Minnie song. Jimmy Page said that while Plant's lyrics followed the style of the original, he had developed a new guitar riff that set their version apart. John Bonham's drumming is usually noted as the defining feature of the song.

=== Recording ===
Before the released version appeared, Led Zeppelin attempted the song twice. They recorded an early version of the song in December 1970 at Headley Grange, using the Rolling Stones Mobile Studio. This was later released as "If It Keeps On Raining" on the 2015 reissue of Coda. Before relocating to Headley Grange, they tried unsuccessfully to record the song at Island Studios at the beginning of the recording sessions for their fourth album.

Although Page and John Paul Jones based their guitar and bass lines on the original song, they did not follow its twelve-bar blues I–IV–V–I structure, but instead used a one-chord or modal approach to create a droning sound. Plant used many of the original lyrics, but with a different melodic approach. He also added a harmonica part. During mixing, a reverse echo effect was created, in which the echo was heard ahead of the source.

John Bonham's drumming, on a Ludwig kit, was recorded in the lobby of Headley Grange using two Beyerdynamic M 160 microphones which were suspended above a flight of stairs. Output from these was passed to a pair of Helios F760 compressor/limiters which were set aggressively to create a breathing effect. A Binson Echorec, a delay effects unit, was also used.

Parts of the song were recorded at a different tempo and then slowed down, causing a "sludgy" sound, particularly on the harmonica and guitar solos. It was the only song on the album that was mixed at Sunset Sound in Hollywood, California; the rest were remixed in London. Page said the panning at the song's ending was one of his favourite mixes, "when everything starts moving around except for the voice, which remains stationary". The song was difficult to recreate live and the band played it only a few times, in the early stages of their 1975 U.S. Tour.

=== Critical reception ===
Music critic Robert Christgau said Led Zeppelin's version of "When the Levee Breaks" was the greatest achievement of their fourth album. He argued that, because it played like an authentic blues song and had "the grandeur of a symphonic crescendo", their version of the song transcended and dignified "the quasi-parodic overstatement and oddly cerebral mood" of their past blues songs. Mick Wall called it a "hypnotic, blues rock mantra". AllMusic critic Stephen Thomas Erlewine, in a retrospective review, commented that the song was the only piece on their fourth album equal to "Stairway to Heaven" and called it "an apocalyptic slice of urban blues ... as forceful and frightening as Zeppelin ever got, and its seismic rhythms and layered dynamics illustrate why none of their imitators could ever equal them." In The Rolling Stone Album Guide (2004), Greg Kot wrote that the song showed the band's "hard-rock blues" at their most "momentous". However, group biographer Keith Shadwick noted that the song suffered from "too few ideas added to the ingredients as the minutes tick by, compared with 'Black Dog'" and other songs on the first side of the album.

=== Other releases ===
A second version of the song was released in 2014 on the second disc of the remastered two-disc deluxe edition of Led Zeppelin IV. This version, known as "When The Levee Breaks (Alternate UK Mix in Progress)", was recorded on May 19, 1971, at the Rolling Stones Mobile Studio at Headley Grange. This mix runs 7:09, while the original runs 7:08.

=== Other versions and sampling ===
Robert Plant performed the song with Alison Krauss on their 2022 tour. One concert reviewer described Plant's vocal as "astonishing, channeling every flood he had seen in his 74 years into the emotional resonance of his voice".

Bonham's drum beat is one of the most widely sampled in popular music, notably in Beyoncé's "Don't Hurt Yourself". According to Esquire magazine's Miles Raymer:

The two-bar break that opens "When the Levee Breaks" is one of the most monumental pieces of rock drumming ever recorded, and one of the most widely sampled pieces of music ever, having appeared in songs by everyone from Eminem and Dr. Dre to Mike Oldfield and Sophie B. Hawkins.

== Honor ==
The original version as recorded by Kansas Joe McCoy and Memphis Minnie in 1929 was inducted into the Blues Hall of Fame in 2026, in the 'Singles/album tracks' category.

== See also ==
- List of Led Zeppelin songs written or inspired by others
