= Food Weekly News =

- Type: Weekly newspaper
- Owner: NewsRx, LLC
- Headquarters: Atlanta, Georgia
- ISSN: 1944-1762
- Website: FoodWeeklyNews

Food Weekly News is a weekly food science and agricultural newspaper reporting on the latest developments in research in food production. It is published by Vertical News, an imprint of NewsRx, LLC.
