= Tour Over Europe 1980 =

1980 concert tour by Led Zeppelin

- Tour by Led Zeppelin
- Location: Europe
- Associated album: In Through the Out Door
- Start date: 17 June 1980
- End date: 7 July 1980
- Legs: 1
- No. of shows: 14 (16 scheduled)

Led Zeppelin concert chronology
- Knebworth 1979; Tour Over Europe 1980; Ahmet Ertegun Tribute Concert 2007

Tour Over Europe 1980 was the last concert tour by the English rock band Led Zeppelin. The tour ran from 17 June to 7 July 1980. Nine of the tour's shows were performed in cities throughout West Germany, as well as one show each in Brussels, Rotterdam, Vienna, Zürich, and West Berlin.

== History ==
This was the first series of concerts performed by the band since their shows at Knebworth almost a year before. Singer Robert Plant was reluctant to tour the United States, and the band wanted to avoid some of the negative press attention that had dogged them in the United Kingdom, so as a compromise Led Zeppelin manager Peter Grant decided to schedule a short European tour. He hoped that being on the road again would rejuvenate Plant's enthusiasm for touring and eventually inspire Plant's desire to tour the U.S. again.

The band performed rehearsals for the tour at the Rainbow Theatre and Victoria Theatre in London, and then at Shepperton Studios, Middlesex.

During the tour the band played small venues with a scaled-down PA and a modest stage and lighting setup. As such, it had a much more low-key feel than on recent tours. The set list was also shorter, at approximately two hours, with some of the band's longer songs such as "No Quarter" and "Moby Dick" discarded. Material from the band's most recent album, In Through the Out Door, was also limited. The concerts opened with "Train Kept A-Rollin'," which had not been a regular feature of their live sets since 1969. Press coverage of the tour was minimal.

Generally speaking, there was a playful and generous spirit about the tour, with guitarist Jimmy Page even handling some of the stage introductions himself for the first time in the band's twelve-year career. However, some on-stage problems were experienced. The 26 June show at Vienna was interrupted during "White Summer" when Page was struck in the face by a firecracker. The organizer stepped up and talked to the audience, and asked the person responsible to come to the stage to have a word with him. After a delay, omitting "Black Mountain Side", Page and the band returned to play "Kashmir" and the rest of the show. The 27 June show at Nuremberg came to an abrupt end after the third song when John Bonham collapsed on stage and was rushed to a hospital. Press speculation arose that Bonham's problem was caused by an excess of alcohol and drugs, but the band claimed that he had simply overeaten.

The tour's poster listed a second concert at Berlin, on 8 July, but this show was never performed. The final full-length concert Led Zeppelin played until 2007 was on 7 July, with "Whole Lotta Love" being the closing number at this gig.

In an interview, bass player John Paul Jones recalled of this tour:

Morale was very high. We were in really good spirits. We were stripped down a lot, musically, and as an act, we remember back to what we were doing. Punk kind of woke us up again. "Oh yeah, I remember what we are supposed to be doing here." It was about to go for a change of gears and round two ... By the time John [Bonham] died, we all had sorted it out and were ready to go again. He died in rehearsals for an American tour.

== Recordings ==
=== Audio bootlegs ===
All the shows of the tour were released by the bootleg label Tarantura on a 26-disc box set, and as separate releases during 1996 and 1997. Most of the shows are complete and are sourced from soundboard recordings; the Rotterdam show is missing the first four songs (there are, however, two complete audience recordings of the Rotterdam show in existence), and the Vienna and Munich shows are sourced from audience recordings. There have been many unofficial releases of these concerts since, most of them in higher audio quality than Tarantura’s release.

=== Video ===
On Led Zeppelin's website, there are 8mm films featuring parts of the Rotterdam, Zürich and Munich shows. Footage also exists for the shows in Dortmund and Cologne.

== Tour set list ==
1. "Train Kept A-Rollin'" (Bradshaw, Kay, Mann)
2. "Nobody's Fault but Mine" (Page, Plant)
3. "Out on the Tiles" (intro) (Bonham, Page, Plant, ) / "Black Dog" (Jones, Page, Plant)
4. "In the Evening" (Jones, Page, Plant)
5. "The Rain Song" (Page, Plant)
6. "Hot Dog" (Page, Plant)
7. "All My Love" (Jones, Plant)
8. "Trampled Under Foot" (Jones, Page, Plant)
9. "Since I've Been Loving You" (Jones, Page, Plant)
10. "Achilles Last Stand" (Page, Plant) (not performed on 26 June or 7 July)
11. "White Summer"/"Black Mountain Side" (Page)
12. "Kashmir" (Bonham, Page, Plant)
13. "Stairway to Heaven" (Page, Plant)

Encores:

- "Rock and Roll" (Bonham, Jones, Page, Plant)
- "Whole Lotta Love" (Bonham, Dixon, Jones, Page, Plant)
  - Performed on 17, 20, 26 & 30 June; on 2 & 5 July (with Simon Kirke on second drum set) and on 7 July
- "Heartbreaker" (Bonham, Jones, Page, Plant)
  - Performed on 17, 21 & 29 June
- "Communication Breakdown" (Bonham, Jones, Page)
  - Performed on 18, 23 & 24 June and on 3 July
- "Money (That's What I Want)" (Gordy, Bradford)
  - Performed on 30 June (with Philip Carson on bass guitar)

== Tour dates ==
The tour was pushed back a month. The original itinerary consisted of:

Date	City	Country	Venue
22 May 1980	Vienna	Austria	Wiener Stadthalle
23 May 1980	Munich	West Germany	Olympiahalle
25 May 1980	Dortmund	West Germany	Westfalenhalle
26 May 1980	Cologne	West Germany	Sporthalle
28 May 1980	Bremen	West Germany	Bremen Stadthalle
29 May 1980	Berlin	West Germany	Eissporthalle
30 May 1980	Berlin	West Germany	Eissporthalle
31 May 1980	Mannheim	West Germany	Eisstadion
1 June 1980	Mannheim	West Germany	Eisstadion
2 June 1980	Zürich	Switzerland	Hallenstadion
5 June 1980	Brussels	Belgium	Forest National
14 June 1980	Saint-Ouen	France	Sport Center

The dates performed were:

Date	City	Country	Venue
17 June 1980	Dortmund	West Germany	Westfalenhalle
18 June 1980	Cologne	West Germany	Sporthalle
20 June 1980	Brussels	Belgium	Vorst Nationaal
21 June 1980	Rotterdam	Netherlands	Rotterdam Ahoy
23 June 1980	Bremen	West Germany	Stadthalle
24 June 1980	Hanover	West Germany	Messehalle
26 June 1980	Vienna	Austria	Wiener Stadthalle
27 June 1980	Nuremberg	West Germany	Messezentrum Halle
29 June 1980	Zürich	Switzerland	Hallenstadion
30 June 1980	Frankfurt	West Germany	Festhalle Frankfurt
2 July 1980	Mannheim	West Germany	Eisstadion am Friedrichspark
3 July 1980	Mannheim	West Germany	Eisstadion am Friedrichspark
5 July 1980	Munich	West Germany	Olympiahalle
7 July 1980	West Berlin	West Germany	Eissporthalle an der Jafféstraße

== See also ==
- Led Zeppelin – The 1980s, Part One, a proposed follow-up tour of the United States that was cancelled after the death of John Bonham.

== Sources ==
- Lewis, Dave and Pallett, Simon (1997) Led Zeppelin: The Concert File, London: Omnibus Press. ISBN 0-7119-5307-4.
