= AIJ =

AIJ, Aij, or aij may refer to:

- Artificial Intelligence (journal), a scholarly journal about artificial intelligence
- $A_{ij}$, the notation for the entry in the i-th row and j-th column of a matrix (mathematics)
- Inter-Zab Jewish Neo-Aramaic, a Judeo-Aramaic dialect spoken in Israel and Iraq, by ISO 639 code
- Architectural Institute of Japan, a Japanese institute for people in architecture
- Interjet, a defunct low-cost airline based in Mexico from 2005 to 2020, by ICAO code
- Assemblée InterJurassienne, an organization that proposed a way of making new Swiss cantons in 2007; see Jura separatism
- Air Jet, a defunct airline based in France from 1974 to 2003, by ICAO code; see List of defunct airlines of France
- Artificial Intelligence Journalist, a type of AI-based journalism software created by the NewsRx company in 1999

== See also ==
- AIJ Investment Advisors, a company that lost ¥130,000,000,000 in 2012 due to trading in volatility options; see List of trading losses
- Age (disambiguation), several things
