= Thriller (album) =

1982 studio album by Michael Jackson

Studio album by Michael Jackson
- Released: November 29, 1982
- Recorded: April 14 – November 8, 1982
- Studios: Westlake, Los Angeles, California
- Genres: Post-disco; synth-pop
- Length: 42:16
- Label: Epic
- Producers: Quincy Jones; Michael Jackson (co.)

Michael Jackson chronology
E.T. the Extra-Terrestrial (1982)	Thriller (1982)	18 Greatest Hits (1983)

Singles from Thriller
- 1. "The Girl Is Mine" Released: October 18, 1982; 2. "Billie Jean" Released: January 3, 1983; 3. "Beat It" Released: February 21, 1983; 4. "Wanna Be Startin' Somethin'" Released: May 9, 1983; 5. "Human Nature" Released: July 4, 1983; 6. "P.Y.T. (Pretty Young Thing)" Released: September 19, 1983; 7. "Thriller" Released: November 11, 1983

Thriller is the sixth studio album by the American singer Michael Jackson. It was released on November 29, 1982, through Epic Records. It was produced by Quincy Jones, who produced Jackson's previous album, Off the Wall (1979). Recording took place from April to November 1982 at Westlake Recording Studios in Los Angeles, California, with a budget of $750,000 (equivalent to $2,502,155 in 2025). With an ongoing backlash against disco, Jackson transitioned his sound, with Thriller primarily featuring post-disco and synth-pop among various influences ranging from funk to rock, while its themes include paranoia, romance, and social consciousness. Paul McCartney appears as the first credited featured artist on a Jackson album.

Thriller was Jackson's first number-one album on the Billboard Top LPs & Tape chart and was at number one for a record 37 non-consecutive weeks. The singles "Billie Jean" and "Beat It" topped the Billboard Hot 100 chart, while "The Girl Is Mine", "Wanna Be Startin' Somethin'", "Human Nature", "P.Y.T. (Pretty Young Thing)", and "Thriller" were Top 10 hits, setting a record for the most Top 10 hits from one album. Sales of Thriller surged after Jackson debuted his signature moonwalk dance in Motown 25 and the "Thriller" music video premiered on MTV, and by early 1984 it had become the best-selling album of all time, with sales of over 30 million copies.

Thriller was praised by critics and soon attracted greater acclaim. It won a record-breaking eight Grammy Awards, including Album of the Year and Record of the Year for "Beat It", and earned Jackson a record-breaking eight American Music Awards. It was the best-selling album of 1983 worldwide, and in 1984 it became the first album to be the best-selling in the United States for two years. It had an enormous impact on the music industry; in particular, the several music videos from the album are credited with transforming music videos into a serious art form.

Thriller remains the best-selling album of all time, having sold an estimated 70 million copies worldwide, and is certified 34× platinum in the US, making it the second best-selling album in the US. It is often recognized as a landmark in American culture; the success gave Jackson an unprecedented level of cultural significance for a black American, breaking racial barriers in popular music and causing an intense fan frenzy dubbed "Michaelmania". It is frequently recognized as one of the greatest and most influential albums. In 2008, it was inducted into the Grammy Hall of Fame and added to the National Recording Registry of "culturally, historically, or aesthetically significant recordings" by the Library of Congress.

== Background ==
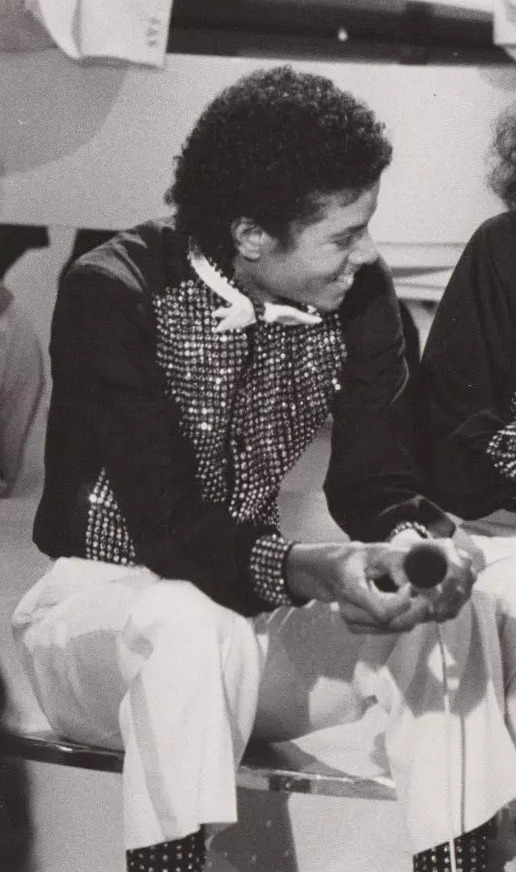
Jackson during a television appearance in 1981

Jackson's previous album Off the Wall (1979) received critical acclaim and was a commercial success, having sold 7 million copies at the time. The years between Off the Wall and Thriller were a transitional period for Jackson, a time of increased independence. The period saw him become deeply unhappy; Jackson said, "Even at home, I'm lonely. I sit in my room sometimes and cry. It's so hard to make friends ... I sometimes walk around the neighborhood at night, just hoping to find someone to talk to. But I just end up coming home."

When Jackson turned 21 in August 1979, he hired John Branca as his manager. Jackson told Branca that he wanted to be the biggest and wealthiest star in showbusiness. He was upset about what he perceived as the underperformance of Off the Wall, feeling it had deserved the Grammy Award for Album of the Year. He also felt undervalued by the music industry; in 1980, when Rolling Stone declined to run a cover story on him, Jackson responded: "I've been told over and over that black people on the cover of magazines doesn't sell copies ... Just wait. Some day those magazines are going to be begging me for an interview. Maybe I'll give them one, and maybe I won't."

For his next album, Jackson wanted to create an album where "every song was a killer". He was frustrated by albums that would have "one good song, and the rest were like B-sides ... Why can't every one be like a hit song? Why can't every song be so great that people would want to buy it if you could release it as a single? ... That was my purpose for the next album."

== Production and composition ==
=== Recording ===
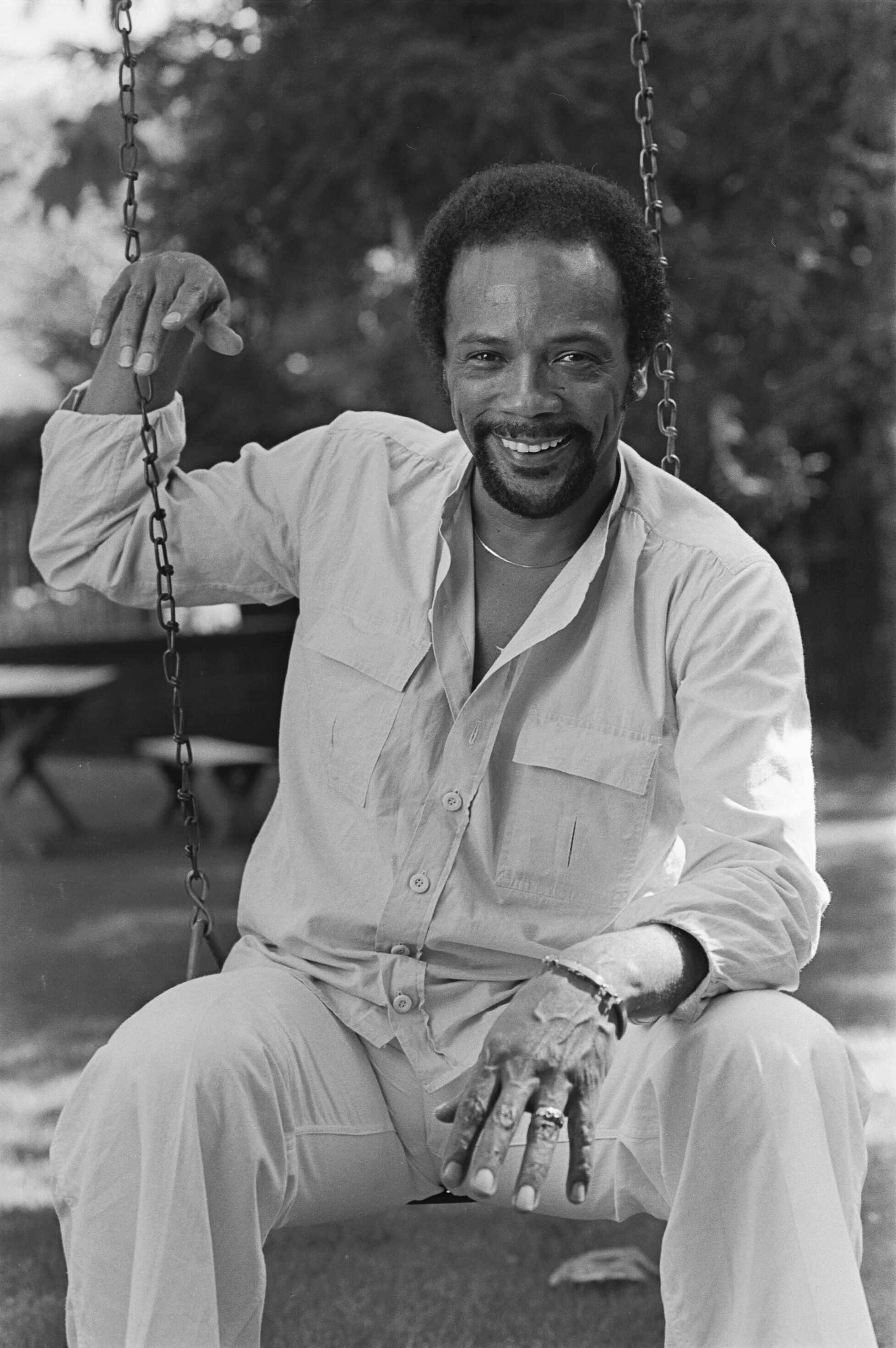
Thriller was the second Michael Jackson album produced by Quincy Jones.

Jackson reunited with Off the Wall producer Quincy Jones to record his sixth studio album, his second under the Epic label. They collaborated on 30 songs, nine of which were featured on the album. Thriller was recorded at Westlake Recording Studios in Los Angeles, California, with a production budget of $750,000. The first official recording took place on April 14, 1982, at noon with Jackson and Paul McCartney recording "The Girl Is Mine". After Jones completed Donna Summer's self-titled album, the rest of the album was completed between August and November 8, 1982.

Several members of the band Toto were involved in the album's recording and production. Jackson wrote four songs for the record: "Wanna Be Startin' Somethin'", "The Girl Is Mine", "Beat It" and "Billie Jean". Unlike many artists, Jackson did not write these songs on paper. Instead, he dictated into a sound recorder; when recording he would sing from memory.

The relationship between Jackson and Jones became strained during the recording. Jackson spent much of his time rehearsing dance steps alone. When the album was completed, both Jones and Jackson were unhappy with the result and remixed every song, spending a week on each.

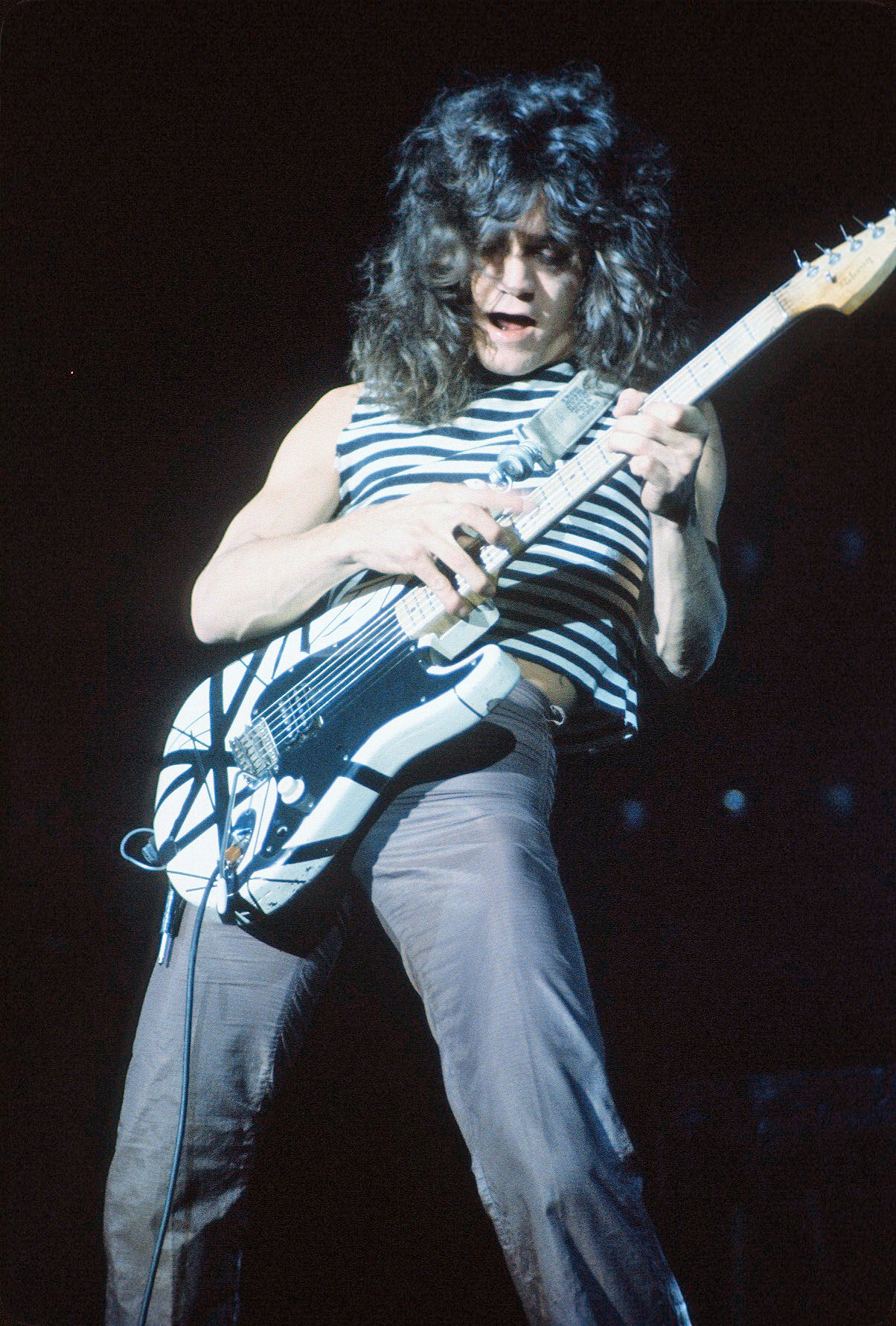
"Beat It" features a guitar solo from Eddie Van Halen.

"Billie Jean" was personal to Jackson, who struggled with obsessed fans. Jones wanted to shorten the long introduction, but Jackson insisted that it remain because it made him want to dance. The ongoing backlash against disco made it necessary to move in a different musical direction from the disco-heavy Off the Wall. Jones and Jackson were determined to make a rock song that would appeal to all tastes and spent weeks looking for a suitable guitarist for the song "Beat It". Eventually, they found Steve Lukather of Toto to play the rhythm guitar parts and Eddie Van Halen of the rock band Van Halen to play the solo.

When Rod Temperton wrote the song "Thriller", he wanted to call it "Starlight" or "Midnight Man", but settled on "Thriller" because he felt the name had merchandising potential. Wanting a notable person to recite the closing lyrics, Jones brought in actor Vincent Price, an acquaintance of Jones' wife; Price completed his part in two takes. Temperton wrote the spoken portion in a taxi on the way to the recording studio. Jones and Temperton said that some recordings were left off the album because they did not have the "edginess" of other album tracks. A cover of "Behind the Mask", originally by the Japanese band Yellow Magic Orchestra, was omitted when the parties could not agree on royalties.

=== Music and lyrics ===
Thriller is primarily a pop album in the styles of post-disco and synth-pop. Its songs explore various genres including funk, rock, adult contemporary, easy listening, hard rock, R&B, and soul. According to Steve Huey of AllMusic, Thriller refined the strengths of Off the Wall; the dance and rock tracks are more aggressive, while the pop tunes and ballads are softer and more soulful. The album includes the ballads "Human Nature", "The Girl Is Mine" and "The Lady in My Life", the funk tracks "Billie Jean" and "Wanna Be Startin' Somethin'", and the disco songs "Baby Be Mine" and "P.Y.T. (Pretty Young Thing)".

"Wanna Be Startin' Somethin'" climaxes in an African-inspired chant (often misidentified as Swahili, but actually syllables based on Duala), giving the song an international flavor. "The Girl Is Mine" tells of two friends' fight over a woman, arguing over who loves her more, and concludes with a rap. The album's songs have a tempo ranging from 80 beats per minute on "The Girl is Mine", to 138 on "Beat It".

Thriller foreshadows the contradictory themes of Jackson's later works. With Thriller, Jackson began using a motif of paranoia and darker themes including supernatural imagery in the title track. This is evident on the songs "Billie Jean", "Wanna Be Startin' Somethin'" and "Thriller". In "Billie Jean", Jackson sings about an obsessive fan who alleges he fathered her child; in "Wanna Be Startin' Somethin'" he argues against media gossip. For "Billie Jean", Jones had Jackson sing overdubs through a six-foot (180 cm) cardboard tube and brought in jazz saxophonist Tom Scott to play the lyricon, a wind-controlled synthesizer. Bassist Louis Johnson ran through his part on a Yamaha bass guitar. The song opens with a long bass-and-drums introduction. "Thriller" includes sound effects such as creaking doors, thunder, footsteps, wind, and howling dogs.

The anti-gang-violence "Beat It" became an homage to West Side Story and was Jackson's first successful rock cross-over piece. Jackson later said of "Beat It", "the point is no one has to be the tough guy, you can walk away from a fight and still be a man. You don't have to die to prove you're a man". "Human Nature", co-written by Steve Porcaro of the band Toto, is moody and introspective, as conveyed in lyrics such as, "Looking out, across the morning, the City's heart begins to beat, reaching out, I touch her shoulder, I'm dreaming of the street".

By the late 1970s, Jackson's abilities as a vocalist were well regarded; AllMusic described him as a "blindingly gifted vocalist". Rolling Stone critic Stephen Holden likened his vocals to the "breathless, dreamy stutter" of Stevie Wonder, and wrote that "Jackson's feathery-timbred tenor is extraordinarily beautiful. It slides smoothly into a startling falsetto that's used very daringly." With the release of Thriller, Jackson could sing low—down to a basso low C—but he preferred to sing higher because pop tenors have more range to create style. Rolling Stone critic Christopher Connelly wrote that Jackson was now singing in a "fully adult voice" that was "tinged by sadness".

"P.Y.T. (Pretty Young Thing)", credited to James Ingram and Quincy Jones, and "The Lady in My Life" by Rod Temperton, gave the album a stronger R&B direction; the latter song was described as "the closest Jackson has come to crooning a sexy, soulful ballad after his Motown years" by J. Randy Taraborrelli. Jackson had already adopted a "vocal hiccup" (first used in 1973 on "It's Too Late to Change the Time"), which he continued to implement in Thriller. The purpose of the hiccup—somewhat like a gulping for air or gasping—is to evoke emotion, be it excitement, sadness, or fear.

=== Cover ===
The cover for Thriller features Jackson in a zip up shirt and white suit that belonged to photographer Dick Zimmerman. The gatefold sleeve reveals a tiger cub at Jackson's leg, which, according to Zimmerman, Jackson kept away from his face, fearing he would be scratched. Another picture from the shoot, with Jackson embracing the cub, was used for the 2001 special edition of Thriller.

== Release and commercial reception ==
Thriller was released on November 29, 1982, through Epic Records and internationally by CBS Records. Originally, the label planned to issue the album in time for a Christmas release, before pushing it into the following January to allow Jones and Jackson more time to complete the tracks. However, copies of Thriller were leaked to radio stations early, and the label decided to rush-release the album on November 29.

Thriller reached number one on the Billboard Top LPs & Tape chart on February 26, 1983. It sold one million copies worldwide per week at its peak. Thriller was the best-selling album in the United States in 1983 and 1984, making it the first album to be the best-selling for two years. It also spent a record 37 weeks at number one on the Billboard 200, from February 26, 1983, to April 14, 1984, and has remained on the chart for 715 nonconsecutive weeks (and counting). On Canada's RPM Top 100 albums it was on the charts for 108 weeks between December 18, 1982, and February 2, 1985.

Thriller was Jackson's global breakthrough, topping the charts in Australia, Austria, Canada, France, Italy, Japan, the Netherlands, Switzerland and the United Kingdom. It has gained Diamond certifications in Argentina, Canada, Denmark, France, Mexico and the UK. Thriller sells an estimated 130,000 copies in the US per year; it reached number two in the US Catalog charts in February 2003 and number 39 in the UK in March 2007. It is the sixth-best-selling album in the UK.

By the end of 1983, Thriller became the world's best-selling album, having sold 32 million copies. By the end of the decade, it had reached sales of 48 million copies. It remains the best-selling album of all time, having sold over 70 million copies worldwide. (Note: Representatives for Sony and Jackson's estate say that Thriller has sold 105 million copies globally. Although sales estimates for Thriller have been as high as 110 million copies, these sales figures are unreliable according to various music specialists.) On December 16, 2015, Thriller became the first album to be certified 30× platinum by the Recording Industry Association of America (RIAA), for shipments of at least 30 million units in the US. Following the inclusion of streaming and tracks sales into the RIAA album awards in 2017, Thriller was certified 33× platinum, representing 33 million album-equivalent units. As of August 2021, the album has been certified 34× platinum in the US, denoting 34 million album-equivalent units.

=== Singles ===
Seven singles were released from Thriller. The first, "The Girl Is Mine", was criticized as a poor choice; critics predicted that the album would disappoint and suggested that Jackson was bowing to a white audience. "The Girl Is Mine" topped the Billboard Hot Black Singles chart, reached number two on the Billboard Hot 100 and reached number one on the Hot Adult Contemporary Tracks chart.

"Billie Jean" was released in January 1983. It reached number one on the Billboard Hot 100 chart, where it remained for seven weeks. It also topped the Billboard Hot Black Singles chart within three weeks, and it remained at number one for nine weeks. Billboard ranked it as the No. 2 song for 1983. It topped the charts in 9 countries and reached the top 10 in many others. "Billie Jean" was one of the best-selling singles of 1983, helping Thriller become the best-selling album of all time. It also became Jackson's best-selling solo single. "Billie Jean" was described as a pioneer of "sleek, post-soul pop music" and also the beginning of a more paranoid lyrical style for Jackson, a trademark of his later music.

The third single, "Beat It", also reached number one on the Black Singles chart. Billboard ranked it number five for 1983. "Beat It" reached number one in Spain and the Netherlands. "Wanna Be Startin' Somethin'" was Jackson's fourth consecutive top-ten single from Thriller on the Billboard Hot 100, peaking at number five. "Human Nature" reached number seven on the Billboard Hot 100 and number 2 on the Billboard Adult Contemporary chart. "P.Y.T. (Pretty Young Thing)" charted at number ten on the Billboard Hot 100.

"Thriller", the final single, was released in November 1983. It was not initially planned for release, as Epic saw it as a novelty song; according to executive Walter Yetnikoff, "Who wants a single about monsters?" By mid-1983, when sales of Thriller began to decline, Jackson convinced Epic to release "Thriller", backed by a new music video. It reached number four on the Billboard Hot 100 and number three on the Billboard Hot Black Singles chart.

=== Music videos ===
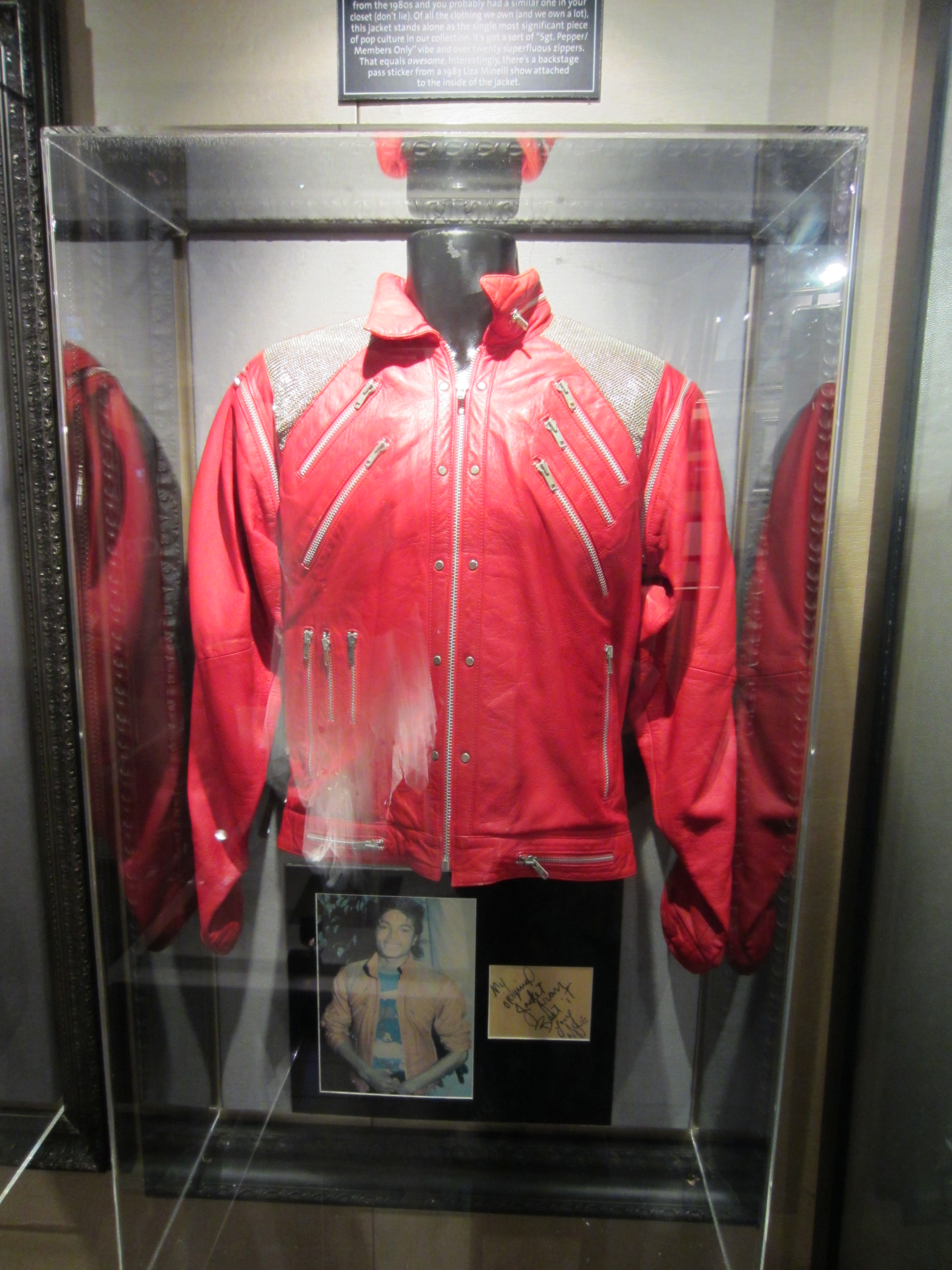
Jacket worn by Jackson in the video "Beat It" displayed at the Hard Rock On Wheels Exhibit in Miami

The "Billie Jean" music video debuted on March 10, 1983, on MTV. It brought MTV—until then a fairly new and unknown music channel—to mainstream attention. It was one of the first videos by a black artist to be aired regularly by the channel, as the network's executives felt black music was not "rock" enough. Directed by Steve Barron, the video shows a photographer who follows Jackson. The paparazzo never catches him, and when photographed Jackson fails to materialize on the developed picture. He dances to Billie Jean's hotel room and as he walks along a sidewalk, each tile lights up at his touch.

The "Beat It" music video had its premiere on MTV during primetime on March 31, 1983. To add authenticity to the production but also to foster peace between them, Jackson had the idea to cast members of rival Los Angeles street gangs the Crips and the Bloods, and included around 80 genuine gang members. Its plot is Jackson bringing two gangsters together through the power of music and dance. It is also notable for its "mass choreography" of synchronized dancers, which would become the hallmark of Jackson's music videos.

The "Thriller" music video premiered on MTV on December 2, 1983. In the video, Jackson and his girlfriend (played by Ola Ray) are confronted by zombies while walking home from a movie theater; Jackson becomes a zombie and performs a dance routine with a horde of the undead. It was named the greatest video of all time by MTV in 1999, by VH1 in 2001, and by Time in 2011. In 2009, it became the first music video to be selected for the National Film Registry by the Library of Congress. The Library described it as "the most famous music video of all time".

== Critical reception ==
Professional ratings
Review scores
Source	Rating
Melody Maker	5/5 stars
Greensboro Daily News	4/5 stars
The Orlando Sentinel	4/5 stars
Record Mirror	4/5 stars
Rolling Stone	4/5 stars
Smash Hits	7.5/10
The Village Voice	A−

Despite receiving positive reviews, some critics initially felt that Thriller was inferior to Off the Wall. Mike Gardner of Record Mirror gave Thriller a positive review, though noted that the album "aims for cosy comfort" instead of the 'state of the art' technicality present in Off the Wall. Gavin Martin of NME gave an underwhelming review of Thriller, claiming that it sounds like it was released before Off the Wall. Martin was particularly critical of Jackson's songwriting: "the overall feeling that comes from Thriller is that of barely developed artist being given too much artistic control". Writing for Smash Hits, Bev Hillier noted that while Thriller is not as "instant" as Off the Wall, it is still a "first class product". In another NME review, Paolo Hewitt wrote, "this is not a good LP", described the album as "bland", and opionated that it contains "lyrical cliches". Hewitt highlights "Wanna Be Startin' Somethin'" and "Billie Jean" as the only songs "worthy of mention".

Retrospective ratings
Review scores
Source	Rating
AllMusic	5/5 stars
Blender	5/5 stars
Christgau's Record Guide	A
Encyclopedia of Popular Music	5/5 stars
Entertainment Weekly	A
MusicHound Rock	5/5 stars
Q	5/5 stars
The Rolling Stone Album Guide	5/5 stars
Slant Magazine	5/5 stars
Tom Hull – on the Web	A
Uncut	4/5 stars

In Musician, J. D. Considine wrote that Thriller "sounds every bit like a winner" and that Jackson and Jones did a "magnificent job of recreating the lithe grooves and carefully manicured arrangements" that defined the sound of Off the Wall. John Rockwell wrote in The New York Times that Thriller is "a wonderful pop record, the latest statement by one of the great singers in popular music today" and that there are "hits here, too, lots of them". Rockwell believed it helped breach "the destructive barriers that spring up regularly between white and black music", especially as "white publications and radio stations that normally avoid black music seem willing to pretend he isn't black after all". In a review for Rolling Stone, Christopher Connelly called Thriller "zesty" with a "harrowing, dark message". Connelly emphasized Jackson's musical progression from Off the Wall, writing, "Jackson's new attitude gives Thriller a deeper, if less visceral, emotional urgency than any of his previous work, and marks another watershed in the creative development of this prodigiously talented performer." In The Village Voice, Robert Christgau said "this is virtually a hits-plus-filler job, but at such a high level it's almost classic anyway".

Thriller soon garnered greater acclaim than it initially did upon release. In The New York Times, Holden highlighted the album's significance: "Pop music will never be quite the same in the wake of Michael Jackson's ''Thriller,'' [...] Today echoes of Michael Jackson's quavering, exhilarated tenor resound across the pop spectrum, especially in the records of youthful pop- soul singers coming up the ladder." Jay Cocks of Time summed up the three main singles from the album, saying, "The pulse of America and much of the rest of the world moves irregularly, beating in time to the tough strut of 'Billie Jean', the asphalt aria of 'Beat It', the supremely cool chills of 'Thriller'." Cocks also praised Thriller for being "a thorough restoration of confidence, a rejuvenation" and "bringing black music back to mainstream radio".

In 1989, Toronto Star music critics reflected on the albums they had reviewed in the past ten years in order to create a list judging them on the basis of "commercial impact to social import, to strictly musical merit." Thriller was placed at number one on the list, where it was referred to as his "master work" and that "commercial success has since overshadowed Jackson's artistic accomplishments on Thriller, and that's a pity. It was a record for the times, brimming with breathless anticipation and a dread fear of the adult world, a brilliant fantasy that pumped with sexual heat, yet made room for serious reflection". Christgau wrote in Christgau's Record Guide: The '80s (1990), "what we couldn't know is how brilliantly every hit but 'P.Y.T.' would thrive on mass exposure and public pleasure."

=== Awards ===
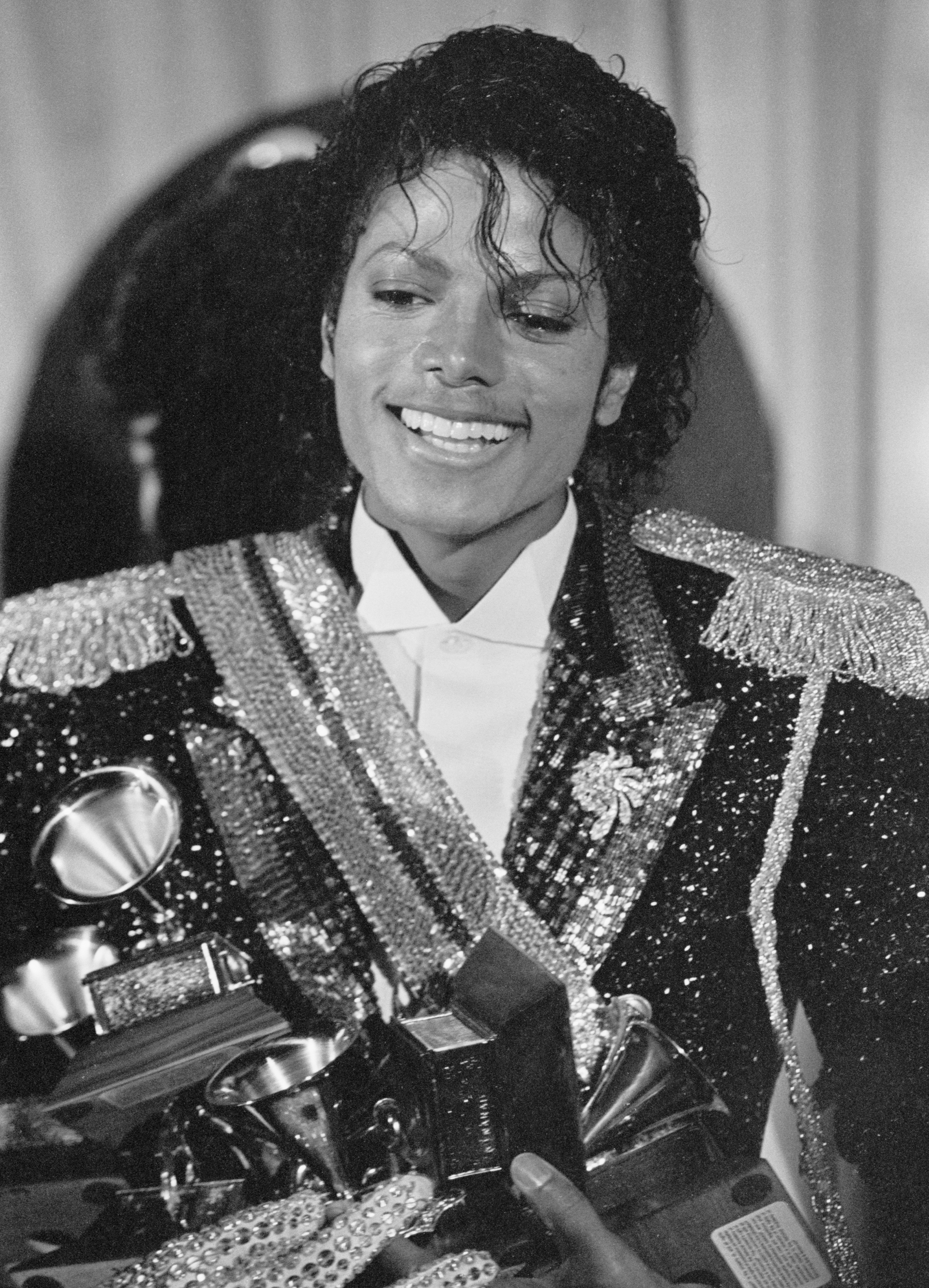
Jackson holding his record-breaking eight Grammy Awards at the 1984 ceremony.

Jackson was nominated for a record 12 Grammy Awards at the 26th Grammy Awards. The album won a record-breaking eight Grammy Awards, including Album of the Year. Jackson won seven of the Grammy Awards for the album, while the eighth Grammy Award went to Bruce Swedien. Richard Harrington of The Washington Post described the ceremony as 'The Michael Jackson Show', writing "it was exactly the kind of one-man show that everyone had anticipated". In winning the Album of the Year award, Jackson became the third-youngest to win the award after Barbra Streisand at 22 and Stevie Wonder at 23.

Jackson also dominated the American Music Awards, winning a record-breaking eight awards, including both Favorite Pop/Rock Album and Favorite Soul/R&B Album, as well as the special Merit award. Jackson won three awards for the music video for "Thriller" at the inaugural MTV Video Music Awards: Best Overall Performance in a Video, Best Choreography in a Video and Viewer's Choice. At the 1984 Brit Awards, Jackson was awarded International Artist and Thriller won British Album of the Year.

Thriller topped The Village Voice's Pazz & Jop poll of 1983. It was recognized as the best-selling album of all time on February 7, 1984, when it was inducted into the Guinness Book of World Records. In 1992, Thriller was awarded the Special Billboard Award to commemorate its 10th anniversary. At the 2002 Billboard Music Awards, as a sign of the album's longevity, it was awarded a second Special Billboard Award as a recognition for spending more weeks at number one on the Billboard 200 than any other album in history.

In 2008, 25 years after its release, Thriller was inducted into the Grammy Hall of Fame and, a few weeks later, was among 25 recordings preserved by the Library of Congress to the National Recording Registry as "culturally significant".

=== Rankings ===
In 2000, Thriller was voted number 64 in Colin Larkin's All Time Top 1000 Albums. It was also ranked number two in the Soul/R&B – All Time Top 50 albums. The book states; it is the finest example of perfect disco-pop, and a record that should be prescribed to musical snobs and manic depressives. In 2003, it was ranked at number 20 on the Rolling Stone 500 Greatest Albums of All Time list, maintaining the ranking in a 2012 revised list; it is the highest-ranked pop album on both lists. In a 2020 updated list by Rolling Stone, Thriller was ranked number 12. It was ranked by the National Association of Recording Merchandisers (NARM), in conjunction with the Rock and Roll Hall of Fame, at number three on its list of the Definitive 200 Albums of All Time. "Beat It" and "Billie Jean" were both included in the Rock and Roll Hall of Fame's 500 Songs That Shaped Rock and Roll. In 2006, Time included Thriller in its list of the All-TIME 100 Albums. In 2009, music critics for MTV Base and VH1 both listed Thriller as the best album released since 1981. Thriller, along with other critic favorites, were then polled by the public. 40,000 people found Thriller to be the Best Album of all time by MTV Generation, gaining a third of all votes. In 2012, Slant Magazine ranked Thriller as the best album of the 1980s. Thriller was ranked third on the Greatest of All Time Billboard 200 Albums. Billboard also ranked the album fourth on its list of All 92 Diamond-Certified Albums Ranked from Worst to Best: Critic's Take. In 2018, The Independent named Thriller the "most inspiring album of all time".

== Legacy and influence ==
=== Music industry ===
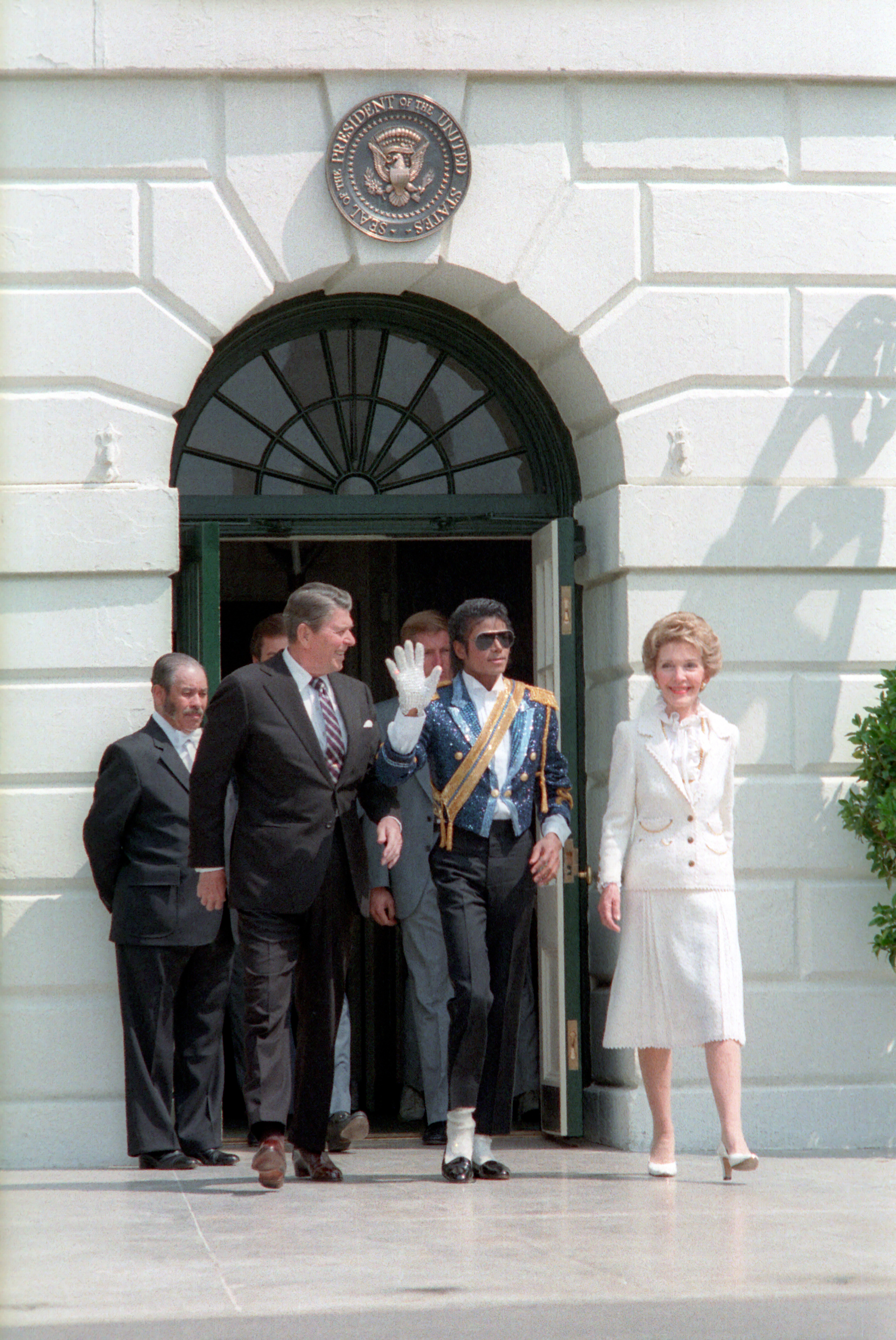
Jackson (center) with US President Ronald Reagan and First Lady Nancy Reagan at the White House in 1984

Thriller's success gave Jackson cultural significance never before attained by an African American in the entertainment industry. Blender described Jackson as the "late 20th century's preeminent pop icon", while The New York Times wrote that he was a "musical phenomenon" and that "in the world of pop music, there is Michael Jackson and there is everybody else". Richard Corliss of Time hailed Thriller as "the greatest pop album of all time". The Times asserted that it is "still the best pop album" following the release of Thriller 40, a 40th-anniversary reissue of the album.

Jackson changed the way the industry functioned, both as an artistic persona and as a financial, profitable entity. Thriller was released around the peak of the album era, which had positioned full-length records ahead of singles as the dominant form of recorded-music consumption and artistic expression in the industry. The success of Thriller's singles marked a brief resurgence in the sales of the format, and changed notions about the number of singles that could be successfully released from an album.

His attorney John Branca said that Jackson had achieved the highest royalty rate in the music industry to that point: about $2 ($6.2 in 2025 dollars) for each album sold. As a result, Jackson earned record-breaking profits from compact disc sales and from the sale of copies of the documentary, The Making of Michael Jackson's Thriller, produced by Jackson and John Landis. Funded by MTV, the film sold over 350,000 copies in its first few months. More profits came from novelties such as the Michael Jackson doll, which appeared in stores in May 1984 at a price of $12 ($37 in 2025 dollars). Thriller's position in American culture was described by biographer J. Randy Taraborrelli: "At some point, Thriller stopped selling like a leisure item—like a magazine, a toy, tickets to a hit movie—and started selling like a household staple".

In a statement at the album's release, Gil Friesen, then-president of A&M Records, said, "The whole industry has a stake in this success". Others later agreed. Time magazine speculated that "the fallout from Thriller has given the [music] business its best years since the heady days of 1978, when it had an estimated total domestic revenue of $4.1 billion". Time summed up Thriller's impact as a "restoration of confidence" for an industry bordering on "the ruins of punk and the chic regions of synthesizer pop". The publication described Jackson's influence at that point as, "Star of records, radio, rock video. A one-man rescue team for the music business. A songwriter who sets the beat for a decade. A dancer with the fanciest feet on the street. A singer who cuts across all boundaries of taste and style and color too".

The '80s were when stars replaced artists as bearers of significance... When art is intellectual property, image and aura subsume aesthetic substance, whatever exactly that is. When art is capital, sales interface with aesthetic quality—Thriller's numbers are part of its experience.

— Robert Christgau in Christgau's Record Guide: The '80s (1990)

As Thriller and "Billie Jean" sought to reach their market demographic, MTV and cable TV had a much smaller market share than broadcast television stations in the United States. CBS/Epic Records sought to promote Thriller with a national broadcast TV audience on ABC, NBC and CBS affiliate stations, as well as major independent TV stations. The national broadcast TV premiere of the Thriller album's first video, "Billie Jean", was during the week of Halloween in October 1984 and was the idea of Video Concert Hall executive producers Charles Henderson and Jerry Crowe. Video Concert Hall, the first nationwide music video TV network, taped the one-hour special in Hollywood and Atlanta, where the TV studios of Video Concert Hall were located. The Thriller TV special was hosted by Thriller video co-star Vincent Price, distributed by Henderson-Crowe Syndications, Inc. and aired in the top 20 TV markets and much of the United States, including TV stations WNEW (New York), WFLD (Chicago), KTTV (Los Angeles), WPLG (Miami), WQTV (Boston) and WXIA (Atlanta), for a total of 150 TV stations.

Thriller had a pioneering impact on black-music genres and crossover. According to ethnomusicologist Miles White, the album completely defined the "sound of post-disco contemporary R&B" and "updated the crossover aesthetic that had been the holy grail of black popular music since Louis Jordan in the 1940s". Noting its unprecedented dominance of mainstream pop music by an African-American artist, White goes on to write that "the record's song selection and sound aesthetics played to soul and pop sensibilities alike, appealing to a broad audience and selling across lines of race, gender, class and generation", while demonstrating Jackson's emergence from Motown as "the king of pop-soul crossover". Entertainment Weekly writer Simon Vozick-Levinson praised it as "the greatest pop-soul album". Included in their list of The 40 Most Groundbreaking Albums of All Time, Rolling Stone wrote:

It's hard to imagine the present-day musical landscape without Thriller, which changed the game both sonically and marketwise. The album's nervy, outsized blend of pop, rock and soul would send seismic waves throughout radio, inviting both marquee crossovers (like Eddie Van Halen's guitar solo on "Beat It") and sneakier attempts at genre-meshing. The album's splashy, cinematic videos — from the John Landis-directed short film that promoted "Thriller" to the West Side Story homage accompanying "Beat It" — legitimized the still-nascent form and forced MTV to incorporate black artists into its playlists. Its promotional strategy, which led to seven of its nine tracks being released as singles, raised the bar for what, exactly, constituted a "hit-laden" LP. Beyond breaking ground, it broke records, showing just how far pop could reach: the biggest selling album of all time, the first album to win eight Grammys in a single night and the first album to stay in the Top 10 charts for a year.

Epic Records also reflected on the importance of the album: "More than just an album, Thriller has remained a global cultural multi-media phenomenon for both the 20th and the 21st centuries, smashing musical barriers and changing the frontiers of pop forever. The music on Thriller is so dynamic and singular that it defied any definition of rock, pop or soul that had gone before." Alan Light writing in Rolling Stone explained the historic significance of the album: "In today's world of declining sales and fragmented audiences, it is almost impossible to imagine how much this one album dominated and united the culture."

From the moment Thriller was released, it set the standard for the music industry: artists, record labels, producers, marketers and even choreographers. The music video was ahead of its time and it is considered a monumental one—not only in Jackson's career, but also in the history of pop music. Epic Records' approach to creating a song and video that would appeal to the mass market ended up influencing the way that professionals now market and release their songs. John Landis' production of a mini-movie, rather than the usual short music video, would raise the bar for other directors and producers.

=== Music videos and racial equality ===
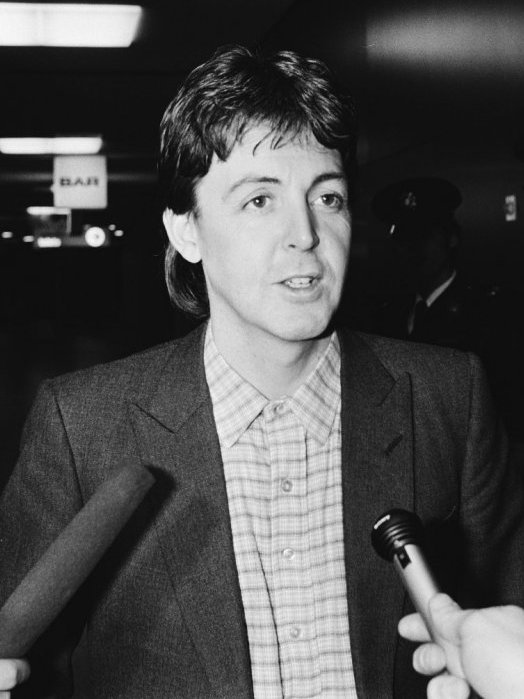
Thriller's music videos and singles—including the Paul McCartney duet "The Girl Is Mine"—are credited with helping promote racial equality in the United States.

Before the success of Thriller, many felt Jackson had struggled to get MTV airtime due to being black. CBS Records president Walter Yetnikoff told MTV: "I'm not going to give you any more videos and I'm going to go public and fucking tell them about the fact you don't want to play music by a black guy." Yetnikoff persuaded MTV to begin airing "Billie Jean" and "Beat It", which led to a long partnership and helped other black artists to gain mainstream recognition. MTV denies claims of racism in their broadcasting.

The popularity of Jackson's videos, such as "Beat It" and "Billie Jean", helped popularize MTV, and its focus shifted towards pop and R&B. Jackson transformed the medium of music video into an artform and promotional tool through the use of complex storylines, dance routines, special effects, and celebrity cameos.

When the 14-minute-long "Thriller" video aired, MTV ran it twice an hour to meet demand. The video marked an increase in scale for music videos and has been routinely named the best music video ever. The video is credited with transforming music videos into a serious art form, breaking down racial barriers in popular entertainment, and popularizing the making-of documentary format. Many elements have had a lasting impact on popular culture such as the zombie dance and Jackson's red jacket designed by Landis's wife Deborah Nadoolman.

Author, music critic and journalist Nelson George wrote in 2004, "It's difficult to hear the songs from Thriller and disengage them from the videos. For most of us the images define the songs. In fact it could be argued that Michael is the first artist of the MTV age to have an entire album so intimately connected in the public imagination with its imagery". Short films like Thriller largely remained unique to Jackson, while the group dance sequence in "Beat It" has been frequently imitated. The choreography in Thriller has become a part of global pop culture, replicated everywhere from Bollywood to prisons in the Philippines.

Jackson's success as a black artist was unprecedented. Time wrote in 1984: "Jackson is the biggest thing since the Beatles. He is the hottest single phenomenon since Elvis Presley. He just may be the most popular black singer ever." According to The Washington Post, Thriller paved the way for other African-American artists to achieve mainstream recognition, such as Prince. Christgau credited "The Girl Is Mine" for giving radio exposure to the idea of interracial love.

=== Reappraisal ===
Thriller has continued to receive critical acclaim. In 2024, Andrew R. Chow wrote in Time that Thriller is "a towering pillar of American culture" and "the gold standard to which all pop artists aspire in its beloved omnipresence". In 2026, The Washington Post included Thriller in its list of 'The 25 most influential works of American culture in celebration of the United States' 250th birthday.

Stephen Thomas Erlewine of AllMusic wrote that it had something to interest everyone. He believed it showcased harder funk and hard rock while remaining "undeniably fun", and wrote that "Wanna Be Startin' Somethin'", was "the freshest funk on the album [but] the most claustrophobic, scariest track Jackson ever recorded." Erlewine felt it was an improvement on Jackson's previous album, although he was critical of the title track, describing it as "ridiculous" and "sucked out the momentum" of the record. In The New Rolling Stone Album Guide (2004), Jon Pareles wrote that Jackson had "doubled his ambitions and multiplied his audience ... Thriller had extra musical help in becoming the best-selling non compilation album of all time: Jackson's dancing feet and dazzling stage presence, amplified by the newfound promotional reach of music video and the Reagan era's embrace of glossy celebrity. But especially in the album's seven hit singles (out of nine songs), the music stands on its own." Culture critic Nelson George wrote that Jackson "has educated R. Kelly, Usher, Justin Timberlake and countless others with Thriller as a textbook".

== Reissues and catalog sales ==
Thriller was reissued on October 16, 2001, in an expanded set, Thriller: Special Edition. The album is remastered and includes a new booklet and bonus material, including the songs "Someone in the Dark", "Carousel" and Jackson's original "Billie Jean" demo, as well as audio interviews with Jones and Temperton. Sony also hired sound engineer and mixer Mick Guzauski to create 5.1-channel surround sound mixes of Thriller and Jackson's other albums for the Super Audio CD format, but Jackson did not approve the mixes. Consequently, Thriller was issued on SACD only in a stereo version. A surround sound version of Thriller would not be realized until November 2022, when Sony created and released 360 Reality Audio and Dolby Atmos mixes of Thriller for Amazon Music and Apple Music respectively in honor of the album's 40th anniversary.

In February 2008, Epic Records released Thriller 25; Jackson served as executive producer. Thriller 25 appeared on CD, USB and vinyl with seven bonus tracks, the new song "For All Time", a snippet of Price's voiceover and five remixes featuring American artists Fergie, will.i.am, Kanye West and Akon. It also included a DVD featuring three music videos, the Motown 25 "Billie Jean" performance and a booklet with a message from Jackson. The ballad "For All Time" supposedly dates from 1982, but is often credited as being from the Dangerous sessions.

Thriller 25 was a commercial success and did particularly well as a reissue. It peaked at number one in eight countries and Europe. It peaked at number two in the US, number three in the UK and reached the top 10 in over 30 national charts. It was certified Gold in 11 countries including the UK, received a 2× Gold certification in France and received platinum certification in Poland. In the United States, Thriller 25 was the second-best-selling album of its release week, selling one hundred and sixty six thousand copies, just fourteen thousand short of reaching the number one position. It was ineligible for the Billboard 200 chart as a re-release but entered the Pop Catalog Charts at number one (where it stayed for ten non-consecutive weeks), with the best sales on that chart since December 1996. With the arrival of Halloween, Thriller 25 spent an eleventh non-consecutive week atop the US catalog chart. This brought US sales of the album to 688,000 copies, making it the best-selling catalog album of 2008. This was Jackson's best launch since Invincible in 2001, selling three million copies worldwide in 12 weeks.

After Jackson's death in June 2009, Thriller set additional records. The album sold 101,000 units in the US on the chart week ending July 1, 2009 and was the third biggest-selling album of the week. The album placed at number three on the Top Pop Catalog Albums chart. The following week the album sold 187,000 units in the US on the chart week ending July 8, 2009 and was the second biggest-selling album of the week. Songs from Thriller also helped Jackson become the first artist to sell more than one million song downloads in a week. According to Nielsen SoundScan, Thriller was the 14th best-selling album of 2009 in the United States, with 1.27 million copies sold. Thriller sold 350,000 copies in France, 1.27 million in the United States and an estimated 4 million copies worldwide in 2009 following his death. Since 2022, Thriller has sold over 740,000 vinyl records alone worldwide according to the IFPI Having been certified for 29x Platinum by August 2009, Thriller has gone onto sell over 6,000,000 units in the United States since Michael Jackson's death according to Luminate, with estimated sales of 36 million units to date.

For one week beginning November 20, 2015, Google Play Music offered an exclusive free copy of the album to its users in the US which included the 1981 demo of "Billie Jean" as an additional track. On November 18, 2022, Sony Music released Thriller 40, a 40th-anniversary reissue of Thriller including a bonus disc containing outtakes from the original recording sessions. The 2022 reissue was followed by a 2023 documentary.

== Track listing ==
Side one
No.	Title	Writer(s)	Length
1.	"Wanna Be Startin' Somethin'"	Michael Jackson	6:03
2.	"Baby Be Mine"	Rod Temperton	4:20
3.	"The Girl Is Mine" (with Paul McCartney)	Jackson	3:42
4.	"Thriller"	Temperton	5:58
Total length:			20:03

Side two
No.	Title	Writer(s)	Length
1.	"Beat It"	Jackson	4:17
2.	"Billie Jean"	Jackson	4:57
3.	"Human Nature"	Steve Porcaro; John Bettis	4:06
4.	"P.Y.T. (Pretty Young Thing)"	James Ingram; Quincy Jones	3:58
5.	"The Lady in My Life"	Temperton	5:00
Total length:			22:18 42:21

Notes

- The first pressings contain the original album mix of "Billie Jean". The main difference is the low volume "oh no" ad-lib in the second verse.

== Personnel ==
Personnel as listed in the album's liner notes are:

- Michael Jackson – co-producer (1, 3, 5, 6), lead vocals (all tracks), background vocals (1–7, 9), drum programming (1, 4), drum case beater (5), handclaps (8), horn arrangements and bathroom stomp board (1), vocal arrangements (1, 3, 5, 6), rhythm arrangements (1, 5, 6), synthesizer arrangements (6)
- Quincy Jones – producer (all tracks), rhythm arrangements (1, 3, 5), vocal arrangements (3), musical arrangements (8)
- Bruce Swedien – recording engineer and audio mixer (all tracks), effects (4)
- Matt Forger – engineer (2, 3, 7–9)
- Humberto Gatica – engineer (3, 7–9)
- Bernie Grundman – mastering engineer (2, 3, 7–9)
- Steve Bates – assistant engineer (3, 7–9)
- Mark Ettel – assistant engineer (3, 7–9)
- Donn Landee – engineer (5 - guitar solo)
- Paul McCartney – lead vocals (3)
- Vincent Price – voice-over (4)
- Paul Jackson Jr. – guitar (5, 8, 9)
- Steve Lukather – guitars (3, 5, 7), bass guitar (5), musical arrangements (7)
- Dean Parks – guitar (3)
- Eddie Van Halen – guitar solo (5)
- David Williams – guitar (1, 2, 4, 6)
- Louis Johnson – bass guitar (1, 3, 6, 8, 9), handclaps (8)
- Tom Bahler – Synclavier (5)
- Brian Banks – synthesizer (4), synthesizer programming (2)
- Michael Boddicker – synthesizers (1, 2), Emulator (6–9), Vocoder (8), background vocals (1)
- Bruce Cannon – effects (4)
- David Foster – synthesizer (3), synthesizer arrangement (3)
- James Ingram – background vocals (1, 8), keyboards, handclaps, and musical arrangements (8)
- Anthony Marinelli – synthesizer programming (2, 4)
- David Paich – synthesizers (2, 7, 9), rhythm arrangements and piano (3), musical arrangements (7)
- Greg Phillinganes – keyboards (2, 4), synthesizers (1, 2, 4–6, 8), Fender Rhodes (1, 3, 5, 6, 9), synthesizer programming and handclaps (8)
- Steve Porcaro – synthesizers (5, 7, 9), synthesizer programming (2, 3, 5, 7), musical arrangements (7)
- Greg Smith – Synergy (5), synthesizer (6)
- Rod Temperton – synthesizer (4), rhythm and vocal arrangements (2, 4, 9)
- Bill Wolfer – keyboards (5), synthesizer (1, 6), programming (6)
- Leon "Ndugu" Chancler – drums (2, 6, 8)
- Jeff Porcaro – drums (3, 5, 7, 9)
- Paulinho da Costa – percussion (1, 7)
- Nelson Hayes – bathroom stomp board (1)
- Steven Ray – bathroom stomp board (1), handclaps (8)
- Chris Shepard – vibraslap (5)
- Gary Grant – trumpet and flugelhorn (1, 2, 4)
- Jerry Hey – horn arrangements, trumpet, and flugelhorn (1, 2, 4), string arrangements (3, 6), strings conductor (3)
- Bill Reichenbach – trombone (1, 2, 4)
- Larry Williams – saxophone and flute (1, 2, 4)
- Jerry Lubbock – strings conductor (6)
- Jerry Vinci – concertmaster (3)
- Howard Hewett – background vocals (8)
- Bunny Hull – background vocals (1, 8)
- Janet Jackson – background vocals (8)
- La Toya Jackson – background vocals (8)
- Becky López – background vocals (1, 8)
- Julia Waters – background vocals (1)
- Maxine Waters Willard – background vocals (1)
- Oren Waters – background vocals (1)

== Charts ==
=== Weekly charts ===
Weekly chart performance
Chart (1982–2026)	Peak position
Australian Albums (Kent Music Report)	1
Austrian Albums (Ö3 Austria)	3
Belgian Albums (Ultratop Flanders)	3
Belgian Albums (Ultratop Wallonia)	1
Canada Top Albums/CDs (RPM)	1
Canadian Albums (Billboard)	3
Croatian International Albums (HDU)	8
Danish Albums (Hitlisten)	13
Dutch Albums (Album Top 100)	1
European Albums (European Top 100 Albums)	1
Finnish Albums (Suomen virallinen albumilista)	1
French Albums (SNEP)	1
German Albums (Offizielle Top 100)	1
German Pop Albums (Offizielle Top 100)	2
Greek Albums (IFPI)	8
Greece Albums (Billboard)	1
Hungarian Albums (MAHASZ)	1
Iceland Albums (Íslenski Listinn)	4
Israeli Albums (Kol Yisrael)	2
Italian Albums (FIMI)	1
Japanese LPs (Oricon)	1
Japanese Hot Albums (Billboard Japan)	13
Lithuanian Albums (AGATA)	3
New Zealand Albums (RMNZ)	1
Norwegian Albums (VG-lista)	6
Polish Albums (ZPAV)	5
Portuguese Albums (AFP)	29
Spanish Albums (Promusicae)	4
Swedish Albums (Sverigetopplistan)	1
Swiss Albums (Schweizer Hitparade)	4
UK Albums (Official Charts)	1
US Billboard 200	1
US Top R&B/Hip-Hop Albums (Billboard)	1

=== Year-end charts ===
Year-end chart performance
Chart (1983)	Position
Australia (Kent Music Report)	1
Austria (Ö3 Austria Top 40)	1
Canada (RPM Top Albums)	1
Germany (Official German Charts)	2
Japan (Oricon)	6
Netherlands (Album Top 100)	1
New Zealand (RMNZ)	2
UK Albums (OCC)	1
US Billboard Top LPs & Tape	1
US Hot Black Albums	1

Year-end chart performance
Chart (1984)	Position
Australia (Kent Music Report)	2
Austria (Ö3 Austria Top 40)	3
Canada (RPM Top Albums)	4
Germany (Official German Charts)	5
Japan (Oricon)	1
Netherlands (Album Top 100)	4
New Zealand (RMNZ)	4
Switzerland (Schweizer Hitparade)	1
UK Albums (OCC)	6
US Billboard Top LPs & Tape	1
US Hot Black Albums	2

Year-end chart performance
Chart (1988)	Position
German Albums (Official German Charts)	38

Year-end chart performance
Chart (2003)	Position
UK Albums (OCC)	143

Year-end chart performance
Chart (2009)	Position
Australia (ARIA)	32
Germany (Official German Charts)	40
US Billboard Comprehensive Albums	16
US Billboard Top Internet Albums	16
US Billboard Top Pop Catalog Albums	16

Year-end chart performance
Chart (2010)	Position
Australian Catalogue Albums (ARIA)	47
US Billboard 200	137
US Billboard Top Pop Catalog Albums	7

Year-end chart performance
Chart (2016)	Position
US Billboard 200	178

Year-end chart performance
Chart (2018)	Position
US Billboard 200	190

Year-end chart performance
Chart (2019)	Position
US Billboard 200	129

Year-end chart performance
Chart (2020)	Position
US Billboard 200	111
US Top R&B/Hip-Hop Albums (Billboard)	97

Year-end chart performance
Chart (2021)	Position
Belgian Albums (Ultratop Flanders)	182
Dutch Albums (Album Top 100)	87
US Billboard 200	73
US Top R&B/Hip-Hop Albums (Billboard)	52

Year-end chart performance
Chart (2022)	Position
Belgian Albums (Ultratop Flanders)	79
Belgian Albums (Ultratop Wallonia)	79
Dutch Albums (Album Top 100)	36
US Billboard 200	94
US Top R&B/Hip-Hop Albums (Billboard)	65

Year-end chart performance
Chart (2023)	Position
Belgian Albums (Ultratop Flanders)	118
Belgian Albums (Ultratop Wallonia)	135
Dutch Albums (Album Top 100)	60
US Billboard 200	59
US Top R&B/Hip-Hop Albums (Billboard)	36

Year-end chart performance
Chart (2024)	Position
Belgian Albums (Ultratop Flanders)	121
Belgian Albums (Ultratop Wallonia)	169
Dutch Albums (Album Top 100)	55
US Billboard 200	97
US Top R&B/Hip-Hop Albums (Billboard)	42

Year-end chart performance
Chart (2025)	Position
Belgian Albums (Ultratop Flanders)	94
Belgian Albums (Ultratop Wallonia)	115
Dutch Albums (Album Top 100)	36
German Albums (Offizielle Top 100)	52
US Billboard 200	95

=== Decade-end charts ===
Decade-end chart performance
Chart (1980–1989)	Position
Australia (Kent Music Report)	3
Japan (Oricon)	2
UK Albums (OCC)	3

Decade-end chart performance
Chart (2010–2019)	Position
UK Vinyl Albums (OCC)	74

== Certifications and sales ==
Certifications and sales
Region	Certification	Certified units/sales
Argentina (CAPIF)	Diamond	576,779
Australia (ARIA)	17× Platinum	1,190,000^{‡}
Austria (IFPI Austria)	8× Platinum	400,000^{*}
Belgium sales as of 1984	—	300,000
Brazil sales as of 2008	—	2,000,000
Canada (Music Canada)	3× Diamond	3,000,000^{‡}
Chile	—	40,000
Colombia	—	300,000
Denmark (IFPI Danmark)	6× Platinum	480,000^{^}
Denmark (IFPI Danmark) reissue	5× Platinum	100,000^{‡}
Finland (Musiikkituottajat)	Platinum	119,061
France (SNEP)	Diamond	3,500,000
Germany (BVMI)	3× Platinum	1,500,000^{^}
Hong Kong (IFPI Hong Kong)	Platinum	50,000
India	—	100,000
Israel	2× Platinum	80,000
Italy	—	1,000,000
Italy (FIMI) sales + streams since 2009	5× Platinum	250,000^{‡}
Japan (RIAJ)	Gold	2,500,000
Mexico (AMPROFON)	2× Diamond+2× Platinum+Gold	2,600,000^{‡}
Netherlands (NVPI)	8× Platinum	2,000,000
New Zealand (RMNZ)	12× Platinum	180,000^{^}
Norway	—	150,000
Singapore	—	25,000
South Africa (RISA)	3× Platinum	120,000
South Korea	—	50,000
Spain	—	500,000
Sweden (GLF)	4× Platinum	400,000^{^}
Switzerland (IFPI Switzerland)	6× Platinum	300,000^{^}
Taiwan sales as of 2009	—	140,000
United Kingdom (BPI)	16× Platinum	4,800,000^{‡}
United States (RIAA)	34× Platinum	34,000,000^{‡}
Yugoslavia	—	112,000
Zimbabwe	—	8,000
Summaries
Europe 1982–1987 sales	—	18,000,000
Europe (IFPI) For sales in 2009	Platinum	1,000,000^{*}
International 1982–1991 sales	—	27,000,000
Worldwide	—	70,000,000
^{*} Sales figures based on certification alone.^{^} Shipments figures based on certification alone.^{‡} Sales+streaming figures based on certification alone.

== Release history ==
Release dates and formats
Region	Date	Edition(s)	Format(s)	Label(s)	Ref.
United States	November 29, 1982	Standard	LP; Cassette	Epic	
United Kingdom	November 29, 1982	Standard	LP; Cassette	Epic; CBS	
Various	November 29, 1982	Standard	LP; Cassette	Epic; CBS	
Japan	November 29, 1982	Standard; Limited	LP; Cassette; Picture disc	Epic/Sony	
Various	1983	Standard	CD	Epic; CBS	
Japan	October 26, 1988	Tour Edition	CD	Epic/Sony	
Japan	July 25, 1991	Standard	CD	Epic; Sony Japan	
Japan	April 1, 2000	Reissue	SACD	Epic; Sony Japan	
Various	October 16, 2001	Special (re-issue)^{[a]}	CD; Gold CD; Cassette	Epic; Legacy; Sony; MJJ	
Japan	October 31, 2001	Special (re-issue)^{[a]}	CD; Gold CD	Epic; Sony Japan; MJJ	
Various	February 8, 2008	Thriller 25; 25th Anniversary; Deluxe^{[b]}	CD; LP; DVD; Digital download	Epic; Legacy; MJJ	
Japan	February 20, 2008	Thriller 25; 25th Anniversary; Deluxe^{[b]}	CD; LP; DVD; Digital download	Epic; Sony Japan; MJJ	
Various	November 18, 2022	Audiophile Edition^{[c]}	Hybrid SACD; LP	Mobile Fidelity Sound Lab; Epic	
Various	November 18, 2022	Thriller 40; 40th Anniversary; Deluxe^{[b]}	CD; LP; Digital download; Streaming	Epic; Legacy; MJJ	

Notes

- ^{^[a]} part of a re-issue promotion of solo albums released under Epic.
- ^{^[b]} deluxe edition available exclusively on digital platforms.
- ^{^[c]} sourced from the original master tapes.

== See also ==
- "Behind the Mask" (song)
- List of 1980s albums considered the best
- List of best-selling albums
- List of best-selling albums by country
- List of best-selling albums in Argentina
- List of best-selling albums in Australia
- List of best-selling albums in Austria
- List of best-selling albums in Belgium
- List of best-selling albums in Brazil
- List of best-selling albums in Canada
- List of best-selling albums in Colombia
- List of best-selling albums in Europe
- List of best-selling albums in Finland
- List of best-selling albums in France
- List of best-selling albums in Germany
- List of best-selling albums in Italy
- List of best-selling albums in Japan
- List of best-selling albums in Mexico
- List of best-selling albums in the Netherlands
- List of best-selling albums in New Zealand
- List of best-selling albums in Spain
- List of best-selling albums in the United Kingdom
- List of best-selling albums in the United States
- List of diamond-certified albums in Argentina
- List of diamond-certified albums in Canada
- List of number-one dance singles of 1983 (U.S.)
