= Video Concert Hall =

US television series

Video Concert Hall (VCH) is a television program that debuted in 1978 or 1979 on the USA Network and on Showtime, featuring an unhosted rotation of music videos. The show was often credited as being the precursor to MTV, Video Concert Hall was reportedly the most popular programming on QUBE, a cable television unit of Warner Communications. VCH, as it was often called, was created by radio and cable television executive Lloyd G. Crowe (Jerry Crowe) and Charles W. Henderson, a journalist who would later work for TriStar Pictures. Video Concert Hall was produced by Henderson-Crowe Productions and the company Video Concert Hall, Ltd. at studios in Atlanta, Georgia. Crowe and Henderson served as executive producers of Video Concert Hall, as well as other top-rated syndicated musical variety TV specials. It is also where artists such as The Police (with Sting), Split Enz, and Gary Numan were first introduced to the American audience en masse.

Billboard said in a cover story that Video Concert Hall was the first-ever nationwide video music programming on cable television, predating MTV by almost three years. Video Concert Hall creators Charles Henderson and Jerry Crowe are considered the "fathers" of television's music video programming.

Video Concert Hall ran daily on USA Network from 1978 to 1981 on a seemingly arbitrary schedule, appearing on early morning, daytime, late night, and early evening timeslots alike for durations ranging from one to four hours. Video Concert Hall was also carried on Showtime, the Satellite Program Network – SPN, and was seen worldwide on AFRTS (the Armed Forces Network) and frequently as video entertainment on commercial airline flights.

Video Concert Hall was also among the first advertising supported cable TV networks. Video Concert Hall was cited as among cable's 15 leading for-profit services in Fortune magazine's 1981 Fortune 500 issue.

The theme music for Video Concert Hall was the first thirty seconds of "Carouselambra" by Led Zeppelin.

Specific to no particular pop music genre, Video Concert Hall featured new wave music, punk rock, disco, funk, soul, and album-oriented rock.
