= Led Zeppelin – The 1980s, Part One =

Cancelled concert tour by Led Zeppelin

Logo of the cancelled tour

Led Zeppelin – The 1980s, Part One was a planned autumn 1980 19-date concert tour of North America by the rock band Led Zeppelin. It was scheduled to take place from 17 October through 15 November of that year and cover much of the East Coast and Midwest. The band cancelled the tour when drummer John Bonham died on 25 September, one day after the group's initial rehearsal for the tour.

== Background ==
In the wake of Led Zeppelin's turmoil-plagued 1977 American tour, which ended abruptly with the sudden death of his son Karac, singer Robert Plant had become averse to touring America with the band. His reluctance to do so persisted despite the success of the In Through the Out Door album and the band's return to the stage at the 1979 Knebworth Festival after a two-year absence. Following the conclusion of Led Zeppelin's successful Tour Over Europe 1980, however, Plant had a change of heart and informed Led Zeppelin's manager Peter Grant that he was willing to undertake an American tour with the band in the autumn of 1980. According to writer Mick Wall, though,

Plant did, however, lay down some strict deal-breaker conditions: no tour should take him away from his family for longer than a month; the band would play a maximum of two shows back-to-back followed by a day off; and, as with the European tour, Superdomes were out, more modest venues in; the aim to re-establish 'contact' with the audience (and, by definition, themselves). Grant and the others wearily complied.

Grant had been concerned about the band's lengthy absence from one of its primary markets, and had correctly viewed the European tour as a way of rekindling Plant's interest in performing in America. Relieved by Plant's change of heart and mindful of the singer's conditions, Grant began planning a nineteen-date tour covering the American East Coast and Midwest, and envisioned Led Zeppelin undertaking additional West Coast and UK tours in early 1981. The band began preparations for the tour with renewed optimism about Led Zeppelin's future, with John Paul Jones in particular commenting that the band had "new energy" and was "almost in a rebirth situation." John Bonham's death, however, resulted in the scuttling of the band's touring plans, and ultimately in the demise of Led Zeppelin itself, with the breakup of the band officially announced on 4 December 1980.

While Jones's view of the state of Led Zeppelin on the eve of the 1980 North American tour was a positive one, writer Chris Welch saw things differently. In his biography of Peter Grant, Welch questioned the wisdom of the band undertaking a U.S. tour at that point in time:

It seems strange that Grant was quite so determined to get the band back to America, given all they had been through and the musicians' state of health. Was it just for the money? They already had an avalanche of income from record sales and publishing royalties. How many more cars, houses, farms, and antiques could they buy?

Welch and writers Dave Lewis and Mick Wall particularly questioned John Bonham's physical and emotional fitness to tour North America at that stage. They note that by the fall of 1980 Bonham's dislike of touring, which had been steadily growing over the years, was virtually as strong as Plant's. He was particularly nervous about the potential backlash he might experience in the U.S. from his involvement in the backstage brawl at the Oakland Coliseum during Led Zeppelin's 1977 tour. As Bonham grew older, moreover, the demands of touring—along with the effects of his alcohol and drug use—took an increasing toll on his energy and stamina, and by 1980 he was struggling with fatigue. He had already permanently dropped his lengthy drum solos from the band's onstage performances. While he came across to Lewis at the time as "delighted" about the upcoming trek, Bonham privately confided on the eve of the ill-fated rehearsals for Led Zeppelin - The 1980s, Part One that he felt depressed and uneasy about going on tour, and that he felt his drumming was no longer up to scratch. He reportedly told Plant, "I've had it with playing drums. Everybody plays better than me. I'll tell you what, when we get to the rehearsal, you play the drums and I'll sing." After that initial rehearsal on 24 September, he complained again about going on tour while engaging in a drinking binge that would prove to be fatal.

Ironically, on 25 September, at the same time the rest of the band and its entourage were learning of Bonham's death, thousands of Led Zeppelin fans in Chicago were eagerly obtaining copies of that day's Chicago Tribune containing mail order applications for the upcoming November concerts. This proved to be fruitless since the tour was immediately cancelled.

== Tour dates and features ==
The intended tour itinerary was as follows:

Date	City	Country	Venue
17 October 1980	Montreal	Canada	Montreal Forum
19 October 1980	Landover	United States	Capital Centre
20 October 1980	Landover	United States	Capital Centre
22 October 1980	Philadelphia	United States	Philadelphia Spectrum
23 October 1980	Landover	United States	Capital Centre
26 October 1980	Cleveland	United States	Richfield Coliseum
27 October 1980	Cleveland	United States	Richfield Coliseum
29 October 1980	Detroit	United States	Joe Louis Arena
30 October 1980	Detroit	United States	Joe Louis Arena
1 November 1980	Buffalo	United States	War Memorial Auditorium
3 November 1980	Philadelphia	United States	Philadelphia Spectrum
4 November 1980	Philadelphia	United States	Philadelphia Spectrum
6 November 1980	Pittsburgh	United States	Pittsburgh Civic Arena
7 November 1980	Pittsburgh	United States	Pittsburgh Civic Arena
9 November 1980	Saint Paul	United States	Civic Center Arena
10 November 1980	Chicago	United States	Chicago Stadium
12 November 1980	Chicago	United States	Chicago Stadium
13 November 1980	Chicago	United States	Chicago Stadium
15 November 1980	Chicago	United States	Chicago Stadium

For the concerts on this tour, the band intended to use a scaled-down approach similar to the one they used for the European tour, which entailed fewer lighting effects, less improvisation, and fewer extended solos than their 1970s concerts. The previously rehearsed but unperformed In Through the Out Door track "Carouselambra" was included in the tentative set-list.
