= C.W. Henderson =

American media executive

Charles W. Henderson is an American media executive, technology executive and journalist. He is the president of media and technology companies NewsRx LLC and ScholarlyMedia LLC. He was the co-founder of Video Concert Hall the first nationwide music video TV network. A USA Today cover story named him one of “6 Who Made a Difference.” He has also been on the cover of Billboard magazine.

== Early life and education ==
Henderson was born in Fitzgerald, Georgia, beginning his media career at eleven years old as a paperboy for the Daily Tifton Gazette. In 1964, the campaign manager for the Lyndon Johnson-Hubert Humphrey presidential election heard from a Democratic Party official about fifteen-year-old Henderson's involvement in civil rights and contacted him to arrange a meeting with Humphrey in Tifton; this led to Henderson's selection as an inaugural staffer with the federal Project Head Start, which began in 1965.

At 18, he enrolled in the Henry W. Grady College of Journalism and Mass Communication, where he wrote news releases at the university's News Bureau, the university's Office of Public Relations, and, over the summers, the Georgia Regional Hospital at Atlanta.

While an undergraduate at University of Georgia, he also attended Emory University, Atlanta, Georgia, as a grant-funded special student where he first encountered the Centers for Disease Control and Prevention (CDC) located on the Emory campus. An Emory researcher took Henderson to the CDC, where he participated in meetings concerning the center's activities.

In addition to his 1971 undergraduate BA in Journalism, Henderson holds a 2006 MFA in English (Creative and Professional Writing) from Western Connecticut State University, Danbury. He was selected for the first week-long Yale Publishing Course. He started working on a doctorate in education at the University of Sussex, and in 2014 completed his PhD in creative writing at University of Wales, Trinity Saint David, Lampeter, UK, studying under British playwright Dic Edwards.

== Early media projects ==
In 1971, Henderson launched a magazine, Real Estate Atlanta, renamed Business Atlanta. Henderson later published an urban community weekly newspaper, Buckhead Atlanta.

Henderson served as press spokesman for the Atlanta city government as director of the Community Affairs Division in the Department of Community and Human Development. Subsequently, Bert Lance, then president of The National Bank of Georgia (part of Bank of Credit and Commerce International), appointed him the bank's first director of public relations and communications. He coordinated press activities while Lance moved to President Carter's cabinet as Director of the Office of Management and Budget. Henderson left the National Bank of Georgia when Lance left the White House in 1977. He then contributed to Atlanta magazine. His bylined articles appeared on The Atlanta Journal-Constitution’s front page. In 1978, Henderson was selected “Atlantan of the Week” by the Atlanta Gazette. He moved to Washington, D.C. to be staff correspondent for Bloomberg BNA for two years, reporting for Washington Financial Reports and Daily Report for Executives.

== Motion pictures and television ==
TriStar Pictures, shortly after it was created as an independent motion picture company, hired Henderson as its National Publicist, and then as vice president of TriStar Studios. While at TriStar, he was one of three PR professionals selected in 1979 by the News Analysis Institute to receive membership in the “Over-100 Club.” Henderson was said to represent “outstanding accomplishment…and his leadership in the creation, preparation and communication of public relations news.”

Shortly before TriStar was sold to Columbia Pictures and Atlanta-based Coca-Cola in 1982, Henderson left to expand his own media company, Henderson-Crowe Communications, Inc., which founded and produced Video Concert Hall on November 1, 1979. This was the first nationwide music video television network, referred to as the precursor to MTV and VH1. Before then, it was too expensive to secure copyright privileges to air productions. Record labels featured music videos as “promotional ventures” for new albums, and Henderson secured rights to air them on national cable television. It was understood that the airing would help record companies show viewers popular records in order to increase album sales. Content on the TV network included concert footage, studio productions, and guest artists.

According to media reports, by May 1980, the show appeared on more than 400 cable TV systems in 48 states, accessing about 2.5 million homes. While with Video Concert Hall, Henderson was executive producer and writer for the nationwide broadcast TV premiere of Michael Jackson’s Thriller album's first video, Billie Jean. The company also produced the syndicated broadcast TV show Pre-Awards Special, an annual video show concerning the Grammy Awards. After the sale of Pre-Awards Special TV programming to Metromedia, the remaining assets of Video Concert Hall were sold to Georgia Public Television, including the studio equipment at Henderson-Crowe Productions in Atlanta.

== Current activities ==
In 1984, Henderson returned to news media and created a series of newsweeklies based on the CDC. NewsRx, Henderson's medical newsweekly publishing company, began with the production of AIDS Weekly in 1985. In 2008, Henderson added VerticalNews, a division of newsweeklies that covers non-health related fields. As of 2011, NewsRx publishes 194 newsweeklies on topics including education, finance, aerospace and science. Henderson is the executive editor of the aforementioned 194 newsweeklies. In 2011, Henderson started book publisher, ScholarlyMedia, and its imprint, ScholarlyEditions, which published 3,500 reference book titles in 2011.

== Controversy ==
In 1984, Henderson was co-executive producer of Halloween Thriller, taped in Hollywood and Atlanta. The TV special aired in the top 20 TV markets and much of the U.S. in October 1984, including TV stations WNEW (New York), WFLD (Chicago), KTTV (Los Angeles), WPLG (Miami), WQTV (Boston), and WXIA (Atlanta), for a total of 150 TV stations. Some disagreed with Henderson’s claim that the TV special contained no violence and no offensive clips, even though it targeted a mature, audience, specifically 18- to 49-year-olds. Henderson’s promotional literature claimed, “Elements include video music of the spirit of Halloween – no violence and no Satanic clips.” The one-hour television special was the national broadcast TV premiere of Thriller album's first video hosted by Thriller album voice, Vincent Price. The showing incorporated the “Billie Jean” cut from Thriller and an appearance by the original cast of the cult-movie classic, The Rocky Horror Picture Show, who performed the song, “Time Warp.” Ozzy Osbourne also performed “Bark at the Moon” on the national broadcast.

Henderson was criticized for starting the AIDS Weekly newsweekly because the non-governmental publication included policy, research, and statistics that some considered exclusive to the government. Also, the publishing staff included journalists rather than medical professionals. Others praised Henderson for being what the Boston Globe called a necessary “watchdog” publication providing needed information to the public. Henderson strongly opposed influence by pharmaceutical companies and stood against premature reporting of experiments.

In 2010, Henderson's NewsRx branch, VerticalNews China was the subject of a denial of service cyber attack as a result of controversial news that had been reported in the publications. The cyber attack was halted when the company's IP service identified the source and blocked it.

Henderson was press spokesman for Kalani Rosell and his family during a Hawaii school admissions policy controversy, in which Hawaii's Kamehameha Schools, founded to provide education with preference to students of native Hawaiian ancestry, admitted a non-Hawaiian student (that being Kalani Rosell) in 2002 for the first time in 40 years.
