= Gibson EDS-1275 =

Model of guitar

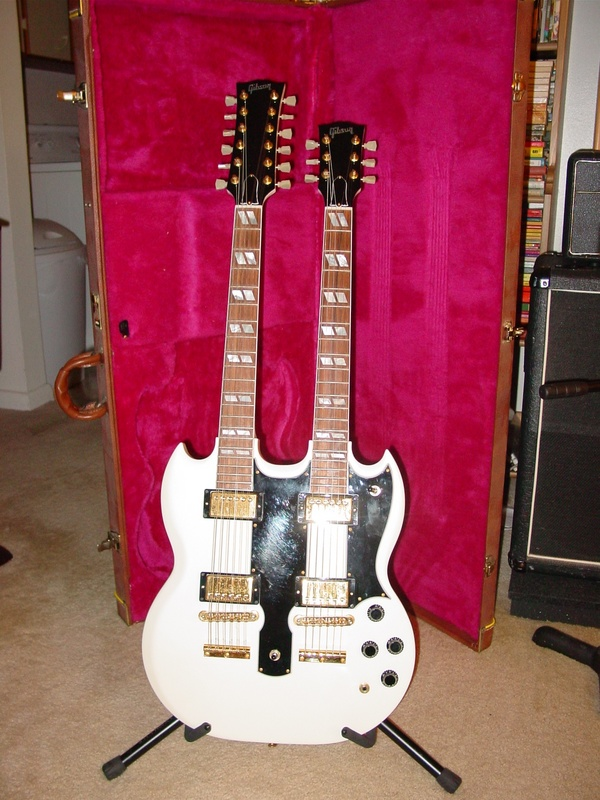
- A modern edition of the EDS-1275 in Alpine White.
- Manufacturer: Gibson
- Period: 1963–1968, 1974–1998, 1998–present

Construction
- Body type: Solid
- Neck joint: Mortise & Tenon

Woods
- Body: Mahogany
- Neck: Mahogany (pre-1998); Maple (1998-current)
- Fretboard: Rosewood

Hardware
- Bridge: ABR-1 (6-string); Tune-O-Matic (12-string); Nickel Claw Tailpieces
- Pickup(s): 490R Custom Bucker (rhythm); 498T Custom Bucker (lead)

Colors available
- Ebony, Alpine White, Heritage Cherry

The Gibson EDS-1275 is a double neck Gibson electric guitar introduced in 1958 and still in production. Popularized and raised to iconic status by musicians such as John McLaughlin, Don Felder, and Jimmy Page, it has been called "the coolest guitar in rock".

== History ==
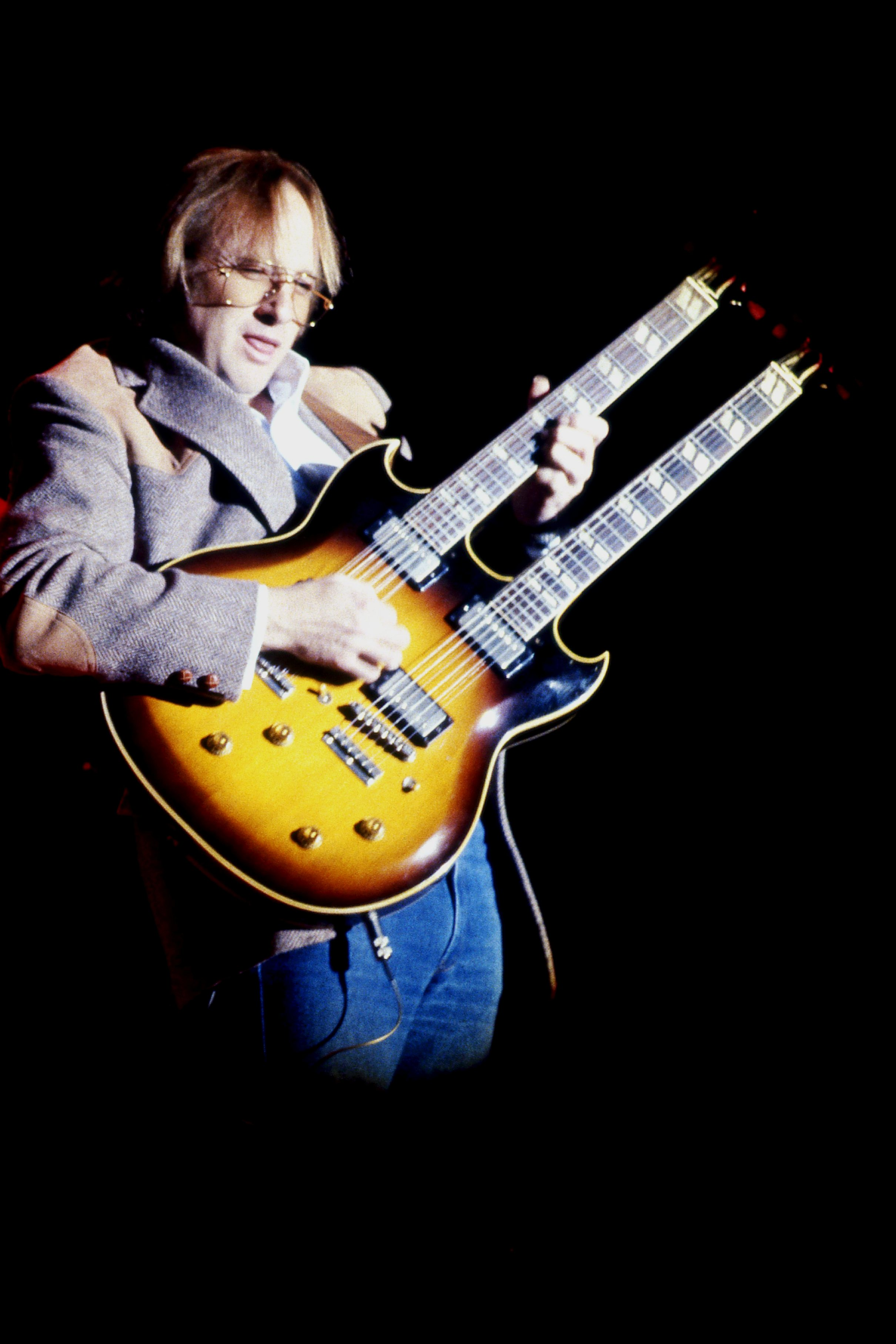
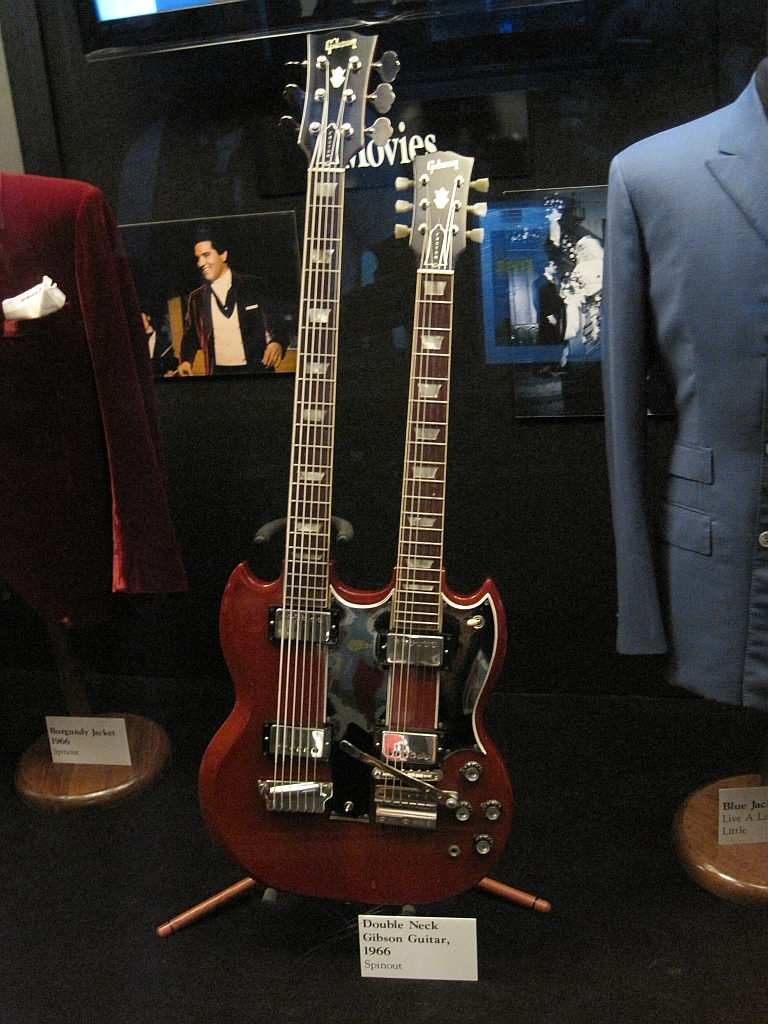
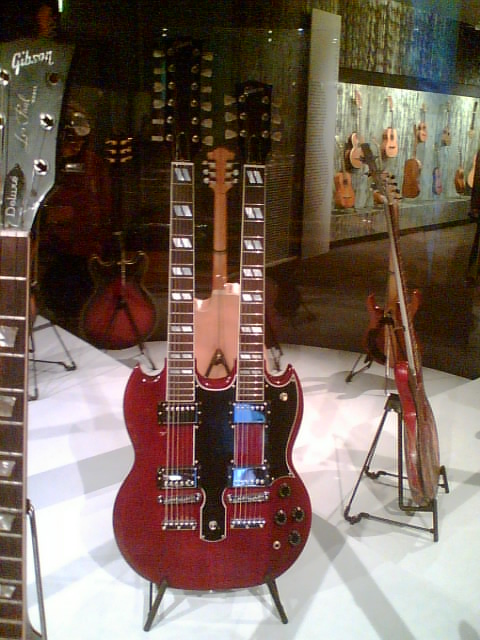
Left: Gibson Double 12 (1958-1961), played by Stephen Stills. Center: Gibson EBS-1250 (1964-1965), played by Elvis Presley. Right: Gibson EDS-1275 (1963-1968), played by Jimmy Page.

Gibson's first doubleneck guitars were produced from 1958 to 1961 with a hollow body and two 6-string necks, one being a short-scale neck tuned to a higher octave; from 1962 to 1967 it had a solid body. A model with a 4-string bass and a 6-string guitar neck was called the EBS-1250; it had a built-in fuzztone and was produced from 1962 to 1968 and again from 1977 to 1978.

In 1963, the solid-body EDS-1275 was designed, resembling the SG model; this version of the doubleneck was available until 1968. The guitar was available in jet black, cherry, sunburst, and white.

In 1974, Gibson started making the guitar again, in a number of additional colors, with production lasting until 1998. Since then, alpine white and heritage cherry versions were made by Gibson USA in Nashville, Tennessee, until 2003, in the Nashville Custom Shop from 2004 to 2005, and in the Memphis, Tennessee, Custom Shop beginning in 2006.

== Notable EDS-1275 users ==
The EDS-1275, while never selling in great quantities, was used by a number of notable musicians. Chicago bluesman Earl Hooker is seen holding one on the cover of the 1969 albums Two Bugs and a Roach and The Moon is Rising, and Elvis Presley sports a cherry doubleneck in the 1966 movie Spinout.

=== John McLaughlin ===
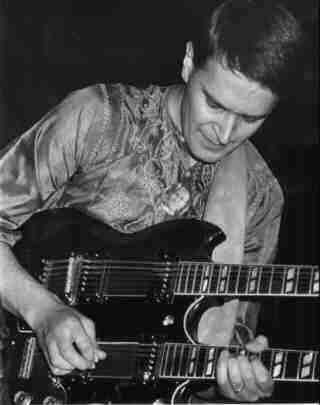
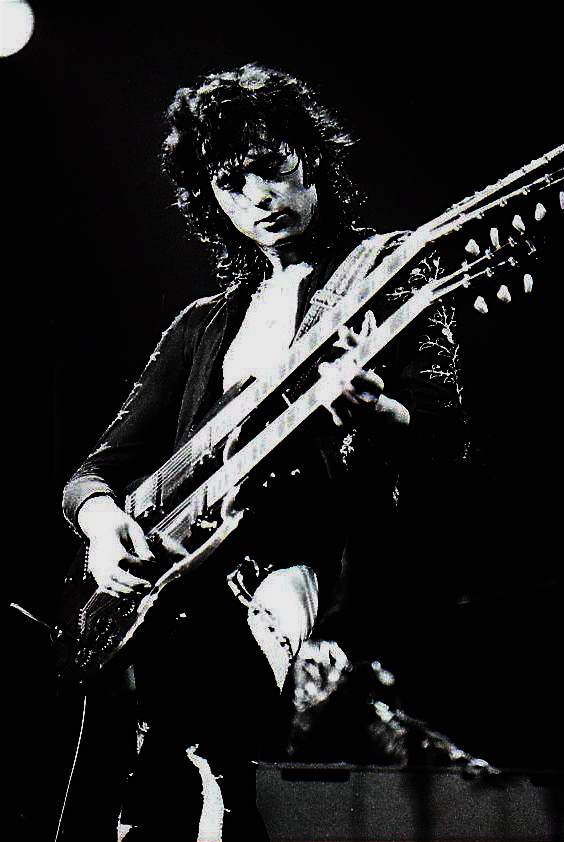
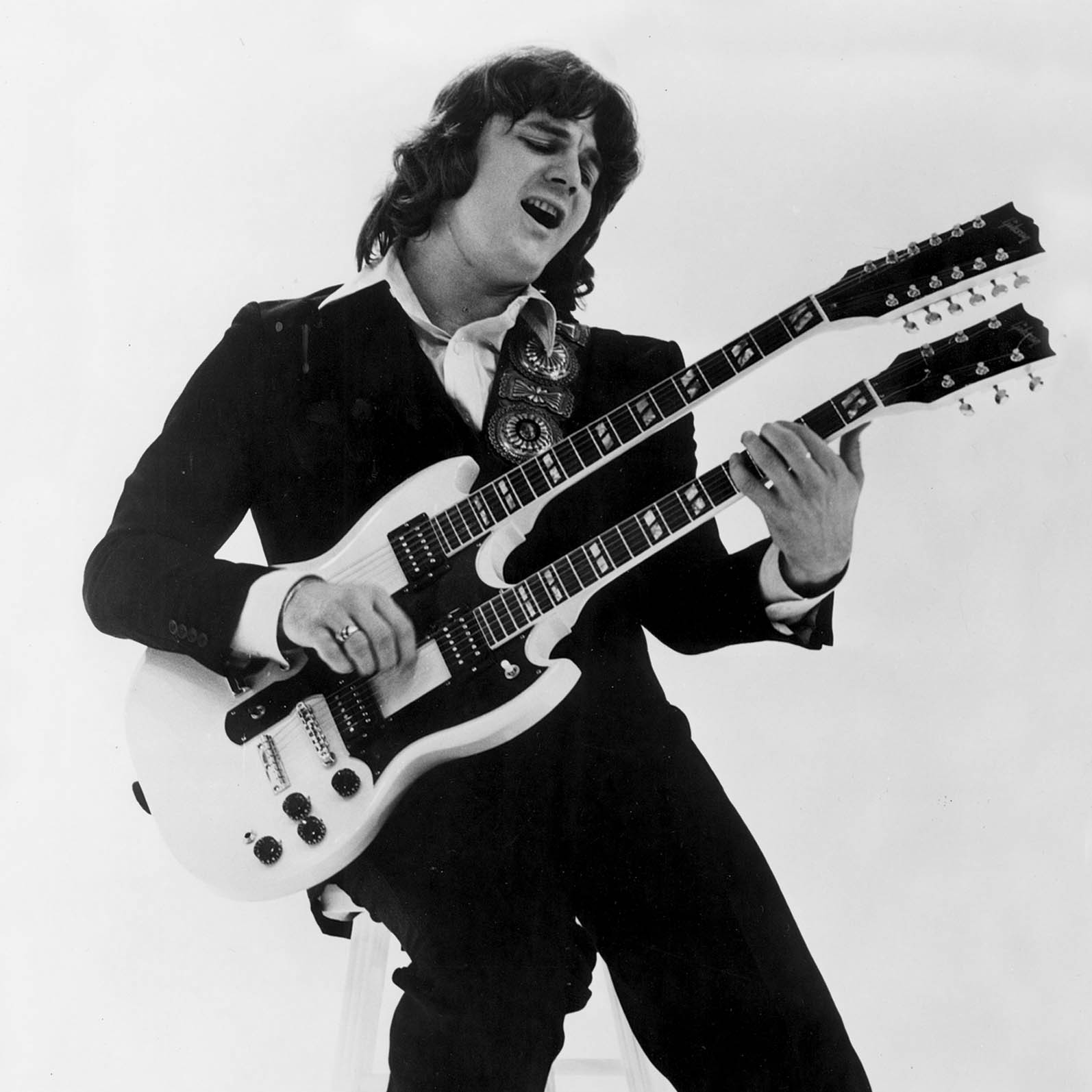
John McLaughlin, Jimmy Page and Steve Miller are three notable users of the EDS-1275

In the early 1970s, jazz-rock musician John McLaughlin played an EDS-1275 in his first years with the Mahavishnu Orchestra.

=== Charlie Whitney ===
Another guitar player who was known for playing the EDS-1275 was Charlie Whitney, the principal guitarist for the British underground band Family. Clips of Whitney performing with his EDS-1275 are readily available on YouTube from Family appearances on Beat-Club and The Old Grey Whistle Test, along with a similarly equipped (EBS-1250) John Wetton.

=== Jimmy Page ===
The EDS-1275 was popularized by Jimmy Page of Led Zeppelin, most notably during live performances of "Stairway to Heaven." The doubleneck eliminated the need to switch guitars mid-song: at the beginning of "Stairway to Heaven", he used the bottom 6-string neck for the intro and first verse, then switched to the top 12-string neck, then to the 6-string neck for the extended guitar solo, and back to the 12-string for the final chorus.

By the time Page desired an EDS-1275, they were no longer in production, so he ordered a custom-made cherry 6/12. In addition to "Stairway to Heaven", Page also used the EDS-1275 for live performances of "Celebration Day", "Tangerine", "The Song Remains the Same", "The Rain Song" and "Sick Again". In the studio, the guitar was only played on "Carouselambra", included on Led Zeppelin's album In Through the Out Door (1979).

Page's influence was such that after him other guitarists picked up the EDS-1275, including Alex Lifeson of Rush, who used it to play the song "Xanadu" live. Eddie Van Halen also had one in his collection which he used live and in the studio on the track "Secrets" from Van Halen's album Diver Down (1982). Tommy Shaw of Styx had a custom double neck which had two 12-string necks which he used on the band's live performances from 1977 to 1983.

=== Don Felder ===
Don Felder's white EDS-1275 was most famously used for playing "Hotel California" live with the Eagles and now (via Gibson Custom Shop replicas) in solo shows. It can be seen in any number of clips from the mid to late 1970s. Felder customized his EDS-1275 by removing one of the pots (bridge pickup tone control) and replacing it with a second output. This allowed for the signal to be sent to two separate amplifiers: for "Hotel California", an Echoplex and a Leslie for the swirling tones (played on the 12-string neck capo at the seven fret), and then later through his standard guitar amp (a Blackface Deluxe Reverb or Tweed Deluxe) using the six-string neck for the duet/harmony guitar solo shared with Joe Walsh. Felder's original EDS-1275 is on display at the Rock and Roll Hall of Fame in Cleveland.

== Models ==
=== Current model ===
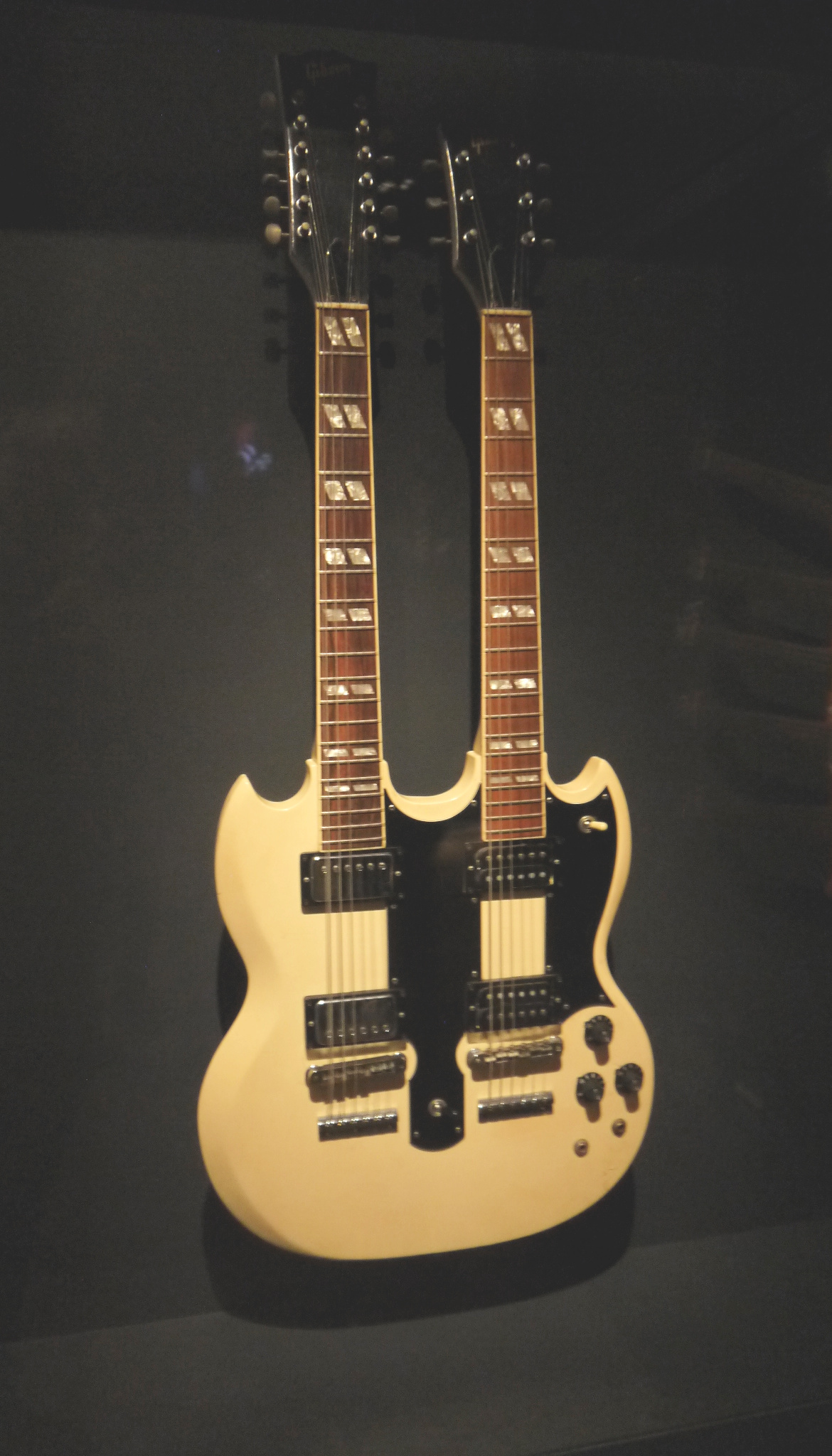
Don Felder signature model

As of 2009, the guitar is offered only through the Gibson Custom Shop as a special order model. It features two volume and two tone control knobs, a three-way pickup-selector switch, and a three-way neck-selector switch. It has vintage tulip tuners, pearloid split parallelogram inlays, black pickguards and pickup rings, twenty frets per neck (bound with single-ply white binding), and 490 Alnico (R) and 498 Alnico (T) humbucking pickups. The Custom Shop also makes a Don Felder "Hotel California" signature model. New Gibson EDS-1275 and Epiphone G-1275 models feature longer 12-string headstocks than the original EDS-1275 and the "Hotel California" EDS-1275.

=== Signature models ===
Gibson released a Jimmy Page Signature EDS-1275 model in 2007; a total of 250 were made. Page kept serial number one for himself. Serial numbers 2 through 26 of these were played and signed by Page; number 11 was donated for auction to benefit a charitable cause.

In 2019, Gibson announced a black model for Slash.

== Similar models ==
=== Epiphone ===
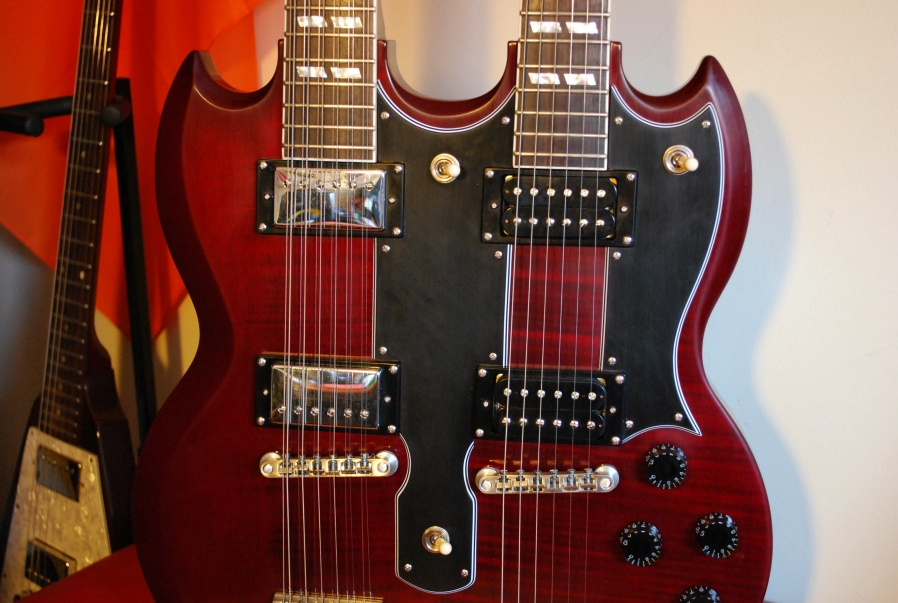
Epiphone G-1275

Epiphone, a Gibson subsidiary, makes a version of the classic doubleneck, marketing it as the G-1275.

=== Ibanez ===
Japanese guitar manufacturer Ibanez produced a model inspired by the Gibson, called the Double Axe, from 1974 to 1976. They were available as a 6/12, a 4/6, and a 6/6 configuration, in cherry and walnut finishes.

=== Harley Benton ===
German guitar manufacturer Harley Benton, which is the in-house brand for Thomann Music Store produces the 'DC-Custom 612 Cherry' doubleneck at an affordable price point. It features 6/12 configuration with 22 fret necks.
