= Carouselambra =

Song by Led Zeppelin

from the album In Through the Out Door
- Released: 15 August 1979
- Recorded: November–December 1978
- Studio: Polar Studios, Stockholm, Sweden
- Genre: Hard rock; progressive rock
- Length: 10:34
- Label: Swan Song
- Songwriters: John Paul Jones; Jimmy Page; Robert Plant
- Producer: Jimmy Page

Audio sample
- file; help

"Carouselambra" is the fifth song on Led Zeppelin's 1979 album In Through the Out Door. The title refers to the first section of the song that has similarities to carousel music. At more than 10 minutes in length, the song is the second-longest the band recorded in the studio. John Paul Jones' synthesizers dominate the song, with Jimmy Page's guitar playing a supporting role.

== Composition and recording ==
With its early working title of "The Epic", "Carouselambra" was conceived during the band's rehearsals at Clearwell Castle in May 1978. The song itself is split in three sections. The first section is a fast-paced showcase of Jones on synthesizer (he overdubbed bass guitar or already recorded it as part of the backing track), with Robert Plant's vocals mixed down slightly underneath Jones, the drums of John Bonham and Page's guitar chord progression. The second section is much slower in pace, highlighting Page's use of the Gibson EDS-1275 double-necked guitar, the only time he used that instrument on a Led Zeppelin studio song, while Plant sings some reflective lyrics. The final section returns to an up-tempo beat, with all four band members performing in unison. Page's deep, droning guitar sound was produced with a Gizmotron, a device that creates infinite sustain, unusual harmonics, and allows the guitar to sound like a string section. A Roland GR-500 guitar synthesizer was also used on this track.

== Reception ==
In a contemporary review for In Through the Out Door, Charles M. Young of Rolling Stone described "Carouselambra" as having "an extremely lame keyboard riff" and said the song was too long, clocking in at "an absurd 10:28". Young also called the song extremely repetitive, and while "repetition to weave a hypnotic effect has always been part of the Zeppelin sound, what they are repeating here is not worth the effort."

In a retrospective review of In Through the Out Door (Deluxe Edition), Andrew Doscas of PopMatters gave "Carouselambra" a negative review, calling the song something you would hear from either Styx or Genesis and not Zeppelin. Doscas found Plant "mumbling inaudible inanities for about 60% of the song." While Doscas found the song's synthesizers catchy, he found that Zeppelin fans will find it hard not to skip over "Carouselambra" after the four minute mark "in favor of the final two tracks." On the Deluxe Edition, Doscas found Plant's vocals on the "Carouselambra" rough mix (titled "The Epic") much more clear than those of the original version.

== Live renditions ==
"Carouselambra" was never played live by the band at List of Led Zeppelin concert tours. The song was reputedly discussed for inclusion in the setlist for the planned autumn 1980 tour of North America, which was ultimately canceled after Bonham's sudden death during rehearsals. During the 1995–1996 Page and Plant tour, Plant would often sing the middle verse of the song when he and Page performed "In the Evening".

== The Epic ==
A rough mix of the song with fewer overdubs was re-released in 2015 on In Through the Out Door (Deluxe Edition), with the title "The Epic".

== Personnel ==
According to Jean-Michel Guesdon and Philippe Margotin:

- Robert Plant – vocals
- Jimmy Page – electric guitars
- John Paul Jones – bass, synthesisers
- John Bonham – drums, percussion (?)

== See also ==
- List of cover versions of Led Zeppelin songs – "Carouselambra" entries

== Bibliography ==
- Guesdon, Jean-Michel; Margotin, Philippe (2018). Led Zeppelin All the Songs: The Story Behind Every Track. Running Press. ISBN 978-0-316-448-67-3.
