= ScholarlyEditions =

Publishing imprint

- Parent company: ScholarlyMedia, LLC
- Founded: 2011; 14 years ago
- Founder: CW Henderson
- Country of origin: United States
- Headquarters location: Atlanta, Georgia
- Distribution: Global
- Imprints: ScholarlyEditions; ScholarlyBriefs; ScholarlyPapers
- Official website: www.scholarlyeditions.com

ScholarlyEditions is a publishing imprint of ScholarlyMedia, LLC. The imprint publishes full-length eBooks in ePUB and PDF formats containing material from the over four million article summaries in the ScholarlyNews database of its partner, NewsRx, LLC.

Chapters in ScholarlyEditions eBooks contain full source contact information, full journal citations, keywords, MeSH codes, and quotations from the authors of the original peer-reviewed research.

ScholarlyEditions also produces ScholarlyBriefs and ScholarlyPapers, shorter research publications. Each publication is updated annually.

== ScholarlyEditions eBooks ==
In 2011, ScholarlyEditions published 3,429 eBooks. The eBook content consists of summaries of science research articles. ScholarlyEditions eBooks are available digitally through eBook aggregators and content providers such as Gale and ProQuest's ebrary.

The eBooks cover three primary topic groups: Healthcare, Advances, and Issues. The Healthcare category of eBooks included 1,029 eBooks in 2011. The 2,135 Advances titles published in 2011 cover emerging technologies and studies in all fields. The 265 Issues titles report on a variety of controversial concerns.
