= Fool in the Rain =

- Japanese single picture sleeve

Single by Led Zeppelin

from the album In Through the Out Door
- B-side: "Hot Dog"
- Released: 7 December 1979 (US)
- Recorded: November–December 1978
- Studio: Polar, Stockholm, Sweden
- Genre: Rock; samba
- Length: 6:08
- Label: Swan Song
- Songwriters: John Paul Jones; Jimmy Page; Robert Plant
- Producer: Jimmy Page

Led Zeppelin singles chronology
"Candy Store Rock" (1976)	"Fool in the Rain" (1979)

"Fool in the Rain" is the third song on Led Zeppelin's 1979 album In Through the Out Door. It was the last single released in the US before Led Zeppelin formally disbanded in 1980. The song peaked at number 1 in Canadian CHUM Chart on 19 January 1980 and reached number 21 on the Billboard Hot 100 on 16 February of the same year.

== Composition ==
Led Zeppelin bassist John Paul Jones and vocalist Robert Plant were inspired by samba beats that played during the 1978 FIFA World Cup tournament in Argentina. Biographer Dave Lewis commented:

Thus the idea emerged to layer on their own samba halfway through the hop-skip riff arrangement. Crazed as it sounds, it works beautifully right through JP's [Jones] street whistles to Bonzo's [drummer Bonham] delightfully constructed timpani crashes.

== Critical reception ==
While In Through The Out Door was not regarded with the same praise as Led Zeppelin's previous albums, "Fool in the Rain" still received a positive reception. Scott Ludwig, writing for Courier News in 1980, highly praised Bonham's performance. In a retrospective review, Andrew Doscas of PopMatters called it the "standout track", opining it was "the band’s last fun song" and "the only such found on In Through the Out Door". Cash Box said it has "a zesty Latin-samba instrumental break, Page's sharp lead and rhythm guitar work and Plant’s high, tough vocals."

== Performances ==
"Fool in the Rain" was never performed live by Led Zeppelin. However, band member Robert Plant teamed up with American rock band Pearl Jam in 2005 and performed the song live for the Hurricane Katrina benefit in Chicago's House of Blues. Pearl Jam originally did not plan it, but changed their itinerary after Hurricane Katrina went through New Orleans. All proceeds of the performance went to charities.

== Personnel ==
According to Jean-Michel Guesdon and Philippe Margotin:

- Robert Plant – vocals
- Jimmy Page – electric guitars, acoustic guitars (six- and twelve-string)
- John Paul Jones – bass, piano, synthesiser (?)
- John Bonham – drums, timbales, agogo, marimba (?)
- Unidentified musicians: maracas, shaker, guiro, whistle

== Chart history ==
1979-80 singles charts
Chart	Peak	Ref(s)
U.S. Billboard Hot 100	21	
U.S. Cash Box Top 100 Singles	31	
U.S. Record World The Singles Chart	34	
Canada CHUM Chart Hit Parade	1	
Canada RPM Top 100 Chart	12	

2007 digital charts
Chart	Peak	Ref(s)
Canada Billboard Hot Digital Singles Chart	69	

== See also ==
- List of cover versions of Led Zeppelin songs § Fool in the Rain

== Bibliography ==
- Guesdon, Jean-Michel; Margotin, Philippe (2018). Led Zeppelin All the Songs: The Story Behind Every Track. Running Press. ISBN 978-0-316-448-67-3.
