= In the Evening =

Song by Led Zeppelin

from the album In Through the Out Door
- Released: 15 August 1979
- Recorded: November–December 1978
- Studio: Polar, Stockholm, Sweden
- Genre: Hard rock; progressive rock
- Length: 6:48
- Label: Swan Song
- Songwriter(s): John Paul Jones; Jimmy Page; Robert Plant
- Producer(s): Jimmy Page

"In the Evening" is the first song on Led Zeppelin's 1979 album In Through the Out Door. Guitarist Jimmy Page uses a Gizmotron to create the droning effects and sliding solo at the beginning of the song.

== Live performances ==
The song was performed at Led Zeppelin concerts during 1979 and 1980. During the 1979 performances, it was played directly after Page's guitar distortion and violin bow solo, which incorporated a laser strobe to add to the visual effects. One such live version, from Led Zeppelin's performance at Knebworth in 1979, can be seen on the Led Zeppelin DVD. Performances on the Tour Over Europe 1980 sometimes lasted more than eight minutes.

Plant revived "In the Evening" on his Now and Zen solo tour in 1988. Page and Plant performed the song in some concerts in 1995 and 1996 on the accompanying tour for their 1994 live album No Quarter: Jimmy Page and Robert Plant Unledded.

== Reception ==
In a contemporary review for In Through the Out Door, Charles M. Young of Rolling Stone called "In the Evening" the album's best track, describing the song as "a classic Zeppelin orchestral guitar rumble halfway between 'When the Levee Breaks' and 'In the Light' ... [it] has the only great guitar riff on the entire album." He also described the vocals as barely understandable.

In a retrospective review of In Through the Out Door (Deluxe Edition), Andrew Doscas of PopMatters believed "In the Evening" to be "a phoned-in effort, actually sounding more like Led Zeppelin phoning in a phoned-in attempt at a pop song." Doscas also found Plant's vocals on the song barely understandable.

== Personnel ==
According to Jean-Michel Guesdon and Philippe Margotin:

- Robert Plant – vocals
- Jimmy Page – electric guitars, bow (?)
- John Paul Jones – bass, keyboard
- John Bonham – drums, timpani

== See also ==
- List of cover versions of Led Zeppelin songs – "In the Evening" entries

== Bibliography ==
- Guesdon, Jean-Michel; Margotin, Philippe (2018). Led Zeppelin All the Songs: The Story Behind Every Track. Running Press. ISBN 978-0-316-448-67-3.
