= In Through the Out Door =

- One of six picture sleeve variants for original 1979 vinyl release, also used for digital, 2010's vinyl re-releases, and 2015 reissue. Cover by Hipgnosis

Studio album by Led Zeppelin
- Released: 22 August 1979
- Recorded: November–December 1978
- Studios: Polar, Stockholm, Sweden
- Genres: Hard rock; art rock
- Length: 42:35
- Label: Swan Song
- Producer: Jimmy Page

Led Zeppelin chronology
The Song Remains the Same (1976)	In Through the Out Door (1979)	Coda (1982)

Led Zeppelin studio chronology
Presence (1976)	In Through the Out Door (1979)	Coda (1982)

Singles from In Through the Out Door
- 1. "Fool in the Rain"/"Hot Dog" Released: 7 December 1979

Original paper bag sleeve
- One of the paper bag sleeve variants for original vinyl release. The stamped logo was used on the front cover for original tape releases and 2015 reissue.

In Through the Out Door is the eighth studio album by the English rock band Led Zeppelin. It was recorded in three weeks in November and December 1978 at ABBA's Polar Studios in Stockholm, Sweden, and released by Led Zeppelin's label Swan Song Records on 22 August 1979 in the US and 24 August 1979 in the UK.

Unlike earlier Led Zeppelin albums, In Through the Out Door was predominantly composed by John Paul Jones and Robert Plant, because Jimmy Page and John Bonham were frequently absent from its sessions due to their respective heroin and alcohol abuse. It was the band's last release before the death of Bonham in September 1980, three months after which the remaining members disbanded.

The album was a commercial success: it went to No. 1 on the Billboard 200 in its second week on the American chart; and it also went to No. 1 in the UK, Canada, and New Zealand.

== Background ==
The album was named by the group to describe its struggles after the death of Robert Plant's son Karac in 1977, and after the group's tax exile from the UK, during which they were unable to tour Britain for more than two years, after which they described their attempt to recapture the British public's attention as being as difficult as "trying to get in through the 'out' door."

The group began rehearsing material in September 1978. After six weeks, they travelled to Polar Studios in Stockholm to begin recording. In contrast to previous Led Zeppelin albums, In Through the Out Door features much greater influence from bassist and keyboardist John Paul Jones and vocalist Robert Plant, and less influence from guitarist Jimmy Page and drummer John Bonham, both of whom failed to attend rehearsals as a consequence of their respective heroin and alcohol abuse. Jones later said, "there were two distinct camps by then, and we [Plant and I] were in the relatively clean one." Many of the songs were consequently arranged by Jones and Plant before Page and Bonham joined their rehearsals at night. Jones was inspired by the Yamaha GX-1 synthesiser that he had recently purchased, and he was "working closely with Robert, which was something that had not happened before." Page maintained that they recorded in the studio as a full band, like on their previous albums, rather than separately.

After the recording sessions at Polar, the album was mixed at Page's personal studio at his home in Plumpton. "Wearing and Tearing", "Ozone Baby" and "Darlene" (which was a boogie-woogie influenced song that credited to all four members) were recorded during sessions for this album, but were omitted from the release because of time constraints and were released only later on the album Coda.

== Songs ==
For In Through the Out Door, John Paul Jones is a co-writer on six of the seven songs, more than on any other Led Zeppelin album. The album's "South Bound Saurez" and "All My Love" are the only two original Led Zeppelin songs to the composition of which Page did not contribute. In Through the Out Door is also their only studio album to the composition of which Bonham did not contribute.

After the guitar-heavy Presence, Page intended to write uncharacteristic guitar parts for In Through the Out Door, such as the solos on "In the Evening" and "Fool in the Rain". He said that "The thing with In Through the Out Door is that there's nothing like an 'Achilles...' or a 'Kashmir' on there."

=== Side one ===
"In the Evening" was planned as the opening track for the album as "a full-blown epic", in order to show that Led Zeppelin could still make good heavy rock music. In an interview, Page explained that he used a violin bow and a Gizmotron effect on his guitar to create the droning sound in the opening section of the song. The track features a contrast between the powerful riffs in the main part of the track, against its relatively quiet middle section.

"South Bound Saurez" starts with a "rollicking piano intro" played by Jones; author Dave Lewis calls it a "track that conjures up the New Orleans bar room feel of the sleeve." It is credited to Jones and Plant, and is one of only three officially released original Led Zeppelin songs to the composition of which Page did not contribute. The other two are "All My Love", from the same album, that is credited to only Jones and Plant, and "Bonzo's Montreux" from Coda, that is credited only to John Bonham.

"Fool in the Rain" was an attempt to combine a samba rhythm with a basic rock tune, resulting in a polyrhythm partway through the song. The idea was inspired by Plant explaining that the group must explore new musical territory in order to remain current. The basic drum pattern is a Purdie shuffle played by Bonham.

"Hot Dog" grew out of the band's pre-production rehearsals, where they warmed up by playing a series of old Elvis Presley and Ricky Nelson covers. Dave Lewis calls it a "rockabilly country hoe-down" that "owes much to the state of Texas and to the state of a particular female in Texas."

=== Side two ===
"Carouselambra," more than 10 minutes long, is dominated by Jones' keyboards and covers a variety of musical styles. Page played his Gibson EDS-1275 double neck guitar, which was normally only used for live performances. The group had intended to play the song live for a planned North American tour, which was cancelled after Bonham's death.

"All My Love" is an unconventional love song composed by Plant and Jones when they were the first to arrive at the studio. It was written in honour of Plant's son Karac, who died while Led Zeppelin were on their 1977 North American Tour. Jones played a classically inspired synthesiser solo in the middle of the track.

"I'm Gonna Crawl" is a relaxed blues track. Plant arranged the track to be in the style of mid-1960s soul music such as that of Wilson Pickett and Otis Redding. Jones contributed a string synthesiser arrangement.

== Packaging and artwork ==
The original album featured an unusual gimmick: The outer sleeve was made to look like a plain brown paper bag, reminiscent of similarly packaged bootleg album sleeves with the title rubber-stamped on it, and the inner sleeve featured black and white line artwork which when wiped with a wet rag or sponge would activate an invisible ink and become permanently colored. There were also six different cover sleeve variants (A - F), featuring a different pair of photos for the front and back, and the external brown paper sleeve meant that it was impossible for record buyers to tell which sleeve they were getting. The corresponding letter was printed on the spine to indicate which cover variant it was, and this was sometimes exposed while the record was still sealed. The pictures all depict the same scene of a man sitting at a bar burning a Dear John letter along with six onlookers including the bartender, a piano player, a man holding his coat and three female patrons, all taken from a different point of view with slightly different poses. The photo session was taken in a London studio and was meant to re-create the Old Absinthe House in New Orleans, Louisiana.

The album artwork was designed by Hipgnosis' Storm Thorgerson. In 1980, Hipgnosis was nominated for a Grammy Award in the category of Best Album Package for In Through the Out Door.

== Release and promotion ==
The album was intended to be released before the band's twin concerts at Knebworth in 1979, but production delays meant that it was released shortly after their performances at this event, on 4 and 11 August 1979. Plant jokingly referred to the delays at times during the performance on 4 August 1979.

The album reached No. 1 on the Billboard 200 in its second week on the album chart, reportedly selling 1.7 million copies within weeks of release. Subsequently, Led Zeppelin's entire catalogue appeared in the Billboard 200 between the weeks of 23 October and 3 November 1979, an unprecedented feat, topping their own record in 1975, when all their albums up to Physical Graffiti were on the chart. The album remained on the US top spot for seven weeks and sold three million copies by the end of September 1979. It was credited with helping to revive the US record industry, which had begun to struggle. In January 1980, "Fool in the Rain" was released as a single to further promote the album, but it narrowly missed the top 20 of the singles chart. It was the band's final studio release to reach the top of the charts in the United States.

In Through the Out Door is the Led Zeppelin album that has spent the most weeks on the top of the charts (tied with Led Zeppelin II). To date, the album has sold six million copies in the US.

== Critical reception ==
Professional ratings
Review scores
Source	Rating
AllMusic	3.5/5 stars
The Daily Telegraph	1/5 stars
The Encyclopedia of Popular Music	3/5 stars
MusicHound Rock	4/5 stars
The Rolling Stone Album Guide	3/5 stars
Smash Hits	7/10
Tom Hull – on the Web	B+
The Village Voice	B+

In Through the Out Door divided contemporary critics and Led Zeppelin fans; some found its synthesiser-influenced music forward-thinking while others felt the band had forsaken their heavy, fast sound. According to Jimmy Page biographer Martin Power, "predictably, in the wake of punk, In Through the Out Door received a rough ride from some critics, with Zep's veteran status in the music business now used as a stick with which to beat them."

Reviewing the album in Rolling Stone, Charles M. Young said Page's diminishing creativity resulted in little good material to work with for Plant, whose lyrics Young found inane, and Bonham, whose drumming was viewed as heavy handed. This brought to the forefront the keyboard playing of Jones, who Young said "functions best behind Page, not in front of him". Chris Bohn from Melody Maker said "the impressionable first play" of the record "had everyone in the office rolling around laughing", while accusing the band of being "totally out of touch" and "displaying the first intimations of mortality". By contrast, NME journalist Nick Kent argued that the album was "no epitaph", believing its "potential points of departure" deserved further listening. Robert Christgau also wrote positively of the record in The Village Voice, observing the usual "lax in the lyrics department", but regarding the album as the group's best since Houses of the Holy (1973). He said "the tuneful synthesizer pomp on side two confirms my long-held belief that this is a real good art-rock band", while "the lollapalooza hooks on the first side confirms the world's long-held belief that this is a real good hard rock band". At the end of the year, In Through the Out Door was nominated for the 1980 American Music Awards, in the category of "Favorite Pop/Rock Album".

Following the album's release, Plant, Page and Bonham all expressed reservations about the record. Plant later said that he enjoyed the variation in styles from previous albums, though he appreciated the album was "a bit sanitised". Page said in 2004, "we wanted, after In Through the Out Door, to make something hard-hitting and riff-based again. Of course, we never got to make that album." He is also quoted as saying, "It wasn't the most comfortable album. I think it was very transitional ... a springboard for what could have been." In Through the Out Door was Led Zeppelin's final album to be released while all the original members were still alive; drummer John Bonham died on 25 September 1980.

In The Rolling Stone Album Guide (2004), Gaylord Fields said the album was "maligned upon its release a retreat from heaviness" but "now stands as an art-rock oddity with some alluring tangents". Colin Larkin appraised it in his Encyclopedia of Popular Music (2006) as "lacking the definition" of the band's previous records, yet "a strong collection on which John Paul Jones emerged as the unifying factor". Neil McCormick, however, reinforced past complaints about the album, ranking it as the band's worst album in a 2014 retrospective on the band in The Daily Telegraph: "Muddy production, perky synths, jaunty pop rhythms and an orchestral ballad make these songs barely recognisable as the heaviest band in history." Rock critic Chuck Eddy highlighted the band's open-minded absorption of new wave and disco and particularly praised side one "where they don't take themselves so seriously", with its barrelhouse, bluegrass and Dr. Buzzard-style conga line excursions. He deemed the "sophisticated blues-symphonies" on side two more troublesome but praised the "Enodisco" synth at the end of "Carouselambra".

== 2015 reissue ==
2015 reissue ratings
Aggregate scores
Source	Rating
Metacritic	73/100
Review scores
Source	Rating
Classic Rock	7/10
Pitchfork	8.0/10
PopMatters	5/10
Q	4/5 stars
Uncut	8/10

A remastered version of In Through the Out Door, along with Presence and Coda were reissued on 31 July 2015. The reissue comes in six formats: a standard CD edition, a deluxe two-CD edition, a standard LP version, a deluxe two-LP version, a super deluxe two-CD plus two-LP version with a hardback book, and as high resolution 24-bit/96k digital downloads. The deluxe and super deluxe editions feature bonus material containing alternative takes and alternatively titled tracks, "Southbound Piano", "The Epic", "The Hook", and "Blot". The reissue was released with a black and white version of the original album's artwork as its bonus disc's cover. A replica of the brown bag and the colourable line drawing are included in this edition.

The reissue was met with generally positive reviews. At Metacritic, which assigns a normalised rating out of 100 to reviews from mainstream publications, the album received an average score of 73, based on eight reviews. Q magazine said "it's aged remarkably well and 'All My Love' is breathtakingly beautiful", while Tim Batcup from Classic Rock observed in the bonus material "a scruffier, rambunctious 'Hot Dog' and a sparser 'In the Evening', the drone intro truncated and Jones's synths high in the mix". PopMatters reviewer Andrew Doscas was more critical, especially of the bonus disc: "While In Through the Out Door does have some merit, it's cruel of Led Zeppelin to think that anyone, even a dedicated fan, could muster the strength to listen to the album twice in a row."

== Track listing ==
=== Original release ===
The details are taken from the original US Swan Song album (UK edition does not list running times). All tracks written by John Paul Jones, Jimmy Page, and Robert Plant, except where noted. John Bonham received no writing credits on the album.

Side one
No.	Title	Writer(s)	Length
1.	"In the Evening"		6:48
2.	"South Bound Saurez"	Jones; Plant	4:11
3.	"Fool in the Rain"		6:08
4.	"Hot Dog"	Page; Plant	3:15

Side two
No.	Title	Writer(s)	Length
1.	"Carouselambra"		10:28
2.	"All My Love"	Jones; Plant	5:51
3.	"I'm Gonna Crawl"		5:28
Total length:			42:35

=== Deluxe edition (2015) ===
2015 deluxe edition bonus disc
No.	Title	Writer(s)	Length
1.	"In the Evening" (Rough mix)		6:53
2.	"Southbound Piano" ("South Bound Saurez", Rough mix)	Jones; Plant	4:15
3.	"Fool in the Rain" (Rough mix)		6:08
4.	"Hot Dog" (Rough mix)	Page; Plant	3:16
5.	"The Epic" ("Carouselambra", Rough mix)		10:48
6.	"The Hook" ("All My Love", Rough mix)	Jones; Plant	5:51
7.	"Blot" ("I'm Gonna Crawl", Rough mix)		5:33
Total length:			42:54

== Personnel ==
- Robert Plant – vocals
- Jimmy Page – guitars, Gizmotron, production
- John Paul Jones – bass guitar, keyboards
- John Bonham – drums, percussion

Production

- John Davis – remastering (2015 reissues)
- Barry Diament – mastering (original 1988 Compact Disc release)
- Peter Grant – executive producer
- Hipgnosis – record sleeve
- George Marino – remastering (1994 reissues)
- Leif Mases – engineering
- Jeff Ocheltree – drum tech for John Bonham
- Lennart Östlund – assistant engineering

== Charts ==
=== Weekly charts ===
Weekly chart performance for In Through the Out Door
Chart (1979–1980)	Peak position
Australian Albums (Kent Music Report)	3
Austrian Albums (Ö3 Austria)	15
Canada Top Albums/CDs (RPM)	1
Dutch Albums (Album Top 100)	20
Finnish Albums (The Official Finnish Charts)	10
German Albums (Offizielle Top 100)	9
Italian Albums (Musica e Dischi)	12
Japanese Albums (Oricon)	2
New Zealand Albums (RMNZ)	1
Norwegian Albums (VG-lista)	14
Spanish Albums Chart	5
Swedish Albums (Sverigetopplistan)	6
UK Albums (Official Charts)	1
US Billboard 200	1

Weekly chart performance for In Through the Out Door reissue
Chart (2015)	Peak position
Australian Albums (ARIA)	25
Belgian Albums (Ultratop Flanders)	25
Belgian Albums (Ultratop Wallonia)	13
Finnish Albums (Suomen virallinen lista)	10
French Albums (SNEP)	43
Hungarian Albums (MAHASZ)	6
Italian Albums (FIMI)	26
Portuguese Albums (AFP)	25
Scottish Albums (Official Charts)	10
Spanish Albums (Promusicae)	31
Swiss Albums (Schweizer Hitparade)	17
UK Rock & Metal Albums (Official Charts)	3

=== Year-end charts ===
Year-end chart performance for In Through the Out Door
Chart (1979)	Position
Canada Top Albums/CDs (RPM)	17
New Zealand Albums (RMNZ)	16
US Billboard 200	26
Chart (1980)	Position
Canada Top Albums/CDs (RPM)	13
US Billboard 200	9

== Certifications ==
Certifications for In Through the Out Door
Region	Certification	Certified units/sales
Argentina (CAPIF)	Gold	30,000^{^}
Australia (ARIA)	2× Platinum	140,000^{^}
Hungary (MAHASZ) 2015 Deluxe edition	Gold	1,000^{^}
New Zealand (RMNZ)	2× Platinum	30,000^{^}
United Kingdom (BPI)	Platinum	300,000^{^}
United States (RIAA)	6× Platinum	6,000,000^{^}
^{^} Shipments figures based on certification alone.
