= NewsRx =

American media and technology company

- Founded: 1984
- Founder: CW Henderson
- Country of origin: United States
- Headquarters location: Atlanta, State of Georgia, United States
- Distribution: Global
- Imprints: BUTTER, NewsRx, VerticalNews
- Official website: www.newsrx.com

NewsRx is an American media company that publishes both digital and print media. As a news service, it specializes in health, medical, and biomedical topics, with coverage of business-related news and emerging research trends.

== Overview ==
The company was founded by Charles W. Henderson in 1984, with its first publication, AIDS Weekly. It publishes specialized newsweeklies in health and other sectors. Historically, NewsRx distributed its content through LexisNexis, Factiva, The Wall Street Journal Professional Edition, Thomson Reuters, ProQuest, and Cengage Learning. In the early 2000s, the company introduced the imprint Vertical News for newsweeklies outside the health sector. NewsRx also publishes reference books through ScholarlyEditions and operates the BUTTER platform, a tool for delivering its content to academic and professional users.

== History ==
NewsRx was founded as an informational publication about AIDS that was published under media executive CW Henderson's name for two decades. It re-branded as NewsRx in 2004 to reflect its expanded scope beyond health publishing.

In 1984, the company distributed its first journal, CDC AIDS Weekly (which later split into AIDS Weekly and Medical Letter on the CDC & FDA), to an international audience. The first subscribers included the Soviet Union, physicians, educators, government agencies, and pharmaceutical companies.

Articles in AIDS Weekly addressed both medical research findings and the social dimensions of the AIDS epidemic. The newsweekly included “shorts” to explain or report on unfolding information and events.

Before the World Wide Web, NewsRx coordinated with the National AIDS Information Clearinghouse to provide information on the disease. The CDC AIDS Weekly Info Line provided a list of upcoming AIDS seminars as well as names and addresses of over 65 AIDS periodicals published worldwide.

The information was published in AIDS Weekly came primarily from the CDC. Other sources of information were the nearby Emory University medical library and international agencies. Articles included summaries of peer-reviewed research, conference reports, news releases, and compilations from other health and medical organisations.

NewsRx faced criticism for republishing publicly available government statistics as proprietary commercial products, leading to scrutiny from Newsweek magazine and some CDC officials.

In 1988, NewsRx added Cancer Weekly, in 1993, Blood Weekly, and in 1995, Vaccine Weekly. The company subsequently launched over 100 additional medical-related titles.

By 1995, the company was producing health-focused newsweeklies on a large scale.

In 1999, NewsRx introduced the Artificial Intelligence Journalist (AIJ) system, which employed automated reasoning and machine learning techniques to assist with reporting. This system was designed to accelerate content production.

In 2007, the firm introduced VerticalNews.

And in 2010, the firm's VerticalNews China was the subject of a denial of service attack that originated from China as a result of a controversial news report. The attack was halted when the company's IP service identified the source and blocked it.

== Activities and partnerships ==
From 2015, NewsRx operated the business intelligence service Better Understanding Through Technology & Emerging Research (BUTTER), a searchable database that aggregated research using a proprietary New Discovery Index (NDI) to identify and characterize new research papers. The platform offered content to researchers, academics, and investors.

As of March 2016, the BUTTER platform had published over 11.4 million articles. It compiled data on market movements, regulatory filings, and intellectual-property updates. BUTTER ceased operations in 2024, with the platform no longer actively publishing new content or accepting new subscriber registrations.

NewsRx has partnered with other companies, including Factiva and The Wall Street Journal Professional Edition; InfoDesk, Reuters and subsequently Thomson Reuters, Cambridge Information Group (ProQuest), NewsEdge, and Cengage Learning (Gale).

NewsRx also publishes article summaries with its partner ScholarlyMedia, forming the company's imprint ScholarlyEditions and its peer-reviewed news service ScholarlyNews. As a result of the partnership, the president of NewsRx is also the president of ScholarlyMedia.

== Controversies ==
NewsRx is staffed by journalists rather than medical professionals. At the company's beginnings, Newsweek magazine commented that AIDS Weekly, as a non-government entity, should not be reporting on topics that included policy, research, and statistics that Newsweek considered exclusive to the government. The head of the Centers for Disease Control and Prevention (CDC) AIDS task force at the time disputed being quoted as opposing the CDC's association with the newsweekly, claiming the statement was taken out of context. Every issue of the CDC AIDS Weekly included an advisory caption, “… not sponsored by, endorsed by, affiliated with, or officially connected with the CDC.” Other staffers within the CDC supported NewsRx's views on bringing AIDS awareness to the public eye. The Wall Street Journal, The New York Times, and USA Today published articles in support of NewsRx's impact on AIDS awareness and investigative journalism.

C.W. Henderson's role as executive editor at the firm was discussed in an article in Editor & Publisher focusing on the influence of pharmaceutical companies on news publications. Henderson opposed the influence of pharmaceutical companies on reporters and the premature reporting on experiments.

The firm was also involved in a controversy with The New York Times focused on AIDS studies that had purposely been tampered with at the CDC. According to internal CDC memoranda published by NewsRx, research integrity was compromised in at least five instances, prompting investigation into potential tampering with AIDS and viral disease studies. CDC AIDS Weekly published an internal CDC memorandum on the incident.
