= List of cover versions of Led Zeppelin songs =

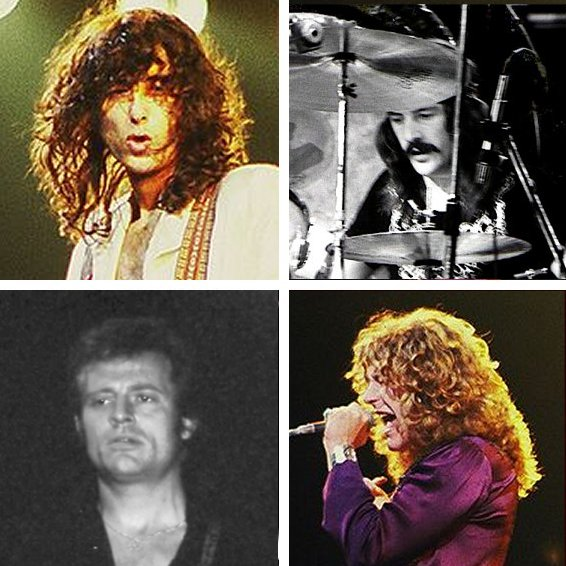
Led Zeppelin. Clockwise, from top left: Jimmy Page, John Bonham, Robert Plant, John Paul Jones

Led Zeppelin were an English rock band which played from 1968 to 1980. They are considered one of the most successful, innovative, and influential rock groups in history. During the band's tenure and in the years since they disbanded, many artists have recorded and released cover versions of their songs. These include complete tribute albums, live versions, as well as versions on studio albums. Led Zeppelin has also garnered tribute acts, such as Dread Zeppelin, who performs their songs in a reggae style as sung by an obese Elvis impersonator, and the all-female Zepparella.

This list catalogues songs credited to Led Zeppelin or the individual group members (Jimmy Page, Robert Plant, John Paul Jones, and John Bonham) that have been subsequently recorded or sampled by other artists. Only officially released recordings by notable artists are included – the list does not include bootleg or unrecorded live performances, or any unreleased demo recordings. Additionally, it does not include songs recorded or performed by Led Zeppelin that are officially credited (fully or partially) to other songwriters.

== List ==
Name of song, artist(s), album, year of release, and additional notes.
Song	Artist(s)	Release	Year	Note(s)	Ref(s)
"Achilles Last Stand"	Dream Theater	A Change of Seasons EP	1995	Medley	
"Achilles Last Stand"	Jason Bonham Band	In the Name of My Father – The Zepset – Live from Electric Ladyland	1997	Encore medley with "Whole Lotta Love"	
"Achilles Last Stand"	Vitamin String Quartet	The String Quartet Tribute to Led Zeppelin	2006	Bonus DVD edition	
"All My Love"	Dread Zeppelin	Hot & Spicy Beanburger	1993	titled "All of My Love"	
"All My Love"	Michael White & the White	Plays the Best of Led Zeppelin	1995		
"All My Love"	The London Philharmonic Orchestra with Peter Scholes	Kashmir: Symphonic Led Zeppelin	1997		
"All My Love"	Great White	Great Zeppelin: A Tribute to Led Zeppelin	1999		
"All My Love"	Ween	Live in Chicago	2004	DVD exclusive track, titled "All of My Love"	
"All My Love"	Vanilla Fudge	Out Through the In Door	2007	titled "All of My Love"	
"All My Love"	Billy Sherwood	Led Box: The Ultimate Led Zeppelin Tribute	2008		
"All My Love"	Bettye LaVette	Interpretations: The British Rock Songbook	2010		
"The Battle of Evermore"	The Lovemongers	Battle of Evermore EP and Singles: Original Motion Picture Soundtrack	1992		
"The Battle of Evermore"	Page and Plant	No Quarter: Jimmy Page and Robert Plant Unledded	1994		
"The Battle of Evermore"	Michael White & the White	Plays the Music of Led Zeppelin	1995		
"The Battle of Evermore"	Jaz Coleman and the London Philharmonic Orchestra	Kashmir: Symphonic Led Zeppelin	1997		
"The Battle of Evermore"	Heart	Alive in Seattle	2003		
"The Battle of Evermore"	Arjen Anthony Lucassen	Lost in the New Real	2012		
"The Battle of Evermore"	SHEL	SHEL	2012		
"Black Dog"	CCS	C.C.S. 2	1972		
"Black Dog"	Dread Zeppelin	Un-Led-Ed	1990		
"Black Dog"	Eläkeläiset	Humppakäräjät	1994	titled "Musta Humppa"	
"Black Dog"	Foley	7 Years Ago... Directions in Smart-Alec Music	1992		
"Black Dog"	Paul Shaffer	The World's Most Dangerous Party	1993		
"Black Dog"	Deborah Harry	Debravation (8 ½) Producer's (Director's) Cut	1994	Recorded live at the Hammersmith Odeon, London on July 23, 1991	
"Black Dog"	Hampton String Quartet	Sympathy for the Devil	1995		
"Black Dog"	John Farnham	Anthology 3: Rarities	1997	Recorded live 1996	
"Black Dog"	Coalesce	There Is Nothing New Under the Sun EP	1999		
"Black Dog"	Masterplan	The Music Remains the Same: A Tribute to Led Zeppelin	2002		
"Black Dog"	Heart	Alive in Seattle	2003	Recorded live 2002	
"Black Dog"	Tracy Bonham	Bee EP	2003		
"Black Dog"	Those Darn Accordions	Lawnball	2004	Medley with "Whole Lotta Love"	
"Black Dog"	Tracy G	Deviating from the Set List	2004		
"Black Dog"	Hayseed Dixie	A Hot Piece of Grass	2005		
"Black Dog"	Larry Coryell, Victor Bailey, & Lenny White	Electric	2005		
"Black Dog"	Robert Plant & the Strange Sensation	Soundstage: Robert Plant and the Strange Sensation	2006		
"Black Dog"	Vitamin String Quartet	The String Quartet Tribute to Led Zeppelin	2006	Bonus DVD edition	
"Black Dog"	Heart	Dreamboat Annie Live	2007		
"Black Dog"	Ted Kooshian	Ted Kooshian's Standard Orbit Quartet	2008		
"Black Dog"	Mads Topping	The Playmaker	2008		
"Black Mountain Side"	Dread Zeppelin	Un-Led-Ed	1990		
"Black Mountain Side"	Vanilla Fudge	Out Through the In Door	2007		
"Black Mountain Side"	Hazelrigg Brothers	Where the Path Runs Straight and High	2024		
"Bron-Y-Aur Stomp"	Hangnail	Sucking the 70's	2002		
"Bron-Y-Aur Stomp"	Devil in a Woodpile	In Your Lonesome Town	2005		
"Bron-Y-Aur Stomp"	Hampton String Quartet	Take No Prisoners!	2005		
"Bron-Y-Aur Stomp"	Iron Horse	Whole Lotta Bluegrass: A Bluegrass Tribute to Led Zeppelin	2005		
"Bron-Y-Aur Stomp"	Vitamin String Quartet	The String Quartet Tribute to Led Zeppelin	2006	Bonus DVD edition	
"Bron-Yr-Aur"	Michael White & the White	Plays the Best of Led Zeppelin	1995		
"Bron-Yr-Aur"	The Section	The String Quartet Tribute to Led Zeppelin, Vol. 2	2002		
"Carouselambra"	Vitamin String Quartet	The String Quartet Tribute to Led Zeppelin	2006	Bonus DVD edition	
"Celebration Day"	Jimmy Page & the Black Crowes	Live at the Greek	2000		
"Celebration Day"	Dread Zeppelin	Bar Coda	2007		
"Communication Breakdown"	D.O.A.	Hardcore '81	1981		
"Communication Breakdown"	The Dickies	Stukas Over Disneyland	1983		
"Communication Breakdown"	Iron Maiden	B-side of "Bring Your Daughter... to the Slaughter"	1990		
"Communication Breakdown"	Dread Zeppelin	Rock'n Roll	1991		
"Communication Breakdown"	Jeff Healey	Cover to Cover	1995		
"Communication Breakdown"	Michael White & the White	Plays the Best of Led Zeppelin	1995		
"Communication Breakdown"	Jason Bonham Band	In the Name of My Father – The Zepset – Live from Electric Ladyland	1997	medley	
"Communication Breakdown"	The Flaming Lips	Finally the Punk Rockers Are Taking Acid	2002	Recorded 1989	
"Communication Breakdown"	Tierra Santa	The Music Remains the Same: A Tribute to Led Zeppelin	2002		
"Communication Breakdown"	Lez Zeppelin	Lez Zeppelin	2007		
"Communication Breakdown"	Slash and Myles Kennedy	Live in Manchester	2010		
"The Crunge"	Joshua Redman	Momentum	2005		
"The Crunge"	Gov't Mule	Holy Haunted House	2008	Recorded live 2007	
"Custard Pie"	Helmet with David Yow	Encomium: A Tribute to Led Zeppelin	1995		
"Custard Pie"	L.A. Guns	Hollywood Rehearsal	1998		
"Custard Pie"	Jimmy Page & the Black Crowes	Live at the Greek	2000		
"Custard Pie"	Hampton String Quartet	Take No Prisoners!	2005		
"Dancing Days"	Stone Temple Pilots	Encomium: A Tribute to Led Zeppelin	1995	Canada No. 46, Billboard Radio Songs No. 63, Mainstream Rock No. 3, Alternative Airplay No. 11	
"Dancing Days"	Vitamin String Quartet	The String Quartet Tribute to Led Zeppelin	2002	Bonus DVD edition	
"Dancing Days"	Hampton String Quartet	Take No Prisoners!	2005		
"Dancing Days"	Vanilla Fudge	Out Through the In Door	2007		
"Dancing Days"	Gov't Mule	Holy Haunted House	2007	Recorded live 2007	
"Dancing Days"	John Wetton & Geoff Downes	Led Box: The Ultimate Led Zeppelin Tribute	2008		
"Darlene"	Vitamin String Quartet ft. The Section	The String Quartet Tribute to Led Zeppelin, Vol. 2	2002		
"Down by the Seaside"	Tori Amos with Robert Plant	Encomium: A Tribute to Led Zeppelin	1995		
"D'yer Mak'er"	Eek-A-Mouse	U-Neek	1991		
"D'yer Mak'er"	For Real	It's a Natural Thang	1994		
"D'yer Mak'er"	Michael White & the White	Plays the Best of Led Zeppelin	1995		
"D'yer Mak'er"	Sheryl Crow	Encomium: A Tribute to Led Zeppelin	1995	Later included as a B-side to "What I Can Do for You"; reached No. 12 in Iceland	
"D'yer Mak'er"	Great White	Great Zeppelin: A Tribute to Led Zeppelin	1999		
"D'yer Mak'er"	311	311 Day: Live in New Orleans	2004		
"D'yer Mak'er"	Sly and Robbie	The Rhythm Remains the Same: Sly & Robbie Greets Led Zeppelin	2005		
"D'yer Mak'er"	Sean Kingston	Sean Kingston	2007	Sampled and repurposed the hook for his song "Me Love"	
"D'yer Mak'er"	Gov't Mule	Holy Haunted House	2008	Recorded live 2007	
"D'yer Mak'er"	Puddle of Mudd	Re:(disc)overed	2011		
"Fool in the Rain"	Maná	Hace Mucho Calor	1996		
"Fool in the Rain"	O.A.R. & Robert Randolph	Fool in the Rain	2004		
"Fool in the Rain"	Vanilla Fudge	Out Through the In Door	2007		
"Fool in the Rain"	Rick Wakeman	Led Box: The Ultimate Led Zeppelin Tribute	2008		
"Fool in the Rain"	Michael Cavanaugh	In Color	2009		
"Fool in the Rain"	Hazelrigg Brothers	Where the Path Runs Straight and High	2024		
"Four Sticks"	Unsane	Singles 89-92	1992	titled "4 Stix"	
"Four Sticks"	Page and Plant	No Quarter: Jimmy Page and Robert Plant Unledded	1994		
"Four Sticks"	Rollins Band	Encomium: A Tribute to Led Zeppelin	1995		
"Four Sticks"	Robert Plant & the Strange Sensation	Soundstage: Robert Plant and the Strange Sensation	2006		
"Four Sticks"	Sones de México Ensemble Chicago	Esta Tierra Es Tuya (This Land is Your Land)	2007		
"Four Sticks"	Soulfly	Omen	2010		
"Friends"	Stone	Colours	1990		
"Friends"	Page and Plant	No Quarter: Jimmy Page and Robert Plant Unledded	1994		
"Friends"	Hampton String Quartet	Sympathy for the Devil	1995	Medley with "Within You Without You"	
"Friends"	Jaz Coleman and the London Philharmonic Orchestra	Kashmir: Symphonic Led Zeppelin	1997		
"Friends"	Harry Slash & the Slashtones	Misty Mountain Hop: A Millennium Tribute to Led Zeppelin	2008		
"Friends"	Marco Benevento	Me Not Me	2009		
"Friends"	Hazelrigg Brothers	Where the Path Runs Straight and High	2024		
"Going to California"	Dread Zeppelin	Hot & Spicy Beanburger	1993		
"Going to California"	Never the Bride	Encomium: A Tribute to Led Zeppelin	1995		
"Going to California"	Michael White & the White	Plays the Music of Led Zeppelin	1995		
"Going to California"	Jaz Coleman and the London Philharmonic Orchestra	Kashmir: Symphonic Led Zeppelin	1997		
"Going to California"	Great White	Great Zeppelin: A Tribute to Led Zeppelin	1999		
"Going to California"	The String Quartet	The String Quartet Tribute to Led Zeppelin	1999		
"Going to California"	Fuel	Something Like Human	2003	Bonus tracks edition	
"Going to California"	Liz Larin	Wake Up, Start Dreaming	2005		
"Going to California"	Sly and Robbie	The Rhythm Remains the Same: Sly & Robbie Greets Led Zeppelin	2005		
"Going to California"	Vitamin String Quartet	The String Quartet Tribute to Led Zeppelin	2006	Bonus DVD edition	
"Going to California"	Jake Shimabukuro	My Life	2007		
"Going to California"	Makana	Ripe	2013		
"Going to California"	Amy Lee	Recover, Vol. 1	2016		
"Going to California"	Davey T Hamilton	2016	2016		
"Going to California"	Elisapie	Inuktitut	2023	In Inuktitut (title: "Californiamut")	
"Going to California"	Hazelrigg Brothers	Where the Path Runs Straight and High	2024		
"Good Times Bad Times"	Dread Zeppelin	Hot & Spicy Beanburger	1993		
"Good Times Bad Times"	Cracker	Encomium: A Tribute to Led Zeppelin	1995		
"Good Times Bad Times"	Carl Weathersby	Whole Lotta Blues: Songs of Led Zeppelin	1999		
"Good Times Bad Times"	Axxis	The Music Remains the Same: A Tribute to Led Zeppelin	2002		
"Good Times Bad Times"	The Section	The String Quartet Tribute to Led Zeppelin	2002		
"Good Times Bad Times"	Phish	Live Phish Volume 20	2003	Recorded 1994	
"Good Times Bad Times"	Tracy G	Hip Hop Tribute to Led Zeppelin	2005		
"Good Times Bad Times"	Godsmack	Good Times, Bad Times... Ten Years of Godsmack	2007		
"Good Times Bad Times"	Nuclear Assault	Survive	1988		
"Good Times Bad Times"	Eric Bloom	Led Box: The Ultimate Led Zeppelin Tribute	2008		
"Heartbreaker"	Dread Zeppelin	Un-Led-Ed	1990		
"Heartbreaker"	Michael White & the White	Plays the Music of Led Zeppelin	1995		
"Heartbreaker"	Alvin Youngblood Hart	Whole Lotta Blues: Songs of Led Zeppelin	1999		
"Heartbreaker"	Coalesce	There is Nothing New Under the Sun EP	1999		
"Heartbreaker"	Speed Limit	Going Nowhere Fast	1999		
"Heartbreaker"	Jimmy Page & the Black Crowes	Live at the Greek	2000		
"Heartbreaker"	The Section	The String Quartet Tribute to Led Zeppelin, Vol. 2	2002		
"Heartbreaker"	Nirvana	With the Lights Out	2004	Recorded live 1987	
"Heartbreaker"	Hampton String Quartet	Take No Prisoners!	2005		
"Heartbreaker"	Sly and Robbie	The Rhythm Remains the Same: Sly & Robbie Greets Led Zeppelin	2005		
"Heartbreaker"	Steve Morse	Led Box: The Ultimate Led Zeppelin Tribute	2008		
"Heartbreaker"	Train	Train Does Led Zeppelin II	2016		
"Hey, Hey, What Can I Do"	Dread Zeppelin	B-side to the band's "Immigrant Song" single	1990		
"Hey, Hey, What Can I Do"	Hootie & the Blowfish	Encomium: A Tribute to Led Zeppelin; Scattered, Smothered and Covered	1995		
"Hey, Hey, What Can I Do"	Chris Thomas King	Whole Lotta Blues: Songs of Led Zeppelin	1999		
"Hey, Hey, What Can I Do"	Jimmy Page & the Black Crowes	Live at the Greek	2000		
"Hot Dog"	Dread Zeppelin	Hot & Spicy Beanburger	1993		
"Hot Dog"	Clumsy Lovers	Under the Covers	2002		
"Houses of the Holy"	Pat Travers	Led Box: The Ultimate Led Zeppelin Tribute	2008		
"How Many More Times"	Dread Zeppelin	No Quarter Pounder	1995		
"How Many More Times"	Page and Plant	"Shining in the Light" CD single	1998		
"How Many More Times"	L.A. Guns	Shrinking Violet	1999		
"How Many More Times"	Liquid Tension Experiment	When the Keyboard Breaks: Live in Chicago	2009	Excerpt in another song	
"How Many More Times"	Phish	Chicago '94	2012	Recorded 1994	
"Immigrant Song"	Minimal Compact	The Figure One Cuts	1987		
"Immigrant Song"	Great White	Recovery: Live!	1988		
"Immigrant Song"	Royal Crescent Mob	Something New, Old, and Borrowed	1988		
"Immigrant Song"	Dark Angel	Leave Scars	1989		
"Immigrant Song"	Dread Zeppelin	Un-Led-Ed	1990		
"Immigrant Song"	Dread Zeppelin	Rock'n Roll	1991	Live version	
"Immigrant Song"	Infectious Grooves	Sarsippius' Ark	1993		
"Immigrant Song"	Michael White & the White	Plays the Best of Led Zeppelin	1995		
"Immigrant Song"	Gotthard	G.	1996	Asian version only	
"Immigrant Song"	Coalesce	There Is Nothing New Under the Sun EP	1999		
"Immigrant Song"	Great White	Great Zeppelin: A Tribute to Led Zeppelin	1999		
"Immigrant Song"	Adagio	Sanctus Ignis	2001		
"Immigrant Song"	Consortium Project	The Music Remains the Same: A Tribute to Led Zeppelin	2002		
"Immigrant Song"	Nirvana	With the Lights Out	2004	Rehearsal recorded 1988	
"Immigrant Song"	Tomoyasu Hotei	Electric Samurai (The Noble Savage)	2004		
"Immigrant Song"	Tracy G	Deviating from the Set List	2004		
"Immigrant Song"	Cyro Baptista	Love the Donkey	2005		
"Immigrant Song"	Demons & Wizards	Touched by the Crimson King	2005		
"Immigrant Song"	Iron Horse	Whole Lotta Bluegrass: A Bluegrass Tribute to Led Zeppelin	2005		
"Immigrant Song"	Gotthard	Made In Switzerland	2006		
"Immigrant Song"	Vitamin String Quartet	The String Quartet Tribute to Led Zeppelin	2006	Bonus DVD edition	
"Immigrant Song"	Ann Wilson	Hope & Glory	2007		
"Immigrant Song"	Vanilla Fudge	Out Through the In Door	2007		
"Immigrant Song"	Manny Charlton	Led Box: The Ultimate Led Zeppelin Tribute	2008		
"Immigrant Song"	Hollywood Undead	Desperate Measures	2009	CD/DVD	
"Immigrant Song"	Karen O with Trent Reznor and Atticus Ross	The Girl with the Dragon Tattoo	2011	Soundtrack album	
"Immigrant Song"	Stryper	The Covering	2011		
"Immigrant Song"	Tarja Turunen and Mike Terrana	Beauty and the Beat	2014	Part of "Led Zeppelin Medley"	
"Immigrant Song"	Heidevolk	Velua	2015		
"In the Evening"	Jason Bonham Band	In the Name of My Father – The Zepset – Live from Electric Ladyland	1997		
"In the Evening"	Sly and Robbie	The Rhythm Remains the Same: Sly & Robbie Greets Led Zeppelin	2005		
"In the Evening"	Tracy G	Hip Hop Tribute to Led Zeppelin	2005		
"In the Light"	Great White	Great Zeppelin: A Tribute to Led Zeppelin	1999		
"In the Light"	Jimmy Page & the Black Crowes	Live at the Greek	2000	Bonus tracks edition	
"Kashmir"	The Ordinaires	One	1989		
"Kashmir"	Dread Zeppelin	Hot & Spicy Beanburger	1993		
"Kashmir"	Page and Plant	No Quarter: Jimmy Page and Robert Plant Unledded	1994		
"Kashmir"	Michael White & the White	Plays the Best of Led Zeppelin	1995		
"Kashmir"	London Philharmonic Orchestra	Kashmir: Symphonic Led Zeppelin	1997		
"Kashmir"	Puff Daddy feat. Jimmy Page	Godzilla: The Album	1998	"Come with Me" from Godzilla	
"Kashmir"	Angra	The Music Remains the Same: A Tribute to Led Zeppelin	2002		
"Kashmir"	Bond	Shine	2002		
"Kashmir"	Cactus Jack	Natur all	2004		
"Kashmir"	Iron Horse	Whole Lotta Bluegrass: A Bluegrass Tribute to Led Zeppelin	2005		
"Kashmir"	Sly and Robbie	The Rhythm Remains the Same: Sly & Robbie Greets Led Zeppelin	2005		
"Kashmir"	Lez Zeppelin	Lez Zeppelin	2007		
"Kashmir"	Paul Di'Anno & Staffan Österlind	Led Box - The Ultimate Led Zeppelin Tribute	2008	Also released on the album ‘’World's Greatest Metal Tribute to Led Zeppelin’’ 2006	
"Kashmir"	Escala	Escala	2009		
"Kashmir"	Gregorian	Masters of Chant Chapter VII	2009		
"Kashmir"	Dave Matthews and Tim Reynolds	Live in Las Vegas	2010		
"Kashmir"	Maya Beiser	Provenance	2010		
"Kashmir"	Tarja Turunen and Mike Terrana	Beauty and the Beat	2014	Part of "Led Zeppelin Medley"	
"Kashmir"	Jenny Oaks Baker	Classic: The Rock Album	2014	Mashup with Vivaldi's "Summer" from The Four Seasons	
"Kashmir"	Songhoy Blues	Music in Exile (Deluxe Edition)	2015	Also released on Mojo's 2015 compilation Physical Graffiti Redrawn	
"Kashmir"	Vincent Peirani	Living Being II: Night Walker	2017	Instrumental suite featuring the accordion. The opening has a little secret for those who know.	
"Kashmir"	Starset	Exclusive broadcast on Amazon music	2021		
"Kashmir"	Marcin	Non-album single	2021		
"Kashmir"	Lindsey Stirling	Non-album single	2023		
"Living Loving Maid (She's Just a Woman)"	Dread Zeppelin	Un-Led-Ed	1990		
"Living Loving Maid (She's Just a Woman)"	Great White	Great Zeppelin: A Tribute to Led Zeppelin	1999		
"Living Loving Maid (She's Just a Woman)"	The Section	The String Quartet Tribute to Led Zeppelin, Vol. 2	2002		
"Living Loving Maid (She's Just a Woman)"	Train	Train Does Led Zeppelin II	2016		
"Misty Mountain Hop"	Dread Zeppelin	5,000,000	1991		
"Misty Mountain Hop"	4 Non Blondes	Encomium: A Tribute to Led Zeppelin	1995		
"Misty Mountain Hop"	Jimmy Page & the Black Crowes	Live at the Greek	2000	Japanese bonus tracks edition	
"Misty Mountain Hop"	Glenn Hughes	Music for the Divine	2006	Bonus tracks edition	
"Misty Mountain Hop"	Heart	Dreamboat Annie Live	2007		
"Misty Mountain Hop"	Harry Slash & the Slashtones	Misty Mountain Hop: A Millennium Tribute to Led Zeppelin	2008		
"Moby Dick"	Dread Zeppelin	Un-Led-Ed	1990		
"Moby Dick"	Nirvana	With the Lights Out	2004	Recorded live 1988	
"Moby Dick"	Sly and Robbie	The Rhythm Remains the Same: Sly & Robbie Greets Led Zeppelin	2005		
"Moby Dick"	Vitamin String Quartet	The String Quartet Tribute to Led Zeppelin	2006	Bonus DVD edition	
"Moby Dick"	Vanilla Fudge	Out Through the In Door	2007		
"Moby Dick"	Chad Smith's Bombastic Meatbats	More Meat	2010		
"Moby Dick"	Train	Train Does Led Zeppelin II	2016		
"Night Flight"	Jeff Buckley	Live at Sin-é	2003	Bonus tracks edition	
"Night Flight"	Jeff Buckley	You and I	2016		
"No Quarter"	Crowbar	Crowbar	1993		
"No Quarter"	Page and Plant	No Quarter: Jimmy Page and Robert Plant Unledded	1994		
"No Quarter"	Dread Zeppelin	No Quarter Pounder	1995		
"No Quarter"	Great White	Great Zeppelin: A Tribute to Led Zeppelin	1999		
"No Quarter"	Grave Digger	The Music Remains the Same: A Tribute to Led Zeppelin	2002		
"No Quarter"	Maktub	Khronos	2002		
"No Quarter"	Tool	Salival	2000		
"No Quarter"	Star One	Space Metal	2002	Japanese bonus tracks edition	
"No Quarter"	The Section	The String Quartet Tribute to Led Zeppelin	2002		
"No Quarter"	Quidam	The Time Beneath the Sky	2002		
"No Quarter"	Ayreon	"Day Eleven: Love"	2004	CD single	
"No Quarter"	Exhumed	Garbage Daze Re-Regurgitated	2005		
"No Quarter"	Sly and Robbie	The Rhythm Remains the Same: Sly & Robbie Greets Led Zeppelin	2005		
"No Quarter"	The Flaming Lips	At War with the Mystics 5.1	2006		
"No Quarter"	Gov't Mule	Holy Haunted House	2008	Recorded live 2007	
"No Quarter"	Hazelrigg Brothers	Where the Path Runs Straight and High	2024		
"Nobody's Fault but Mine"	Dread Zeppelin	5,000,000	1991		
"Nobody's Fault but Mine"	Page and Plant	No Quarter: Jimmy Page and Robert Plant Unledded	1994		
"Nobody's Fault but Mine"	The 77s	Drowning with Land in Sight	1994	With additional credit "apologies to Blind Willie Johnson"	
"Nobody's Fault but Mine"	Michael White & the White	Plays the Best of Led Zeppelin	1995		
"Nobody's Fault but Mine"	Jimmy Page & the Black Crowes	Live at the Greek	2000		
"Nobody's Fault but Mine"	Kelly Richey	Live ... As It Should Be	2003		
"Nobody's Fault but Mine"	Sister Rosetta Tharpe	The Gospel of the Blues	2003	Included in soundtrack to Death on the Nile (2022 film)	
"The Ocean"	Zebra	Live	1990	Recorded 1989	
"The Ocean"	Living Colour	Biscuits	1991	Japanese bonus tracks edition	
"The Ocean"	Tesla	Bust a Nut	1994	Japanese bonus tracks edition	
"The Ocean"	Jason Bonham Band	In the Name of My Father – The Zepset – Live from Electric Ladyland	1997		
"The Ocean"	Planet Hemp	Os Cães Ladram Mas a Caravana Não Pára	1997	Titled "Adoled (The Ocean)", with lyrics in portuguese by BNegão and Marcelo D2	
"The Ocean"	Bonerama	Bringing It Home	2007	Titled "Ocean"	
"The Ocean"	Lez Zeppelin	Lez Zeppelin	2007		
"The Ocean"	Dread Zeppelin	Bar Coda	2008		
"The Ocean"	Gov't Mule	Holy Haunted House	2008	Recorded live 2007	
"Out on the Tiles"	Toxik	Think This	1989		
"Out on the Tiles"	Blind Melon	Encomium: A Tribute to Led Zeppelin	1995		
"Out on the Tiles"	Coalesce	There Is Nothing New Under the Sun EP	1999		
"Out on the Tiles"	Jimmy Page & the Black Crowes	Live at the Greek	2000		
"Out on the Tiles"	Megadeth	United Abominations	2007	Bonus track on Japan edition	
"Out on the Tiles"	Dread Zeppelin	Bar Coda	2007		
"Over the Hills and Far Away"	Nikki Boyer	Livin', Lovin', Played: A Tribute to Led Zeppelin	2002		
"Over the Hills and Far Away"	Chris Poland and Snowblynd	Misty Mountain Hop: A Millennium Tribute to Led Zeppelin	2008		
"Over the Hills and Far Away"	Gov't Mule	Holy Haunted House	2008	Recorded live in 2007	
"Over the Hills and Far Away"	John Craigie	Paper Airplane	2012		
"Poor Tom"	Robert Walter	Super Heavy Organ	2005		
"The Rain Song"	Page and Plant	Gallows Pole EP	1994		
"The Rain Song"	Jason Bonham Band	In the Name of My Father – The Zepset – Live from Electric Ladyland	1997		
"The Rain Song"	Sly and Robbie	The Rhythm Remains the Same: Sly & Robbie Greets Led Zeppelin	2005		
"The Rain Song"	Gov't Mule	Holy Haunted House	2008	Recorded live 2007	
"The Rain Song"	Hazelrigg Brothers	Where the Path Runs Straight and High	2024		
"Ramble On"	Dread Zeppelin	It's Not Unusual	1992		
"Ramble On"	Dread Zeppelin	No Quarter Pounder	1995		
"Ramble On"	Jason Bonham Band	In the Name of My Father – The Zepset – Live from Electric Ladyland	1997		
"Ramble On"	Great White	Great Zeppelin: A Tribute to Led Zeppelin	1999		
"Ramble On"	Iron Horse	Whole Lotta Bluegrass: A Bluegrass Tribute to Led Zeppelin	2005		
"Ramble On"	Vanilla Fudge	Out Through the In Door	2007		
"Ramble On"	Chris Poland	Misty Mountain Hop: A Millennium Tribute to Led Zeppelin	2008		
"Ramble On"	Foo Fighters with Jimmy Page & John Paul Jones	Live at Wembley Stadium	2008	DVD	
"Ramble On"	Rick Derringer	Led Box: The Ultimate Led Zeppelin Tribute	2008		
"Ramble On"	Train	Train Does Led Zeppelin II	2016		
"Ramble On"	James LaBrie	Beautiful Shade Of Grey	2022		
"Ramble On"	Billy Strings	Away from the Shire	2022		
"Rock and Roll"	Heart	Greatest Hits Live	1980		
"Rock and Roll"	Great White	Recovery: Live!	1988		
"Rock and Roll"	Dread Zeppelin	Rock'n Roll	1991		
"Rock and Roll"	Gotthard	Dial Hard	1994		
"Rock and Roll"	Clarence "Gatemouth" Brown	Whole Lotta Blues: Songs of Led Zeppelin	1999		
"Rock and Roll"	Double Trouble with Susan Tedeschi and Kenny Wayne Shepherd	Been a Long Time	2001		
"Rock and Roll"	Rasputina	The Lost & Found	2001		
"Rock and Roll"	Cactus Jack	DisCover	2002		
"Rock and Roll"	Elegy	The Music Remains the Same: A Tribute to Led Zeppelin	2002		
"Rock and Roll"	Van Halen	Live Without a Net	2004	Recorded 1986	
"Rock and Roll"	Chris Norman	One Acoustic Evening	2005		
"Rock and Roll"	Iron Horse	Whole Lotta Bluegrass: A Bluegrass Tribute to Led Zeppelin	2005		
"Rock and Roll"	Roger Daltrey	Moonlighting: The Anthology	2005		
"Rock and Roll"	Susan Tedeschi	The Best of Susan Tedeschi: Episode One	2005		
"Rock and Roll"	Jerry Lee Lewis with Jimmy Page	Last Man Standing	2006		
"Rock and Roll"	Stevie Nicks	Crystal Visions – The Very Best of Stevie Nicks	2007	Recorded live 2005	
"Rock and Roll"	Vanilla Fudge	Out Through the In Door	2007		
"Rock and Roll"	Lez Zeppelin	Lez Zeppelin	2007		
"Rock and Roll"	Albert Cummings	Feel So Good	2008		
"Rock and Roll"	Alvin and the Chipmunks	Undeniable	2008		
"Rock and Roll"	Foo Fighters with Jimmy Page & John Paul Jones	Live at Wembley Stadium	2008	DVD	
"Rock and Roll"	Steve Lukather	Led Box: The Ultimate Led Zeppelin Tribute	2008		
"Rock and Roll"	John Waite	In Real Time	2010		
"The Rover"	Dream Theater	A Change of Seasons EP	1995	Medley	
"The Rover"	Great White	Great Zeppelin: A Tribute to Led Zeppelin	1999		
"The Rover"	Primal Fear	The Music Remains the Same: A Tribute to Led Zeppelin	2002		
"The Rover"	Dread Zeppelin	Bar Coda	2008		
"Sick Again"	Jimmy Page & the Black Crowes	Live at the Greek	2000		
"Since I've Been Loving You"	Page and Plant	No Quarter: Jimmy Page and Robert Plant Unledded	1994		
"Since I've Been Loving You"	Jason Bonham Band	In the Name of My Father – The Zepset – Live from Electric Ladyland	1997		
"Since I've Been Loving You"	Great White	Great Zeppelin: A Tribute to Led Zeppelin	1999		
"Since I've Been Loving You"	Otis Clay	Whole Lotta Blues: Songs of Led Zeppelin	1999		
"Since I've Been Loving You"	Corinne Bailey Rae	Corinne Bailey Rae	2006	Bonus tracks edition	
"Since I've Been Loving You"	Lez Zeppelin	Lez Zeppelin	2007		
"Since I've Been Loving You"	Europe	Almost Unplugged	2008		
"The Song Remains the Same"	Dread Zeppelin	5,000,000	1991		
"The Song Remains the Same"	Dream Theater	A Change of Seasons EP	1995	Medley	
"The Song Remains the Same"	Jason Bonham Band	In the Name of My Father – The Zepset – Live from Electric Ladyland	1997		
"The Song Remains the Same"	Gov't Mule	Holy Haunted House	2008	Recorded live 2007	
"Stairway to Heaven"	London Symphony Orchestra and the Royal Choral Society	Classic Rock – Rock Classics	1981		
"Stairway to Heaven"	Far Corporation	Division One	1985	UK No. 8, Ireland No. 9 (1985); South Africa No. 16, Australia No. 23 (1986)	
"Stairway to Heaven"	Vincent Peirani	Living Being II: Night Walker	2017	Instrumental suite featuring the accordion. The opening has a little secret for those who know.	
"Stairway to Heaven"	Stanley Jordan	Flying Home	1988		
"Stairway to Heaven"	Justin Hayward	Classic Blue	1989		
"Stairway to Heaven"	Dread Zeppelin	Rock'n Roll & 5,000,000	1991		
"Stairway to Heaven"	Frank Zappa	The Best Band You Never Heard in Your Life	1991	Live version	
"Stairway to Heaven"	Those Darn Accordions	Vongole Fisarmonica	1992		
"Stairway to Heaven"	Rolf Harris	UK single	1993	No 7 in UK singles chart	
"Stairway to Heaven"	Dread Zeppelin	Hot & Spicy Beanburger	1993		
"Stairway to Heaven"	Leningrad Cowboys	Happy Together	1994		
"Stairway to Heaven"	Hampton String Quartet	Sympathy for the Devil	1995		
"Stairway to Heaven"	Michael White & the White	Plays the Best of Led Zeppelin	1995		
"Stairway to Heaven"	Tiny Tim with Brave Combo	Girl	1996		
"Stairway to Heaven"	Pat Boone	In a Metal Mood: No More Mr. Nice Guy	1997		
"Stairway to Heaven"	London Philharmonic Orchestra	Kashmir: Symphonic Led Zeppelin	1997		
"Stairway to Heaven"	Great White	Great Zeppelin: A Tribute to Led Zeppelin	1999		
"Stairway to Heaven"	Gregorian	Masters of Chant Chapter II	2001		
"Stairway to Heaven"	Dolly Parton	Halos & Horns	2002		
"Stairway to Heaven"	White Skull	The Music Remains the Same: A Tribute to Led Zeppelin	2002		
"Stairway to Heaven"	Heart	Little Queen (2004 reissue) / "Stairway to Heaven (Live at the Kennedy Center Honors)" (single)	2004 / 2013	Live versions	
"Stairway to Heaven"	Iron Horse	Whole Lotta Bluegrass: A Bluegrass Tribute to Led Zeppelin	2005		
"Stairway to Heaven"	Rodrigo y Gabriela	Rodrigo y Gabriela	2006		
"Stairway to Heaven"	Vitamin String Quartet	The String Quartet Tribute to Led Zeppelin	2006	Bonus DVD edition	
"Stairway to Heaven"	Mary J. Blige with Travis Barker, Randy Jackson, Steve Vai and Orianthi	Stronger with Each Tear	2009	International edition only	
"Stairway to Heaven"	Jenny Oaks Baker	Classic: The Rock Album	2014		
"Stairway to Heaven"	Tarja Turunen and Mike Terrana	Beauty and the Beat	2014	Part of "Led Zeppelin Medley"	
"Stairway to Heaven"	Mastodon	Stairway to Nick John	2019		
"Tangerine"	Big Head Todd and the Monsters	Encomium: A Tribute to Led Zeppelin	1995		
"Tangerine"	Great White	Great Zeppelin: A Tribute to Led Zeppelin	1999		
"Tangerine"	The Section	The String Quartet Tribute to Led Zeppelin, Vol. 2	2002		
"Tangerine"	The Thermals	Bridging the Distance	2007		
"Tea for One"	Joe Bonamassa	You and Me	2006		
"Ten Years Gone"	Jason Bonham Band	In the Name of My Father – The Zepset – Live from Electric Ladyland	1997		
"Ten Years Gone"	Jimmy Page & the Black Crowes	Live at the Greek	2000		
"Ten Years Gone"	The Section	The String Quartet Tribute to Led Zeppelin, Vol. 2	2002		
"Thank You"	Tori Amos	Crucify EP	1992		
"Thank You"	Page and Plant	No Quarter: Jimmy Page and Robert Plant Unledded	1994		
"Thank You"	Duran Duran	Encomium: A Tribute to Led Zeppelin; Thank You	1995		
"Thank You"	The Flaming Lips	A Collection of Songs Representing an Enthusiasm for Recording...By Amateurs	1998		
"Thank You"	Coalesce	There Is Nothing New Under the Sun EP	1999		
"Thank You"	Great White	Great Zeppelin: A Tribute to Led Zeppelin	1999		
"Thank You"	The Section	The String Quartet Tribute to Led Zeppelin	2002		
"Thank You"	Sly and Robbie	The Rhythm Remains the Same: Sly & Robbie Greets Led Zeppelin	2005		
"Thank You"	Tesla	Real to Reel	2007		
"Thank You"	Dread Zeppelin	Bar Coda	2008		
"Thank You"	Lizz Wright	The Orchard	2008		
"Thank You"	Tori Amos	Live at Montreux 1991/1992	2008		
"Thank You"	Chris Cornell	Songbook	2011		
"Thank You"	Train	Train Does Led Zeppelin II	2016		
"Thank You"	Hazelrigg Brothers	Where the Path Runs Straight and High	2024		
"That's the Way"	Page and Plant	No Quarter: Jimmy Page and Robert Plant Unledded	1994		
"That's the Way"	The Blenders	Now and Then	1997		
"That's the Way"	Coalesce	There Is Nothing New Under the Sun EP	1999		
"That's the Way"	John Craigie	Paper Airplane	2012		
"Trampled Under Foot"	Eric Gales	Whole Lotta Blues: Songs of Led Zeppelin	1999		
"Trampled Under Foot"	Hampton String Quartet	Take No Prisoners!	2005		
"Trampled Under Foot"	Tracy G	Hip Hop Tribute to Led Zeppelin	2005		
"Trampled Under Foot"	Vanilla Fudge	Out Through the In Door	2007		
"The Wanton Song"	Earth Crisis	Last of the Sane	2001		
"Wearing and Tearing"	Robert Plant with Jimmy Page	Knebworth: The Album	1990		
"What Is and What Should Never Be"	Dread Zeppelin	No Quarter Pounder	1995		
"What Is and What Should Never Be"	Billy Joel	VH1 Storytellers	1997	Medley	
"What Is and What Should Never Be"	Jimmy Page & the Black Crowes	Live at the Greek	2000		
"What Is and What Should Never Be"	Vitamin String Quartet	The String Quartet Tribute to Led Zeppelin	2006	Bonus DVD edition	
"What Is and What Should Never Be"	Train	Train Does Led Zeppelin II	2016		
"Your Time Is Gonna Come"	Sandie Shaw	Reviewing the Situation	1969		
"Your Time Is Gonna Come"	Dread Zeppelin	Un-Led-Ed	1990		
"Your Time Is Gonna Come"	Jimmy Page & the Black Crowes	Live at the Greek	2000		
"Your Time Is Gonna Come"	Wolfgang	Black Mantra	2001		
"Your Time Is Gonna Come"	Iron Horse	Whole Lotta Bluegrass: A Bluegrass Tribute to Led Zeppelin	2005		
"Your Time Is Gonna Come"	Vanilla Fudge	Out Through the In Door	2007		

== Samples and interpolations ==
The following list contains songs by other artists that have sampled and interpolated songs by Led Zeppelin.

Led Zeppelin Song	Artist	Song	Year	Notes	Ref.
"Black Dog"	"Weird Al" Yankovic	"Trapped in the Drive-Thru"	2006	Contains a brief interpolation of the song.	
"Kashmir"	Schoolly D	"Signifying Rapper"	1988	Interpolates the guitar riff resulting in a lawsuit.	
"Kashmir"	Puff Daddy feat. Jimmy Page	"Come with Me"	1998	Led Zeppelin guitarist Jimmy Page was recruited to replay his parts from Kashmir on this song.	
"Moby Dick"	Beastie Boys	"What Comes Around"	1989	Samples the drum break	
"The Ocean"	Beastie Boys	"She's Crafty"	1986	Samples the guitar riff	
"When The Levee Breaks"	Beastie Boys	"Rhymin & Stealin"	1986	Samples the drum beat	
"When The Levee Breaks"	Saint Etienne	"Only Love Can Break Your Heart"	1991	Samples the drum beat	
"When The Levee Breaks"	Dr. Dre feat. The Lady of Rage, Kurupt, and RBX	"Lyrical Gangbang"	1992	Samples the drum beat	
"When The Levee Breaks"	Björk	"Army of Me"	1995	Samples the drum beat	
"When The Levee Breaks"	Eminem	"Kim"	2000	Samples the drum beat	
