= Mothership (Led Zeppelin album) =

Greatest hits album by Led Zeppelin
- Released: 12 November 2007
- Recorded: October 1968 – December 1978
- Genres: Hard rock; heavy metal; blues rock; folk rock
- Length: 135:53
- Label: Atlantic
- Producer: Jimmy Page
- Compilers: John Paul Jones, Jimmy Page, and Robert Plant

Led Zeppelin chronology
How the West Was Won (2003)	Mothership (2007)	Led Zeppelin Definitive Collection (2008)

Professional ratings
Review scores
Source	Rating
AllMusic	4.5/5 stars
Blender	4.5/5 stars
The Encyclopedia of Popular Music	4/5 stars
IGN	9.6/10
musicOMH	5/5 stars
Mojo	5/5 stars
NME	10/10
Q	5/5 stars
The Times	5/5 stars
Uncut	5/5 stars

Mothership is a compilation album by the English rock band Led Zeppelin, released by Atlantic Records and Rhino Entertainment on 12 November 2007 in the United Kingdom, and 13 November 2007 in the United States. It was released on the same day that Led Zeppelin's entire catalogue became available in digital stores, including the iTunes Store. The cover was designed by artist Shepard Fairey.

The songs included were chosen by the surviving members of Led Zeppelin, Robert Plant, Jimmy Page and John Paul Jones, and represent the band's eight studio albums. In addition to a two-disc set, the album is also available in both "deluxe" and "collector's" editions with a DVD featuring varied live content from the previously released Led Zeppelin DVD (2003). A 4-LP vinyl package was also released on 26 August 2008. On 6 November 2015, the album was reissued using the audio from the band's 2014–15 remaster campaign.

On 8 November 2007, a temporary XM Satellite Radio station, XM LED was made to promote the album.

== Commercial performance ==
Packaging for the four-disc LP set.

The album debuted at #4 in the UK Albums Chart, with 58,000 units sold, and debuted at #1 on the Official New Zealand Albums Chart and stayed there for several weeks. The album also debuted at #7 on the US Billboard 200 chart, selling about 136,000 copies in its first week. The album has sold over 2.1 million copies in the U.S and over 4.5 million copies worldwide, leading to it being certified 2× Platinum by the RIAA.

== Track listing ==
=== CD ===
The two-CD edition shares most tracks with the original two-CD compilation Led Zeppelin Remasters, but with "When the Levee Breaks" and "Over the Hills and Far Away" instead of "Celebration Day" and "The Battle of Evermore." It also shares most tracks with The Best of Led Zeppelin (with "Ramble On", "Heartbreaker", "Over the Hills and Far Away", and "D'yer Mak'er" instead of "What Is and What Should Never Be", "The Battle of Evermore", and "Ten Years Gone").

Disc one
No.	Title	Writer(s)	Length
1.	"Good Times Bad Times" (from Led Zeppelin, 1969)	John Bonham, John Paul Jones, and Jimmy Page	2:48
2.	"Communication Breakdown" (from Led Zeppelin)	Bonham, Jones, and Page	2:30
3.	"Dazed and Confused" (from Led Zeppelin)	Page (inspired by Jake Holmes)	6:28
4.	"Babe I'm Gonna Leave You" (from Led Zeppelin)	Anne Bredon, Page, and Robert Plant	6:42
5.	"Whole Lotta Love" (from Led Zeppelin II, 1969)	Bonham, Willie Dixon, Jones, Page, and Plant	5:34
6.	"Ramble On" (from Led Zeppelin II)	Page and Plant	4:28
7.	"Heartbreaker" (from Led Zeppelin II)	Bonham, Jones, Page, and Plant	4:16
8.	"Immigrant Song" (from Led Zeppelin III, 1970)	Page and Plant	2:27
9.	"Since I've Been Loving You" (from Led Zeppelin III)	Jones, Page, and Plant	7:24
10.	"Rock and Roll" (from Led Zeppelin IV, 1971)	Bonham, Jones, Page, and Plant	3:41
11.	"Black Dog" (from Led Zeppelin IV)	Jones, Page, and Plant	4:58
12.	"When the Levee Breaks" (from Led Zeppelin IV)	Bonham, Jones, Memphis Minnie, Page, and Plant	7:10
13.	"Stairway to Heaven" (from Led Zeppelin IV)	Page and Plant	8:02
Total length:			66:21

Disc two
No.	Title	Writer(s)	Length
1.	"The Song Remains the Same" (from Houses of the Holy, 1973)	Page and Plant	5:32
2.	"Over the Hills and Far Away" (from Houses of the Holy)	Page and Plant	4:49
3.	"D'yer Mak'er" (from Houses of the Holy)	Bonham, Jones, Page, and Plant	4:24
4.	"No Quarter" (from Houses of the Holy)	Jones, Page, and Plant	7:00
5.	"Trampled Under Foot" (from Physical Graffiti, 1975)	Jones, Page, and Plant	5:36
6.	"Houses of the Holy" (from Physical Graffiti)	Page and Plant	4:04
7.	"Kashmir" (from Physical Graffiti)	Bonham, Page, and Plant	8:33
8.	"Nobody's Fault but Mine" (from Presence, 1976)	Page and Plant	6:30
9.	"Achilles Last Stand" (from Presence)	Page and Plant	10:25
10.	"In the Evening" (from In Through the Out Door, 1979)	Jones, Page, and Plant	6:51
11.	"All My Love" (from In Through the Out Door)	Jones and Plant	5:54
Total length:			69:32

Disc three – excerpts from Led Zeppelin DVD (20 out of 39)
No.	Title	Writer(s)	Length
1.	"We're Gonna Groove" (from Royal Albert Hall – 9 January 1970)	James A. Bethea and Ben E. King	3:14
2.	"I Can't Quit You Baby" (from Royal Albert Hall – 9 January 1970, packaging and DVD named it "I Can't Quit You Babe")	Dixon	6:55
3.	"Dazed and Confused (Beginning Part)" (from Royal Albert Hall – 9 January 1970)	Page (inspired by Jake Holmes)	5:22
4.	"White Summer (Beginning Part)" (from Royal Albert Hall – 9 January 1970)	Page	3:46
5.	"What Is and What Should Never Be" (from Royal Albert Hall – 9 January 1970)	Page and Plant	4:26
6.	"Moby Dick (Ending Part)" (from Royal Albert Hall – 9 January 1970)	Bonham, Jones, and Page	3:29
7.	"Whole Lotta Love" (from Royal Albert Hall – 9 January 1970)	Bonham, Jones, Page, and Plant	6:19
8.	"Communication Breakdown" (from Royal Albert Hall – 9 January 1970)	Bonham, Jones, and Page	5:44
9.	"Bring It On Home/Bring It On Back" (from Royal Albert Hall – 9 January 1970)	Page and Plant	7:46
10.	"Immigrant Song" (from Sydney Showground – 27 February 1972)	Page and Plant	4:06
11.	"Black Dog" (from Madison Square Garden – 28 July 1973)	Jones, Page, and Plant	5:31
12.	"Misty Mountain Hop" (from Madison Square Garden – 27 July & 28, 1973)	Jones, Page, and Plant	4:52
13.	"The Ocean" (from Madison Square Garden – 27 July & 29, 1973)	Bonham, Jones, Page, and Plant	4:37
14.	"Going to California" (from Earls Court – 25 May 1975)	Page and Plant	5:02
15.	"In My Time of Dying" (from Earls Court – 24 May 1975)	Bonham, Jones, Page, and Plant	11:19
16.	"Stairway to Heaven" (from Earls Court – 25 May 1975)	Page and Plant	10:46
17.	"Rock and Roll" (from Knebworth – 4 August 1979)	Bonham, Jones, Page, and Plant	3:55
18.	"Nobody's Fault but Mine" (from Knebworth – 4 August 1979)	Page and Plant	5:47
19.	"Kashmir" (from Knebworth – 4 August 1979)	Bonham, Page, and Plant	8:58
20.	"Whole Lotta Love" (from Knebworth – 4 August 1979)	Bonham, Jones, Page, and Plant	8:40
Total length:			2:00:34

=== LP ===
Side A
No.	Title	Original album	Length
1.	"Good Times Bad Times"	Led Zeppelin	2:48
2.	"Communication Breakdown"	Led Zeppelin	2:30
3.	"Dazed and Confused"	Led Zeppelin	6:28
4.	"Babe I'm Gonna Leave You"	Led Zeppelin	6:42
Total length:			18:27

Side B
No.	Title	Original album	Length
1.	"Whole Lotta Love"	Led Zeppelin II	5:34
2.	"Ramble On"	Led Zeppelin II	4:24
3.	"Heartbreaker"	Led Zeppelin II	4:14
4.	"Immigrant Song"	Led Zeppelin III	2:27
Total length:			16:39

Side C
No.	Title	Original album	Length
1.	"Since I've Been Loving You"	Led Zeppelin III	7:24
2.	"Rock and Roll"	Led Zeppelin IV	3:41
3.	"Black Dog"	Led Zeppelin IV	4:58
Total length:			16:03

Side D
No.	Title	Original album	Length
1.	"When the Levee Breaks"	Led Zeppelin IV	7:10
2.	"Stairway to Heaven"	Led Zeppelin IV	8:02
3.	"The Song Remains the Same"	Houses of the Holy	5:31
Total length:			20:53

Side E
No.	Title	Original album	Length
1.	"Over the Hills and Far Away"	Houses of the Holy	4:50
2.	"D'yer Mak'er"	Houses of the Holy	4:23
3.	"No Quarter"	Houses of the Holy	7:00
Total length:			16:13

Side F
No.	Title	Original album	Length
1.	"Trampled Under Foot"	Physical Graffiti	5:36
2.	"Houses of the Holy"	Physical Graffiti	4:03
3.	"Kashmir"	Physical Graffiti	8:33
Total length:			18:12

Side G
No.	Title	Original album	Length
1.	"Nobody's Fault but Mine"	Presence	6:27
2.	"Achilles Last Stand"	Presence	10:25
Total length:			16:52

Side H
No.	Title	Original album	Length
1.	"In The Evening"	In Through the Out Door	6:51
2.	"All My Love"	In Through the Out Door	5:53
Total length:			12:44

== Personnel ==
Led Zeppelin

- John Bonham – drums, percussion
- John Paul Jones – bass guitar, keyboards, mandolin, recorders
- Jimmy Page – acoustic and electric guitars, production
- Robert Plant – vocals, harmonica

Additional personnel

- Dick Barnatt – photography
- John C. F. Davis – remastering
- Ian Dickson – photography
- Carl Dunn – photography
- Shepard Fairey – art direction, design
- David Fricke – Liner notes
- Peter Grant – executive production
- Bob Gruen – photography
- Ross Halfin – photo research
- Neal Preston – photography
- Christian Rose – inlay photography
- Peter Simon – photography
- Ian Stewart – piano on "Rock and Roll"
- Laurens Van Houten – photography
- Chris Walter – photography
- Baron Wolman – photography
- Neil Zlozower – photography

== Charts ==
=== Weekly charts ===
Chart (2007–2008)	Peak position
Argentinian Albums (CAPIF)	11
Australian Albums (ARIA)	8
Austrian Albums (Ö3 Austria)	4
Belgian Albums (Ultratop Flanders)	15
Belgian Albums (Ultratop Wallonia)	18
Canadian Albums (Billboard)	7
Danish Albums (Hitlisten)	9
Dutch Albums (Album Top 100)	15
Finnish Albums (Suomen virallinen lista)	10
French Albums (SNEP)	100
German Albums (Offizielle Top 100)	4
Hungarian Albums (MAHASZ)	40
Irish Albums (IRMA)	3
Italian Albums (FIMI)	9
Japanese Albums (Oricon)	7
Mexican Albums (Top 100 Mexico)	38
New Zealand Albums (RMNZ)	1
Norwegian Albums (VG-lista)	1
Polish Albums (OLiS)	24
Portuguese Albums (AFP)	12
Scottish Albums (Official Charts)	5
Spanish Albums (Promusicae)	15
Swedish Albums (Sverigetopplistan)	17
Swiss Albums (Schweizer Hitparade)	5
UK Albums (Official Charts)	4
US Billboard 200	7
US Top Hard Rock Albums (Billboard)	1
US Top Rock Albums (Billboard)	2

=== Year-end charts ===
Chart (2007)	Position
Australian Albums (ARIA)	50
Dutch Albums (Album Top 100)	82
New Zealand Albums (RMNZ)	1
Swedish Albums (Sverigetopplistan)	81
Swiss Albums (Schweizer Hitparade)	32
UK Albums (OCC)	17
Chart (2008)	Position
Austrian Albums (Ö3 Austria)	52
Belgian Albums (Ultratop Flanders)	68
Belgian Albums (Ultratop Wallonia)	66
Canadian Albums (Billboard)	20
German Albums (Offizielle Top 100)	44
Swiss Albums (Schweizer Hitparade)	72
UK Albums (OCC)	158
US Billboard 200	31
US Top Rock Albums (Billboard)	9
Chart (2010)	Position
UK Albums (OCC)	155
Chart (2017)	Position
US Top Rock Albums (Billboard)	42
Chart (2018)	Position
US Billboard 200	156
US Top Rock Albums (Billboard)	23
Chart (2019)	Position
US Top Rock Albums (Billboard)	42
Chart (2020)	Position
US Top Rock Albums (Billboard)	76
Chart (2021)	Position
US Top Rock Albums (Billboard)	91

== Certifications ==
Region	Certification	Certified units/sales
Australia (ARIA)	2× Platinum	140,000^{^}
Austria (IFPI Austria)	Gold	10,000^{*}
Belgium (BRMA)	Gold	15,000^{*}
Canada (Music Canada)	3× Platinum	300,000^{^}
Denmark (IFPI Danmark)	Gold	15,000^{^}
Finland (Musiikkituottajat)	Gold	18,716
France (SNEP)	Platinum	100,000^{*}
Germany (BVMI)	3× Gold	300,000^{^}
Ireland (IRMA)	3× Platinum	45,000^{^}
Italy (FIMI)	Platinum	60,000^{*}
Japan (RIAJ)	Gold	100,000^{^}
New Zealand (RMNZ)	3× Platinum	45,000^{^}
Poland (ZPAV)	Platinum	20,000^{*}
Switzerland (IFPI Switzerland)	Gold	15,000^{^}
United Kingdom (BPI)	4× Platinum	1,200,000^{‡}
United States (RIAA)	2× Platinum	1,000,000^{^}
Summaries
Europe (IFPI)	Platinum	1,000,000^{*}
^{*} Sales figures based on certification alone.^{^} Shipments figures based on certification alone.^{‡} Sales+streaming figures based on certification alone.

== Accolades ==
Accolades for Mothership
Publication	Country	Accolade	Year	Rank
Classic Rock	UK	Top 20 Reissues of 2007	2007	2
