= Great Zeppelin: A Tribute to Led Zeppelin =

Live album of cover songs by Great White
- Released: 1998
- Recorded: December 16, 1996
- Venues: Galaxy Theatre, Santa Ana, California
- Genre: Hard rock
- Length: 76:11
- Label: Axe Killer

Great White chronology
Rock Me (1997)	Great Zeppelin: A Tribute to Led Zeppelin (1998)	Gallery (1999)

Great White Salutes Led Zeppelin album cover

Professional ratings
Review scores
Source	Rating
AllMusic	2/5 stars
Collector's Guide to Heavy Metal	3/10

Great Zeppelin: A Tribute to Led Zeppelin is a cover album released by the American hard rock band Great White in 1998, dedicated to songs of Led Zeppelin. It was recorded live in a concert that took place at The Galaxy Theatre of Santa Ana, California in December 1996 and released by the French label Axe Killer. The American edition was issued by Deadline Records in 1999. Deadline Records also issued a very rare vinyl version of the album in 1999, omitting 4 tracks due to time limitations of vinyl. Songs from this album appear on many compilations and also on re-issues of older albums as bonus tracks. The album was re-issued in 2005 by the Canadian label Legacy, with the title Great White Salutes Led Zeppelin. The entire album appears also on Great White's double-CD compilation A Double Dose issued by Deadline Music in 2005, along with the album of covers Recover.

In 2021 former vocalist Jack Russell released a sequel album titled "Great Zeppelin II" with his current band "Jack Russell's Great White"

== Track listing ==
1. "In the Light" (John Paul Jones, Jimmy Page, Robert Plant) – 6:06
2. "Living Loving Maid (She's Just a Woman)" (Page, Plant) – 3:30
3. "Ramble On" (Page, Plant) – 5:11
4. "Since I've Been Loving You" (Jones, Page, Plant) – 6:44
5. "No Quarter" (Jones, Page, Plant) – 8:02
6. "Tangerine" (Page) – 3:05
7. "Going to California" (Page, Plant) – 4:13
8. "Thank You" (Page, Plant) – 4:37
9. "D'yer Mak'er" (John Bonham, Jones, Page, Plant) – 4:44
10. "All My Love" (Jones, Plant) – 6:12
11. "Immigrant Song" (Page, Plant) – 2:21
12. "When the Levee Breaks" (Bonham, Jones, Memphis Minnie, Page, Plant) – 6:51
13. "The Rover" (Page, Plant) – 6:00
14. "Stairway to Heaven" (Page, Plant) – 8:35

== Personnel ==
- Jack Russell – vocals
- Mark Kendall – guitar
- Michael Lardie – guitar, keyboards
- Sean McNabb – bass
- Audie Desbrow – drums
