= In the Name of My Father – The Zepset – Live from Electric Ladyland =

Studio album by The Jason Bonham Band
- Released: April 1, 1997
- Recorded: June 17, 1996, Electric Lady Studios, New York City, New York, United States
- Genre: Hard rock
- Length: 71:03
- Label: Epic

The Jason Bonham Band chronology
In the Name of My Father – The Zepset – Live from Electric Ladyland (1997)	When You See the Sun (1997)

In the Name of My Father – The Zepset – Live from Electric Ladyland is a recorded album by Jason Bonham, released in 1997 under the name The Jason Bonham Band. The album consists entirely of cover versions of various songs by English rock group Led Zeppelin, as a tribute to the band's drummer, and Bonham's late father, John Bonham.

The album evolved after Bonham's band began performing Led Zeppelin songs at their live shows. Bonham would occasionally tape a show to listen to, and impressed with the results, he decided to record a set live in-studio at Electric Lady Studios in New York City. All proceeds of the album were donated to the John Bonham Memorial Motorcycle Camp and the Big Sisters of Los Angeles.

== Track listing ==
1. "In the Evening" (John Paul Jones, Jimmy Page, and Robert Plant) – 7:13
2. "Ramble On" (Page and Plant) – 5:35
3. "The Song Remains the Same" (Page and Plant) – 5:45
4. "What Is and What Should Never Be" (Page and Plant) – 5:15
5. "The Ocean" (John Bonham, Jones, Page, and Plant) – 4:47
6. "Since I've Been Loving You" (Jones, Page, and Plant) – 7:53
7. "Communication Breakdown" (Bonham, Page, and Plant) – 4:57
8. "Ten Years Gone" (Page and Plant) – 7:43
9. "The Rain Song" (Page and Plant) – 2:25
10. "Whole Lotta Love" (encore medley) (Bonham, Willie Dixon, Jones, Page, and Plant) – 19:22

== Personnel ==
- Jason Bonham – drums, vocals
- Tony Catania – guitar
- John Smithson – bass guitar, keyboards
- Chas West – vocals
