= Led Zeppelin European Tour 1973 =

1973 concert tour by Led Zeppelin

Europe 1973
- Tour by Led Zeppelin
- Poster for Led Zeppelin's concert at Munich, used to help promote its 1973 European tour
- Location: Europe
- Associated album: Houses of the Holy
- Start date: 2 March 1973
- End date: 2 April 1973
- No. of shows: 23 scheduled, 21 performed

Led Zeppelin concert chronology
- United Kingdom 1972/1973; Europe 1973; North America 1973

Led Zeppelin's 1973 European Tour was a concert tour of Europe by the English rock band. The tour commenced on 2 March and concluded on 2 April 1973.

This tour began four weeks after Led Zeppelin's previous tour of the United Kingdom. It is notable for the crowd violence which occurred at some shows, with concerts at Marseille and Lille being canceled as a result of riots by fans which had taken place at the band's earlier performances in France.

Some critics consider Led Zeppelin to have been at their technical peak during this tour, which took place shortly before the release of their fifth album. Several tracks from this album were performed on the tour, namely "Over the Hills and Far Away", "Dancing Days", "The Song Remains the Same", "The Rain Song" and "The Ocean".

== Tour set list ==
The fairly typical set list for the tour was:

1. "Rock and Roll" (Page, Plant, Jones, Bonham)
2. "Over the Hills and Far Away" (Page, Plant)
3. "Out on the Tiles" (intro) (Page, Plant, Bonham) / "Black Dog" (Page, Plant, Jones)
4. "Misty Mountain Hop" (Jones, Page, Plant)
5. "Since I've Been Loving You" (Page, Plant, Jones)
6. "Dancing Days" (Page, Plant)
7. "Bron-Yr-Aur Stomp" (Page, Plant, Jones)
8. "The Song Remains the Same" (Page, Plant)
9. "The Rain Song" (Page, Plant)
10. "Dazed and Confused" (Page)
11. "Stairway to Heaven" (Page, Plant)
12. "Whole Lotta Love" (Bonham, Dixon, Jones, Page, Plant)

Encores (variations of the following list):

- "Heartbreaker" (Bonham, Page, Plant)
- "The Ocean" (Bonham, Jones, Page, Plant) (Played on 6 and 21 March)
- "What Is and What Should Never Be" (Page, Plant) (on 11 March only)

There were some set list substitutions, variations, and order switches during the tour.

== Tour dates ==
Date	City	Country	Venue
2 March 1973	Copenhagen	Denmark	K.B. Hallen
4 March 1973	Gothenburg	Sweden	Scandinavium
6 March 1973	Stockholm	Sweden	Kungliga tennishallen
14 March 1973	Nuremberg	West Germany	Wiener Messehalle
16 March 1973	Vienna	Austria	Wiener Stadthalle
17 March 1973	Munich	West Germany	Olympiahalle
19 March 1973	West Berlin	West Germany	Deutschlandhalle
21 March 1973	Hamburg	West Germany	Musikhalle
22 March 1973	Essen	West Germany	Grugahalle
24 March 1973	Offenburg	West Germany	Ortenauhalle
26 March 1973	Lyon	France	Palais des Sports de Gerland
27 March 1973	Nancy	France	Parc des Expositions
~~29 March 1973~~	~~Marseille~~	France	
~~31 March 1973~~	~~Lille~~	France	
1 April 1973	Saint-Ouen	France	Centre Sportif
2 April 1973	Saint-Ouen	France	Centre Sportif
