= Kashmir: Symphonic Led Zeppelin =

1997 studio album inspired by Lwed Zeppelin

Studio album arranged by Jaz Coleman and performed by The London Philharmonic Orchestra
- Released: October 21, 1997
- Genre: Symphonic rock
- Length: 72:11
- Label: POINT Music (Polygram)
- Producer: Jaz Coleman, Youth

Professional ratings
Review scores
Source	Rating
Allmusic	3/5 stars
Uncut	4/5 stars

Kashmir: Symphonic Led Zeppelin is an instrumental album inspired by Led Zeppelin songs. The music was arranged by Jaz Coleman, and performed by the London Philharmonic Orchestra under Peter Scholes.

== Track listing ==
Track listing for Kashmir: Symphonic Led Zeppelin
#	Title	Time	Originally appears on
1	"Dawn at the Great Pyramid"	3:33	New song
2	"Kashmir"	7:54	Physical Graffiti
3	"The Battle of Evermore"	8:10	fourth album
4	"Stairway to Heaven"	10:40	fourth album
5	"When the Levee Breaks"	7:15	fourth album
6	"Going to California"	10:24	fourth album
7	"Friends"	5:40	Led Zeppelin III
8	"All My Love"	10:35	In Through the Out Door
9	"Kulu Valley" (Ambient Remix)	7:42	New song
