= Houses of the Holy (disambiguation) =

Houses of the Holy is the fifth studio album by Led Zeppelin.

Houses of the Holy may also refer to:

- "Houses of the Holy" (song), a song by Led Zeppelin from Physical Graffiti
- "Houses of the Holy" (Supernatural), an episode of Supernatural
