= The Boyz (American band) =

American hard rock band

The Boyz was an American hard rock band based in Los Angeles, California, established in 1975 by Michael White and managed by Kim Fowley.

The line-up included:

- Michael White (vocals): a future member of L.A. Rocks, and later credited as being the original vocalist in an early incarnation of Mötley Crüe and the previous Nikki Sixx band London. He later formed Michael White & The White, a Led Zeppelin tribute band.
- Mick Brown (drums)
- George Lynch (guitar)
- Monte Zufelt (bass)

The Boyz disbanded in 1977-1978 with Michael White forming L.A. Rocks with Randy Piper (W.A.S.P.) and then joined Nikki Sixx and Lizzie Grey band London as the original lead vocalist. After leaving London, Michael White formed his solo group entitled Michael White & the White with guitarist Lanny Cordola (of Giuffria, House of Lords). George Lynch, Mick Brown, then Rocky Romano, Chap Cooper, John Wilson. Monte Zufelt carried on as Xciter with vocalist Greg Sanford.
