= The Music Remains the Same: A Tribute to Led Zeppelin =

The Music Remains the Same (A Tribute to Led Zeppelin)

Compilation album by Various Artists
- Released: 25 November 2002
- Genre: Heavy metal, power metal, hard rock
- Length: 57:55
- Label: Locomotive Music

The Music Remains the Same (A Tribute to Led Zeppelin) is a tribute album of Led Zeppelin songs. It was released on 25 November 2002 by Spanish record label Locomotive Music.

== Track listing ==
1. "Kashmir" – Angra
2. "Dazed and Confused" – Blaze
3. "The Rover" – Primal Fear
4. "Babe I'm Gonna Leave You" – Doro
5. "Rock and Roll" – Elegy
6. "Communication Breakdown" – Tierra Santa
7. "No Quarter" – Grave Digger
8. "Black Dog" – Masterplan
9. "Immigrant Song" – Consortium Project
10. "Whole Lotta Love" – Mägo De Oz
11. "Good Times Bad Times" – Axxis
12. "Stairway to Heaven" – White Skull
