= Soundstage: Robert Plant and the Strange Sensation =

Video by Robert Plant and the Strange Sensation
- Released: October 2006
- Recorded: 2005
- Genre: Hard rock, world music
- Length: 1:06:00, 1:21:00 with bonus features
- Label: Zoë Records

Soundstage: Robert Plant and the Strange Sensation is the first live DVD by Robert Plant and the Strange Sensation, featuring a performance filmed for the Soundstage television series in Chicago on September 16, 2005, in addition to bonus features from prior to the founding of the Strange Sensation. It was released in October 2006 in regions 1 and 2.

== Reception ==
Hal Horowitz of AllMusic gave the album four out of five stars, praising both the musicianship and the technical aspects of the release writing, "The material from the 2005 album the group was touring to support is a taut combination of prog, world, folk, and rock that twists and turns and sometimes shifts to experimental but ultimately stays on terra firma. The Surround Sound is impressive and only the overly busy camera work -- few shots last for more than five seconds and the handheld, angular approach gets old fast -- detracts, if only slightly, from an exciting, stirring, and energetic gig."

== Track listing ==
1. "No Quarter"
2. "Shine It All Around"
3. "Black Dog"
4. "Freedom Fries"
5. "Four Sticks"
6. "Tin Pan Valley"
7. "Gallow's Pole"
8. "The Enchanter"
9. "Whole Lotta Love"

== Bonus features ==
- Two bonus songs from the performance: Covers of "Hey Joe" and "Girl from the North Country"
- Dolby Digital Surround 5.1, DTS 5.1
- Videos for "29 Palms" and "Morning Dew"
- Top of the Pops performances of "29 Palms" and "Big Log"
- Jukebox facility
