= Farouk El Safi =

Arabic drummer

Farouk El Safi is a master of Arabic drumming (bendir, daf and others). He is best known for his work with Page and Plant and many of the greats of arabic music, over the last forty years. Farouk still records, directs/plays many Zaffa and other live roles, from his home in London.

Amongst western audiences, Farouk is best known as the bendir/daf player, on No Quarter: Jimmy Page and Robert Plant Unledded album and, live for their legendary MTV Unplugged performance. He is the proud owner of a platinum record, given in recognition of his part in the million-plus seller, by the former Led Zeppelin.

Farouk is a classically trained musician, with a career spanning more than forty years, he still loves to record and perform his music. With a name of high renown in Middle Eastern circles, he is well known especially in Europe and throughout the Middle East. Farouk El Safi has also collaborated with many of the greats in Middle Eastern music, including: Farid Al Atrache, Warda, Sabah, Walid Tawfik, Ragheb Alama, Kazem al-Saher & Hani Shaker. He has performed live on countless occasions, including command performances for heads of state in Egypt, Tunisia and Belgium.
