= No Quarter: Jimmy Page and Robert Plant Unledded =

No Quarter: Jimmy Page & Robert Plant Unledded

Live album by Page and Plant
- Released: 7 November 1994
- Recorded: August 1994
- Venues: Jemaa el-Fnaa in Marrakesh, Morocco; Slate quarry near Corris and Dolgoch Falls, Wales; London, England
- Length: 79:32
- Label: Atlantic
- Producers: Jimmy Page, Robert Plant

Page and Plant chronology
No Quarter: Jimmy Page & Robert Plant Unledded (1994)	Walking into Clarksdale (1998)

Robert Plant chronology
Fate of Nations (1993)	No Quarter: Jimmy Page & Robert Plant Unledded (1994)	Walking into Clarksdale (1998)

Jimmy Page chronology
Coverdale•Page (1993)	No Quarter: Jimmy Page & Robert Plant Unledded (1994)	Walking into Clarksdale (1998)

Professional ratings
Review scores
Source	Rating
AllMusic	4/5 stars
Music Week	4/5 stars

No Quarter is a live album by Jimmy Page and Robert Plant, both formerly of English rock band Led Zeppelin. It was released by Atlantic Records on 7 November 1994. The long-awaited reunion between Jimmy Page and Robert Plant occurred on a 90-minute "UnLedded" MTV project, recorded in Morocco, Wales and London.

The reunion event notably lacked the presence of bassist and keyboardist, John Paul Jones, thus deviating from a comprehensive band reunion. Jones remained uninformed of this reunion by his former bandmates. Subsequently, Jones conveyed his discontent regarding the decision of Plant and Page to christen the album after "No Quarter", a track predominantly attributed to him.

In addition to acoustic renditions, the album features a reworking of Led Zeppelin songs featuring a Moroccan string band and Egyptian orchestra supplementing a core group of rock and roll musicians, along with four Middle-Eastern and Moroccan-influenced songs: "City Don't Cry", "Yallah" (or "The Truth Explodes"), "Wonderful One", and "Wah Wah".

Several years later, Plant reflected on the collaboration very positively:

The will and the eagerness with Unledded were fantastic and [Page] was really creative. Jimmy and I went in a room and it was back. His riffs were spectacular. To take it as far as we did, and the tour we did – it's one of the most ambitious and mind-altering experiences.

== Legacy ==
In July 2014, Guitar World placed No Quarter on their "Superunknown: 50 Iconic Albums That Defined 1994" list.

== Track listing ==
All tracks are written by Jimmy Page and Robert Plant, except where noted. Track 10 "Wah Wah" is an extra track not included on the original US and Canada LP, CD, and Cassette 14 track releases, but is included on most other countries releases.

Original version (1994)
No.	Title	Writer(s)	Original release	Length
1.	"Nobody's Fault but Mine"		Presence (1976)	4:06
2.	"Thank You"		Led Zeppelin II (1969)	5:47
3.	"No Quarter"	John Paul Jones/Page/Plant	Houses of the Holy (1973)	3:45
4.	"Friends"		Led Zeppelin III (1970)	4:37
5.	"Yallah"		New song	4:59
6.	"City Don't Cry"		New song	6:08
7.	"Since I've Been Loving You"	Jones/Page/Plant	Led Zeppelin III	7:29
8.	"The Battle of Evermore"		Led Zeppelin IV (1971)	6:41
9.	"Wonderful One"		New song	4:57
10.	"Wah Wah" (not on the U.S. release)		New song	3:59
11.	"That's the Way"		Led Zeppelin III	5:35
12.	"Gallows Pole"	Traditional arr. Page/Plant	Led Zeppelin III	4:09
13.	"Four Sticks"		Led Zeppelin IV	4:52
14.	"Kashmir"	John Bonham/Page/Plant	Physical Graffiti (1975)	12:27
Total length:				79:32

For the tenth anniversary, the album was re-released with a different cover and altered track listing. "Thank You" was cut, "City Don't Cry" and "Wonderful One" appeared in substantially edited versions, and "The Rain Song" and "Wah Wah" were added. In addition, "Yallah" was retitled, and several other tracks had minor alterations to their running times. The new running order was as follows:

2004 reissue
No.	Title	Writer(s)	Original release	Length
1.	"It's Nobody's Fault but Mine"		Presence (1976)	3:57
2.	"No Quarter"	John Paul Jones/Page/Plant	Houses of the Holy (1973)	3:47
3.	"Friends"		Led Zeppelin III (1970)	4:35
4.	"The Truth Explodes" (formerly known as "Yallah")		New song	4:42
5.	"The Rain Song"		Houses of the Holy (1973)	7:29
6.	"City Don't Cry" (edit)		New song	3:15
7.	"Since I've Been Loving You"	Jones/Page/Plant	Led Zeppelin III	7:28
8.	"The Battle of Evermore"		Led Zeppelin IV (1971)	6:40
9.	"Wonderful One" (edit)		New song	3:23
10.	"Wah Wah"		New song	5:24
11.	"That's the Way"		Led Zeppelin III	5:37
12.	"Gallows Pole"	Traditional arr. Page/Plant	Led Zeppelin III	4:17
13.	"Four Sticks"		Led Zeppelin IV	4:57
14.	"Kashmir"		Physical Graffiti (1975)	12:36
Total length:				75:38

"Gallows Pole" and "Wonderful One" were released as singles.

All songs recorded in London except "City Don't Cry", "Wah Wah" and "Yallah" recorded in Morocco; "No Quarter", "It's Nobody's Fault but Mine" and "When the Levee Breaks" recorded in Wales.

== DVD release ==
Cover to the DVD

The tenth anniversary of the recording of the Unledded concerts was commemorated by a DVD release of additional songs, a bonus interview, a montage of images from Morocco, the band's performance of "Black Dog" for Dick Clark's American Music Awards and the music video for "Most High" from the Walking into Clarksdale album. The songs included on the DVD release not included on either CD release were "What Is and What Should Never Be" and "When the Levee Breaks". To compensate for their absence from the Live Aid DVD release, Plant and Page donated a portion of their proceeds to the Band Aid Trust.

=== DVD track listing ===
1. "No Quarter" (Jones/Page/Plant)
2. "Thank You"
3. "What Is And What Should Never Be"
4. "The Battle of Evermore"
5. "Gallows Pole" (Traditional arr. Page/Plant)
6. "Nobody's Fault but Mine"
7. "City Don't Cry"
8. "The Truth Explodes" (formerly known as "Yallah") (Page/Plant)
9. "Wah Wah"
10. "When the Levee Breaks"
11. "Wonderful One"
12. "Since I've Been Loving You" (Jones/Page/Plant)
13. "The Rain Song"
14. "That's the Way"
15. "Four Sticks"
16. "Friends"
17. "Kashmir" (Page/Plant/Bonham)

Bonus material

- "Black Dog" (performed at the ABC American Music Awards)
- Moroccan Montage
- "Most High" music video
- Interview

== Personnel ==
The songs were recorded in Marrakech, Morocco (spring 1994), on top of a waste tip at Aberllefenni quarries (17 August 1994), in a forest in Wales and in front of an invited audience at London Weekend Television studios over two nights in August, 1994.

- Robert Plant – vocals
- Jimmy Page – acoustic and electric guitars, mandolin

Musicians in Marrakech (except on "Yallah")

- Brahim El Balkani
- Hassan El Arfaoui
- El Mahjoub El Mathoun
- Abdelkah Eddahmane

London and Wales band (except on "No Quarter", "Wonderful One")

- Charlie Jones – bass guitar, percussion
- Michael Lee – drums, percussion
- Porl Thompson – guitar, banjo
- Jim Sutherland – mandolin, bodhrán
- Nigel Eaton – Hurdy-gurdy
- Ed Shearmur – Hammond organ, orchestral arrangements for English and Egyptian Ensemble (London only)
- Najma Akhtar – vocals (London only)

Egyptian Ensemble (London)

Percussion

- Hossam Ramzy – doholla, musical director for Egyptian Ensemble
- Ali Abdel Salem – duf, bendir
- Farid Khashab – bendir, reque
- Farouk El Safi – duf, bendir
- Ibrahim Abdel Khaliq – bendir, mirwas, finger cymbals

Strings

- Waeil Abu Bakr – soloist
- Bahig Mikhaeel
- Hanafi Soliman
- Amin Abdel Azim

Also

- Bashir Abdel Aal – ney
- Abdel Salam Kheir – oud

London Metropolitan Orchestra (London)

Violins

- Rosemary Furniss
- David Juritz
- Rita Manning
- Elizabeth Layton
- Ian Humphries
- Perry Montague-Mason
- Mark Berrow
- Pauline Lowbury
- Clare Thompson
- Jessica O'Leary
- David Ogden
- Peter Hanson
- Jeremy Williams
- Cathy Thompson
- Ed Coxon
- Anne Morlee
- Harriet Davies

Violas

- Andrew Brown
- Rusen Gunes
- Andrew Parker
- Bill Hawkes
- Nicholas Pendlebery
- John Jezard
- Janet Atkins

Celli

- Caroline Dale
- Cathy Giles
- Stephen Milne
- Ben Chappell
- Jonathan Tunnel

Also

- Sandy Lawson – didjeridu
- Storme Watson – didjeridu

=== Production ===
- Jimmy Page – producer
- Robert Plant – producer
- Mike Gregovich – engineer, mixing
- Colin(Alfie)Barton - recording engineer, Morrocco
- Jon Moon - recording engineer, Wales
- Martin Meissonnier – percussion pre-production on "Yallah (The Truth Explodes)" and "Wonderful One"
- Andy Earl – photography
- Cally – design
- Kevin Shirley – remixed stereo and surround sound for 2004 edition

== Accolades ==
Publication	Country	Accolade	Year	Rank
Metal Hammer	UK	Metal Hammer Albums of '94	1994	14
Mojo	UK	The 25 Best Albums of 1994	1994	11
Raw	UK	Raw Albums of the Year	1994	14
Mojo	UK	Mojo 100 Modern Classics	2001	42

== Charts ==
=== Weekly charts ===
Chart (1994–1996)	Peak position
Australian Albums (ARIA)	2
Austrian Albums Chart	27
Canadian RPM Top 100 Chart	3
Dutch Albums Chart	33
French Albums Chart	8
German Albums Chart	18
New Zealand RIANZ Top 50 Albums Chart	13
Swedish Albums Chart	10
Swiss Albums Chart	16
UK Albums Chart	7
US Billboard The 200 Albums Chart	4

==== Year-end charts ====
Chart (1994)	Rank
Australian Albums (ARIA)	54

=== Video ===
Chart (1994)	Peak position
US Billboard Comprehensive Music Video Chart	2
Chart (1995)	Peak position
US Billboard Top Music Video Chart	4
US Billboard Top VHS Sales Chart	15
Hungarian MAHASZ Top 20 DVDs Chart	3
Australian ARIA Music DVD Chart	

== Certifications ==
Certifications and sales for No Quarter: Jimmy Page and Robert Plant Unledded (album)
Region	Certification	Certified units/sales
Australia (ARIA)	Gold	35,000^{^}
Canada (Music Canada)	Platinum	100,000^{^}
Japan (RIAJ)	Gold	100,000^{^}
United Kingdom (BPI)	Gold	100,000^{^}
United States (RIAA)	Platinum	1,000,000^{^}
^{^} Shipments figures based on certification alone.

Certifications and sales for No Quarter: Jimmy Page and Robert Plant Unledded (video album)
Region	Certification	Certified units/sales
Argentina (CAPIF)	Platinum	60,000^{^}
Australia (ARIA)	Platinum	15,000^{^}
United Kingdom (BPI)	Gold	25,000^{^}
United States (RIAA)	Platinum	100,000^{^}
^{^} Shipments figures based on certification alone.
