= Jamie's Cryin' =

Single by Van Halen

from the album Van Halen
- A-side: "On Fire" (JP)
- B-side: "I'm the One"
- Released: July 1978
- Recorded: 1977
- Studio: Sunset Sound Recorders, Hollywood
- Genre: Hard rock
- Length: 3:30
- Label: Warner Bros.
- Songwriters: Michael Anthony; David Lee Roth; Alex Van Halen; Edward Van Halen
- Producer: Ted Templeman

Van Halen singles chronology
"Runnin' with the Devil" (1978)	"Jamie's Cryin'" (1978)	"Ain't Talkin' 'bout Love" (1978)

Music videos
- "Jamie's Cryin'" on YouTube

"Jamie's Cryin'" is a song written by the band Van Halen that was first released on the band's 1978 debut album. It was subsequently released as the third single from the album but did not chart. It has also been released on a Van Halen compilation album and was sampled for Tone Loc's 1988 song "Wild Thing".

== Writing and recording ==
Some of the songs on Van Halen were written before the band was signed and appeared on a demo the band prepared to secure their contract. "Jamie's Cryin'" was written later, after the band was signed and while they were recording the album. Guitarist Eddie Van Halen played the riff for the song and producer Ted Templeman and lead singer David Lee Roth thought it had potential for a song that could be a single from the album. Roth remembered that "We heard Edward fooling around with his guitar between takes, and we yelled 'Hey man, that's just what we need on the album.'" According to Templeman, when it was time to record the song they had most of the melody completed, but not the melody for the bridge and none of the lyrics were written. Roth had the idea to write the lyrics about a high school romance that didn't last. Templeman believes he got the idea from a two-note lick Eddie Van Halen played in the song that sounded like someone crying.

Templeman stated that:

At first I was worried that the lyrics were too reminiscent of a fifties white pop breakup song, but eventually I realized Dave's lyric was a lot like those wonderful Holland-Dozier-Holland Motown tracks like "Where Did Our Love Go?" Those songs sounded happy, but were about heart-rendering breakups. The way it came off was in keeping with that heavy-metal-with-a-smile, upbeat sound, this teenage thing. It ended up being one of the singles off the record.

Roth has claimed that in addition to writing the lyrics he also structured the guitar solo for the song by singing it out.

As with other songs on Van Halen that did not use vibrato (e.g., "Runnin' with the Devil", "You Really Got Me"), Eddie Van Halen played his rhythm guitar part on "Jamie's Cryin'" on an Ibanez Destroyer.

"Jamie's Cryin'" is one of the few songs on Van Halen on which overdubs were used.

== Lyrics and music ==
Classic Rock critic Dave Everley described the lyrics to "Jamie's Cryin'" as being "about the aftermath of a one-night stand that’s surprisingly sympathetic." The Vincennes Sun-Commercial said that it "told the age-old story of how a girl falls in love, but knows the guy only wants a one night stand."

Roth describes "Jamie's Cryin'" as a pop song. Roth stated to the Cleveland Plain Dealer that "I don't consider it bubblegum. It ain't. It's a pop tune. I grew up with that stuff, with the Dave Clark Five and the Beatles." He also described the song as a "cosmic cha cha" and said that "We're the band that sold a Ricky Ricardo rumba in 'Jamie's Cryin'."

The song's hook is similar to that on the Kiss song "Christine Sixteen". Eddie Van Halen and drummer Alex Van Halen had played on the demo for "Christine Sixteen."

In choosing Eddie Van Halen as the sixth greatest "pick squealer" of all time, the staff of Guitar World said that "With his aggressive pick attack, Ed sounds almost as if he’s using some weird wah-wah effect when he pinches the strings in the hyperboogie riffs of 'I’m the One' and 'Jamie’s Crying.'" Joe Charupakorn noted that on the guitar solo Van Halen "could have easily wailed, but instead chose to the play thematically and appropriately to maintain the song's vibe." Charupakorn also noted that "the solo makes use of question-and-answer phrasing that is similar in structure to the intro riff."

== Critical reception ==
The Morning Call critic Len Righi noted that the song was getting significant radio airplay before the single came out and said that "its sinewy beat, piercing guitar fills and crisp harmonies behind David Lee Roth's husky vocal combine to produce powerful rock." Ultimate Classic Rock critic Annie Zaleski said that "Jamie's Cryin'" "proved that hard rock could be poppy and melodic." Fellow Ultimate Classic Rock critic Matt Wardlaw said that he loved its "energy and the attitude and the power." Kiss bassist Gene Simmons stated that he loves the song because of the hook. Guitar World contributor Henry Yates praised the "often-overlooked rhythm chops that underpinned the stalking groove of 'Jamie’s Cryin.'" Allmusic critic Stephen Thomas Erlewine described it as a "full-fledged anthem" and a song "that changed rock & roll and still [is a] monolithic slab of rock to this day." Fresno Bee critic Carol J. Castaneda said that the song demonstrated that "the band's rock 'n' roll talents are indisputable." Guitar World editor-in-chief Brad Tolinski and Chris Gill noted that the song featured "Van Halen's catchiest melody to date" and was a "successful attempt at penning a radio-friendly hit."

Although "Jamie's Cryin'" did not chart when it was released as a single, Eddie Van Halen was disappointed that their cover of "You Really Got Me" was chosen as the lead single from the album over "Jamie's Cryin'". He stated that "It kind of bummed me out that Ted [Templeman] wanted our first single to be someone else's tune. I would have maybe picked 'Jamie's Cryin', just because it was our own."

== Other releases ==
"Jamie's Cryin'" was one of five songs included on a sampler EP that Warner Bros. Records put out in advance of the release Van Halen (along with "Runnin' with the Devil", "You Really Got Me", "Eruption" and "Ice Cream Man"). The band also shot a music video for the song at the Whisky a Go Go, along with videos for the first two singles from the album.

In Japan, "Jamie's Cryin'" was the B-side to the band's 1978 single "On Fire".

"Jamie's Cryin'" was included on the 2004 Van Halen compilation album The Best of Both Worlds.

"Jamie's Cryin'" is one of the songs included on Guitar Hero: Van Halen.

Roth sang a version of "Jamie's Cryin'" on the 2006 tribute album Strummin' with the Devil: The Southern Side of Van Halen.

== Sampling ==
Tone Loc sampled "Jamie's Cryin'" for his 1988 song "Wild Thing". Producer Matt Dike incorporated parts of the intro of "Jamie's Cryin'" as well as some guitar licks into "Wild Thing" in order to give it a "West Coast vibe." Van Halen did not originally give permission to sample the song and sued over it, but eventually an out-of-court settlement was reached, apparently for $180,000.
