= Strummin' with the Devil: The Southern Side of Van Halen =

Strummin' with the Devil

Compilation album by David Lee Roth and various artists
- Released: June 6, 2006
- Genre: Bluegrass, country rock, blues-rock
- Label: CMH
- Producer: John Jorgenson

Strummin' with the Devil: The Southern Side of Van Halen is a tribute album released on June 6, 2006. It features artists (including original Van Halen frontman David Lee Roth) performing covers of Van Halen songs of the Roth era, done in bluegrass-style music. Roth appeared on several late night talkshows to promote the album.

Professional ratings
Review scores
Source	Rating
Allmusic	2.5/5 stars

== Track listing ==
All songs written by Michael Anthony, David Lee Roth, Eddie Van Halen and Alex Van Halen, except 11 written by John Brim.

No.	Title	Artist(s)	Length
1.	"Jump"	David Lee Roth featuring The John Jorgenson Band	4:35
2.	"Jamie's Cryin'"	David Lee Roth featuring The John Jorgenson Band	5:32
3.	"I'll Wait"	Blue Highway	6:17
4.	"Runnin' with the Devil"	The John Cowan Band	3:39
5.	"Dance the Night Away"	Mountain Heart	3:16
6.	"Ain't Talkin' 'Bout Love"	Iron Horse	4:08
7.	"Hot for Teacher"	David Grisman, Sam Grisman, Monroe Grisman	4:42
8.	"Feel Your Love Tonight"	Tony Trischka, Dudley Connell, Marshall Wilborn, Dave McLaughlin	3:26
9.	"Panama"	Cornbread Red	3:56
10.	"Unchained"	Iron Horse	3:56
11.	"Ice Cream Man"	Larry Cordle and Lonesome Standard Time	3:35
12.	"And the Cradle Will Rock"	The John Jorgenson Band	3:41
13.	"Could This Be Magic?"	The Nashville Bluegrass Band	2:51
14.	"Eruption"	Dennis Caplinger	1:51
15.	"Jamie's Cryin'" (Radio Edit)	David Lee Roth featuring The John Jorgenson Band	4:01

== Chart performance ==
Chart (2006)	Peak position
U.S. Billboard Top Country Albums	66
