= Wearing and Tearing =

Song by Led Zeppelin

from the album Coda
- Released: 19 November 1982
- Recorded: 21 November 1978
- Studio: Polar, Stockholm
- Genre: Hard rock
- Length: 5:31
- Label: Swan Song
- Songwriters: Jimmy Page; Robert Plant
- Producer: Jimmy Page

"Wearing and Tearing" is a song by English rock group Led Zeppelin. It is the eighth and final track on their 1982 compilation album, Coda. It was recorded at Polar Studios in Stockholm, Sweden, during the In Through the Out Door sessions on 21 November 1978.

== Release and performances ==
The origins of "Wearing and Tearing" can be traced to jams during "Dazed and Confused" earlier in the 1970s. It is notably featured in the 1972 live album How the West Was Won. Due to space constraints, "Wearing and Tearing" was one of three songs recorded at Polar Studios which were omitted from In Through the Out Door and later released on Coda, the other two being "Ozone Baby" and "Darlene". The group considered releasing it as a special commemorative single in time for their performance at the 1979 Knebworth Festival, but this plan was abandoned because of time constraints. The song was never performed at Led Zeppelin concerts, but Jimmy Page and Robert Plant played it at their Knebworth reunion in 1990.

== Critical reception ==
Led Zeppelin biographer Dave Lewis sees "Wearing and Tearing" as a statement that the group could compete with the punk bands popular at the time. Ted Drozdowsk commented that the song was "Proof that when it came to energy and aggression, punk rockers had nothing on the Zep." In a contemporary review of Coda, Kurt Loder of Rolling Stone described "Wearing and Tearing", along with "Ozone Baby" and "Darlene", as "about as wonderful as hard rock & roll gets."

== See also ==
- List of cover versions of Led Zeppelin songs – "Wearing and Tearing" entries

== Notes ==
Citations

References

- Drozdowski, Ted (7 July 2011). "Celebration Day: Jimmy Page's Top 10 Guitar Moments". gibson.com.
- Lewis, Dave (2010). Led Zeppelin: The Complete Guide To Their Music. Music Sales. ISBN 978-0857121356.
- Lewis, Dave (2003). Tight But Loose Files. Music Sales. pp. 56, 63. ISBN 978-1844490561.
