= The String Quartet =

"The String Quartet" is a short story written by Virginia Woolf and published in 1921.
