= Iron Horse (band) =

American bluegrass band

- Origin: Killen, Alabama, U.S.
- Genres: Bluegrass, rock
- Years active: 2000–present
- Label: CMH Records
- Members: Vance Henry; Ricky Rogers; Anthony Richardson; Tony Robertson

Iron Horse is an American bluegrass band from Killen, Alabama. They are known for performing and recording bluegrass cover versions of rock songs, particularly their bluegrass treatments of heavy metal songs popularized by Metallica. The band has two tracks on the tribute album Strummin' with the Devil: The Southern Side of Van Halen, which also features David Lee Roth, among other artists. They have recently been working on self-produced material and in October 2009 released an all-original Christmas project called "Small Town Christmas".

== Members ==
- Vance Henry – guitar, lead and tenor vocals
- Anthony Richardson – banjo, baritone and bass vocals
- Ricky Rogers – bassist, baritone and lead vocals
- Tony Robertson – mandolin, lead and tenor vocals

== Discography ==
=== Tribute albums ===
- 2003: Fade to Bluegrass: The Bluegrass Tribute to Metallica
- 2004: Black and Bluegrass: A Tribute to Ozzy Osbourne and Black Sabbath
- 2004: Pickin' on Modest Mouse
- 2005: Whole Lotta Bluegrass: A Bluegrass Tribute to Led Zeppelin
- 2006: Fade to Bluegrass: The Bluegrass Tribute to Metallica, Vol. 2
- 2006: Life, Birth, Blue, Grass: A Bluegrass Tribute to Black Label Society
- 2006: Strummin' With The Devil: The Southern Side of Van Halen (two tracks on a multi-artist compilation)
- 2007: The Bluegrass Tribute to The Shins
- 2007: Take Me Home: The Bluegrass Tribute to Guns N' Roses
- 2007: The Bluegrass Tribute to Classic Rock (featuring 7 songs by Iron Horse and 7 songs by Corn Bread Red)
- 2007: The Bluegrass Tribute to Modest Mouse: Something You've Never Heard Before
- 2007: The Gospel According to Hank Williams
- 2009: A Boy Named Blue: A Bluegrass Tribute to Goo Goo Dolls
- 2010: The Bluegrass Tribute to Kings of Leon
- 2010: "The Bluegrass Tribute to Kanye West's Heartless" (single)
- 2017: Pickin' On Nirvana
- 2023: Pickin' On Pearl Jam
- 2024: Pickin' On The Doors
- 2025: Pickin' On Creedence Clearwater Revival: Bluegrass Rising

=== Original material/self produced ===
- 2001: Ridin' Out The Storm
- 2005: New Tracks
- 2009: Small Town Christmas (new, all original Christmas songs)
- 2010: "Reba McEntire" (single)
- 2011: Horse & Pen
- 2018: "Classic Bluegrass Vol 1"
- 2020: "Classic Bluegrass Vol 2"
