= Michael White & the White =

American hard rock combo and occasional Led Zeppelin tribute band

Michael White & the White is an American hard rock combo and occasional Led Zeppelin cover band, formed around singer Michael White.

White started his career in 1973, when he played with Los Angeles–based the Boyz, in a line-up which included Mick Brown and George Lynch (both of later Dokken fame). He is further credited as being a vocalist in early incarnations of London and Mötley Crüe.

White formed the White in 1977 with guitarist Lanny Cordola (of Giuffria, House of Lords). The band would later include guitarist- Chap Cooper, drummer- Rocky Romano and bassist John Wilson. Since then the White has toured extensively through North America and Europe. The band received positive reviews, including from the Toronto Star, which claimed they were "remarkably similar to the legendary Led Zeppelin...combining strong visual impersonations with a solid and accurate sound."

In 1986, Robert Plant of Led Zeppelin assisted in securing White a recording contract with Atlantic Records. The debut album was recorded at Musicland Studios in Munich Germany (where Led Zeppelin recorded their Presence album) with record producer Reinhold Mack. The album was well received, earning a five "K" review from Derek Oliver of Kerrang! magazine. The album featured W.A.S.P. guitarist Randy Piper, Alan St Johns of the Billy Squier band, Bobby Chouinard of the Gary Moore band and Danny Bilan of Moxy. The White then recorded two CDs for the Griffin Music label: Michael White/The White (1990) and Michael White Plays the Music of Led Zeppelin (1994), which were later re-released as a double-album under the title A Tribute To Led Zeppelin - Studio Sessions, Volume One & Volume Two.

White has been a regular performer and guest on Toronto's Q107 rock radio station's Derringer show.

In 2005, Cleopatra Records approached White to record on a Led Zeppelin tribute album entitled Led Box, which also featured Eric Bloom of Blue Öyster Cult, Pat Travers, Joe Lynn Turner (of Rainbow), Rick Derringer, Rick Wakeman (Yes), Steve Morse (Deep Purple) and Keith Emerson (ELP).

In 2009, White created "Orchestral Zeppelin" and toured around Canada performing with volunteer orchestras in each city.
