= Thank You (Led Zeppelin song) =

1969 song by Led Zeppelin

Song by Led Zeppelin

from the album Led Zeppelin II
- Released: 22 October 1969
- Recorded: 25 June 1969
- Studio: Morgan Studios, London
- Genre: Rock
- Length: 4:49 (Note: The original US Atlantic LP lists the duration as 3:50 (the UK releases did not list the timings). The 2014 CD reissue lists the song length as 4:49.)
- Label: Atlantic
- Songwriters: Jimmy Page; Robert Plant
- Producer: Jimmy Page

"Thank You" is a song by the English rock band Led Zeppelin from their second studio album Led Zeppelin II (1969). It was written by Robert Plant and Jimmy Page, and produced by Page.

== Composition and recording ==
"Thank You" is notated in the key of D major in common time with a tempo of 76 beats per minute.

The song features a Hammond organ, played by John Paul Jones, which fades into a false ending before concluding with a crescendo roughly ten seconds later. For the recording of this track, Page played on a Vox Phantom XII 12-string guitar.

== Personnel ==
According to Jean-Michel Guesdon and Philippe Margotin:

- Robert Plant – vocals
- Jimmy Page – electric and acoustic guitars, backing vocals
- John Paul Jones – bass, organ
- John Bonham – drums

== Reception ==
In a retrospective review of Led Zeppelin II (Deluxe Edition) (2014), Michael Madden of Consequence of Sound praised the remastering of "Thank You", believing the track now sounds "mellow and well-balanced". Madden further praised the remastering, writing the track "breathes easy during the verses and ascends elsewhere in the song", along with "illuminating Page's touch and Bonham's haymakers". When reviewing the added bonus tracks of the Deluxe Edition, Madden further praised the new version of "Thank You", titled "Thank You (Backing Track)", writing the track "magnifies the song's tasteful sheen, popping with Bonham’s drums and Jones' organ, which seems to have a mind of its own."

Record producer Rick Rubin remarked on the song's structure: "The delicacy of the vocals is incredible; the acoustic guitar and the organ work together to create an otherworldly presence."

Mark Richardson of Pitchfork found "Thank You" to be "musically brilliant", and that it "mix[es] folk with proto-metal" via "chiming acoustic guitars" which "provide the contrast to the crunch in a whole new way".

== Recognition and legacy ==
In November 2010, "Thank You" was featured on Gibson's list of "10 Great Songs that Give Thanks". Rolling Stone ranked it number 29 on "The 40 Greatest Led Zeppelin Songs of All Time" in November 2012. In November 2017, "the song was ranked number 28 on Fuse's list of "35 Thank You Songs". Page and Plant recorded it for the No Quarter: Jimmy Page and Robert Plant Unledded album (1994).

== See also ==
- List of cover versions of Led Zeppelin songs § Thank You

== Sources ==
- Guesdon, Jean-Michel; Margotin, Philippe (2018). Led Zeppelin All the Songs: The Story Behind Every Track. Running Press. ISBN 978-0-316-448-67-3.
