= Hampton String Quartet =

American musical act

The Hampton String Quartet, alternately known as the Hampton Rock String Quartet, is a string quartet specializing in rock music and other popular styles using two violins, a viola and a cello. In 1998 they were nominated for a Grammy Award, and as of 2012 they were the best selling string quartet with over 1 million CDs sold in the US alone.

According to the liner notes of their 1986 debut album, What if Mozart wrote "Have Yourself a Merry Little Christmas", the quartet was formed specifically for that album in response to RCA's desire to record string quartet arrangements of mostly-secular Christmas music in a classical (Mozart) style. That album went on to sell close to a million copies and together with their following albums and CDs have made HSQ one of the largest selling string quartets in history.

Their debut album was followed in 1988 by What if Mozart Wrote "Roll Over Beethoven" and What if Mozart Wrote "Born to Be Wild" in 1989 and then What if Mozart Wrote "I Saw Mommy Kissing Santa Claus".

Following the What if Mozart... series, little was heard from the quartet until 1993, when they released an album featuring the Rolling Stones' "Sympathy for the Devil" as its title track, which subsequently was part of the debut album on the label of the cellist's music publishing company, Mona Lisa Sound. Since then, the quartet has released three additional albums through Mona Lisa Sound, HSQ Rides Again (2004), HSQ Does Christmas (Again) (2004) and Take No Prisoners (2005). Their most recent releases include an all-Beatles CD, The Off-White Album, as well as All Zeppelin.

As of 2018, their current roster consisted of Regis Iandiorio, first violin, Abe Appleman, second violin, Richard Maximoff, viola and John Reed, cello, all of whom except Appleman are original members.
