= Beauty and the Beat (Tarja album) =

2014 live album by Tarja Turunen and Mike Terrana

Video by: Tarja; Mike Terrana
- Released: 30 May 2014
- Recorded: Kongresové Centrum, Zlín, Czech Republic, 4, 5, 6 April 2013
- Genres: Opera; classical; experimental; crossover
- Label: earMUSIC
- Producers: Tarja; Mike Terrana

Tarja; Mike Terrana; chronology
Act I: Live in Rosario (2012)	Beauty and the Beat (2014)	Luna Park Ride (2015)

Beauty and the Beat is a live collaboration between Tarja Turunen and Mike Terrana.

The track listing consists of a mix of classical pieces, covers of both Queen and Led Zeppelin, songs by Tarja's previous band Nightwish, and her own songs.

On 23 April 2014, earMUSIC released a teaser trailer and the official trailer came out on 9 May.

== Background ==
The idea was conceived by Turunen, who had worked with Terrana on several projects in the past, including her first live recording, Act I: Live in Rosario. On her website, she states: "Our main goal with these kinds of concerts is that younger audiences experience the beauty and power of a symphonic orchestra and choir." Terrana's explanatory comment was, "It's obvious that I provide the BEAT and Tarja provides the BEAUTY."

== Double CD track listing ==
CD1
No.	Title	Writer(s)	Length
1.	"Concert for Violin & Oboe (Mike)"	Johann Sebastian Bach
2.	"Blute Nur (Tarja)"	Johann Sebastian Bach
3.	"Zueignung - Op. 10, No. 1 (Tarja)"	Richard Strauss
4.	"Barber of Seville (Mike)"	Gioachino Rossini
5.	"New World Symphony (Mike)"	Antonín Dvořák
6.	"Song to the Moon (Tarja)"	Antonín Dvořák
7.	"Vilja Lied (Tarja)"	Franz Lehár
8.	"O mio babbino caro (Tarja)"	Giacomo Puccini
9.	"Can-Can (Mike)"	Jacques Offenbach
10.	"I Feel Pretty (Tarja)"	Leonard Bernstein
11.	"William Tell Overture (Mike)"	Gioachino Rossini
12.	"Mein Herr Marquis (Tarja)"	Richard Strauss
13.	"Eine kleine Nachtmusik (Mike)"	Wolfgang Amadeus Mozart

CD2
No.	Title	Writer(s)	Length
1.	"You Take My Breath Away (Tarja)"	Freddie Mercury
2.	"The Reign (Tarja & Mike)"	Zagoritis, Stenzel, Heldmann, Turunen
3.	"Witch-Hunt (Tarja & Mike)"	Tarja
4.	"Led Zeppelin Medley (Tarja & Mike)"	Led Zeppelin
5.	"Swanheart (Tarja & Mike)"	Tuomas Holopainen
6.	"Fly Me to the Moon (Tarja & Mike)"	Bart Howard
7.	"Into the Sun (Tarja & Mike)"	Tarja Turunen, Anders Wollbeck, Mattias Lindblom, Steve van Velvet
8.	"I Walk Alone (Tarja & Mike)"	Anders Wollbeck, Mattias Lindblom, Harry Sommerdahl

== Double DVD track listing ==
DVD1
No.	Title	Writer(s)	Length
1.	"Carmen Overture (Orchestra)"	Georges Bizet
2.	"Concert for Violin & Oboe (Mike)"	Johann Sebastian Bach
3.	"Blute Nur (Tarja)"	Johann Sebastian Bach
4.	"Zueignung - Op. 10, No. 1 (Tarja)"	Richard Strauss
5.	"Barber of Seville (Mike)"	Gioachino Rossini
6.	"New World Symphony (Mike)"	Antonín Dvořák
7.	"Song to the Moon (Tarja)"	Antonín Dvořák
8.	"Vilja Lied (Tarja)"	Franz Lehár
9.	"O mio babbino caro (Tarja)"	Giacomo Puccini
10.	"The Reign (Tarja & Mike)"	Zagoritis, Stenzel, Heldmann, Turunen

DVD2
No.	Title	Writer(s)	Length
1.	"You Take My Breath Away (Tarja)"	Freddie Mercury
2.	"Witch-hunt (Tarja & Mike)"	Tarja
3.	"Led Zeppelin Medley (Tarja & Mike)"	Led Zeppelin
4.	"Swanheart (Tarja & Mike)"	Tuomas Holopainen
5.	"Can-can (Mike)"	Jacques Offenbach
6.	"Mein Herr Marquis (Tarja)"	Richard Strauss
7.	"Fly Me to the Moon (Tarja & Mike)"	Bart Howard
8.	"Into the Sun (Tarja & Mike)"	Tarja Turunen, Anders Wollbeck, Mattias Lindblom, Steve van Velvet
9.	"William Tell Overture (Mike)"	Gioachino Rossini
10.	"I Feel Pretty (Tarja)"	Leonard Bernstein
11.	"Eine kleine Nachtmusik (Mike)"	Wolfgang Amadeus Mozart
12.	"I Walk Alone (Tarja & Mike)"	Anders Wollbeck, Mattias Lindblom, Harry Sommerdahl

+Bonus

- Bonus Material
- Photo Gallery
