= In the Light =

1975 song by Led Zeppelin

Song by Led Zeppelin

from the album Physical Graffiti
- Released: 24 February 1975
- Recorded: 1974
- Studio: Headley Grange, Headley, England; Olympic, London
- Genre: Progressive rock; art rock
- Length: 8:46
- Label: Swan Song
- Songwriter(s): John Paul Jones; Jimmy Page; Robert Plant
- Producer(s): Jimmy Page

"In the Light" is a song by English rock band Led Zeppelin from their 1975 album Physical Graffiti. The song was composed primarily by bassist/keyboardist John Paul Jones on synthesiser, though singer Robert Plant and guitarist Jimmy Page also received songwriting credits.

== Composition and recording ==
The unique sound of the intro was created by Page using a bow on an acoustic guitar, as a backdrop to Jones' opening synthesiser solo. The song is based on an earlier band composition titled "In the Morning".

Led Zeppelin also recorded an alternative version of the song, "Everybody Makes It Through" (In the Light) [Early Version/In Transit]". This version was released on 23 February 2015, as part of the remastering process of all nine albums. Led Zeppelin never performed "In the Light" in concert.

== Reception ==
In a contemporary review of Physical Graffiti, Jim Miller of Rolling Stone gave "In the Light" a mixed review, saying that while the track was "one of the album's most ambitious efforts", the track "fizzles down the home stretch." Miller continues "the problem here is not tedium but a fragmentary composition that never quite jells: When Page on the final release plays an ascending run intended to sound majestic, the effect is more stilted than stately."

In a retrospective review of Physical Graffiti (Deluxe Edition), Jon Hadusek of Consequence of Sound called "In the Light" one of his favorite Zeppelin songs; Hadusek believed the song's arrangement "shouldn't work, but it does". Describing the track, Hadusek said the track "erratically builds from solo organs and doom riffs to a cheerful chorus of major scales."

In an interview he gave to rock journalist Cameron Crowe, Plant stated that this song was one of Led Zeppelin's "finest moments". Similarly, Page has stated that this is his personal favourite track on Physical Graffiti.

== In popular culture ==
"In the Light' was featured in the season 1 finale of the Netflix series Mindhunter as lead character Holden Ford suffers a panic attack following a threat by a serial killer.

== Personnel ==
According to Jean-Michel Guesdon and Philippe Margotin:

- Robert Plant – vocals
- Jimmy Page – electric guitars, bow
- John Paul Jones – bass, synthesiser, Clavinet
- John Bonham – drums

== See also ==
- List of cover versions of Led Zeppelin songs § In the Light

== Bibliography ==
- Guesdon, Jean-Michel; Margotin, Philippe (2018). Led Zeppelin All the Songs: The Story Behind Every Track. Running Press. ISBN 978-0-316-448-67-3.
