= Houses of the Holy (song) =

1975 song by Led Zeppelin

Song by Led Zeppelin

from the album Physical Graffiti
- Released: 24 February 1975
- Recorded: 1972
- Studio: Olympic, London
- Genre: Hard rock
- Length: 4:01
- Label: Swan Song
- Songwriters: Jimmy Page; Robert Plant
- Producer: Jimmy Page

"Houses of the Holy" is a song by English rock band Led Zeppelin from their 1975 sixth album Physical Graffiti. The name of the song was used as the title of the band's fifth album, although it was not included on that album; they decided the song did not fit well with the other album material, so it was moved to the subsequent release.

== Composition and recording ==
In order to create the layered guitar introduction and fade-out, Page used a Delta T digital delay unit. The squeak of John Bonham's drum pedal can be heard throughout the song.

Record producer Rick Rubin has remarked, "This is a funk jam with really interesting, jazzy chords. It's one of their more compact feeling songs. And it's the only Zep song to use what sounds like a cowbell."

== Live performances ==
The song was never played live by Led Zeppelin, though Robert Plant performed it with the Band of Joy during his 2010 solo tour. Additionally, Jimmy Page and the Black Crowes tested out the song in rehearsals for their 2000 tour, but dropped it before touring began.

== Reception ==
In a contemporary review of Physical Graffiti, Jim Miller of Rolling Stone gave "Houses of the Holy" a positive review, saying "Plant's lyrics mesh perfectly with Page's stuttering licks." Miller continues "Here again, the details are half the fun: Bonham kicks the cut along with a cowbell while the two final verses add what sounds like a squeaky chorus of "doit"s behind the vocal; Plant meanwhile is almost inaudibly overdubbed on the song's central chorus, underlining the phrase "let the music be your master.""

== Personnel ==
According to Jean-Michel Guesdon and Philippe Margotin:

- Robert Plant – vocals
- Jimmy Page – electric guitars
- John Paul Jones – bass
- John Bonham – drums, cowbell

== See also ==
- List of cover versions of Led Zeppelin songs – "Houses of the Holy" entries

== Bibliography ==
- Guesdon, Jean-Michel; Margotin, Philippe (2018). Led Zeppelin All the Songs: The Story Behind Every Track. Running Press. ISBN 978-0-316-448-67-3.
