= The Rain Song =

1973 song by Led Zeppelin

Song by Led Zeppelin

from the album Houses of the Holy
- Released: 28 March 1973
- Recorded: 1972
- Studio: Stargroves, East Woodhay, England
- Genre: Progressive rock; art rock; new age
- Length: 7:32
- Label: Atlantic
- Songwriters: Jimmy Page; Robert Plant
- Producer: Jimmy Page

"The Rain Song" is a song by the English rock band Led Zeppelin. It uses an alternative guitar tuning, DGCGCD, a variation of DADGAD. It was released in March 1973 as the second track on their fifth album, Houses of the Holy.

== Recording ==
"The Rain Song" is a ballad over seven minutes in length. Guitarist Jimmy Page originally constructed the melody of this song at his home in Plumpton, England, where he had recently installed a studio mixing console. A new Vista model, it was partly made up from the Pye Mobile Studio which had been used to record the group's 1970 Royal Albert Hall performance and the Who's Live at Leeds album.

With a working title of "Slush", a reference to its easy listening simulated orchestral arrangement, Page was able to bring in a completed arrangement of the melody, for which singer Robert Plant wrote the words. Plant ranks his vocal performance on the track as one of his best. The song also features a Mellotron played by John Paul Jones to add to the orchestral effect, while Page plays a Danelectro guitar.

Page wrote "The Rain Song" in response to George Harrison complaining to Led Zeppelin drummer John Bonham that the group never wrote ballads. In Light and Shade: Conversations with Jimmy Page, biographer Brad Tolinski quotes Page's recollection:

George was talking to Bonzo one evening and said, "The problem with you guys is that you never do ballads." I said, "I'll give him a ballad," and I wrote "Rain Song," which appears on Houses of the Holy. In fact, you'll notice I even quote "Something" in the song's first two chords.

== Live history ==
During Led Zeppelin concerts from late 1972 until 1975, the band played "The Rain Song" immediately following "The Song Remains the Same", presenting the songs in the same order as they appeared on the album. They organised their set list in this manner because Page used a Gibson EDS-1275 double-necked guitar for both songs: the top, 12-string neck for "The Song Remains the Same" and then switching to the bottom, 6-string neck for "The Rain Song". The song was dropped from the 1977 US tour, but returned for Led Zeppelin's 1979 concerts in Copenhagen, Denmark and at the Knebworth Music Festival, as well as their European tour in 1980.

== Critical reception ==
In a contemporary review for Houses of the Holy, Gordon Fletcher of Rolling Stone gave "The Rain Song" a negative review, pairing it with "No Quarter" as "nothing more than drawn-out vehicles for the further display of Jones' unknowledgeable use of mellotron and synthesizer". Writing for the same publication in 2003, Gavin Edwards said that Page and Plant "rose to the challenge" presented by Harrison's comment, and the band created "seven minutes of exquisite heartache".

In his review of the 2014 Houses of the Holy (Deluxe Edition), Kristofer Lenz of Consequence of Sound described "The Rain Song" as "one of the most sentimental tracks in Led Zeppelin's catalog" and called it "patient and beautifully arranged". Lenz also wrote that Plant's lyrics and vocals "infuse a sense of humanity, loss, and transcendence – a touch of emotional maturity".

Record producer Rick Rubin has said of "The Rain Song": "I don't even know what kind of music this is. It defies classification. There's such tasteful, beautiful detail in the guitar, and a triumphant feel when the drums come in – it's sad and moody and strong, all at the same time. I could listen to this song all day. That would be a good day."

== Other versions ==
A different version of this song is featured on the second disc of the remastered 2CD deluxe edition of Houses of the Holy. Titled "The Rain Song (Mix Minus Piano)", it was recorded on 18 May 1972 at the Rolling Stones Mobile Studio at Stargroves with engineer Eddie Kramer and mix engineer Keith Harwood. Page and Plant recorded a version of the song in 1994 but it was not originally released on their album No Quarter: Jimmy Page and Robert Plant Unledded. It was, however, released on the special tenth anniversary reissue of that album in 2004.

On March 28, 2023, Jimmy Page released a previously unheard early demo of The Rain Song on his personal website and Youtube channel, to commemorate the fiftieth anniversary of Houses of the Holy. According to Page, the demo tape was missing while he was assembling the Deluxe versions of Led Zeppelin's catalog in 2014 and 2015. In a 2020 interview with Rolling Stone, he described the tape as having been recently discovered.

== Personnel ==
According to Jean-Michel Guesdon and Philippe Margotin:

- Robert Plant – vocals
- Jimmy Page – acoustic and electric guitars
- John Paul Jones – bass, Mellotron, piano
- John Bonham – drums

== See also ==
- List of cover versions of Led Zeppelin songs – "The Rain Song" entries

== Bibliography ==
- Guesdon, Jean-Michel; Margotin, Philippe (2018). Led Zeppelin All the Songs: The Story Behind Every Track. Running Press. ISBN 978-0-316-448-67-3.
