= The Battle of Evermore =

1971 song by Led Zeppelin

Song by Led Zeppelin

from the album Led Zeppelin IV
- Released: 8 November 1971
- Recorded: January–February 1971
- Studio: Rolling Stones Mobile, Headley Grange, Hampshire: Island, London
- Genre: Folk; Celtic folk; folk rock
- Length: 5:38
- Label: Atlantic
- Songwriters: Jimmy Page; Robert Plant
- Producer: Jimmy Page

"The Battle of Evermore" is a folk rock song on the English rock band Led Zeppelin's untitled 1971 album, commonly known as Led Zeppelin IV. Featuring vocal duets sung by the band's lead singer Robert Plant and folk singer Sandy Denny, the song's instrumentation includes both acoustic guitar and mandolin, and the lyrics allude to J. R. R. Tolkien's fantasy novel The Lord of the Rings.

== Writing and production ==
=== Writing ===
The song was written by Jimmy Page and Robert Plant at Headley Grange while Page was experimenting on John Paul Jones's mandolin. Page explained in 1977 that "'Battle of Evermore' was made up on the spot by Robert [Plant] and myself. I just picked up John Paul Jones's mandolin, never having played a mandolin before, and just wrote up the chords and the whole thing in one sitting."

=== Allusions to The Lord of the Rings ===
The song, like Led Zeppelin's "Ramble On" (Led Zeppelin II) and "Misty Mountain Hop" (also Led Zeppelin IV), makes references to J. R. R. Tolkien's fantasy novel The Lord of the Rings, with "The Dark Lord rides in force tonight and time will tell us all" in line 4, "The drums will shake the castle wall, the Ringwraiths ride in black" in line 18, and mentions of war and swords (line 13), shooting with a bow (line 19), magic runes (line 20) and "the dragon of darkness" in line 24. The J. R. R. Tolkien Encyclopedia states that the three songs make "direct references to Gollum, Mordor, the Ringwraiths, and events described in The Silmarillion and Lord of the Rings".

The Oxford Handbook of Music and Medievalism treats the song as "fantasy medievalism", seeing allusions to multiple features of Tolkien's Middle-earth. It notes that the song "specifically alludes" to the Dark Lord and the Ringwraiths, while the "Queen of Light" mentioned is "possibly" the elf-queen Galadriel. It states that the battle in the song "has often been identified by fans" as the Battle of the Pelennor Fields. Describing the effect of the song, it writes that Plant makes use of the feeling of nostalgia with the "strain and desperation" in his "vocal cries" combined with the "haunting, pastoral soundscape" that together set up "the destructive world of war in opposition to an idealized and Arcadian peaceful home".

=== Sandy Denny ===
Sandy Denny's symbol

Plant felt he needed another voice to tell the story, and for the recording of the song, singer Sandy Denny was invited to duet with Plant. Denny was a former member of the British folk rock group Fairport Convention, with whom Led Zeppelin had shared a bill in 1970 at the Bath Festival of Blues and Progressive Music. Plant played the role of the narrator and Denny represented the town crier. Page elaborated that "[The song] sounded like an old English instrumental first off. Then it became a vocal and Robert did his bit. Finally we figured we'd bring Sandy by and do a question-and-answer-type thing."

To thank her for her involvement, Denny was given the symbol on the album sleeve of three pyramids (the four members of Led Zeppelin each chose their own symbols for the album). This is the only song Led Zeppelin ever recorded with a guest vocalist. In an interview he gave in 1995 to Uncut magazine, Plant stated that "[F]or me to sing with Sandy Denny was great. We were always good friends with that period of Fairport Convention. Richard Thompson is a superlative guitarist. Sandy and I were friends, and it was the most obvious thing to ask her to sing on 'The Battle of Evermore'. If it suffered from naivete and tweeness—I was only 23—it makes up for it in the cohesion of the voices and the playing."

== Personnel ==
According to Jean-Michel Guesdon and Philippe Margotin:

- Robert Plant – vocals
- Jimmy Page – mandolin, acoustic guitar
- John Paul Jones – mandolin (?), acoustic guitar (?)
- Sandy Denny – vocals

== Live performances ==
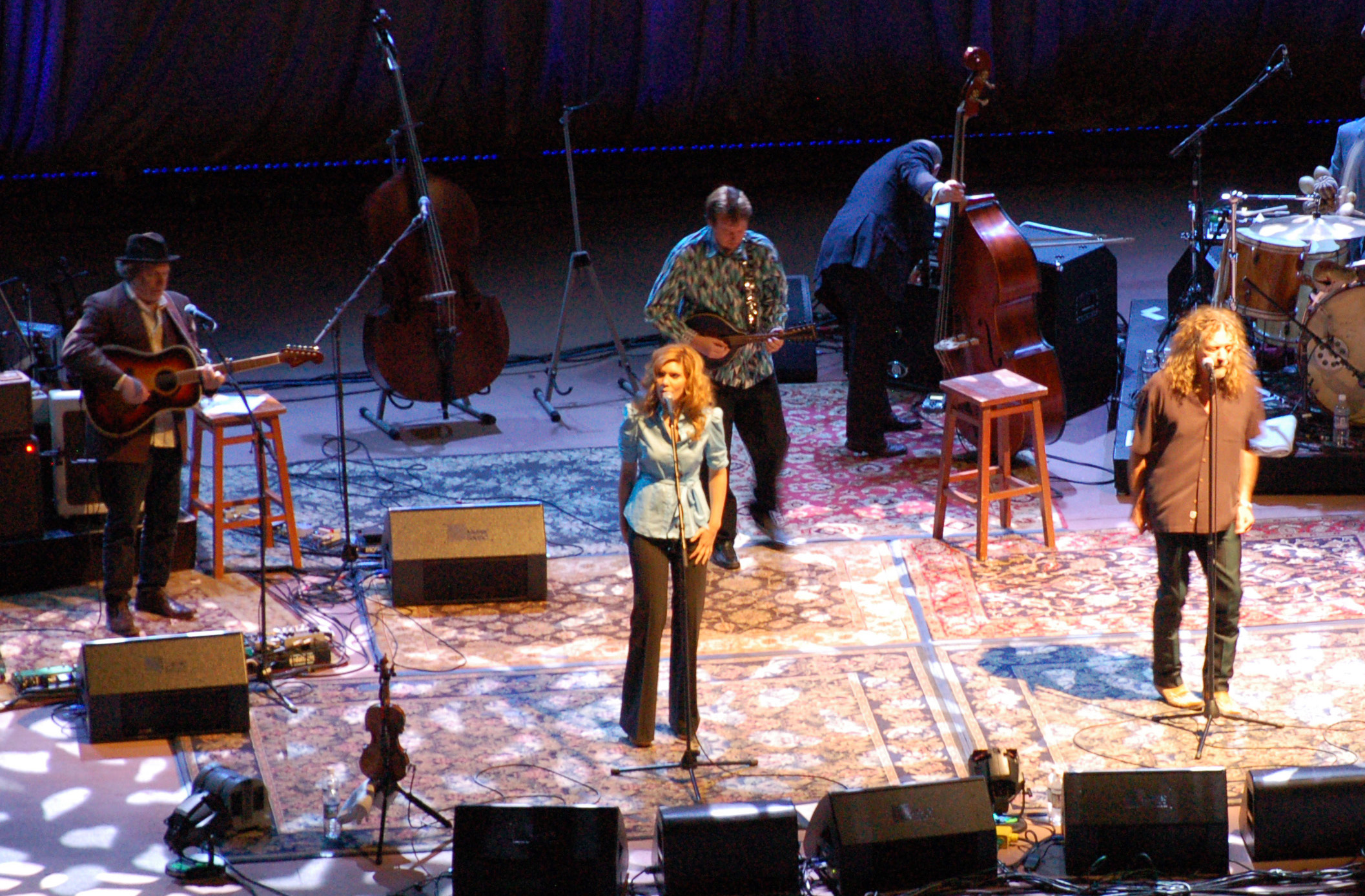
Alison Krauss and Robert Plant perform "The Battle of Evermore" at Denver's Red Rocks, 21 June 2008

"The Battle of Evermore" was played live at Led Zeppelin concerts during the band's 1977 North American Tour. For these live performances, Jones sang Denny's vocals and played acoustic guitar whilst Page played mandolin. Sometimes John Bonham sang Denny's vocals along with Jones. The British rock band Fairport Convention performed "The Battle of Evermore" with guest vocalists Plant and Kristina Donahue at Fairport's Cropredy Convention on 9 August 2008. Plant and Alison Krauss regularly performed "The Battle of Evermore" on their tour of US and Europe in spring and summer 2008 in promotion of their 2007 collaboration album Raising Sand.

== Other versions ==
An instrumental version of the song is featured on the companion audio CD on the remastered deluxe 2CD version of Led Zeppelin IV, titled The Battle of Evermore (Mandolin/Guitar Mix From Headley Grange), recorded on 29 January 1971, at the Rolling Stones Mobile at Headley Grange with engineer Andy Johns. It is much shorter than the original, with a running time of 4:13 rather than 5:51.

Page and Plant recorded a live version of the song in 1994, released on their album No Quarter: Jimmy Page and Robert Plant Unledded. Najma Akhtar sang Denny's vocal part.

== Accolades ==
Year	Publication	Country	Accolade	Rank
2004	Q	UK	"150 Greatest Rock Lists Ever" (10 Songs Based on Novels)	4
2004	Q	UK	"1010 Songs You Must Own!"	*

(*) designates unordered lists.

== See also ==
- List of cover versions of Led Zeppelin songs § The Battle of Evermore

== Bibliography ==
- Guesdon, Jean-Michel; Margotin, Philippe (2018). Led Zeppelin All the Songs: The Story Behind Every Track. Running Press. ISBN 978-0-316-448-67-3.
