= Going to California =

Song by Led Zeppelin

from the album Led Zeppelin IV
- Released: 8 November 1971
- Recorded: 1971
- Studio: Headley Grange, Hampshire, England
- Genre: Folk; art rock
- Length: 3:32
- Label: Atlantic
- Songwriter(s): Jimmy Page, Robert Plant
- Producer(s): Jimmy Page

"Going to California" is a ballad recorded by the English rock band Led Zeppelin. It was released on their untitled fourth album in 1971.

In 2012, Rolling Stone ranked "Going to California" number 11 on their list of the 40 greatest Led Zeppelin songs of all time.

== Composition ==
"Going to California" is a folk-style song, with Robert Plant on vocal, acoustic guitar by Jimmy Page and mandolin by John Paul Jones. Page uses an alternative guitar tuning (D–A–D–G–B–D or double drop D tuning) for the recording.

The song started out as a song about Californian earthquakes and when Jimmy Page, audio engineer Andy Johns and band manager Peter Grant travelled to Los Angeles to mix Led Zeppelin IV, they coincidentally experienced a minor earthquake. At this point it was known as "Guide to California".

According to music writer Nick DeRiso, Joni Mitchell also inspired the song: "Plant makes a clear reference to 'I Had a King', the opening song from Mitchell's debut album, 1968's Song to a Seagull: 'To find a queen without a king', he quietly offers in the final verse. 'They say she plays guitar, cries and sings.'" In an interview for Spin magazine, Plant admitted that it "might be a bit embarrassing at times lyrically, but it did sum up a period of my life when I was 22."

== Performances ==
At Led Zeppelin concerts the band performed this song during their acoustic sets, first playing it on their Spring 1971 tour of the United Kingdom. One live version, from Led Zeppelin's performance at Earls Court in 1975, is featured on disc 2 of the Led Zeppelin DVD and again on the Mothership DVD. The song was also performed at all shows on Led Zeppelin's mammoth 1977 US tour.

It was performed on Plant's solo tours during 1988/1989 and at the Knebworth Silver Clef show in 1990. He played it again on his Mighty ReArranger tour, with additions of a double bass and a synthesiser.

The Black Crowes and Slash performed a cover of the song on January 30, 2025 at Kia Forum in Inglewood, California for FireAid to help with relief efforts for the January 2025 Southern California wildfires.

== Other versions ==
A different version of this song is featured on the second disc of the remastered 2CD deluxe edition of Led Zeppelin IV. Known as "Going to California (Mandolin/Guitar Mix)", it is an instrumental recorded on 29 January 1971, with the Rolling Stones Mobile Studio at Headley Grange with engineer Andy Johns.

== Personnel ==
According to Jean-Michel Guesdon and Philippe Margotin:

- Robert Plant – vocals
- Jimmy Page – acoustic guitars (six-string and twelve-string)
- John Paul Jones – mandolin

== See also ==
- List of cover versions of Led Zeppelin songs § Going to California

== Bibliography ==
- Guesdon, Jean-Michel; Margotin, Philippe (2018). Led Zeppelin All the Songs: The Story Behind Every Track. Running Press. ISBN 978-0-316-448-67-3.
