= All My Love (Led Zeppelin song) =

Song by Led Zeppelin

from the album In Through the Out Door
- Released: 15 August 1979
- Recorded: November–December 1978
- Studio: Polar, Stockholm, Sweden
- Genre: Rock; progressive rock; soft rock
- Length: 5:53
- Label: Swan Song
- Songwriters: John Paul Jones, Robert Plant
- Producer: Jimmy Page

"All My Love" is the sixth song on Led Zeppelin's eighth studio album, In Through the Out Door (1979).

Credited to Robert Plant and John Paul Jones, it is a ballad that features a synthesizer solo by Jones. "All My Love" was written in honour of Plant's son Karac, who died at age five in 1977.

"All My Love" is one of only two Led Zeppelin songs that Jimmy Page had no part in writing.

== Recording and releases ==
"All My Love" is a mid-tempo rock-style ballad that biographer Nigel Williamson describes as "underpinned by a semi-classical arrangement of the kind popular at the time with the likes of Genesis and ELO". The original working title was "The Hook". The song was recorded between November and December 1978 at Polar Studios in Stockholm, Sweden. A studio outtake of an extended version of the song exists timed around 7:55 (the song itself would be timed around 6:57). It has a complete ending, with Plant extending the last chorus with much ad-libbing and a twangy B-Bender guitar solo by Page.

Led Zeppelin performed the song during their concert tour of Europe in 1980. "All My Love" is also included in the Led Zeppelin compilations Early Days and Latter Days, Remasters and Mothership.

A mono mix of the song was re-released in 2015 on In Through the Out Door (Deluxe Edition), under the title "The Hook".

Plant has described the song as a tribute to his son Karac for the "'joy he gave us as a family ... And in a crazy way still does occasionally. Every now and again he turns up in songs ... for no other reason than I miss him a lot'".

== Critical reception ==
In a review for In Through the Out Door (Deluxe Edition), Andrew Doscas of PopMatters described "All My Love" as "the saddest and most heartfelt Zeppelin song." Doscas described the song as "a fitting ode to Plant's son, which hauntingly enough sounds like a foreshadowing of a band on the path to an impending and unforeseeable dissolution".

In its 1999 list of "Top 500 Tracks", Radio Caroline ranked the song at number 239.

In an interview he later gave to rock journalist Cameron Crowe, Plant stated that this song was one of Led Zeppelin's "finest moments". However, guitarist Jimmy Page and drummer John Bonham had reservations about the song's soft rock sound.

== Personnel ==
According to Jean-Michel Guesdon and Philippe Margotin:

- Robert Plant – vocals
- Jimmy Page – electric guitars, acoustic guitars
- John Paul Jones – bass, synthesiser
- John Bonham – drums

== See also ==
- List of cover versions of Led Zeppelin songs – "All My Love" entries

== Sources ==
- Lewis, Dave (2004). The Complete Guide to the Music of Led Zeppelin. London: Omnibus Press. ISBN 0-7119-3528-9.
- Shadwick, Keith (2005). Led Zeppelin: The Story of a Band and Their Music 1968–1980 (1st ed.). San Francisco: Backbeat Books. ISBN 0-87930-871-0.
- Tolinski, Brad (2012). Light and Shade: Conversations with Jimmy Page. Crown Publishing Group. ISBN 978-0-307-98573-6.
- Welch, Chris (1998). Led Zeppelin: Dazed and Confused: The Stories Behind Every Song. New York City: Thunder's Mouth Press. ISBN 1-56025-818-7.
- Williamson, Nigel (2007). The Rough Guide to Led Zeppelin. New York City: Penguin Books. ISBN 978-1405384216.

== Bibliography ==
- Guesdon, Jean-Michel; Margotin, Philippe (2018). Led Zeppelin All the Songs: The Story Behind Every Track. Running Press. ISBN 978-0-316-448-67-3.
