= Ramble On =

- Turkish single label

Song by Led Zeppelin

from the album Led Zeppelin II
- Released: 22 October 1969
- Recorded: 1–2 June 1969
- Studio: Juggy Sound Studio, New York City
- Genre: Folk rock; hard rock; blues rock
- Length: 4:35
- Label: Atlantic
- Songwriters: Jimmy Page; Robert Plant
- Producer: Jimmy Page

Audio video
- "Ramble On" on YouTube

"Ramble On" is a song by the English rock band Led Zeppelin. Co-written by Jimmy Page and Robert Plant and produced by Page, and recorded in 1969 at Juggy Sound Studio in New York City, it serves as the seventh track of their second studio album Led Zeppelin II. The song's lyrics were influenced by J. R. R. Tolkien's fantasy novel The Lord of the Rings.

The song was not released as a vinyl single in the US or the UK in the 20th century, but the album reached number 1 in both the US and the UK, and over 12 million copies have been sold. When it was eventually released as a digital single, it reached number 66 on the Billboard Canadian Digital Song Sales chart in 2007. Critics have admired the combination of the vocals and the guitar playing on the song.

== Composition and lyrics ==
=== Style ===
"Ramble On"
Page explained that he achieved the smooth, sustaining violin-like tone on the solo (as heard here) by using the neck pickup on his Les Paul guitar with the treble cut and utilising a sustain-producing effects unit built by Roger Mayer.

The song's genre has variously been described as folk rock, hard rock, and blues rock by different critics. The song is 4 minutes 35 seconds long as recorded on the album. "Ramble On" was co-written by Jimmy Page and Robert Plant; the lyrics were mainly written by Plant. The song was recorded in Groove Studios, New York City on 1 June 1969, and Juggy Sound Studio on 2 June. Page explained that he achieved the smooth, sustaining violin-like tone on the solo by using the neck pickup on his Gibson Les Paul guitar with the treble cut and utilising a sustain-producing effects unit built by the audio engineer Roger Mayer.

=== Allusions to The Lord of the Rings ===
The song's lyrics, particularly in the first line and the third verse, were influenced by J. R. R. Tolkien's The Lord of the Rings, mentioning among other things "the darkest depths of Mordor", Gollum, and "The Evil One" (Sauron). Its first line, "Leaves are falling all around", is an adaptation of Tolkien's "Ah! like gold fall the leaves in the wind", the English translation of the first line of his Quenya (Elvish language) poem "Namárië". The musicologist Caitlin Vaughn Carlos suggests that in the song's references to The Lord of the Rings, Led Zeppelin was relying on its audience's cultural memory "to actively participate in a dialogue of urban criticism and a romanticized vision of rural Britain". Andy Greene, writing in Rolling Stone, commented that "the narrator of [Led Zeppelin's] 1969 classic "Ramble On" finds himself in a very bizarre version of Middle Earth – a land where Mordor appears to be a great place to meet beautiful women, and Gollum and Sauron are more interested in fighting over the narrator's girlfriend than getting their hands on the One Ring".

== Reception ==
In his book Led Zeppelin: A Celebration, Dave Lewis wrote that "Ramble On" was "the highlight" of the Led Zeppelin II album, "slip[ping] effortlessly from quiet mournful passages into an uplifting chorus", and demonstrating the "light and shade dynamism" that became a hallmark of the band. Martin Popoff, in his book Led Zeppelin: All the Albums, All the Songs, commented that while the song starts off with a nod to "idyllic West Coast acoustic rock" with Plant playing the "romantic troubadour", its location is seen to be the dark land of Mordor in Middle-earth, though with un-Tolkienesque events. Popoff calls it "a strange reference", but notes that the music backs it up with the "near-Renaissance feel" of Page's guitar playing in the key of E major.

On American Songwriter, Jacob Uitti agreed that Page's acoustic guitar is stirring and Plant's vocals are electrifying, but emphasized that John Paul Jones's less-noticed bass playing is sublime. Uitti called the song "one of the band's best", because of "its dual-pronged sonic attack". In a retrospective review of Led Zeppelin II (Deluxe Edition), Michael Madden of Consequence of Sound praised the remastering of "Ramble On," commenting that the track now sounds "especially mellow and well-balanced". Madden wrote that the track "gets a boost from John Paul Jones' garter snake bass playing." Madden called the rough mix of "Ramble On" the best of all the bonus tracks in the Deluxe Edition, finding Page's acoustic strums "particularly driving".

The song was not released as a single in the 20th century, but the album reached number 1 in both the US and the UK, and over 12 million copies have been sold. In 2007, "Ramble On" reached number 66 on the Billboard Canadian Digital Song Sales chart. In 2010, the song was ranked number 440 on the list of Rolling Stone's 500 Greatest Songs of All Time. In 2019, Rolling Stone ranked the song number 5 on its list of the 40 greatest Led Zeppelin songs.

== Live performances ==
During Led Zeppelin’s original run before 1980, "Ramble On" was only played as a tease, but never as a complete song. The full song was first performed live at the Ahmet Ertegun Tribute Concert on 10 December 2007, at the O_{2} Arena in London; Page ended the song with a brief section of the bridge from "What Is and What Should Never Be".

== Personnel ==
According to Jean-Michel Guesdon and Philippe Margotin:

- Robert Plant – vocals
- Jimmy Page – electric and acoustic guitars
- John Paul Jones – bass
- John Bonham – drums, percussion

== Charts ==
Chart performance for "Ramble On"
Chart (2007)	Peak position
Canadian Digital Song Sales (Billboard)	66

== Certifications ==
Region	Certification	Certified units/sales
United Kingdom (BPI)	Silver	200,000^{‡}
^{‡} Sales+streaming figures based on certification alone.

== See also ==
- List of cover versions of Led Zeppelin songs § Ramble On

Other Led Zeppelin songs which similarly allude to The Lord of the Rings, both from Led Zeppelin IV:

- "The Battle of Evermore"
- "Misty Mountain Hop"

== Bibliography ==
- Guesdon, Jean-Michel; Margotin, Philippe (2018). Led Zeppelin All the Songs: The Story Behind Every Track. Running Press. ISBN 978-0-316-448-67-3.
