= The Ocean (Led Zeppelin song) =

- German single picture sleeve, 1973

Song by Led Zeppelin

from the album Houses of the Holy
- Released: 28 March 1973
- Recorded: 1972
- Studio: Stargroves, East Woodhay, England
- Genre: Hard rock
- Length: 4:28
- Label: Atlantic
- Songwriter: Led Zeppelin
- Producer: Jimmy Page

Audio sample
- file; help

"The Ocean" is a song by English rock band Led Zeppelin, from their 1973 album Houses of the Holy. The ocean is a metaphor for the "sea of heads" faced by lead singer Robert Plant "in the auditoriums", according to the group's biographer Dave Lewis.

== Overview ==
Eddie Kramer, who was present during the recording of Houses of the Holy, commented on extraneous noises in the recording: "It's entirely possible. [The song was] done in a house [but] I don't remember there being [a phone ringing]." Jimmy Page remarked:

I'm thrilled the records are recorded in such a way that the hi-fi quality, even though it's tough ... you can hear detail on it because that's what you're supposed to do. It was supposed to be something whereby you could hear everything that was going on.

"The Ocean" features an unusual time signature, being partially in septuple meter, with a repeated two-measure phrase consisting of one bar of 4/4 and one bar of 7/8. The introduction, "We've done four already, but now we're steady" is done by John Bonham. He is referring to the previous four recording takes, and the one on the record presumably is the fifth take of the session. The song finishes with a "fifties rock 'n' roll sequence" complete with "doo-wops", that bears no relationship to the previous part of the song.

== Live performances ==
In the last line, the "girl who won my heart" refers to Robert Plant's daughter Carmen, (born 21 November 1968), who was three years old at the time of recording. In concert, Plant always updated the lyric to reflect her current age, as captured on the Led Zeppelin DVD which features a performance of the song at Madison Square Garden in 1973. During this performance, Plant sang the third verse, which starts with "Sitting round singing songs 'til the night turns into day" as the second verse and sang the second verse at the end of the song. The band first played the song live on their 1972 U.S. concert tour and it remained as part of their performances through their 1973 U.S. tour. It was deleted from the set list thereafter.

== Reception ==
In a review for the reissue of Houses of the Holy, Kristofer Lenz of Consequence of Sound gave "The Ocean" a positive review, calling the song "clattering and demonstrative ... [an] underappreciated gem". Lenz continues, "Page and co. get back to their swaggering rock roots with one of the nastiest guitar riff/drum fill combos in rock history." and "The song and album end with a riotous crescendo as Plant screams out 'Ohhhh, so gooood!' And he is soooo right."

However, not all the reception for the song was as positive. In a contemporary review for Houses of the Holy, Gordon Fletcher of Rolling Stone gave "The Ocean" a negative review, calling the track "so diluted" and filled with "pointless humor". Fletcher further wrote, "Jimmy Page's guitar spits jagged fireballs with John Paul Jones and John Bonham riffing along behind him, but the effect is destroyed by ridiculous backup cooings and an overbearing "killer" coda that's so blatant it can only be taken as a mock of straight rock & roll."

Released as single in Germany, "The Ocean" reached number eight on the charts.

== Personnel ==
According to Jean-Michel Guesdon and Philippe Margotin:

- Robert Plant – vocals
- Jimmy Page – guitars, backing vocals
- John Paul Jones – bass, backing vocals
- John Bonham – drums, backing vocals

== See also ==
- List of cover versions of Led Zeppelin songs § The Ocean

== Bibliography ==
- Guesdon, Jean-Michel; Margotin, Philippe (2018). Led Zeppelin All the Songs: The Story Behind Every Track. Running Press. ISBN 978-0-316-448-67-3.
