= No Quarter (song) =

1973 song by Led Zeppelin

Song by Led Zeppelin

from the album Houses of the Holy
- Released: 28 March 1973
- Recorded: 1971–72
- Studio: Island, London
- Genre: Progressive rock; psychedelic rock; blues rock
- Length: 7:03
- Label: Atlantic
- Songwriters: John Paul Jones; Jimmy Page; Robert Plant
- Producer: Jimmy Page

Audio sample
- file; help

"No Quarter" is a song by English rock band Led Zeppelin that appears on their 1973 album Houses of the Holy. It was written by John Paul Jones, Jimmy Page, and Robert Plant. The song became a centerpiece at all Led Zeppelin concerts thereafter, until their final tour. It appears in both the film versions and both live album versions of The Song Remains the Same, released in 1976 and expanded in 2007. It appeared once more in 1994 on Page and Plant's reunion album as the title track. It also appears on Led Zeppelin's 2012 live album Celebration Day, which documented their 2007 reunion performance at the O2 Arena in London. It was re-released on the deluxe edition of Houses of the Holy.

== Overview ==
Although an early version was recorded at the Led Zeppelin IV album sessions, "No Quarter" was recorded (the basic tracks at least) in December 1971 at Island Studios, London. Andy Johns engineered the track and mixed it at Olympic Studios, London. The album version is a faster version Led Zeppelin had recorded earlier at Headley Grange, Hampshire. Jimmy Page applied vari-speed to drop the whole song by a semi-tone, to give it a thicker mood. In addition to the pitch change, the album version featured a very highly compressed guitar track, giving it a unique tone. The guitar solo effect was achieved by direct injection and compression.

The title refers to the military practice of showing no mercy to a vanquished opponent and the lyrics refer to the practice of not asking for mercy when defeated. Like "Immigrant Song" from two albums prior, it uses imagery about the Vikings and Norse mythology, in lyrics such as "the winds of Thor are blowing cold".

Record producer Rick Rubin remarked on the song's structure, "It takes such confidence to be able to get really quiet and loose for such a long time. [Led] Zeppelin completely changed how we look at what popular music can be."

== Performances and covers ==
From 1973, "No Quarter" became a centerpiece of Led Zeppelin concerts. It was played at virtually every concert until 1980, when it was dropped from their final tour "Over Europe").

During live performances, John Paul Jones frequently improvised on keyboards and played parts of classical music. On the band's ninth North American tour in 1973, performances of the song lasted twice the length of the studio version. On Led Zeppelin's concert tours from 1975 onward, Jones would also play a piano solo (on a Steinway B-211 grand piano) which sometimes extended the song's performance to over twenty minutes. Page and John Bonham joined him later in the song. Jones often played Rachmaninoff pieces, but sometimes included Joaquín Rodrigo's Concierto de Aranjuez and "Amazing Grace" as part of an extended medley.

The American rock band Tool recorded a 12-minute version of "No Quarter" in 1996 during the Ænima recording sessions. This track was requested for Howard Stern's Private Parts film in 1997. Tool did not agree to the request. The cover was included in Tool's 2000 box set, Salival.

== Reception ==
In a contemporary review for Houses of the Holy, Gordon Fletcher, of Rolling Stone (1973-1978), gave "No Quarter" a negative review, describing the track, along with "The Rain Song", as "nothing more than drawn-out vehicles for the further display of Jones' unknowledgeable use of mellotron and synthesizer."

== Personnel ==
According to Jean-Michel Guesdon and Philippe Margotin:

- Robert Plant – vocals
- Jimmy Page – electric guitars
- John Paul Jones – bass pedal (?), EMS VCS3, electric piano, piano
- John Bonham – drums

== See also ==
- List of cover versions of Led Zeppelin songs § No Quarter
