= What Is and What Should Never Be =

Song by Led Zeppelin

from the album Led Zeppelin II
- Released: 22 October 1969
- Recorded: 14–19 April 1969, 1 June 1969, 2 June 1969 (?)
- Studio: Olympic, London; Groove Studios, New York; Juggy Sound Studio, New York (?)
- Genre: Hard rock; blues rock; psychedelic rock
- Length: 4:47
- Label: Atlantic
- Songwriters: Jimmy Page, Robert Plant
- Producer: Jimmy Page

"What Is and What Should Never Be" is a song by English rock band Led Zeppelin. It was written by Jimmy Page and Robert Plant and was included as the second track on Led Zeppelin II (1969).

== Composition and recording ==
Guitarist Jimmy Page has said that he wrote the song on an acoustic Harmony Sovereign H1260 guitar. "What is and What Should Never Be" was one of the first songs on which Page used his soon-to-become trademark Gibson Les Paul for recording. The production makes liberal use of stereo as the guitars pan back and forth between channels. Robert Plant's vocals were phased during the verses. Record producer Rick Rubin has remarked, "The descending riff [of "What Is and What Should Never Be"] is amazing: It's like a bow is being drawn back, and then it releases. The rhythm of the vocals is almost like a rap. It's insane — one of their most psychedelic songs."

This was also one of the first songs recorded by the band for which Robert Plant received writing credit. According to rock journalist Stephen Davis, the author of the Led Zeppelin biography Hammer of the Gods: The Led Zeppelin Saga, the lyrics for this song reflect a romance Plant had with his wife's younger sister.

== Personnel ==
According to Jean-Michel Guesdon and Philippe Margotin:

- Robert Plant – vocals
- Jimmy Page – guitars, backing vocals (?)
- John Paul Jones – bass, backing vocals (?)
- John Bonham – drums, gong

== Live performances ==
"What Is and What Should Never Be" was performed live at Led Zeppelin concerts between 1969 and 1973. A live version taken from a performance at the Royal Albert Hall in 1970 can be seen on the Led Zeppelin DVD. Another was included on disc two of the live triple album How The West Was Won. Two more versions were included in BBC Sessions.

== Bibliography ==
- Guesdon, Jean-Michel; Margotin, Philippe (2018). Led Zeppelin All the Songs: The Story Behind Every Track. Running Press. ISBN 978-0-316-448-67-3.
