= List of awards and nominations received by Led Zeppelin =

Led Zeppelin awards and nominations
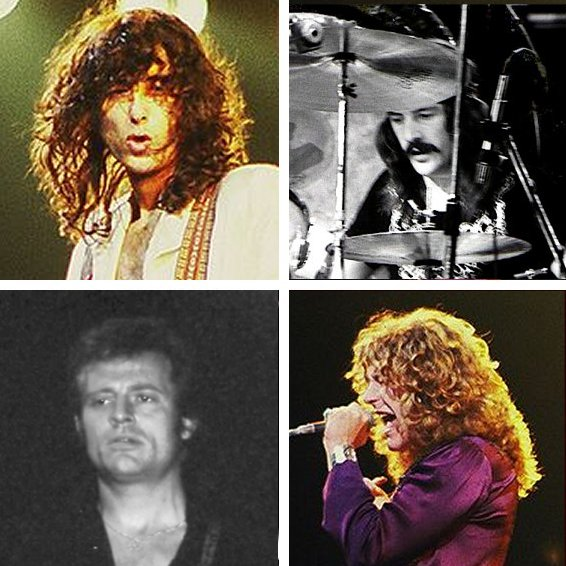
- Clockwise, from top left: Jimmy Page, John Bonham, Robert Plant, John Paul Jones
Awards and nominations
Award	Wins	Nominations
American Music Awards	1	1
Grammy	1	3

Totals (Note: Certain award groups do not simply award one winner. They acknowledge several different recipients, have runners-up, and have third place. Since this is a specific recognition and is different from losing an award, runner-up mentions are considered wins in this award tally. For simplification and to avoid errors, each award in this list has been presumed to have had a prior nomination.)
- Wins: 23
- Nominations: 25

Led Zeppelin were an English rock band who were active from 1968 to 1980. They are widely considered to be one of the most powerful, innovative, successful, and influential bands in the history of popular music. Led Zeppelin have sold over 300 million records worldwide, including 111.5 million certified units in the United States, making them one of the world's best-selling music artists in history, as well as the second best selling band of all time in the United States.

== American Music Awards ==
The American Music Awards are awarded annually by a poll of music buyers. Led Zeppelin was honoured with the "International Artist Award" in January 1995.

Year	Nominee / work	Award	Result	Ref.
1995	Led Zeppelin	International Artist Award	Won	

== Classic Rock Roll of Honour Awards ==
Classic Rock Roll of Honour Awards are presented annually by Classic Rock magazine. In November 2008, Led Zeppelin won "Event of the Year" for their 2007 reunion show. In 2013, they won "Film of the Year" for Celebration Day. In 2014, they won "Reissue of the Year" for the deluxe editions of their first three albums (Led Zeppelin I, II, and III).

Year	Nominee / work	Award	Result
2008	Ahmet Ertegun Tribute Concert	Event of the Year	Won
2013	Celebration Day	Film of the Year	Won
2014	Led Zeppelin I, II, & III Deluxe Edition	Reissue of the Year	Won

== GQ Men of the Year Awards ==
The GQ Men of the Year Awards are presented annually by Gentlemen's Quarterly magazine. Led Zeppelin were honoured with the "Outstanding Achievement Award" in 2008.

Year	Nominee / work	Award	Result
2008	Led Zeppelin	Outstanding Achievement Award	Won

== Grammy Awards ==
The Grammy Awards are awarded annually by the National Academy of Recording Arts and Sciences in the United States. Led Zeppelin received a Grammy Lifetime Achievement Award in 2005. During their tenure as a band, their albums Led Zeppelin II, Houses of the Holy, Physical Graffiti, Presence, and In Through the Out Door each received nominations for Best Recording Package. Led Zeppelin had also received a nomination for Best New Artist in 1969, but they lost to Crosby, Stills & Nash. Led Zeppelin IV, "Stairway to Heaven", Led Zeppelin and "Whole Lotta Love" were inducted into the Grammy Hall of Fame in 1999, 2003, 2004 and 2007 respectively.

Year	Nominee / work	Award	Result	Ref.
1970	Led Zeppelin	Best New Artist	Nominated	
2014	"Kashmir"	Best Rock Performance	Nominated	
2014	Celebration Day	Best Rock Album	Won	

== Ivor Novello Awards ==
The Ivor Novello Awards are presented annually in London by the British Academy of Songwriters, Composers and Authors. Led Zeppelin were awarded an Ivor Novello Award for "Outstanding Contribution to British Music" on 12 May 1977. The band also received a "Liftetime Achievement Award" at the 42nd Annual Ivor Novello Awards in May 1997.

Year	Nominee / work	Award	Result
1977	Led Zeppelin	Ivor Novello Award	Won
1997	Led Zeppelin	Liftetime Achievement Award	Won

== Kennedy Center honors ==
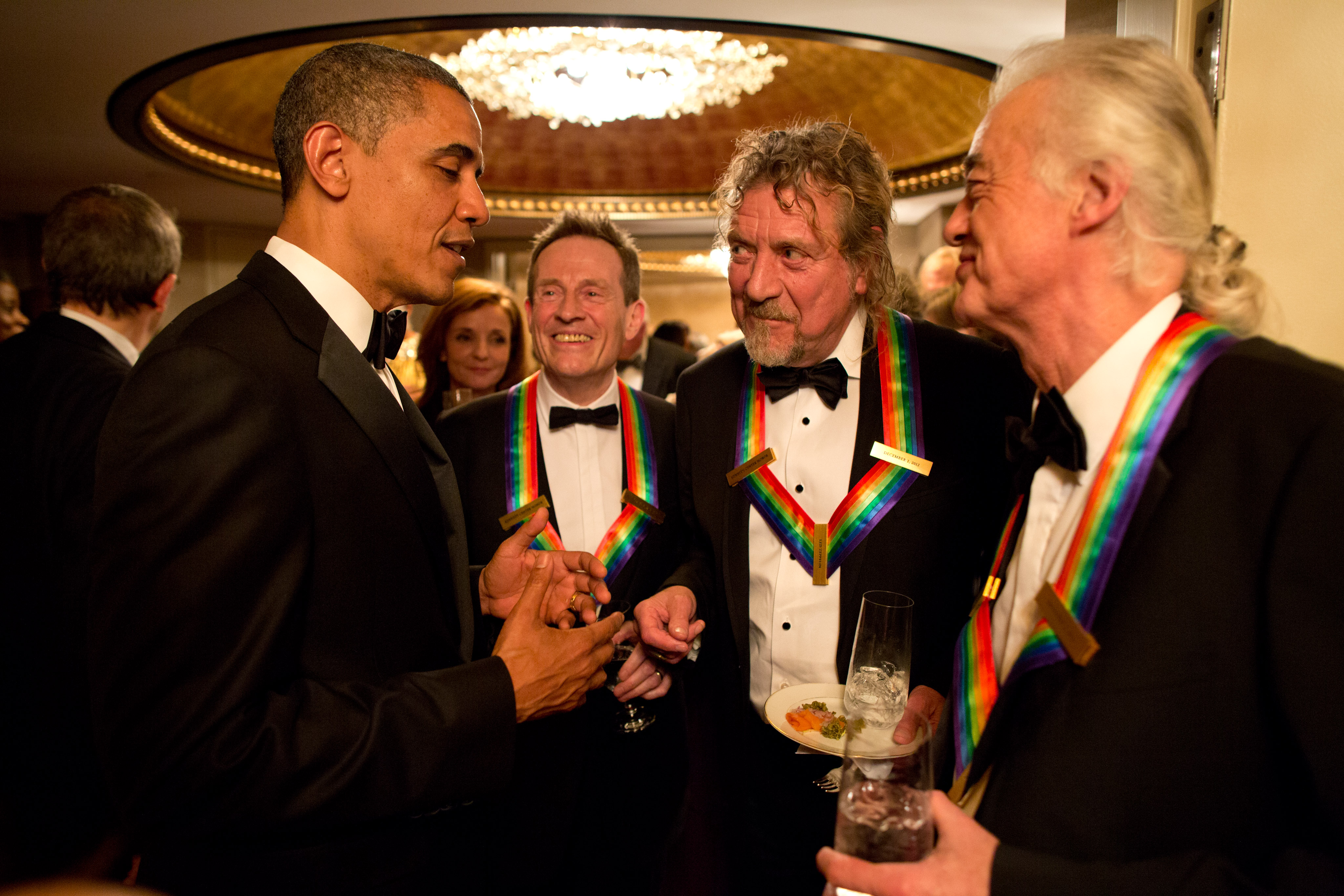
Led Zeppelin were honoured by US President Barack Obama at the 2012 Kennedy Center Honors.

In December 2012, US President Barack Obama honored Led Zeppelin by awarding the band with the US's highest cultural award, the Kennedy Center Honors.

== Melody Maker Awards ==
The Melody Maker Awards were presented by the England's oldest music magazine Melody Maker. Led Zeppelin were honoured with several Melody Maker Awards in 1970, 1975 and 1979.

== MOJO Awards ==
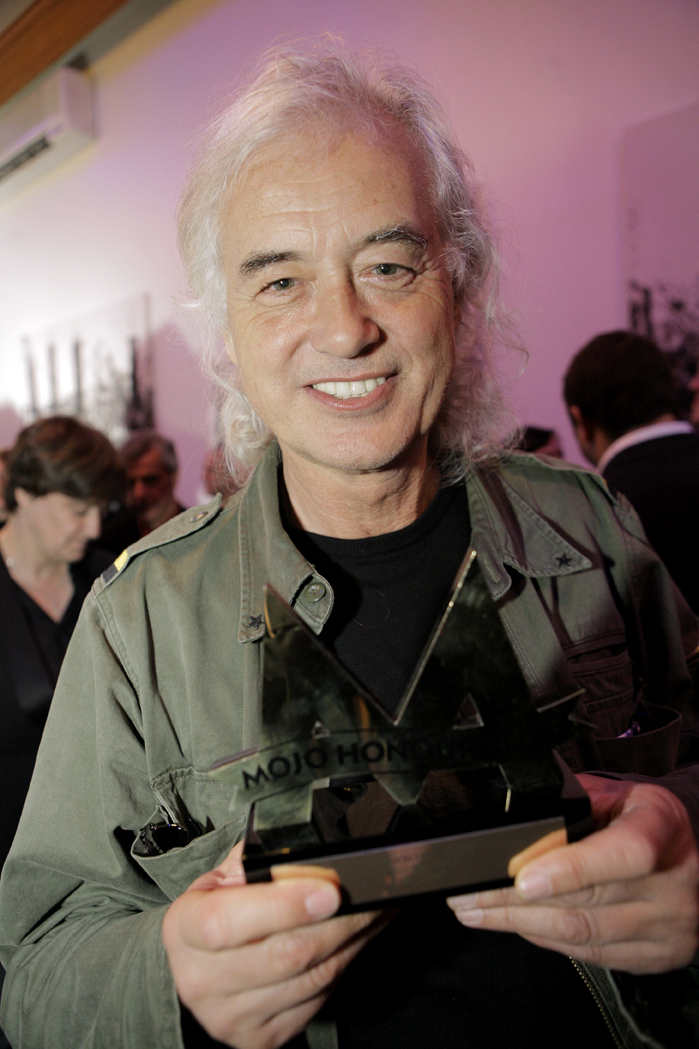
Page receiving the 2008 MOJO Award for Led Zeppelin as "best live act".

The MOJO Awards (or Mojo Honours Lists) is an awards ceremony that began in 2004 by Mojo, a popular music magazine published monthly by Bauer in the United Kingdom. Led Zeppelin received a MOJO Award in 2008 for the "best live act", as voted by the readers.

== NME Awards ==
The New Musical Express (better known as the NME) hosts the Shockwaves NME Awards and "NME Pop Poll". Led Zeppelin topped the readers poll for consecutive three years (1974–76) under the category of the best "Vocal Group". In 2008, Led Zeppelin got a Shockwaves NME Awards nomination under the category of the "Best Music DVD" for The Song Remains the Same.

== Polar Music Prize ==
The Polar Music Prize was founded in 1989 by Stig Anderson. Led Zeppelin received the honour in 2006.

== Q Awards ==
The Q Awards are the UK's annual music awards run by the music magazine Q. Led Zeppelin have received a "Q Merit Award" in 1992.

== Radio Music Awards ==
The Radio Music Awards was an annual U.S. award show that honours the year's most successful songs on mainstream radio. Led Zeppelin were nominated for "Artist of the Year/Rock Radio" in 2005.

== Surround Music Awards ==
Led Zeppelin were named as "Surround Artist of the Year" at the second annual Surround Music Awards in 2003. The awards ceremony was hosted by Grammy Award winners Ed Cherney and Al Schmitt.

== UK Music Video Awards ==
The UK Music Video Awards is an annual award ceremony founded in 2008 to recognise creativity, technical excellence and innovation in music videos and moving images for music.

Year	Nominee / work	Award	Result	Ref.
2013	Celebration Day	Best Live Music Coverage	Won	

== Inductions ==
=== Rock and Roll Hall of Fame ===
Led Zeppelin were inducted into the Rock and Roll Hall of Fame on 12 January 1995.

=== UK Music Hall of Fame ===
Led Zeppelin were inducted into the UK Music Hall of Fame on 14 November 2006.

=== Mojo Hall of Fame 100 ===
Led Zeppelin were inducted into the Mojo Hall of Fame 100 in November 2003.
