= Celebration Day (film) =

2012 Led Zeppelin concert film directed by Dick Carruthers

- Official film poster
- Directed by: Dick Carruthers
- Produced by: Dick Carruthers; Jim Parsons
- Starring: Led Zeppelin
- Cinematography: Eugene O'Connor
- Edited by: Henry Stein; Dick Carruthers
- Music by: Led Zeppelin
- Production company: Three P Films Limited
- Distributed by: Omniverse Vision
- Release date: 17 October 2012
- Running time: 124 minutes
- Country: United Kingdom
- Language: English
- Box office: $2 million

Celebration Day

Live album / Video by Led Zeppelin
- Released: 19 November 2012
- Recorded: 10 December 2007
- Venue: The O2 Arena, London, England, United Kingdom (for the Ahmet Ertegun Tribute Concert)
- Genre: Hard rock; blues rock
- Length: 1:55:35
- Label: Atlantic and Swan Song
- Producer: Jimmy Page

Led Zeppelin chronology
| Led Zeppelin Definitive Collection (2008) | Celebration Day (2012) | Led Zeppelin Deluxe Edition (2014-2015) |

Led Zeppelin live chronology
| How the West Was Won (2003) | Celebration Day (2007) | Live E.P. (2025) |

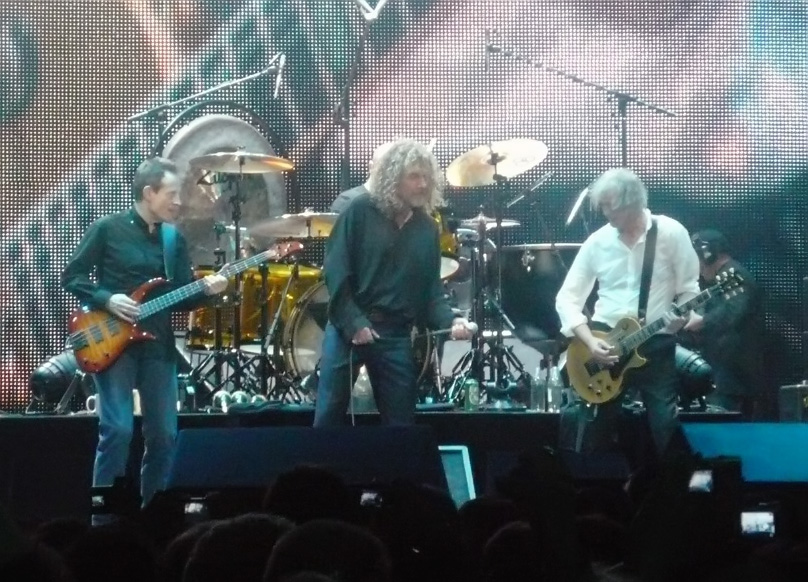
The surviving members of Led Zeppelin at the concert, from left to right: John Paul Jones, Robert Plant, and Jimmy Page. Jason Bonham, son of the late former drummer John Bonham, played drums during the set.

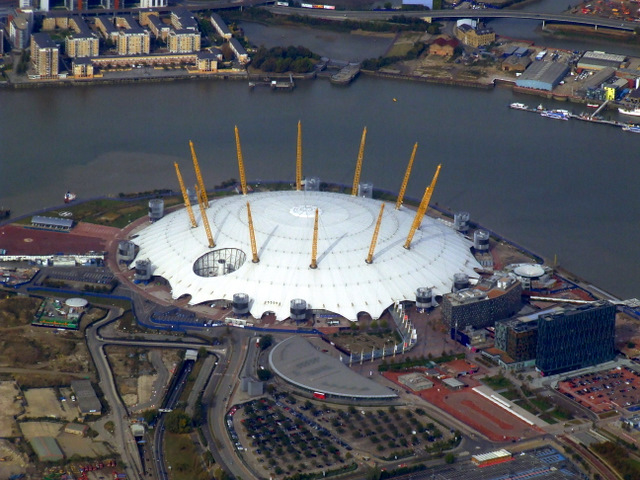
The O2 Arena, where the concert took place

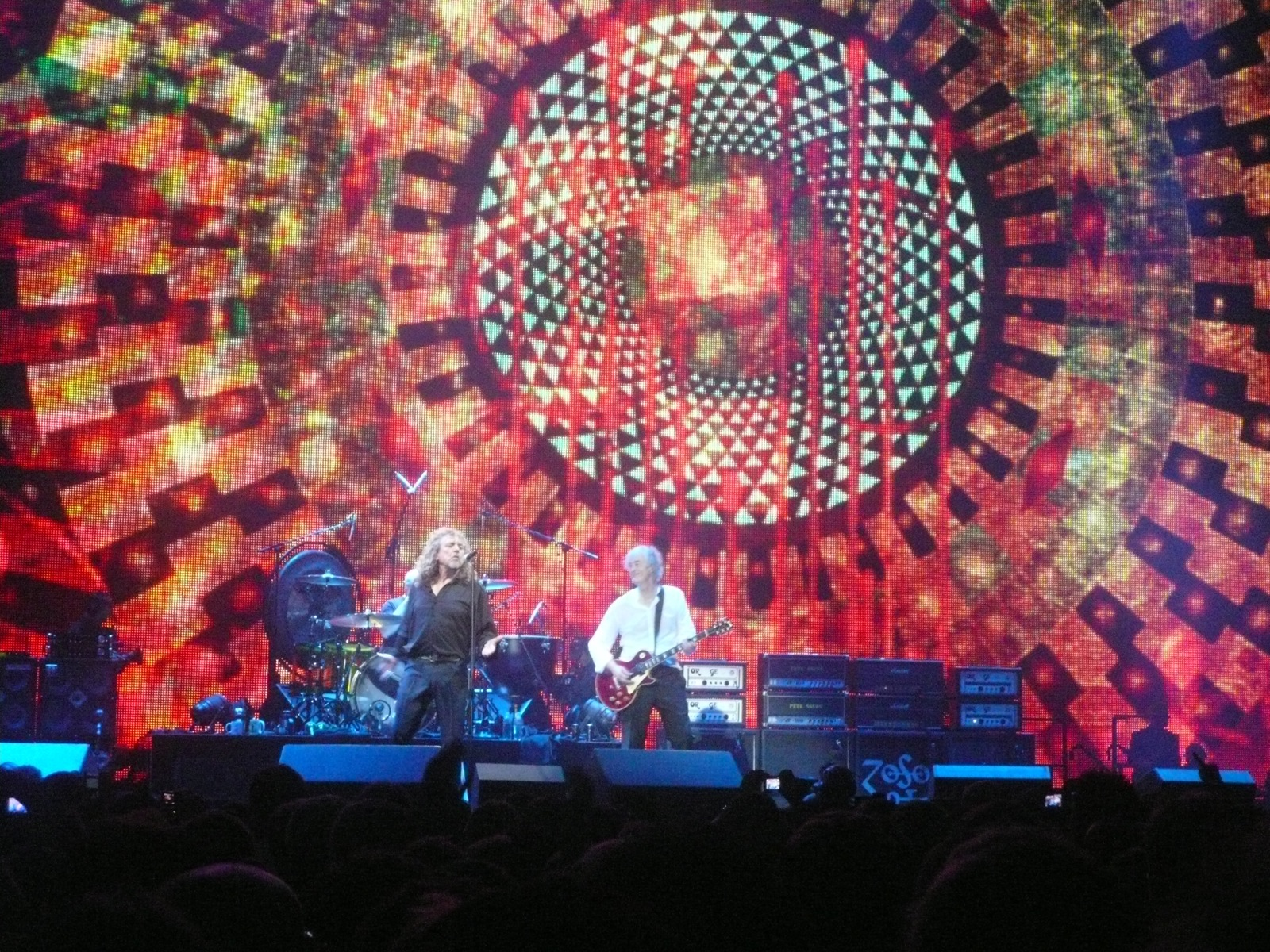
The band's performance included a complex visual display

Celebration Day is a concert film and live album by the English rock band Led Zeppelin, recorded at the Ahmet Ertegun Tribute Concert on 10 December 2007, in The O2 Arena, London. The film was given a limited theatrical release starting on 17 October 2012, and was released on several home audio and video formats on 19 November 2012. The performance, the film, and album releases have been widely praised.

== Recording and promotion ==
In 2007, a benefit concert to commemorate the life of music executive Ahmet Ertegun was staged with a reunited Led Zeppelin as the main act. They played many of their most famous songs to an enthusiastic crowd and coordinated a professional recording of the show with 16 cameras, with the prospect of a home video release. Rumours immediately circulated that the recording would become available, but the following year, band member Jimmy Page said that release wasn't certain and that it required mixing and would be a "massive job to embark on." Bassist John Paul Jones agreed that he would like to see it released commercially, but that there was no timeline. Even through 2010, Page was uncertain of the status of the album. On 9 September 2012, the band updated its Facebook page, which led to widespread speculation that the release was finally ready. Details leaked over the following days, with theatre web sites announcing airings of the film slated for the following month.

On 13 September, the band revealed that the film would hit theatres on 17 October, with premieres in Berlin, London, Los Angeles, New York City, and Tokyo and that the home video was scheduled for 19 November. The surviving members of the band appeared at a press event on 21 September to promote the release. They debuted the film at London's famed Hammersmith Apollo on October 12 (of 2012) and answered questions afterward; when queried about more reunion performances, the trio were coy.

Like the 2007 greatest hits album Mothership, the cover and promotional art were designed by Shepard Fairey. Alan Moulder worked with Jimmy Page on mixing the album but used only a minimal amount of overdubs and corrections, as both the performance itself and the recording were of high quality.

== Release and reception ==
The album was released in a standard edition consisting of one DVD or Blu-ray bundled with two soundtrack CDs. A triple vinyl LP was initially announced to be released on 10 December 2012 but distribution started in the middle of February 2013. The deluxe edition includes bonus video from the Shepperton rehearsals and news footage from the BBC. Additionally, there is an audio-only Blu-ray with DTS-HD MA 24-bit/48 kHz sound and no video.

=== Concert ===
The concert performance was well received. NME published that the show "prove[d] that they can still perform to the level that originally earned them their legendary reputation." Writing for The New Yorker, Sasha Frere-Jones opined, "the failed gigs of the nineteen-eighties and nineties have been supplanted by a triumph, and the band should be pleased to have done Ertegun proud with such a spirited performance."

=== Film ===
The film has also received acclaim from critics. Marc Lee of The Daily Telegraph gave it five out of five stars and concluded that "Celebration Day is a celebration of rock 'n' roll at its most moving, magical and magnificent." The initial screening opened to over 1,500 screens in 40 countries and grossed over USD$2 million, leading to further showings worldwide. In 2013, it won a Classic Rock Roll of Honours Award for Film of the Year.

=== Album ===
Professional ratings
Aggregate scores
| Source | Rating |
|---|---|
| Metacritic | 85/100 |
Review scores
| Source | Rating |
| AllMusic | 4/5 stars |
| American Songwriter | 4/5 stars |
| Classic Rock | 3.5/5 stars |
| Drowned in Sound | 8/10 |
| The Guardian | 4/5 stars |
| Kerrang! | 5/5 stars |
| The Observer | 4/5 stars |
| PopMatters | 9/10 |
| Sputnikmusic | 4.5/5 |
| The Sydney Morning Herald | 4/5 stars |

The album has received generally positive reviews from critics; it holds an 85% normalized score from review aggregator Metacritic, indicating "universal acclaim".

In terms of sales, it debuted on the Billboard 200 at No. 9. According to the International Federation of the Phonographic Industry (IFPI), Celebration Day was the 13th-best-selling album globally of 2012 with sales of 1.8 million copies.

The album won the Grammy Award for Best Rock Album at the 56th Annual Grammy Awards, and the rendition of "Kashmir" featured on the album was nominated for the award for Best Rock Performance.

== Track listing ==
All songs administered by WB Music Corp. (ASCAP)

Set

1. "Good Times Bad Times" (John Bonham, John Paul Jones, Jimmy Page and Robert Plant) – 3:45
2. "Ramble On" (Page and Plant) – 5:53
3. "Black Dog" (Jones, Page, and Plant) – 5:53
4. "In My Time of Dying" (Bonham, Jones, Page, and Plant) – 11:41
5. "For Your Life" (Page and Plant) – 6:50
6. "Trampled Under Foot" (Jones, Page, and Plant) – 6:28
7. "Nobody's Fault but Mine" (Page and Plant) – 6:49
8. "No Quarter" (Jones, Page, and Plant) – 11:22
9. "Since I've Been Loving You" (Jones, Page, and Plant) – 8:52
10. "Dazed and Confused" (Page; inspired by Jake Holmes) – 13:04
11. "Stairway to Heaven" (Page and Plant) – 8:49
12. "The Song Remains the Same" (Page and Plant) – 5:57
13. "Misty Mountain Hop" (Jones, Page, and Plant) – 5:38
14. "Kashmir" (Bonham, Page, and Plant) – 10:00

First encore

15. "Whole Lotta Love" (Bonham, Willie Dixon, Jones, Page and Plant) – 9:16

Second encore

16. "Rock and Roll" (Bonham, Jones, Page, and Plant) – 4:55

Video bonus features

- Shepperton rehearsals
- BBC footage

== Personnel ==
Led Zeppelin

- Jason Bonham – drums, percussion; backing vocals on "Good Times Bad Times" and "Misty Mountain Hop"
- John Paul Jones – bass guitar, Korg OASYS, Korg X50
- Jimmy Page – guitar, theremin, production
- Robert Plant – vocals; harmonica on "Nobody's Fault But Mine", tambourine on "In My Time of Dying" and "Stairway to Heaven"

Additional personnel

- Big Mick – live sound mixing
- Roy Williams – live vocals mixing
- Dick Carruthers – direction
- John Davis – mastering
- Alan Moulder – audio mixing (recorded music)
- Victor Riva – special effects

== Charts ==
2012–2013 weekly chart performance for Celebration Day
| Chart | Peak |
|---|---|
| Australian Albums (ARIA) | 3 |
| Austrian Albums (Ö3 Austria) | 3 |
| Belgian Albums (Ultratop Flanders) | 5 |
| Belgian Albums (Ultratop Wallonia) | 6 |
| Canadian Albums (Billboard) | 4 |
| Danish Albums (Hitlisten) | 4 |
| Dutch Albums (Album Top 100) | 2 |
| Finnish Albums (Suomen virallinen lista) | 6 |
| French Albums (SNEP) | 9 |
| German Albums (Offizielle Top 100) | 1 |
| Hungarian Albums (MAHASZ) | 1 |
| Irish Albums (IRMA) | 4 |
| Italian Albums (FIMI) | 5 |
| New Zealand Albums (RMNZ) | 1 |
| Norwegian Albums (VG-lista) | 2 |
| Portuguese Albums (AFP) | 9 |
| Scottish Albums (OCC) | 4 |
| Spanish Albums (Promusicae) | 15 |
| Swedish Albums (Sverigetopplistan) | 2 |
| Swiss Albums (Schweizer Hitparade) | 3 |
| UK Albums (OCC) | 4 |
| UK Rock & Metal Albums (OCC) | 1 |
| US Billboard 200 | 9 |
| US Top Hard Rock Albums (Billboard) | 1 |
| US Indie Store Album Sales (Billboard) | 1 |
| US Top Rock Albums (Billboard) | 3 |

== Certifications ==
Sales certifications for Celebration Day (audio album)
| Region | Certification | Certified units/sales |
|---|---|---|
| Australia (ARIA) | Gold | 35,000^{^} |
| Austria (IFPI Austria) | Gold | 10,000^{*} |
| Brazil (Pro-Música Brasil) | Platinum | 40,000^{*} |
| Canada (Music Canada) | 2× Platinum | 160,000^{^} |
| Denmark (IFPI Danmark) | Gold | 10,000^{^} |
| Finland (Musiikkituottajat) | Gold | 13,999 |
| France (SNEP) | Gold | 50,000^{*} |
| Germany (BVMI) | Platinum | 200,000^{^} |
| Hungary (MAHASZ) | Gold | 3,000^{^} |
| Ireland (IRMA) | Gold | 7,500^{^} |
| Italy (FIMI) | Platinum | 60,000^{*} |
| Mexico (AMPROFON) | Gold | 30,000^{^} |
| New Zealand (RMNZ) | Platinum | 15,000^{^} |
| Poland (ZPAV) | Diamond | 100,000^{*} |
| Sweden (GLF) | Gold | 20,000^{‡} |
| Switzerland (IFPI Switzerland) | Gold | 15,000^{^} |
| United Kingdom (BPI) | Platinum | 300,000^{‡} |
^{*} Sales figures based on certification alone.^{^} Shipments figures based on certification alone.^{‡} Sales+streaming figures based on certification alone.

Sales certifications for Celebration Day (video album)
| Region | Certification | Certified units/sales |
|---|---|---|
| Brazil (Pro-Música Brasil) | Platinum | 30,000^{*} |
| Germany (BVMI) | 7× Gold | 175,000^{^} |
| Switzerland (IFPI Switzerland) | Platinum | 6,000^{^} |
| United States (RIAA) | 3× Platinum | 300,000^{^} |
^{*} Sales figures based on certification alone.^{^} Shipments figures based on certification alone.

== See also ==
- Live Aid (1985) – Led Zeppelin's first reunion
- Atlantic Records 40th Anniversary (1988) – Led Zeppelin's second reunion
