= For Your Life =

Song by Led Zeppelin

from the album Presence
- Released: 31 March 1976
- Recorded: November 1975
- Studio: Musicland, Munich, Germany
- Genre: Hard rock; blues rock
- Length: 6:21
- Label: Swan Song
- Songwriters: Jimmy Page; Robert Plant
- Producer: Jimmy Page

"For Your Life" is a song by the English rock band Led Zeppelin, from their 1976 album Presence.

== Overview ==
During the recording of "For Your Life" at Musicland Studios, Led Zeppelin singer Robert Plant was convalescing from a car accident which he had sustained in Greece the previous year, and he delivered his vocal performance from a wheelchair. The song's vocals are notable in part because of the snorting sound heard around 5:30, with the lyrics: "With the fine lines of the crystal payin' through your nose". Plant later explained the song's venom was due in part to his observations of the excessive amount of cocaine which had now pervaded and ruined the music scene in Los Angeles, during his stay on the West Coast prior to recording. The lyrics, written by Plant, indicate that one part of the song also has to do with an unnamed female acquaintance of his, who got drawn into the Los Angeles drug scene, to whom he wags a finger and says "watch it."

Jimmy Page used his 1962 Lake Placid blue Fender Stratocaster for the first time on this track, which was supplied to him by Gene Parsons. Its use is evident in the sounds of its tremolo arm. He would later use it with his band the Firm.

In an interview he gave to rock journalist Cameron Crowe, Page commented on the spontaneous nature of the song's construction, saying that it "was made up in the studio, right on the spot".

== Live renditions ==
This song was never performed live by the band at Led Zeppelin concerts until their reunion show on 10 December 2007 at The O2 in London. For the performance Page played a Gibson Custom Shop replica of his 1960 Gibson Les Paul Custom that was stolen in 1970. An arrangement was also worked out for the Coverdale and Page tour of Japan in 1993, but never executed live.

== Reception ==
In a contemporary review for the Presence album, Stephen Davis of Rolling Stone gave "For Your Life" a negative review, calling the track, along with "Tea for One", as "the two dreary examples of blooze" on Presence.

In a retrospective review of Presence (Deluxe Edition), Andrew Doscas of PopMatters gave "For Your Life" a more positive review. Doscas stated that the track was "one of the brightest hidden gems in the band's entire catalogue", and praised its "powerful" bass line, its "rugged" guitar riff, and its "sardonic" lyrics.

== Personnel ==
According to Jean-Michel Guesdon and Philippe Margotin:

- Robert Plant – vocals
- Jimmy Page – electric guitars
- John Paul Jones – bass
- John Bonham – drums, tambourine

== Bibliography ==
- Case, George (2007). Jimmy Page: Magus, Musician, Man: An Unauthorized Biography (1st ed.). New York: Hal Leonard. ISBN 978-1-4234-0407-1.
- Guesdon, Jean-Michel; Margotin, Philippe (2018). Led Zeppelin All the Songs: The Story Behind Every Track. Running Press. ISBN 978-0-316-448-67-3.
- Lewis, Dave (2003). Led Zeppelin: The 'Tight but Loose' Files: Celebration II (1st ed.). London: Omnibus Press. p. 40. ISBN 1-84449-056-4.
- Lewis, Dave (2004). Led Zeppelin: The Complete Guide to Their Music (1st ed.). London: Omnibus Press. ISBN 1-84449-141-2.
- Shadwick, Keith (2005). Led Zeppelin: The Story of a Band and Their Music 1968–1980 (1st ed.). San Francisco: Backbeat Books. ISBN 0-87930-871-0.
- Welch, Chris (1998). Led Zeppelin: Dazed and Confused: The Stories Behind Every Song. ISBN 1-56025-818-7.
