= Ahmet Ertegun Tribute Concert =

Benefit concert in memory of Ahmet Ertegun

- Benefit concert by Led Zeppelin
- Location: The O2 Arena, London
- Date: 10 December 2007

Led Zeppelin concert chronology
- Tour Over Europe 1980; Ahmet Ertegun Tribute Concert 2007

The Ahmet Ertegun Tribute Concert was a benefit concert held in memory of music executive Ahmet Ertegun at the O2 Arena in London on 10 December 2007. The headline act was the English rock band Led Zeppelin, who performed their first full-length concert in almost three decades, since the death of drummer John Bonham in 1980, in a one-off reunion. Bonham's son Jason Bonham played drums during the band's set and he also sang backing vocals on two songs. This concert is the last time the three living members of the band have performed together.

According to Guinness World Records 2009, the concert holds the world record for the "Highest Demand for Tickets for One Music Concert" as 20 million requests for the reunion show were rendered online.

In October 2012, Celebration Day, a concert film documenting the event, was released. Both the film and performance by Led Zeppelin have been highly acclaimed. A shortened version of the concert was broadcast by the BBC in the UK on 8 December 2012.

== Background ==
On 12 September 2007, it was confirmed during a press conference by promoter Harvey Goldsmith that the surviving members of Led Zeppelin would reunite for the show, with Jason Bonham filling in on drums. The concert was originally scheduled to take place on 26 November 2007. It was to help raise money for the Ahmet Ertegun Education Fund, which pays for university scholarships in the UK, US and Turkey.

Tickets were made available via a lottery system through the website Ahmettribute.com, costing £125 / $250, with all proceeds going to Ahmet's own charity. The website exceeded its bandwidth allowance and crashed almost immediately following the announcement, with the promoter predicting that the gig would cause the "largest demand for one show in history". The promoter claimed that one million people registered for fewer than 20,000 available tickets. Led Zeppelin guitarist Jimmy Page later commented:

I knew it was going to sell out quickly, but the tidal wave of euphoria that preceded the gig—the anticipation—went beyond what I could possibly have imagined. We'd had a few shambolic appearances in the past, like Live Aid, so if we were ever going to come back together, we were going to do it properly and stand up and be counted.

On 1 November 2007, it was announced that Page fractured the little finger on his left hand after a fall in his garden and the reunion show was postponed to 10 December 2007.

== The concert ==
=== Opening acts ===
The show opened with a band consisting of Keith Emerson, Chris Squire, Alan White and Simon Kirke with the brass section from Bill Wyman's Rhythm Kings. They played Emerson, Lake & Palmer's version of "Fanfare for the Common Man", including sections from Yes' "The Fish" and Led Zeppelin's "Kashmir". Initially the openers should have been Squire, White and Rick Wakeman but Wakeman was unavailable for the rescheduled date due to prior commitments and Emerson was called in as a last-minute replacement.

The show also featured Bill Wyman's Rhythm Kings, Paul Rodgers, Paolo Nutini, and Foreigner as supporting acts. The majority of the performance was by the Rhythm Kings, with Nutini and Rodgers both guesting on two songs each. The performance billed as "Foreigner" was in fact only Mick Jones performing "I Want to Know What Love Is" with St. Lukes C of E secondary school as the choir and former Foreigner drummer Brian Tichy and the Rhythm Kings as the backing band. Other guests on the Rhythm Kings set included Maggie Bell and Alvin Lee. Pete Townshend was scheduled to perform as a supporting act, but he pulled out when he heard Led Zeppelin was performing, saying, "They really don't need me." Other acts considered for the show included a reunited Cream.

=== Led Zeppelin ===
The band performed 16 songs—including two encores—from across their career, excluding their final studio album, In Through the Out Door. "We were asked to play a forty-minute set," Jimmy Page remarked during rehearsals. "And we soon realised we couldn't. If we go out and play 'No Quarter', 'Moby Dick' and 'Dazed and Confused' with all the solos, you're already talking over an hour. We've gone from seventy-five minutes to ninety, to the best part of two hours. There's no way I can take on playing three-and-a-half-hour sets now, flying against the winds and the storms, because I just don't have that energy anymore. But I've still got enough to get me through a two-hour set. Coming back to Led Zeppelin's music after all these years, the challenge is to post as much of it as we can. And the question is, Which ones can we actually play?"

Two numbers were played live in their entirety for the first time ever by Led Zeppelin: "Ramble On" and "For Your Life". During rehearsals, John Paul Jones commented, "'For Your Life' feels good, mainly because we've never played it much. It all feels quite fresh to me because I haven't played any of this stuff for years and I never listen to the records at home... Jason makes it more interesting too, because he's not trying to reassemble things exactly the way his father did."

Without Bonham, said Robert Plant, "it would've been a totally different thing because his enthusiasm and points of reference were spectacular – his knowledge of shows that had been performed when he was a tot."

=== Setlist ===
1. "Good Times Bad Times"
2. "Ramble On"
3. "Black Dog"
4. "In My Time of Dying"/"Honey Bee"
5. "For Your Life"
6. "Trampled Under Foot"
7. "Nobody's Fault but Mine"
8. "No Quarter"
9. "Since I've Been Loving You"
10. "Dazed and Confused"
11. "Stairway to Heaven"
12. "The Song Remains the Same"
13. "Misty Mountain Hop"
14. "Kashmir"

First Encore:

15. "Whole Lotta Love"

Second Encore:

16. "Rock and Roll"

The concert sound was mixed by Metallica's FOH engineer Big Mick. In 2012 an album and film were released as Celebration Day.

The concert was also recorded by many fans. Sophisticated bootleg versions of the show are available on the Internet, including a wide-screen DVD with a surround sound audio track mixed from 10 different audience recordings of the show.

The historic concert attracted nearly 20 million fans from all corners of the globe. Because of the enormous demand for tickets, an online lottery system was implemented in which fans entered a random drawing. Eight thousand fans were selected and allowed to purchase the 16,000 tickets that were made available to the public. To combat fears of ticket scalping, lottery winners had to be present in London with ID to pick up their tickets and wristbands for entry. Hundreds of fans with General Admission tickets arrived at the O2 Arena days in advance with the hopes of being front and center for such a landmark occasion.

As the concert was expected to be Led Zeppelin's last, a number of celebrities attended the gig, including Joe Elliott, Chad Smith, Dave Grohl, BBC Radio 1 DJs Chris Moyles & Fearne Cotton, Mark Butler, Brett Hull, Chris Evans, Bob Harris, Ilan Rubin, Paul McCartney, Jeff Beck, Brian May, David Gilmour, Lulu, Oasis brothers Noel and Liam Gallagher, Ann Wilson, Arctic Monkeys, The Edge, Bernard Sumner, Dave Mustaine, Peter Gabriel, John Squire, Mick Jagger, Crown Prince Frederik of Denmark, Matt Morgan, Juliette Lewis, James Dean Bradfield, Richard Hammond, Jeremy Clarkson, Richard Ashcroft, Marilyn Manson, Warren Haynes, Kate Moss, Naomi Campbell, David Boreanaz, W. Earl Brown, Jerry Hall, Priscilla Presley, Paris Hilton, Neil Finn and Mark Kermode (Kermode applied for tickets via the lottery system on the website).

== Critical response ==
Music critics in attendance were unanimous in their praise for Led Zeppelin's performance. New Musical Express proclaimed, "what they have done here tonight is proof that they can still perform to the level that originally earned them their legendary reputation...We can only hope this isn't the last we see of them."

The New Yorker critic Sasha Frere-Jones, who attended the concert wrote, "The failed gigs of the nineteen-eighties and nineties have been supplanted by a triumph, and the band should be pleased to have done Ertegun proud with such a spirited performance."

Members of the band have also expressed their satisfaction with the concert. Page commented that "it was a wonderful celebration of the music, a celebration of the fact that the essence of it, the energy, was still there". He also reflected that "It's great that we did it. I look back on that night with a great amount of fondness, but Jason was the hero. For me that gig was about him."

Plant has stated:

On a musical level, we've had sublime moments and there were several on December 10. Bear in mind that we're old guys now and we're not supposed to be hip-shrugging teenage idols. It was pretty ... I'm not sure 'sincere' is the right word. But it was as real as you're going to get. And Jimmy was on fire at times.

In an interview he gave to The Times in January 2010, Page recalled:

We played really, really well. But we played with a totally different urgency, if you like, from how we played in the rehearsals — although the rehearsals were pretty damn good, too. I suppose in retrospect the fact there was only one gig then it's great that everyone afterwards would say that it was an historic and inspiring gig for people to hear. It is a shame that there weren't any more that followed on and now we got to two years later and everyone's doing their own thing and that's how that is at this point of time or certainly into next year. So that's it.

"There was a Zeppelin swagger, definitely," Jones said. "We knew we were good. At our best, we thought we could be a match for any band on the planet. And at our worst, we were better than most of them."

== See also ==
- List of highest-grossing benefit concerts
