= Kashmir (song) =

1975 song by Led Zeppelin

Song by Led Zeppelin

from the album Physical Graffiti
- Released: 24 February 1975
- Recorded: 1974
- Studio: Ronnie Lane's Mobile Studio, Headley Grange, Hampshire; Olympic, London
- Genre: Progressive rock; hard rock
- Length: 8:37
- Label: Swan Song
- Songwriters: John Bonham; Jimmy Page; Robert Plant
- Producer: Jimmy Page

"Kashmir" is a song by the English rock band Led Zeppelin. Featured on their sixth studio album Physical Graffiti (1975), it was written by Jimmy Page and Robert Plant with contributions from John Bonham over a period of three years with lyrics dating back to 1973. John Paul Jones was late arriving to the studio for the recording sessions, so he did not receive a writer's credit.

The song became a concert staple, performed by the band at almost every concert after its release. It has been described as one of Led Zeppelin's two most overtly progressive epics (the other being "Stairway to Heaven").

== Composition ==
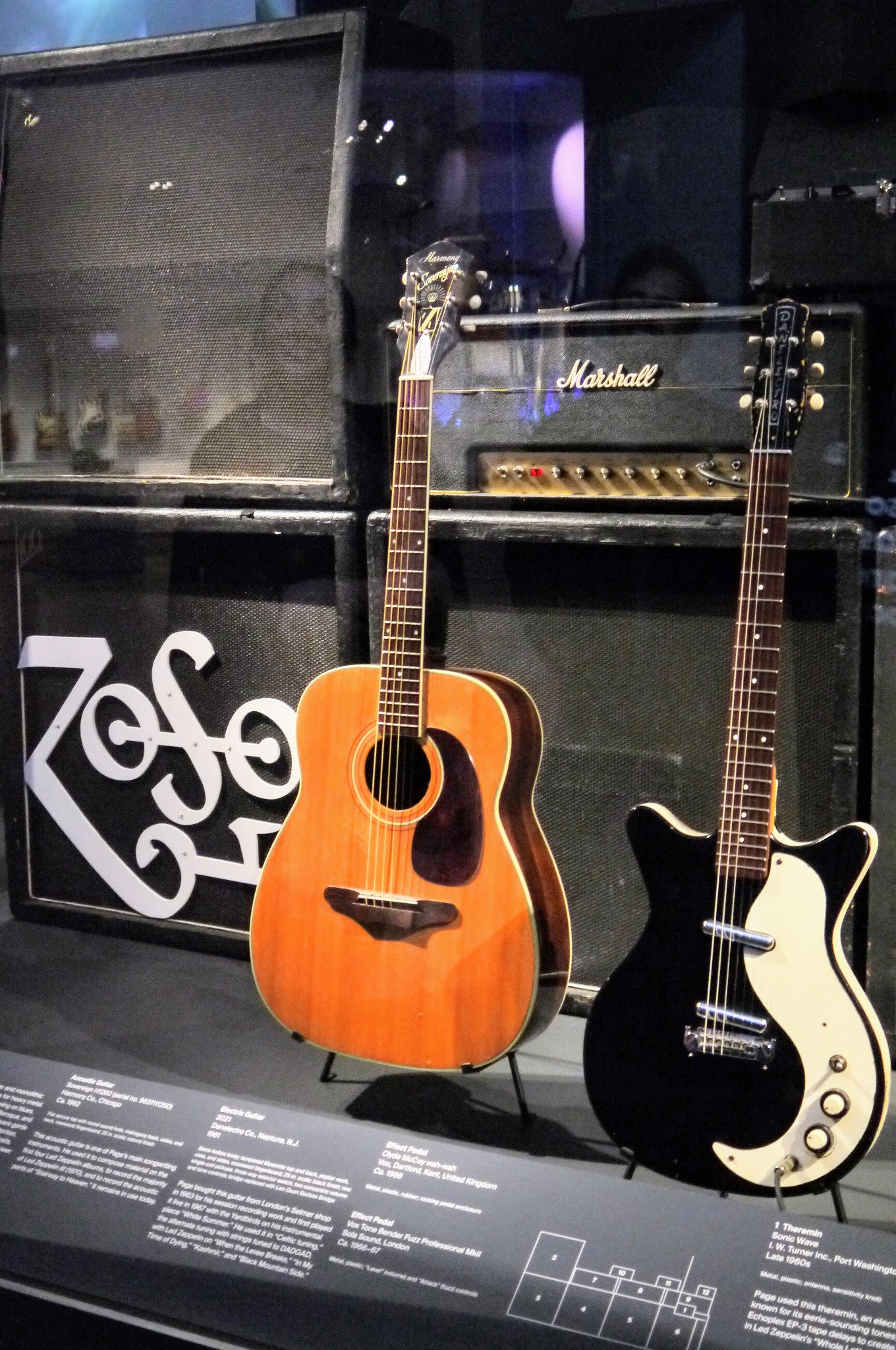
The song was recorded on the Danelectro guitar on the right

Page uses a guitar tuning of D–A–D–G–A–D, which he had used for the instrumentals "White Summer" and "Black Mountain Side". The song combines different rhythmic meters: the guitar riff is in triple meter, while the vocal is in quadruple meter. Plant felt that the drumming was an important component of the song and that Bonham did not overplay his part. "Kashmir" is one of a few Led Zeppelin songs where Page used a Danelectro guitar, rather than his usual Gibson Les Paul or Fender Telecaster models.

Page recorded a demo version with Bonham late in 1973. Plant later added lyrics and a middle section; in early 1974, Jones added orchestration. Session players were brought in for the string and horn sections and Jones added a Mellotron part.

The lyrics were written by Plant in 1973 immediately after Led Zeppelin's 1973 US tour. None of the group members had visited Kashmir. Instead, Plant was inspired during a drive through a desolate desert area of southern Morocco.

== Live performances ==
"Kashmir" was played live at almost every Led Zeppelin concert after its debut in 1975. A version from Knebworth in 1979 appears on the Led Zeppelin DVD (2003). The surviving members performed the song at the Atlantic Records 40th Anniversary concert in 1988.

Page and Plant recorded a longer, live version, with an Egyptian/Moroccan orchestra for No Quarter: Jimmy Page and Robert Plant Unledded (1994) and performed the song with an orchestra on their 1995 tour.

Led Zeppelin, with John Bonham's son Jason on drums, performed "Kashmir" at Led Zeppelin's reunion show at The O2, London on 10 December 2007. That rendition – released on Celebration Day in 2012 – was nominated in 2014 for the Grammy Award for Best Rock Performance at the 56th Grammys. "'Kashmir' actually isn't that difficult", Page remarked during rehearsals for the show. "But it helps to have a drummer who understands the part and a bass player who can play bass with his feet. Sometimes it sounds like John's got three feet. It's intense."

== Reception ==
All four members of Led Zeppelin have agreed that "Kashmir" is one of their best musical achievements. John Paul Jones suggested that it showcases all of the elements that made up the Led Zeppelin sound. Led Zeppelin archivist Dave Lewis comments:

Unquestionably the most startling and impressive track on Physical Graffiti, and arguably the most progressive and original track that Led Zeppelin ever recorded. "Kashmir" went a long way towards establishing their credibility with otherwise skeptical rock critics. Many would regard this track as the finest example of the sheer majesty of Zeppelin's special chemistry.

In a retrospective review of Physical Graffiti (Deluxe Edition), Brice Ezell of PopMatters described "Kashmir" as Physical Graffiti's "quintessential track". Ezell called "Kashmir"'s "doomy ostinato riff and rapturous post-chorus brass/mellotron section" as "inimitable moments in the legacy of classic rock".

== Accolades ==
The song is listed highly in a number of professional music rankings:

| Publication | Country | Accolade | Year | Rank |
|---|---|---|---|---|
| Classic Rock | US | "The Top 50 Classic Rock Songs of All Time" | 1995 | 20 |
| Classic Rock | UK | "10 of the Best Songs Ever!!.. (Bubbling under)" | 1999 | 23 |
| VH1 | US | "The 100 Greatest Rock Songs of All Time" | 2000 | 62 |
| Rolling Stone | US | "The 500 Greatest Songs of All Time" | 2010 | 141 |
| Rolling Stone | US | "The 500 Greatest Songs of All Time" | 2021 | 148 |
| Blender | US | "Standout Tracks from the 500 CDs You Must Own" | 2003 | * |
| Q | UK | "1010 Songs You Must Own!" | 2004 | * |
| Q | UK | "Ultimate Music Collection - Rock" | 2005 | * |
| Q | UK | "100 Greatest Songs of All Time" | 2006 | 74 |
| VH1 | US | "VH1 Greatest Hard Rock Songs" | 2009 | 21 |

(*) designates unordered lists

== Charts and certifications ==
Single (digital download)
| Chart (2007) | Peak position |
|---|---|
| UK Singles Chart (Note: The official UK Singles Chart incorporated legal downloads as of 17 April 2005.) | 80 |
| Swiss Singles Chart | 64 |
| US Billboard Hot Digital Songs Chart | 42 |
| US Billboard Hot Digital Tracks Chart | 49 |
| Canadian Billboard Hot Digital Singles Chart | 33 |

Certifications

| Region | Certification | Certified units/sales |
|---|---|---|
| Italy (FIMI) | Gold | 15,000^{*} |
| United Kingdom (BPI) | Gold | 400,000^{‡} |
^{*} Sales figures based on certification alone.^{‡} Sales+streaming figures based on certification alone.

== Copyright issue ==
The 1988 Schoolly D song "Signifying Rapper", which samples "Kashmir", was the target of lawsuits following its use in the 1992 film Bad Lieutenant. In 1994, Page and Plant successfully sued Home Box Office to have the song removed from televised showings of the film and Live Home Video and distributor Aries Film Releasing were ordered to destroy any unsold copies of Bad Lieutenant as part of a copyright infringement ruling.

== Personnel ==
According to Jean-Michel Guesdon and Philippe Margotin:

- Robert Plant – vocals
- Jimmy Page – electric guitars (six- and twelve-string)
- John Paul Jones – bass, Mellotron
- John Bonham – drums
- Unidentified musicians: strings and brass

== In other media ==
While it is rare for Led Zeppelin songs to appear in other media, the song "Kashmir" briefly is played diegetically in the 1982 movie Fast Times at Ridgemont High (and in the 1981 book on which the movie was based).

== See also ==
- List of cover versions of Led Zeppelin songs – "Kashmir" entries

== Notes ==
Footnotes

Citations

References

- Crowe, Cameron (1993). The Complete Studio Recordings (Boxed set booklet). Led Zeppelin. New York City: Atlantic Records. OCLC 29660775. 82526-2.
- Lewis, Dave (2010). Led Zeppelin: The Complete Guide to Their Music. London: Omnibus Press. ISBN 978-0857121356.
- Macan, Edward (1997). Rocking the Classics: English Progressive Rock and the Counterculture. Oxford University Press. ISBN 978-0195098884.
- Popoff, Martin (2018). Led Zeppelin: All the Albums, All the Songs. Voyageur Press. ISBN 978-0760363775.
- Yorke, Ritchie (1993). Led Zeppelin: The Definitive Biography. Lancaster, PA: Underwood-Miller. ISBN 0-88733-177-7.

== Bibliography ==
- Guesdon, Jean-Michel; Margotin, Philippe (2018). Led Zeppelin All the Songs: The Story Behind Every Track. Running Press. ISBN 978-0-316-448-67-3.
