= Big Mick =

British audio engineer

Mick Hughes
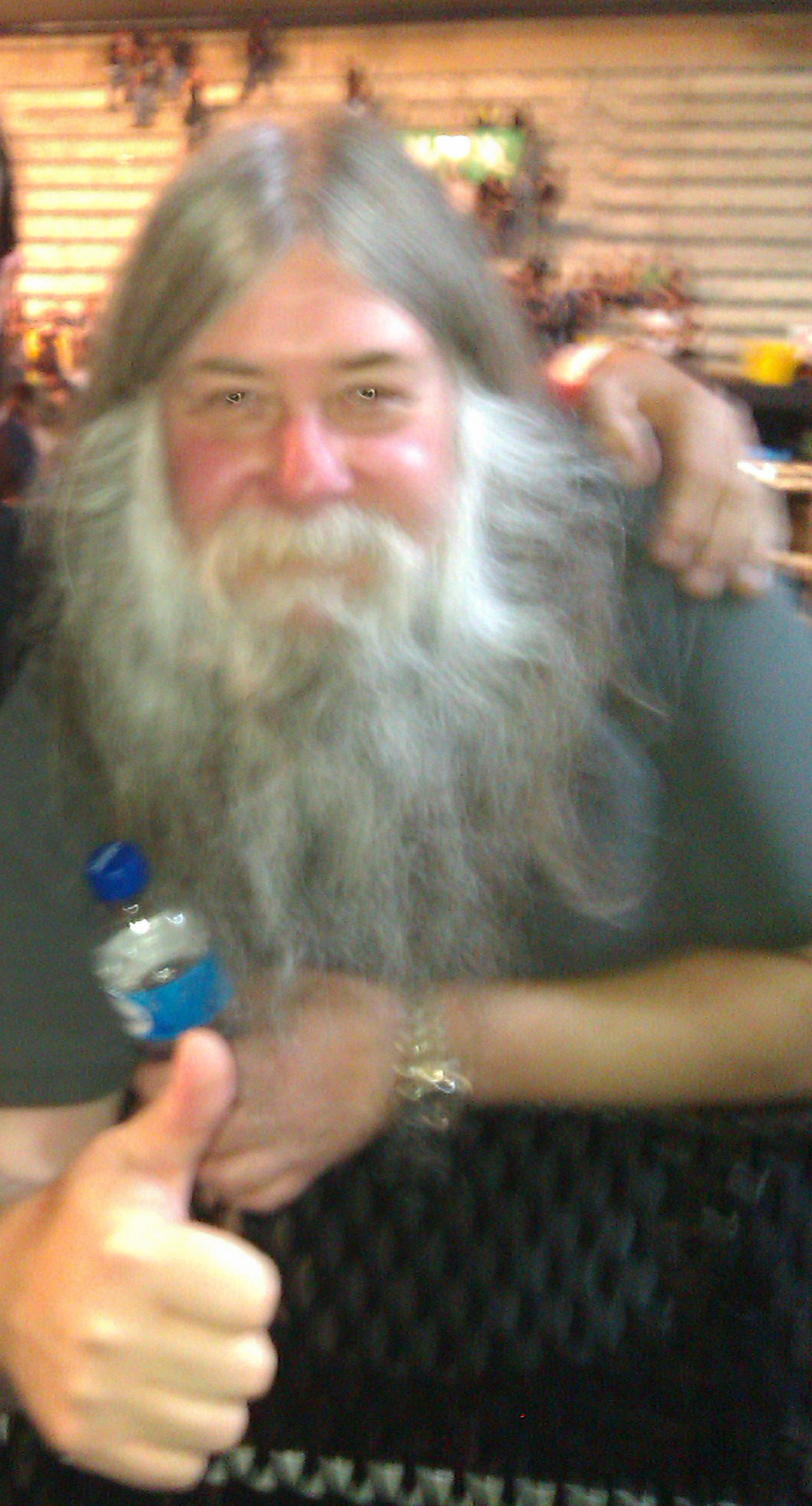
- Born: Mick Hughes; 1960 (age 65–66); Birmingham, England
- Occupation: Audio Engineer
- Years active: 1984 – present

"Big" Mick Hughes (born 1960) is the British live audio engineer for Metallica, a position he has held since 1984. He had to miss the 2021 shows due to post-COVID-19 travel restrictions and was replaced as FOH engineer by Greg Price who continues to mix Metallica on their 2023/2024 M72 World Tour.

He was born in 1960 and grew up in Birmingham, England. While an apprentice at British Steel Corporation, he studied electronics at a local technical college and also gained experience on the thriving Midlands music scene including working as a roadie for Judas Priest. In the early 1980s, working for the PA company Texserv he engineered for bands including UB40, Dennis Brown, Yellowman, and Jungle Man before becoming the touring sound engineer for The Armoury Show, who featured ex The Skids singer Richard Jobson and ex Siouxsie and the Banshees guitarist John McGeoch.

The Armoury Show's management company QPrime then asked Mick to engineer a band they had just signed called Metallica (prompting Mick to ask "What's heavy metal?" when told the genre of music they played) starting a relationship that has lasted nearly 40 years.

Big Mick mixed Metallica at every one of the more than 1500 shows they have performed between their November 1984 tour of Europe and 2020, with one exception: on the Poor Re-Touring Me Tour, Mick was hospitalised with heart palpitations. Michael J "Geese" Graphix, Audio System Engineer for Electrotec and mix engineer for such acts as Guns N' Roses and Nine Inch Nails, stepped in and mixed FOH for two shows: 24 July 1998 in Antioch, Tennessee, and 25 July 1998 in Noblesville, Indiana. Big Mick recovered and continued his reign at the Metallica console. His contract with Metallica supposedly states that he has to be called by his moniker, although amongst the band themselves he is known as Full Roar.

The live mixing technique he is often credited with is adding a high-mid "click" to the bass drum, which evolved early on with Metallica as a means of lifting Lars Ulrich's bass drums out of the bottom heavy sound. A more recent crusade is to encourage engineers to start soundchecks with ambient microphones (such as vocal microphones) working through to close-mic'd or gated instruments such as drums. This is in direct opposition to the usual soundcheck which starts with the kick drum and ends with the vocals, but actually makes a lot of sense since the final sound of any instrument is going to be the combination of the ambient and close microphones.

When not busy with Metallica, Hughes has worked with Halford, Ozzy Osbourne, Def Leppard, Queens of the Stone Age and Steve Vai. He produced the album World Service for the rock band Radio Moscow in 1991. He managed The Wildhearts in the 1990s and has worked with them live and in the studio since their reunion in 2002. After Metallica, the band he is most strongly associated with is Slipknot, who he has worked with between Metallica tours since 2001. He has even done sound for a Slipknot tribute act, Slip-not.

In 2007, he was asked to mix the FOH sound for the Led Zeppelin reunion concert at London's O2 Arena in conjunction with Robert Plant's personal vocal mixer, Roy Williams. They used the facilities of the Midas XL8 digital mixing console to allow them to do this on a single desk. He intentionally did not use the clicky Metallica bass drum sound, preferring instead to update Jason Bonham's ambient and reverberant drum sound by using a mix of close and ambient drum microphones on his kit, brought into phase using a 3 or 4ms delay, and finished with a small amount of digital reverb.
