= Led Zeppelin =

English rock band (1968–1980)

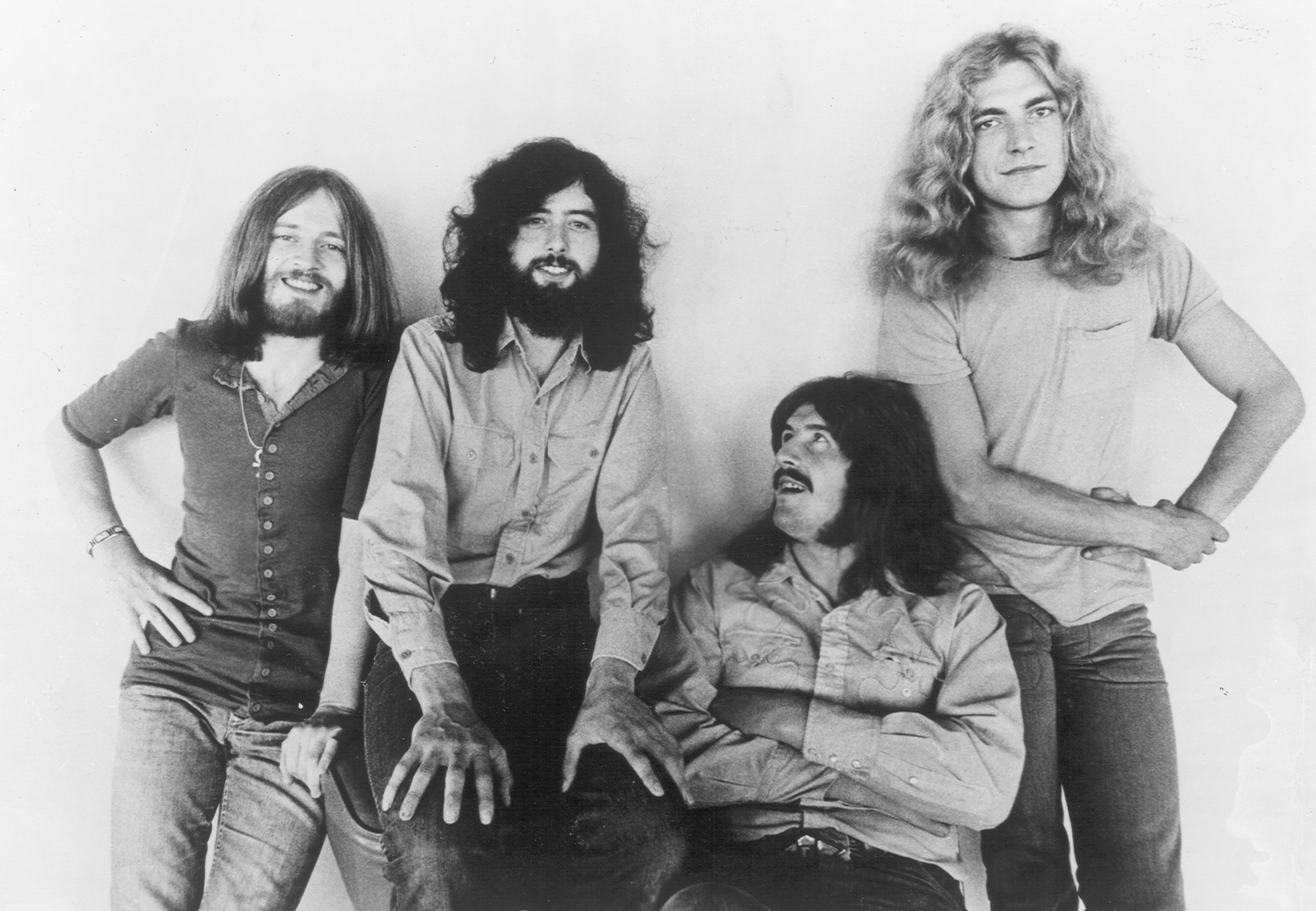
- Led Zeppelin in 1971; From left to right: John Paul Jones, Jimmy Page, John Bonham and Robert Plant

Background information
- Origin: London, England
- Genres: Hard rock; blues rock; folk rock
- Works: Discography; songs; tours
- Years active: 1968–1980 (Note: One-off reunions: 1985, 1988, 1995, 2007)
- Labels: Atlantic; Swan Song
- Spinoffs: The Honeydrippers; Page and Plant; Them Crooked Vultures
- Spinoff of: The Yardbirds; Band of Joy
- Awards: Full list
- Past members: Jimmy Page; Robert Plant; John Bonham; John Paul Jones
- Website: ledzeppelin.com

Led Zeppelin were an English rock band formed in London in 1968. The band comprised vocalist Robert Plant, guitarist Jimmy Page, bass-guitarist and keyboardist John Paul Jones and drummer John Bonham. Their combination of a heavy electric-guitar sound with elements of blues and folk music popularised album-oriented rock and stadium rock and established them as the progenitor of hard rock and heavy metal. They are amongst the best-selling music artists of all time, with an estimated 200 to 300 million records sold worldwide.

Led Zeppelin evolved from a previous band, the Yardbirds, and were originally named "the New Yardbirds". They signed a deal with Atlantic Records that gave them artistic freedom. Although it was initially critically unpopular, their music achieved both critical and commercial success in eight studio albums over ten years.

Their 1969 debut, Led Zeppelin, was a top-ten album in several countries and features such tracks as "Good Times Bad Times", "Dazed and Confused" and "Communication Breakdown". Led Zeppelin II (1969), their first number-one album, includes "Whole Lotta Love", "Heartbreaker", and "Ramble On". In 1970, they released Led Zeppelin III which opens with "Immigrant Song" and contains "Since I've Been Loving You". Their untitled fourth album, which is commonly known as Led Zeppelin IV (1971) and is one of the best-selling albums in history, with 37 million copies sold, includes "Black Dog", "Rock and Roll", "The Battle of Evermore" (which was their only song to feature a guest singer—Sandy Denny), and "Stairway to Heaven", the latter of which is amongst the most popular and influential works of rock music. Houses of the Holy (1973) includes "The Song Remains the Same", "The Rain Song", "Over the Hills and Far Away" and "No Quarter". Physical Graffiti (1975), a double album, features "Trampled Under Foot" and "Kashmir".

Page composed most of Led Zeppelin's music, while Plant wrote most of the lyrics. Jones occasionally originated songs with keyboard parts, particularly on the band's final album. During the first half of the 1970s they performed a series of record-breaking tours that provoked a reputation for hedonism. During the second half of the 1970s, in which they released Presence (1976) and In Through the Out Door (1979), they remained commercially and critically successful but the frequency and quality of their touring declined as a consequence of Page's heroin addiction. They disbanded after Bonham's death from alcoholism in 1980, after which the three surviving members have only sporadically collaborated for concerts, including the 2007 Ahmet Ertegun Tribute Concert in London, which featured Bonham's son Jason Bonham on drums, the recording of which was released to acclaim in 2012 as Celebration Day.

Led Zeppelin achieved eight consecutive UK number-one albums and six number-one albums on the US Billboard 200, with five of their albums certified Diamond in the US by the Recording Industry Association of America (RIAA). Rolling Stone described them as "the heaviest band of all time", "the biggest band of the seventies", and "unquestionably one of the most enduring bands in rock history". They were inducted into the Rock and Roll Hall of Fame in 1995: its museum's biography states that Led Zeppelin were "as influential" in the 1970s as the Beatles were in the 1960s. In 2025, Forbes magazine ranked Led Zeppelin as the best rock band of all time.

== History ==
=== Formation: 1966–1968 ===
The band's logotype, used since 1973

In 1966, London-based session guitarist Jimmy Page joined the blues-influenced rock band the Yardbirds to replace bassist Paul Samwell-Smith. Page soon switched from bass to lead guitar, creating a dual-lead-guitar lineup with Jeff Beck. Following Beck's departure in October 1966, the Yardbirds became a four-piece with Page as the sole guitarist. This new line-up recorded an album, Little Games, in 1967, before embarking on a tour of the United States. In early April 1968, the Yardbirds held a recording session at Columbia Studios in New York City, recording a number of tracks including a Page-Relf composition initially titled "Knowing That I'm Losing You", which was eventually re-recorded by Led Zeppelin as "Tangerine".

The Yardbirds' 1968 tour proved to be exhausting for the band. Drummer Jim McCarty and vocalist Keith Relf aimed to move in a more acoustic direction, forming a folk rock duo which would eventually evolve into the group Renaissance. Page, on the other hand wanted to continue the heavier blues-based sound he had established with the Yardbirds. With the support of the Yardbirds' new manager Peter Grant, Page planned to form a supergroup with Beck and himself on guitars, and The Who's Keith Moon and John Entwistle on drums and bass, respectively. Vocalists Steve Winwood and Steve Marriott were also considered for the project. The group never formed, although Page, Beck, and Moon had recorded a song together in 1966, "Beck's Bolero", in a session that also included bassist-keyboardist John Paul Jones.

The Yardbirds played their final gig on 7 July 1968 at Luton College of Technology in Bedfordshire. They were still committed to several concerts in Scandinavia, so McCarty and Relf authorised Page and bassist Chris Dreja to use the Yardbirds' name to fulfill the band's obligations. Page and Dreja began putting a new line-up together. Page's first choice for the lead singer was Terry Reid, but Reid declined the offer and suggested Robert Plant, a singer for the Band of Joy and Hobbstweedle. Plant eventually accepted the position, recommending former Band of Joy drummer John Bonham. John Paul Jones enquired about the vacant position of bass guitarist, at the suggestion of his wife, after Dreja dropped out of the project to become a photographer. (Note: Dreja would later take the photograph that appeared on the back of Led Zeppelin's debut album.) Page had known Jones since they were both session musicians, and agreed to let him join as the final member.

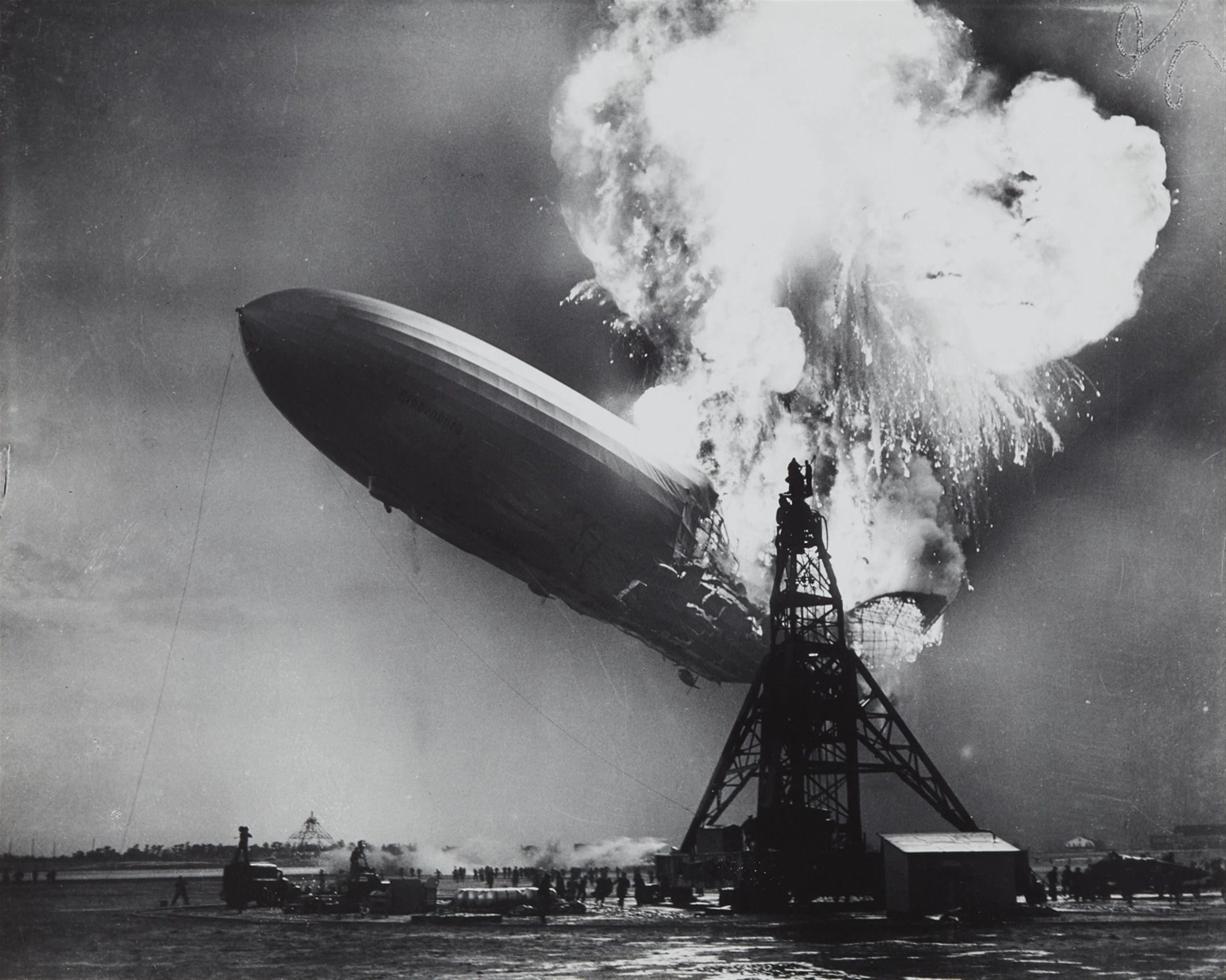
A 1937 photograph of the burning LZ 129 Hindenburg taken by news photographer Sam Shere, used on the cover of the band's debut album and extensively on later merchandise

In August 1968, the four played together for the first time in a room below a record store on Gerrard Street in London. Page suggested that they attempt "Train Kept A-Rollin'", originally a jump blues song popularised in a rockabilly version by Johnny Burnette, which had been covered by the Yardbirds. "As soon as I heard John Bonham play", Jones recalled, "I knew this was going to be great ... We locked together as a team immediately". Before leaving for Scandinavia, the group took part in a recording session for the P. J. Proby album Three Week Hero. The album's track "Jim's Blues", with Plant on harmonica, was the first studio track to feature all four future members of Led Zeppelin.

The band completed the Scandinavian tour as the New Yardbirds, playing together for the first time in front of a live audience at Gladsaxe Teen Club at the Egegård School (today Gladsaxe School) festive hall, Gladsaxe, Denmark, on 7 September 1968. Later that month, they began recording their first album, which was based on their live set. The album was recorded and mixed in nine days, and Page covered the costs. After the album's completion, the band were forced to change their name after Dreja issued a cease and desist letter, stating that Page was allowed to use the New Yardbirds moniker for the Scandinavian dates only. One account of how the new band's name was chosen held that Moon and Entwistle had suggested that a supergroup with Page and Beck would go down like a "lead balloon", an idiom for being very unsuccessful or unpopular. The group dropped the 'a' in lead at the suggestion of Peter Grant, so that those unfamiliar with the term would not pronounce it "leed". The word "balloon" was replaced by "zeppelin", a word which, according to music journalist Keith Shadwick, brought "the perfect combination of heavy and light, combustibility and grace" to Page's mind.

Grant secured a $143,000 advance contract ($1,324,000 today) from Atlantic Records in November 1968—at the time, the biggest deal of its kind for a new band. Atlantic was a label with a catalogue of mainly blues, soul, and jazz artists, but in the late 1960s, it began to take an interest in British progressive rock acts. At the recommendation of British singer Dusty Springfield, a friend of Jones who at the time was completing her first Atlantic album, Dusty in Memphis, record executives signed Led Zeppelin without having ever seen them. Under the terms of their contract, the band had autonomy in deciding when they would release albums and tour and had the final say over the contents and design of each album. They would also decide how to promote each release and which tracks to release as singles. They formed their own company, Superhype, to handle all publishing rights.

=== Early years: 1968–1970 ===
Still billed as the New Yardbirds, the band began their first tour of the UK on 4 October 1968, when they played at the Mayfair Ballroom in Newcastle upon Tyne. Their first show as Led Zeppelin was at the University of Surrey in Guildford on 25 October. Tour manager Richard Cole, who would become a major figure in the touring life of the group, organised their first North American tour at the end of the year. (Note: The first show was in Denver on 26 December 1968, followed by other West Coast dates before the band travelled to California to play Los Angeles and San Francisco.) Their debut album, Led Zeppelin, was released in the US in January 1969 during the tour, and peaked at number 10 on the Billboard chart; it was released in the UK, where it peaked at number 6, on 31 March. According to Steve Erlewine, the album's memorable guitar riffs, lumbering rhythms, psychedelic blues, groovy, bluesy shuffles and hints of English folk music made it "a significant turning point in the evolution of hard rock and heavy metal".

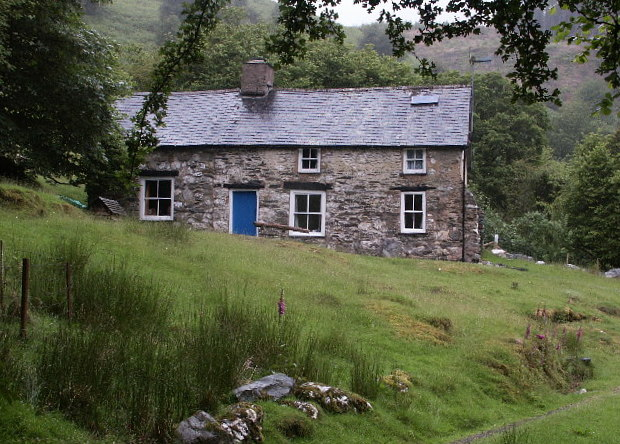
Bron-Yr-Aur, near Machynlleth, the Welsh cottage to which Page and Plant retired in 1970 to write many of the tracks that appeared on the band's third and fourth albums

In their first year, Led Zeppelin completed four US and four UK concert tours, and also released their second album, Led Zeppelin II. Recorded mostly on the road at various North American studios, it was an even greater commercial success than their first album and reached the number one chart position in the US and the UK. The album further developed the mostly blues-rock musical style established on their debut release, creating a sound that was "heavy and hard, brutal and direct", and which would be highly influential and frequently imitated. Steve Waksman has suggested that Led Zeppelin II was "the musical starting point for heavy metal".

The band saw their albums as indivisible, complete listening experiences, disliking the re-editing of existing tracks for release as singles. Grant maintained an aggressive pro-album stance, particularly in the UK, where there were few radio and TV outlets for rock music. Without the band's consent, however, some songs were released as singles, particularly in the US. In 1969, an edited version of "Whole Lotta Love", a track from their second album, was released as a single in the US. It reached number four in the Billboard chart in January 1970, selling over one million copies and helping to cement the band's popularity. The group also increasingly shunned television appearances, citing their preference that their fans hear and see them in live concerts.

Following the release of their second album, Led Zeppelin completed several more US tours. They played initially in clubs and ballrooms, and then in larger auditoriums as their popularity grew. Some early Led Zeppelin concerts lasted more than four hours, with expanded and improvised live versions of their repertoire. Many of these shows have been preserved as bootleg recordings. It was during this period of intensive concert touring that the band developed a reputation for off-stage excess. (Note: One alleged example of such extravagance was the shark episode said to have taken place at the Edgewater Inn in Seattle on 28 July 1969.)

In 1970, Page and Plant retired to Bron-Yr-Aur, a remote cottage in Wales, to commence work on their third album, Led Zeppelin III. The result was a more acoustic style that was strongly influenced by folk and Celtic music, and showcased the band's versatility. The album's rich acoustic sound initially received mixed reactions, with critics and fans surprised at the turn from the primarily electric arrangements of the first two albums, further fuelling the band's hostility to the musical press. It reached number one in the UK and US charts, but its stay would be the shortest of their first five albums. The album's opening track, "Immigrant Song", was released as a US single in November 1970 against the band's wishes, reaching the top twenty on the Billboard chart.

Page played his 1959 Dragon Telecaster until a friend stripped Page's custom modifications and repainted the guitar. From 1969 onwards the mahogany "Number 1" Les Paul has been Page's main guitar.

=== "The Biggest Band in the World": 1970–1975 ===
During the 1970s, Led Zeppelin reached new heights of commercial and critical success that made them one of the most influential groups of the era, eclipsing their earlier achievements. The band's image also changed as the members began to wear elaborate, flamboyant clothing, with Page taking the lead on the flamboyant appearance by wearing a glittering moon-and-stars outfit. Led Zeppelin changed their show by using things such as lasers, professional light shows and mirror balls. They began travelling in a private jet airliner, a Boeing 720 (nicknamed the Starship), rented out entire sections of hotels (including the Continental Hyatt House in Los Angeles, known colloquially as the "Riot House"), and became the subject of frequently repeated stories of debauchery. One involved John Bonham riding a motorcycle through a rented floor of the Riot House, while another involved the destruction of a room in the Tokyo Hilton, leading to the group being banned from that establishment for life. Although Led Zeppelin developed a reputation for trashing their hotel suites and throwing television sets out of the windows, some suggest that these tales have been exaggerated. According to music journalist Chris Welch, "[Led Zeppelin's] travels spawned many stories, but it was a myth that [they] were constantly engaged in acts of wanton destruction and lewd behaviour".

Led Zeppelin's Four Symbols (Note: According to a Chris Welch: "I tried to guess which symbol represented which member of the group. And according to Bonzo – got them right. Three strong circles represent Bonham, a feather in a circle for Robert, linked ovals for John Paul and artistic lettering for Jimmy. Guest artist Sandy Denny was symbolised with three inverted pyramids.")

The band in 1971

Led Zeppelin released their fourth album on 8 November 1971. The album is officially untitled but variously referred to as Led Zeppelin IV, Untitled, IV, or, due to the four symbols appearing on the record label, as Four Symbols, Zoso or Runes. The band had wanted to release the fourth album with no title or information, in response to the music press "going on about Zeppelin being a hype", but the record company wanted something on the cover, so in discussions, it was agreed to have four symbols to represent both the four members of the band and that it was the fourth album. With 37 million copies sold, Led Zeppelin IV is one of the best-selling albums in history, and its massive popularity cemented Led Zeppelin's status as superstars in the 1970s. By 2021, it had sold 24 million copies in the United States alone. The track "Stairway to Heaven", never released as a single, was the most requested and most played song on American rock radio in the 1970s. The group followed up the album's release with tours of the UK, Australasia, North America, Japan, and the UK again from late 1971 through early 1973.

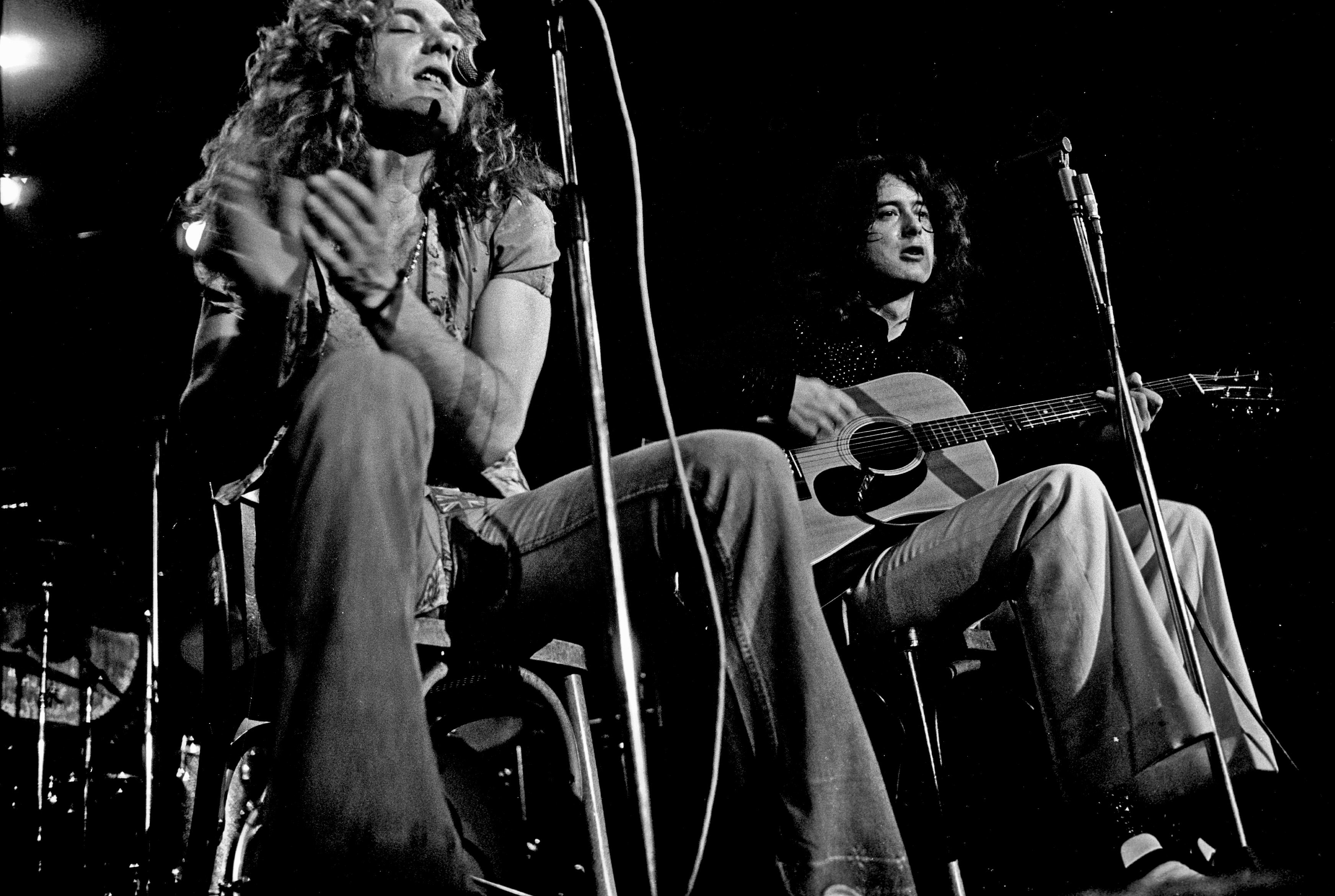
Plant and Page during an acoustic performance in Hamburg in March 1973, just before the release of the band's fifth album, Houses of the Holy.

Led Zeppelin's next album, Houses of the Holy, was released in March 1973. It featured further experimentation by the band, who expanded their use of synthesisers and mellotron orchestration. The predominantly orange album cover, designed by the London-based design group Hipgnosis, depicts images of nude children climbing the Giant's Causeway in Northern Ireland. Although the children are not shown from the front, the cover was controversial at the time of the album's release. As with the band's fourth album, neither their name nor the album title was printed on the sleeve.

Houses of the Holy topped charts worldwide, and the band's subsequent concert tour of North America in 1973 broke records for attendance, as they consistently filled large auditoriums and stadiums. At Tampa Stadium in Florida, they played to 56,800 fans, breaking the record set by the Beatles' 1965 Shea Stadium concert and grossing $309,000. Three sold-out shows at Madison Square Garden in New York City were filmed for a motion picture, but the theatrical release of this project (The Song Remains the Same) was delayed until 1976. Before the final night's performance, $180,000 ($1,305,000 today) of the band's money from gate receipts was stolen from a safe deposit box at the Drake Hotel.

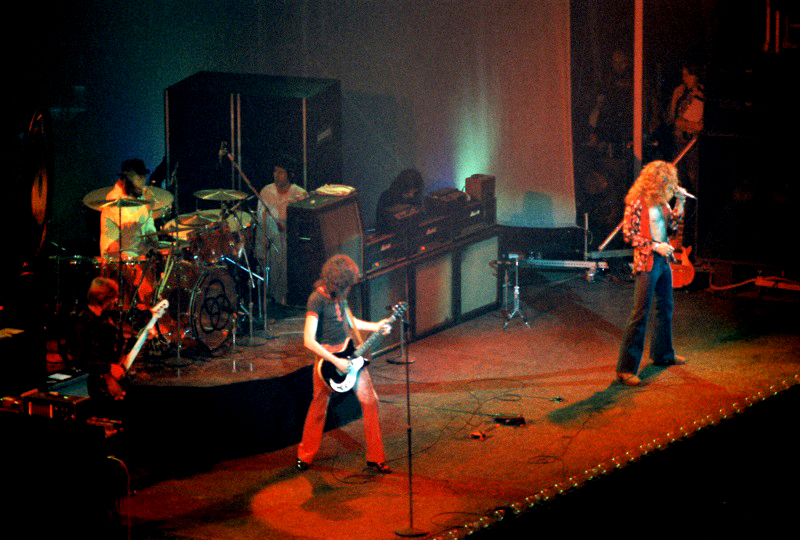
Led Zeppelin perform at Chicago Stadium in January 1975, a few weeks before the release of Physical Graffiti.

In 1974, Led Zeppelin took a break from touring and launched their own record label, Swan Song, named after an unreleased song. The record label's logo is based on a drawing called Evening: Fall of Day (1869) by William Rimmer. The drawing features a figure of a winged human-like being interpreted as either Apollo or Icarus. The logo can be found on Led Zeppelin memorabilia, especially T-shirts. In addition to using Swan Song as a vehicle to promote their own albums, the band expanded the label's roster, signing artists such as Bad Company, the Pretty Things and Maggie Bell. The label was successful while Led Zeppelin existed, but folded less than three years after they disbanded.

In 1975, Led Zeppelin's double album Physical Graffiti was their first release on the Swan Song label. It consisted of fifteen songs, of which eight had been recorded at Headley Grange in 1974 and seven had been recorded earlier. A review in Rolling Stone magazine referred to Physical Graffiti as Led Zeppelin's "bid for artistic respectability", adding that the only bands Led Zeppelin had to compete with for the title "The World's Best Rock Band" were the Rolling Stones and the Who. The album was a massive commercial and critical success. Shortly after the release of Physical Graffiti, all previous Led Zeppelin albums simultaneously re-entered the top-200 album chart, and the band embarked on another North American tour, now employing sophisticated sound and lighting systems. In May 1975, Led Zeppelin played five sold-out nights at the Earls Court Arena in London, at the time the largest arena in Britain.

=== Hiatus from touring and return: 1975–1977 ===
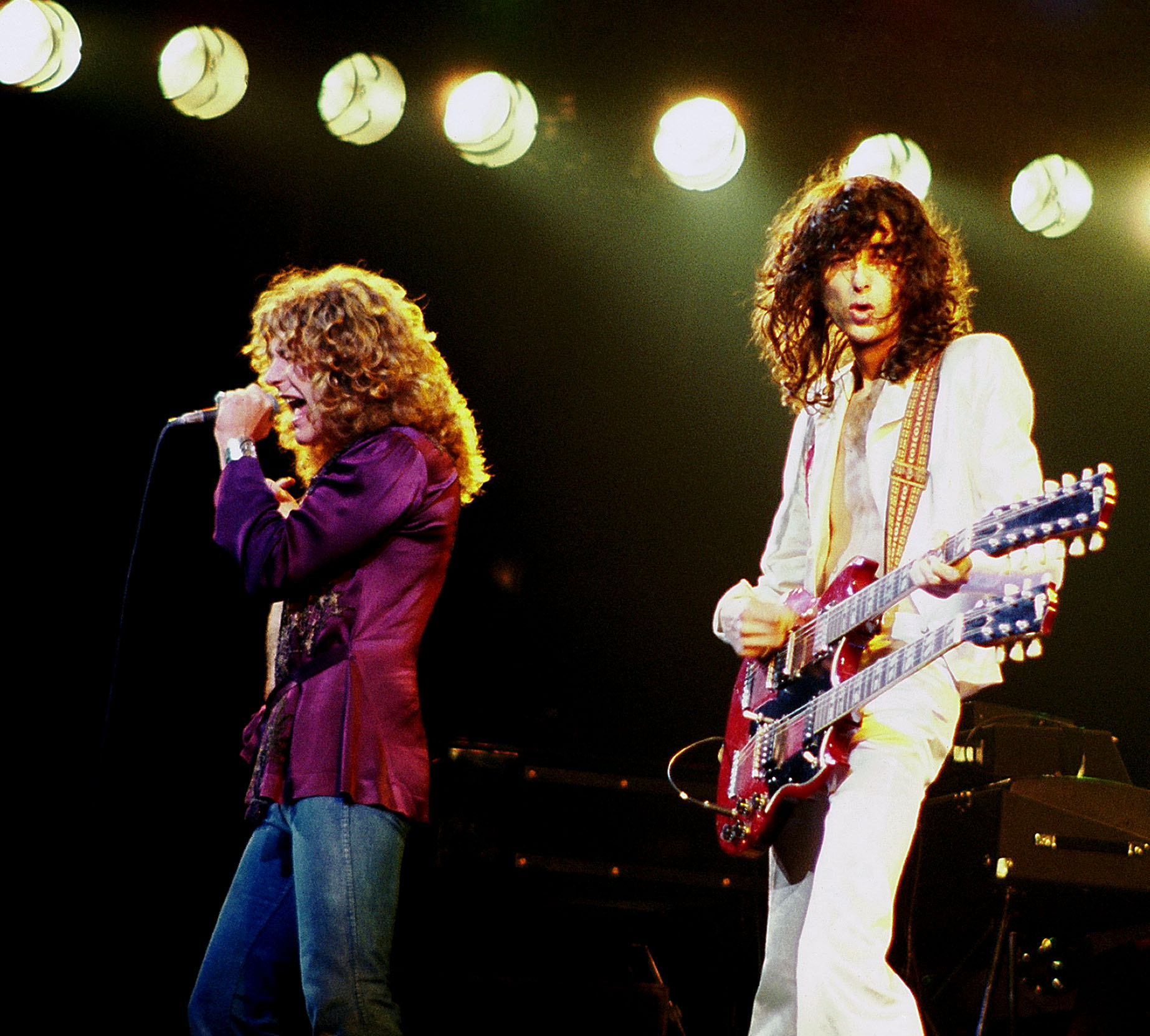
Plant and Page performing at Chicago Stadium in Chicago on 10 April 1977, during Led Zeppelin's last North American tour

Following their triumphant Earls Court appearances, Led Zeppelin took a holiday and planned an autumn tour in America, scheduled to open with two outdoor dates in San Francisco. In August 1975, however, Plant and his wife Maureen were involved in a serious car crash while on holiday in Rhodes, Greece. Plant suffered a broken ankle and Maureen was badly injured; a blood transfusion saved her life. Unable to tour, he headed to the Channel Island of Jersey to spend August and September recuperating, with Bonham and Page in tow. The band then reconvened in Malibu, California. During this forced hiatus, much of the material for their next album, Presence, was written.

By this time, Led Zeppelin were the world's number one rock attraction, having outsold most bands of the time, including the Rolling Stones. Presence, released in March 1976, marked a change in the Led Zeppelin sound towards more straightforward, guitar-based jams, departing from the acoustic ballads and intricate arrangements featured on their previous albums. Though it was a platinum seller, Presence received a mixed reaction among fans and the music press, with some critics suggesting that the band's excesses may have caught up with them. Page had been using heroin regularly since 1975 and relied on it during the rapid recording sessions for the album, a habit which affected the band's later live shows and studio recordings, although he has since denied this.

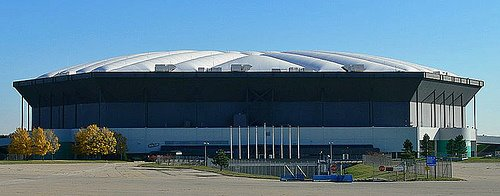
The Pontiac Silverdome, Michigan, where the band set a record for the largest solo indoor attraction in 1977 with an attendance of 76,229

Because of Plant's injuries, Led Zeppelin did not tour in 1976. Instead, the band completed the concert film The Song Remains the Same and the accompanying soundtrack album. The film premiered in New York City on 20 October 1976, but was given a lukewarm reception by critics and fans. The film was particularly unsuccessful in the UK, where, unwilling to tour since 1975 because of their tax exile status, Led Zeppelin faced an uphill battle to recapture the public's affection.

In 1977, Led Zeppelin embarked on another major concert tour of North America. The band set another attendance record, with an audience of 76,229 at their Silverdome concert on 30 April. It was, according to the Guinness Book of Records, the largest attendance to that date for a single act show. Although the tour was financially profitable, it was beset by off-stage problems. On 19 April, over 70 people were arrested as about 1,000 fans tried to gatecrash Cincinnati Riverfront Coliseum for two sold-out concerts, while others tried to gain entry by throwing rocks and bottles through glass doors. On 3 June, a concert at Tampa Stadium was cut short because of a severe thunderstorm, despite tickets indicating "Rain or Shine". A riot broke out, resulting in arrests and injuries.

After the 23 July show at the Day on the Green festival at the Oakland Coliseum in Oakland, California, Bonham and members of Led Zeppelin's support staff were arrested after a member of promoter Bill Graham's staff was badly beaten during the band's performance by Zeppelin manager Peter Grant and one of his security staff, John Bindon. The following day's second Oakland concert was the group's final live appearance in the United States. Two days later, as they checked in at a French Quarter hotel for their 30 July performance at the Louisiana Superdome, Plant received news that his five-year-old son, Karac, had died from a stomach virus. The rest of the tour was immediately cancelled, prompting widespread speculation about Led Zeppelin's future.

=== Bonham's death and break-up: 1978–1980 ===
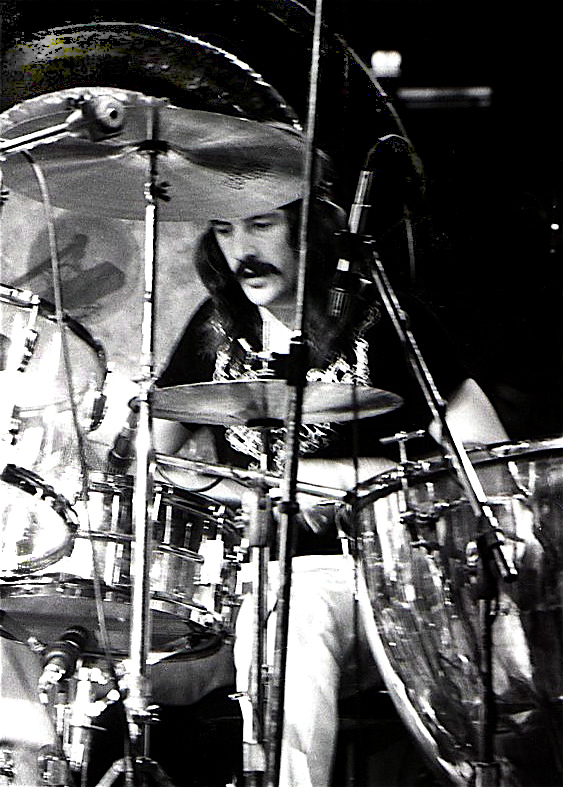
After the death of Bonham (pictured in July 1973) on 25 September 1980, the remaining members of Led Zeppelin decided to disband the group.

In November 1978, the group recorded at Polar Studios in Stockholm, Sweden. The resulting album, In Through the Out Door, featured sonic experimentation that again drew mixed reactions from critics. Nevertheless, the album reached number one in the UK and the US in just its second week of release. With this album's release, Led Zeppelin's entire catalogue returned to the Billboard Top 200 in the weeks of 27 October and 3 November 1979.

In August 1979, after two warm-up shows in Copenhagen, Led Zeppelin headlined two concerts at the Knebworth Music Festival, playing to a crowd of approximately 104,000 on the first night. A brief, low-key European tour was undertaken in June and July 1980, featuring a stripped-down set without the usual lengthy jams and solos. On 27 June, at a show in Nuremberg, West Germany, the concert came to an abrupt halt in the middle of the third song, when Bonham collapsed onstage and was rushed to hospital. Speculation in the press suggested that his collapse had been the result of excessive alcohol and drug use, but the band claimed that he had simply overeaten.

A North American tour, the band's first since 1977, was scheduled to commence on 17 October 1980. On 24 September, Bonham was picked up by Led Zeppelin assistant Rex King to attend rehearsals at Bray Studios. During the journey, Bonham asked to stop for breakfast, where he downed four quadruple vodkas (from 16 to 24 US fl oz (470 to 710 ml)), with a ham roll. After taking a bite of the ham roll he said to his assistant, "breakfast". He continued to drink heavily after arriving at the studio. The rehearsals were halted late that evening and the band retired to Page's house—the Old Mill House in Clewer, Windsor.

After midnight, Bonham, who had fallen asleep, was taken to bed and placed on his side. At 1:45 pm the next day, Benji LeFevre (Led Zeppelin's new tour manager) and John Paul Jones found Bonham dead. The cause of death was asphyxiation from vomit; the finding was accidental death. An autopsy found no other recreational drugs in Bonham's body. Although he had recently begun to take Motival (a cocktail of the antipsychotic fluphenazine and the tricyclic antidepressant nortriptyline) to combat his anxiety, it is unclear if these substances interacted with the alcohol in his system. Bonham's remains were cremated and his ashes interred on 12 October 1980, at Rushock parish church, Worcestershire.

The planned North American tour was cancelled, and despite rumours that Cozy Powell, Carmine Appice, Barriemore Barlow, Simon Kirke, Ric Lee or Bev Bevan would join the group as his replacement, the remaining members decided to disband. A 4 December 1980 press statement stated that, "We wish it to be known that the loss of our dear friend, and the deep sense of undivided harmony felt by ourselves and our manager, have led us to decide that we could not continue as we were." The statement was signed simply "Led Zeppelin".

=== Post-breakup ===
==== 1980s ====
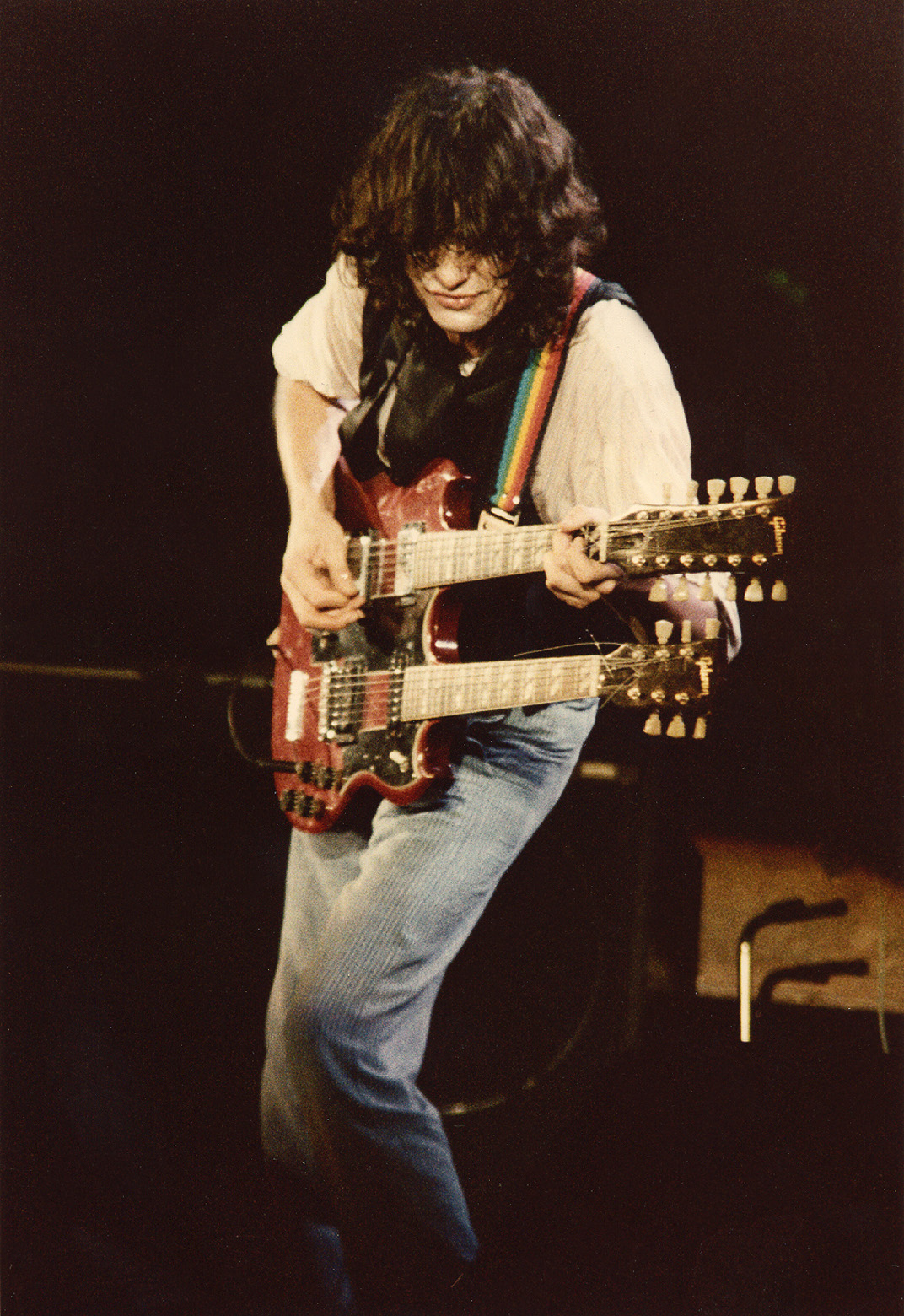
Page performs at the Cow Palace in Daly City, California in 1983.

The studio album Coda – a collection of Zeppelin outtakes and unused tracks – was issued in November 1982. It included two tracks from the Royal Albert Hall in 1970, one each from the Led Zeppelin III and Houses of the Holy sessions, and three from the In Through the Out Door sessions. It also featured a 1976 Bonham drum instrumental with electronic effects added by Page, called "Bonzo's Montreux".

The first significant post-breakup musical project by Led Zeppelin members was the Honeydrippers, formed by Plant in 1981. The group featured Page on lead guitar along with studio musicians and friends of the pair, including Jeff Beck, Paul Shaffer, and Nile Rodgers. It released one EP, in 1984. Plant focused on a different direction from Zeppelin, playing standards and in a more R&B style, highlighted by a cover of "Sea of Love" that peaked at number three on the Billboard chart in early 1985.

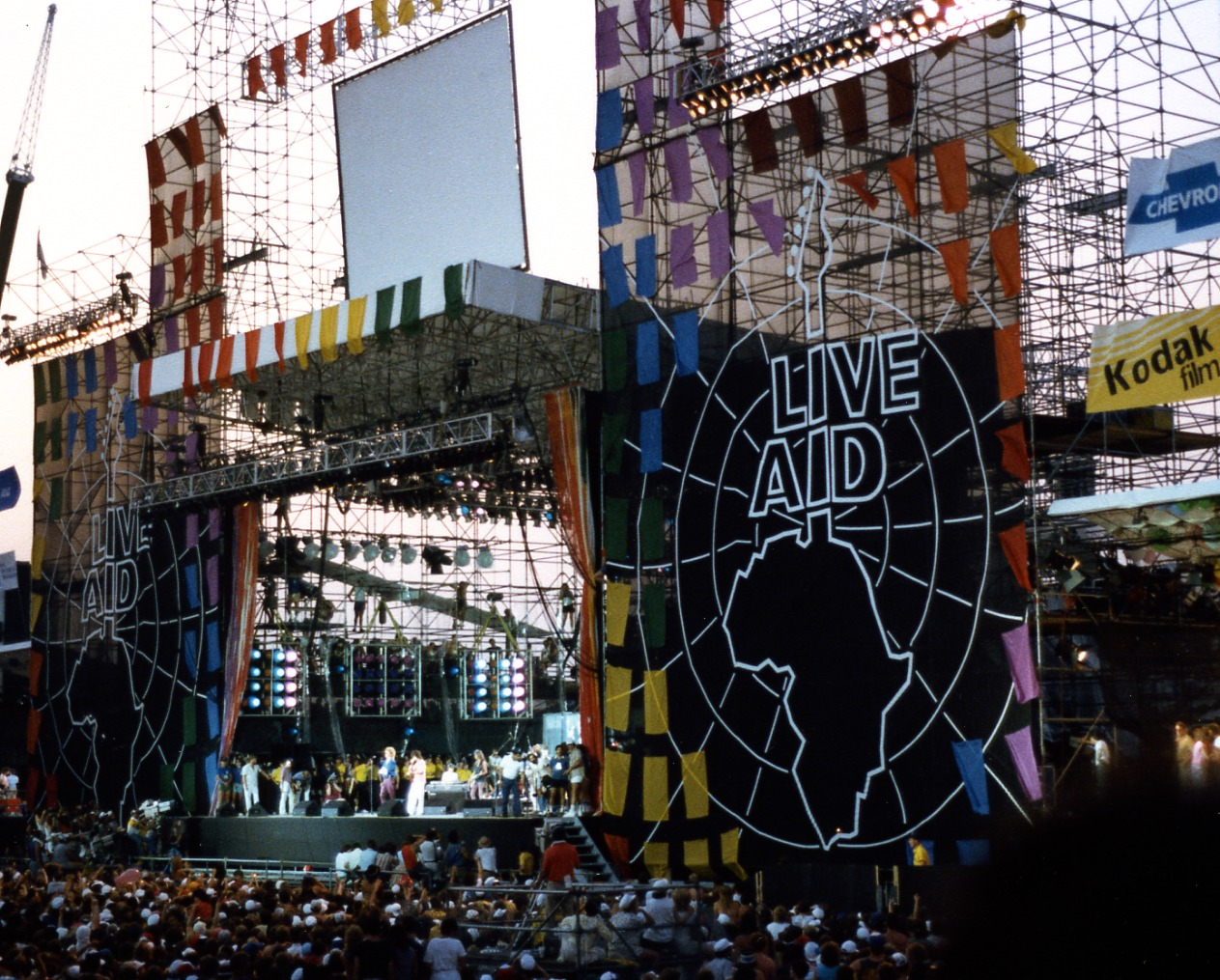
Page, Plant, and Jones performing at Live Aid in Philadelphia

On 13 July 1985, Page, Plant, and Jones reunited for the Live Aid concert at JFK Stadium, Philadelphia, playing a short set with drummers Tony Thompson and Phil Collins and bassist Paul Martinez. Collins had contributed to Plant's first two solo albums; Martinez was a member of Plant's solo band. The performance was marred by a lack of rehearsal with the two drummers, Page's struggles with an out-of-tune guitar, poorly functioning monitors, and Plant's hoarse voice. Page described the performance as "pretty shambolic", while Plant characterised it as an "atrocity".

The three members reunited again on 14 May 1988, for the Atlantic Records 40th Anniversary concert, with Bonham's son Jason on drums. The result was again disjointed: Plant and Page had argued immediately before taking the stage about whether to play "Stairway to Heaven", and Jones' keyboards were absent from the live television feed. Page described the performance as "one big disappointment" and Plant said "the gig was foul".

==== 1990s ====
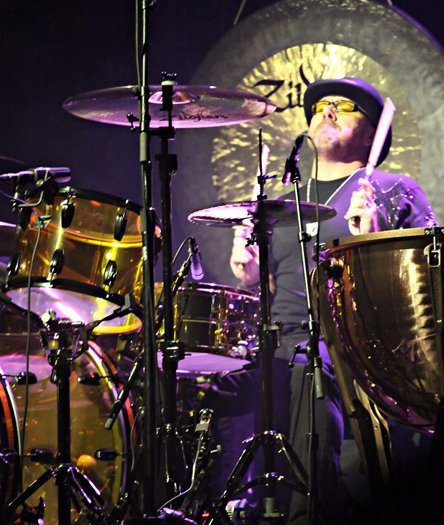
Jason Bonham, who filled his late father's position for reunions in 1988, 1995 and 2007

The first Led Zeppelin box set, featuring tracks remastered under Page's supervision, was released in 1990 and bolstered the band's reputation, leading to abortive discussions among members about a reunion. This set included four previously unreleased tracks, including a version of Robert Johnson's "Travelling Riverside Blues". The song peaked at number seven on the Billboard Album Rock Tracks chart. Led Zeppelin Boxed Set 2 was released in 1993; the two box sets together contained all known studio recordings, as well as some rare live tracks.

In 1994, Page and Plant reunited for a 90-minute "UnLedded" MTV project. They later released an album called No Quarter: Jimmy Page and Robert Plant Unledded, which featured some reworked Led Zeppelin songs, and embarked on a world tour the following year. This is said to be the beginning of a rift between the band members, as Jones was not even told of the reunion.

In 1995, Led Zeppelin were inducted into the United States Rock and Roll Hall of Fame by Steven Tyler and Joe Perry of Aerosmith. Jason and Zoë Bonham also attended, representing their late father. At the induction ceremony, the band's inner rift became apparent when Jones joked upon accepting his award, "Thank you, my friends, for finally remembering my phone number", causing consternation and awkward looks from Page and Plant. Afterwards, they played one brief set with Tyler and Perry, with Jason Bonham on drums, and then a second with Neil Young, this time with Michael Lee playing the drums.

In 1997, Atlantic released a single edit of "Whole Lotta Love" in the US and the UK, the only single the band released in their homeland, where it peaked at number 21. November 1997 saw the release of Led Zeppelin BBC Sessions, a two-disc set largely recorded in 1969 and 1971. Page and Plant released another album called Walking into Clarksdale in 1998, featuring all new material, but after disappointing sales, the partnership dissolved before a planned Australian tour.

==== 2000s ====
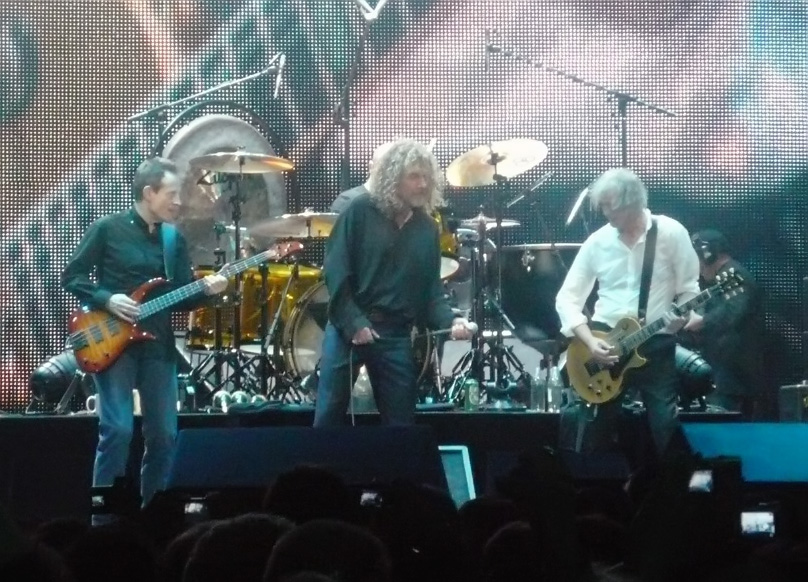
Led Zeppelin performing at the Ahmet Ertegun Tribute Concert in London in December 2007

The year 2003 saw the release of the triple live album How the West Was Won, and Led Zeppelin DVD, a six-hour chronological set of live footage that became the best-selling music DVD in history. In July 2007, Atlantic/Rhino and Warner Home Video announced three Zeppelin titles to be released that November: Mothership, a 24-track best-of spanning the band's career; a reissue of the soundtrack The Song Remains the Same, including previously unreleased material; and a new DVD. Zeppelin also made their catalogue legally available for download, becoming one of the last major rock bands to do so.

On 10 December 2007, Zeppelin reunited for the Ahmet Ertegun Tribute Concert at the O_{2} Arena in London, with Jason Bonham again taking his father's place on drums. According to Guinness World Records 2009, the show set a record for the "Highest Demand for Tickets for One Music Concert" as 20 million requests were submitted online. Critics praised the performance and there was widespread speculation about a full reunion. Page, Jones and Jason Bonham were reported to be willing to tour and to be working on material for a new Zeppelin project. Plant continued his touring commitments with Alison Krauss, stating in September 2008 that he would not record or tour with the band. "I told them I was busy and they'd simply have to wait," he recalled in 2014. "I would come around eventually, which they were fine with – at least to my knowledge. But it turns out they weren't. And what's even more disheartening, Jimmy used it against me."

Jones and Page reportedly looked for a replacement for Plant; candidates including Steven Tyler of Aerosmith, and Myles Kennedy of Alter Bridge. However, in January 2009, it was confirmed that the project had been abandoned. "Getting the opportunity to play with Jimmy Page, John Paul Jones and Jason Bonham was pretty special," Kennedy recalled. "That is pretty much the zenith right there. That was a crazy, good experience. It's something I still think of often ... It's so precious to me."

==== 2010s ====
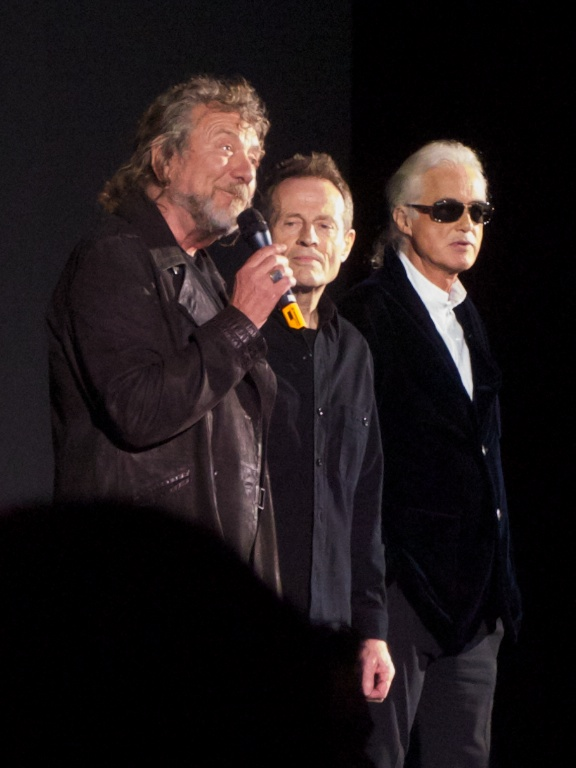
Led Zeppelin answering questions at the film premiere of Celebration Day at the Hammersmith Apollo in London, October 2012

A film of the O2 performance, Celebration Day, premiered on 17 October 2012 and was released on DVD on 19 November. The film grossed $2 million in one night, and the live album peaked at number 4 and 9 in the UK and US, respectively. Following the film's premiere, Page revealed that he had been remastering the band's discography. The first wave of albums, Led Zeppelin, Led Zeppelin II, and Led Zeppelin III, were released on 2 June 2014. The second wave of albums, Led Zeppelin IV and Houses of the Holy, were released on 27 October 2014. Physical Graffiti was released on 23 February 2015, almost exactly forty years to the day after the original release. The fourth and final wave of studio album reissues, Presence, In Through the Out Door, and Coda, were released on 31 July 2015.

Through this remastering project, each studio album was reissued on CD and vinyl and was also available in a Deluxe Edition, which contained a bonus disc of previously unheard material (Coda's Deluxe Edition would include two bonus discs). Each album was also available in a Super Deluxe Edition Box Set, which included the remastered album and bonus disc on both CD and 180-gram vinyl, a high-definition audio download card of all content at 96 kHz/24 bit, a hardbound book filled with rare and previously unseen photos and memorabilia, and a high-quality print of the original album cover.

On 6 November 2015, the Mothership compilation was reissued using the band's newly remastered audio tracks. The reissuing campaign continued the next year with the re-release of BBC Sessions on 16 September 2016. The reissue contained a bonus disc with nine unreleased BBC recordings, including the heavily bootlegged but never officially released "Sunshine Woman".

To commemorate the band's 50th anniversary, Page, Plant and Jones announced an official illustrated book celebrating 50 years since the formation of the band. Also released for the celebration was a reissue of How the West Was Won on 23 March 2018, which includes the album's first pressing on vinyl. For Record Store Day on 21 April 2018, Led Zeppelin released a 7" single "Rock and Roll" (Sunset Sound Mix)/"Friends" (Olympic Studio Mix), their first single in 21 years.

==== 2020s ====
In October 2020, Page released a photo collection called Jimmy Page: The Anthology, in which it was confirmed a documentary was in the works for the band's 50th anniversary. In 2025, Led Zeppelin's formation and first year was chronicled in the musical documentary Becoming Led Zeppelin, directed by Bernard MacMahon and produced by Allison McGourty. It was the first time the band's members had agreed to participate in a biographical documentary. The completed film premiered in IMAX in several countries on 7 February 2025.

== Artistry ==
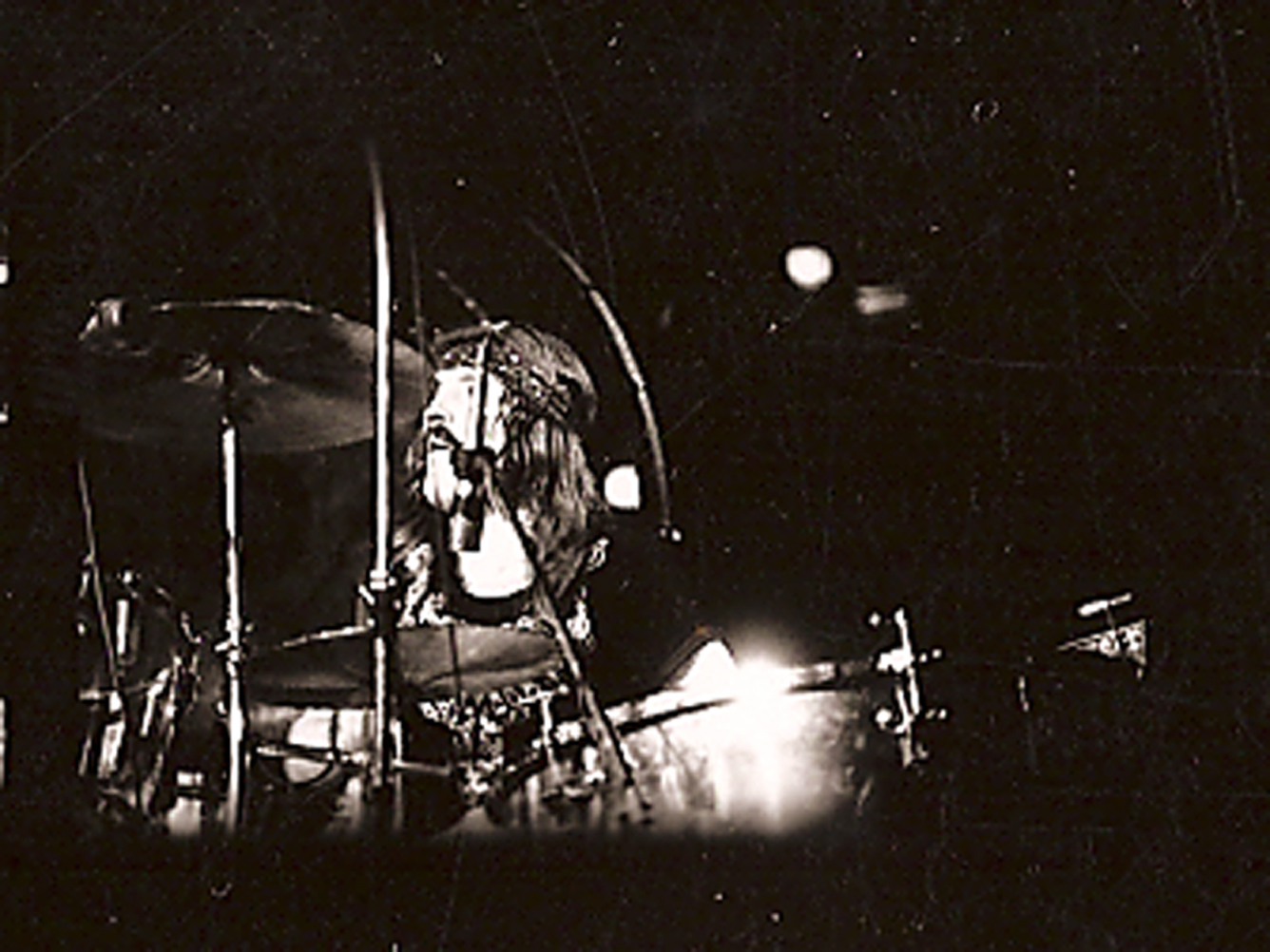
John Bonham's aggressive drumming style was critical to the hard rock sound associated with the band.

Led Zeppelin's music was rooted in the blues. The influence of American blues artists such as Muddy Waters and Skip James was particularly apparent on their first two albums, as was the distinct country blues style of Howlin' Wolf. There were tracks structured around the twelve-bar blues on every studio album except for one, and the blues directly and indirectly influenced other songs both musically and lyrically. The band were also strongly influenced by the music of the British, Celtic, and American folk revivals. Scottish folk guitarist Bert Jansch helped inspire Page, and from him he adapted open tunings and aggressive strokes into his playing. The band also drew on a wide variety of genres, including world music, and elements of early rock and roll, jazz, country, funk, soul, and reggae, particularly on Houses of the Holy and the albums that followed.

The material on the first two albums was largely constructed out of extended jams of blues standards and folk songs. Page recounted the process, saying "We didn't over-rehearse things. We just had them so that they were just right, so that there was this tension – maybe there might be a mistake. But there won't be, because this is how we're all going to do it and it's gonna work!" This method led to musical and lyrical elements from different songs and versions, as well as improvised passages, being mixed together to create new material—which would also lead to later accusations of plagiarism and legal disputes over copyright. Usually the music was developed first, sometimes with improvised lyrics that might then be rewritten for the final version of the song. From the visit to Bron-Yr-Aur in 1970, the songwriting partnership between Page and Plant became predominant, with Page supplying the music, largely via his acoustic guitar, and Plant emerging as the band's chief lyricist. Jones and Bonham then added to the material, in rehearsal or in the studio, as a song was developed. In the later stages of the band's career, Page took a back seat in composition and Jones became increasingly important in producing music, often composed on the keyboard. Plant then added lyrics before Page and Bonham developed their parts.

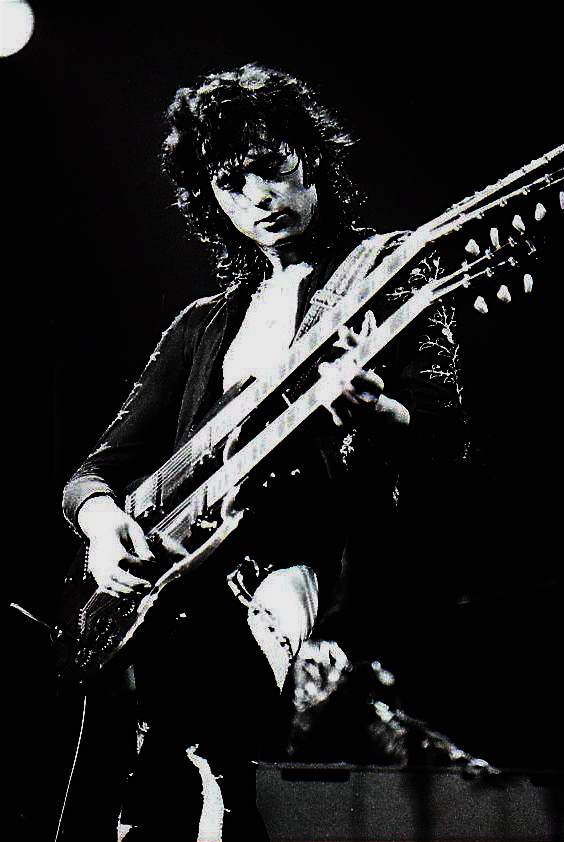
Page with the double-neck Gibson EDS-1275 used for playing "Stairway to Heaven" among other songs live

Early lyrics drew on the band's blues and folk roots, often mixing lyrical fragments from different songs. Many of the band's songs dealt with themes of romance, unrequited love and sexual conquest, which were common in rock, pop and blues music. Some of their lyrics, especially those derived from the blues, have been interpreted as misogynistic. Particularly on Led Zeppelin III, they incorporated elements of mythology and mysticism into their music, which largely grew out of Plant's interest in legends and history. These elements were often taken to reflect Page's interest in the occult, which resulted in accusations that the recordings contained subliminal satanic messages, some of which were said to be contained in backmasking; these claims were generally dismissed by the band and music critics. The pastoral fantasies in Plant's songwriting were inspired by the landscape of the Black Country region and J. R. R. Tolkien's high fantasy novel The Lord of the Rings. Susan Fast argues that as Plant emerged as the band's main lyricist, the songs more obviously reflected his alignment with the West Coast counterculture of the 1960s. In the later part of the band's career Plant's lyrics became more autobiographical, and less optimistic, drawing on his own experiences and circumstances.

According to musicologist Robert Walser, "Led Zeppelin's sound was marked by speed and power, unusual rhythmic patterns, contrasting terraced dynamics, singer Robert Plant's wailing vocals, and guitarist Jimmy Page's heavily distorted crunch". These elements mean that they are often cited as one of the originators of hard rock and heavy metal and they have been described as the "definitive heavy metal band", although the band members have often eschewed the label. Led Zeppelin, together with Deep Purple and Black Sabbath, have been referred to as the "unholy trinity of British hard rock and heavy metal in the early to mid- seventies". Part of this reputation depends on the band's use of distorted guitar riffs on songs like "Whole Lotta Love" and "The Wanton Song". Often riffs were not doubled by guitar, bass and drums exactly, but instead there were melodic or rhythmic variations. Page's guitar playing incorporated elements of the blues scale with those of eastern music. Plant's use of high-pitched shrieks has been compared to Janis Joplin's vocal technique. Robert Christgau found him integral to the group's heavy "power blues" aesthetic, functioning as a "mechanical effect" similarly to Page's guitar parts. While noting Plant "hints at real feeling" on some of their acoustic songs, Christgau believed he abandoned traditional blues singing's emphasis on emotional projection in favour of vocal precision and dynamics: "Whether he is mouthing sexist blues cliches or running through one of the band's half-audible, half-comprehensible ... lyrics about chivalry or the counter-culture, his voice is devoid of feeling. Like the tenors and baritones of yore, he wants his voice to be an instrument—specifically, an electric guitar." Bonham's drumming was noted for its power, his rapid rolls and his fast beats on a single bass drum; while Jones' basslines have been described as melodic and his keyboard playing added a classical touch to the band's sound.

At some deep level, Led Zeppelin's music is about the relationship between humanity and technology. Philosophically, the band prefers humanity pure and simple, but in practice it must realize its humanity technologically. That seems truer than most good-time pastoral fantasies.

— Robert Christgau, 1972

Led Zeppelin have been widely viewed as a hard rock band, although Christgau regarded them as art rock as well. According to popular music scholar Reebee Garofalo, "because hip critics could not find a constructive way of positioning themselves in relation to Led Zeppelin's ultra-macho presentation, they were excluded from the art rock category despite their broad range of influences." Christgau wrote in 1972, the band could be considered art rock because they "relate to rock and roll not organically but intellectually", idealising the "amplified beat" as "a kind of formal challenge". Unlike their contemporaries in Jethro Tull and Yes, who use "the physical compulsion of beat and volume to involve the mind", Led Zeppelin "make body music of an oddly cerebral cast, arousing aggression rather than sexuality." As such, along with other second-generation English hard rock bands like Black Sabbath and Mott the Hoople, they can attract both intellectuals and working-class youths in "a strange potential double audience". Years later, In Through the Out Door's "tuneful synthesizer pomp" further confirmed for Christgau they were an art rock band.

Page stated that he wanted Led Zeppelin to produce music that had "light and shade", and held the belief that instrumentation could be used to "set the scene". This began to be more clearly realised beginning with Led Zeppelin III, which made greater use of acoustic instruments. This approach has been seen as exemplified in the fourth album, particularly on "Stairway to Heaven", which begins with acoustic guitar and recorder and ends with drums and heavy electric sounds. Page was quoted saying, "The music is lyrical without lyrics. The lyrics are telling a story and they're conveying a situation or a person or a reflection or an observation, and the construction of the music I felt was doing the same sort of thing. It was lyrical in the way it was being played." Towards the end of their recording career, they moved to a more mellow and progressive sound, dominated by Jones' keyboard motifs. They also increasingly made use of various layering and production techniques, including multi-tracking and overdubbed guitar parts. Their emphasis on the sense of dynamics and ensemble arrangement has been seen as producing an individualistic style that transcends any single music genre. Ian Peddie argues that they were "... loud, powerful and often heavy, but their music was also humorous, self-reflective and extremely subtle". Page stated that the band's albums were intended to be taken as a whole. He was quoted saying, "We were crafting albums for the album market. It was important, I felt, to have the flow and the rise and fall of the music and the contrast, so that each song would have more impact against the other."

== Legacy ==
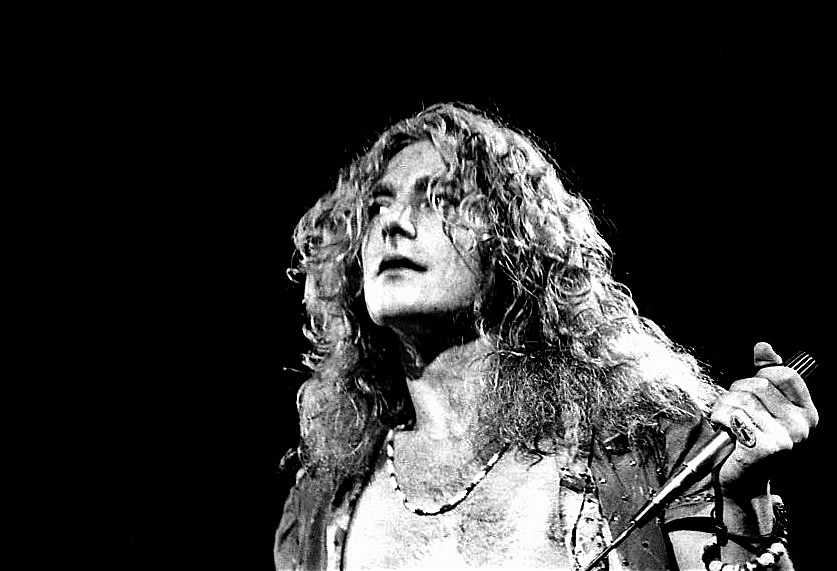
Plant's vocal style has been highly influential in rock music, while his mane of long blond hair and powerful, bare-chested appearance, helped to create the "rock god" archetype. A 2011 Rolling Stone readers' pick named him the "Best Lead Singer of All Time".

Led Zeppelin is widely regarded as one of the most successful, innovative, and influential bands in the history of rock music. Rock critic Mikal Gilmore said, "Led Zeppelin—talented, complex, grasping, beautiful and dangerous—made one of the most enduring bodies of composition and performance in twentieth-century music, despite everything they had to overpower, including themselves".

Led Zeppelin have influenced hard rock and heavy metal bands such as Deep Purple, Black Sabbath, Rush, Queen, Scorpions, Aerosmith, the Black Crowes, and Megadeth as well as progressive metal bands like Tool and Dream Theater. Jeff Mezydlo of Yardbarker wrote, "While Black Sabbath and Deep Purple also influenced a hard, guitar-driven sound that opened the door for the heavy metal movement, Zeppelin did it better than anybody." The band also influenced some early punk and post-punk bands, among them the Ramones, Joy Division and the Cult. They were also an important influence on the development of alternative rock, as bands adapted elements from the "Zeppelin sound" of the mid-1970s, including the Smashing Pumpkins, Nirvana, Pearl Jam, and Soundgarden. Bands and artists from diverse genres have acknowledged the influence of Led Zeppelin, such as Madonna, Shakira, Lady Gaga, Kesha, and Katie Melua.

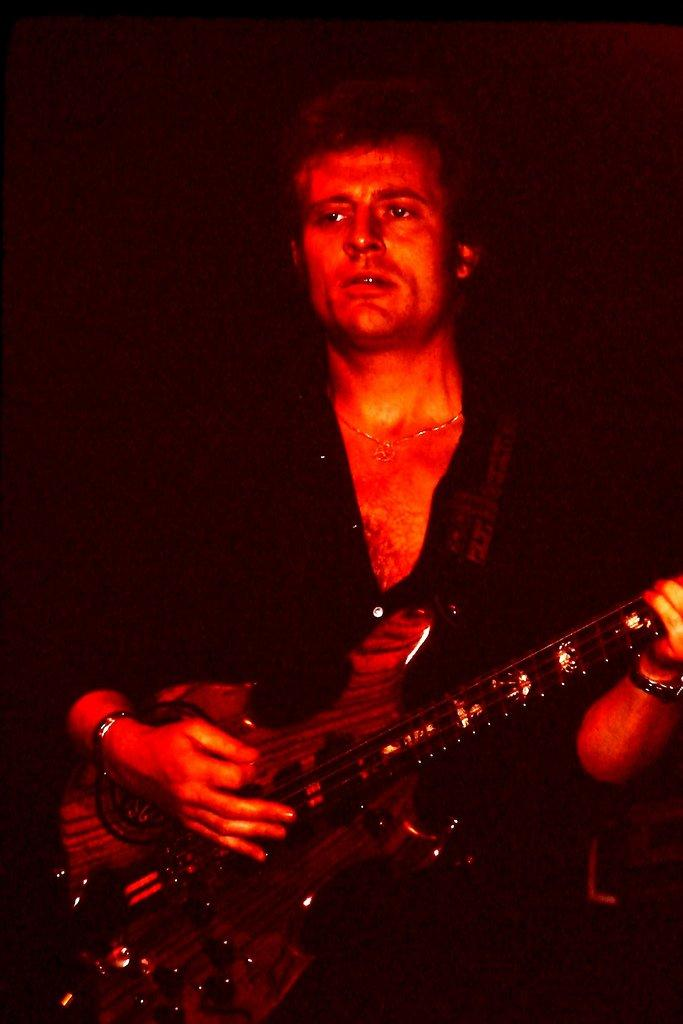
Jones performing with the band in Mannheim, West Germany in 1980 on their last tour

Led Zeppelin influenced the music business, particularly in the development of album-oriented rock (AOR) and stadium rock. In 1988, John Kalodner, then-Geffen Records A&R executive, said, "Next to the Beatles they're the most influential band in history. They influence the way music is on records, AOR radio, concerts. They set the standards for the AOR-radio format with 'Stairway to Heaven,' having AOR hits without necessarily having Top 40 hits. They're the ones who did the first real big arena concert shows, consistently selling out and playing stadiums without support. People can do as well as them, but nobody surpasses them." Andrew Loog Oldham, the former producer and manager of the Rolling Stones, said Led Zeppelin influenced the record business and the way rock concerts were managed and presented to huge audiences. In 2007, they were a featured artist in the stadium rock episode of the BBC/VH1 series Seven Ages of Rock.

The band have sold over 200 million albums worldwide, according to some sources, while others state that they have sold more than 300 million records, including 111.5 million certified units in the United States. According to the Recording Industry Association of America, Led Zeppelin are the third-highest-selling band, the fifth highest selling music act in the US, and one of only four acts to earn five or more Diamond albums. They achieved eight consecutive number-ones on the UK Albums Chart, a record for most consecutive UK number-one albums shared with ABBA. Led Zeppelin remain one of the most bootlegged artists in the history of rock music.

Led Zeppelin greatly influenced culture. Jim Miller, editor of Rolling Stone Illustrated History of Rock & Roll, argues that "on one level, Led Zeppelin represents the final flowering of the sixties' psychedelic ethic, which casts rock as passive sensory involvement". Led Zeppelin have also been described as "the quintessential purveyors" of masculine and aggressive "cock rock", although this assertion has been challenged. The band's fashion-sense has been seminal; Simeon Lipman, head of pop culture at Christie's auction house, has commented that "Led Zeppelin have had a big influence on fashion because the whole aura surrounding them is so cool, and people want a piece of that". Led Zeppelin laid the foundation for the big hair of the 1980s glam metal bands such as Mötley Crüe and Skid Row. Other musicians have also adapted elements from Led Zeppelin's attitude to clothes, jewellery and hair, such as the hipster flares and tight band T-shirts of Kings of Leon, shaggy hair, clingy T-shirts and bluesman hair of Jack White of the White Stripes, and Kasabian guitarist Sergio Pizzorno's silk scarves, trilbies and side-laced tight jeans.

== Achievements ==
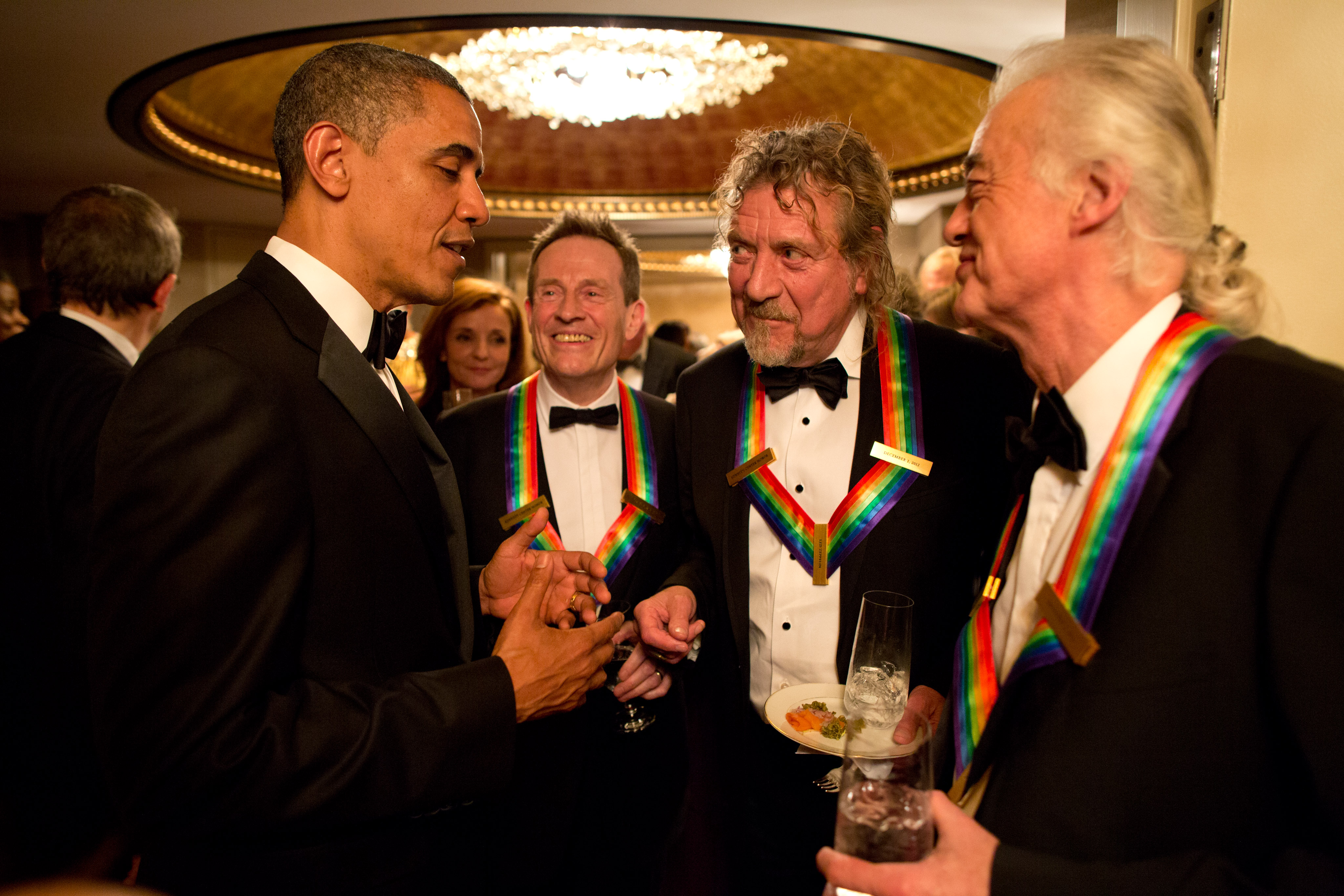
Led Zeppelin were honoured by US President Barack Obama at the 2012 Kennedy Center Honors.

Led Zeppelin have collected many honours and awards. They were inducted into the Rock and Roll Hall of Fame in 1995, and the UK Music Hall of Fame in 2006. Among the band's awards are an American Music Award in 2005, and the Polar Music Prize in 2006. Led Zeppelin received a Grammy Lifetime Achievement Award in 2005; Four of their recordings have been inducted into the Grammy Hall of Fame. They have been awarded five Diamond albums, as well as fourteen Multi-Platinum, four Platinum and one Gold album in the United States, while in the UK they have five Multi-Platinum, six Platinum, one Gold and four Silver albums. Rolling Stone named Led Zeppelin the 14th-greatest artist of all time in 2004.

In 2003, Rolling Stone's 500 Greatest Albums of All Time list included Led Zeppelin at number 29, Led Zeppelin IV at number 66, Physical Graffiti at number 70, Led Zeppelin II at number 75, and Houses of the Holy at number 149. And in 2004, on their 500 Greatest Songs of All Time list, Rolling Stone included "Stairway to Heaven" at number 31, "Whole Lotta Love" at number 75, "Kashmir" at number 140, "Black Dog" at number 294, "Heartbreaker" at number 320, and "Ramble On" at number 433.

In 2005, Page was appointed an Officer of the Order of the British Empire in recognition of his charity work, and in 2009 Plant was honoured as a Commander of the Order of the British Empire for his services to popular music. The band are ranked number one on VH1's 100 Greatest Artists of Hard Rock and Classic Rock's "50 best live acts of all time". They were named as the best Rock band in a poll by BBC Radio 2. They were awarded an Ivor Novello Award for "Outstanding Contribution to British Music" in 1977, as well as a "Lifetime Achievement Award" at the 42nd Annual Ivor Novello awards ceremony in 1997. The band were honoured at the 2008 MOJO Awards with the "Best Live Act" prize for their one-off reunion, and were described as the "greatest rock and roll band of all time". In 2010, Led Zeppelin IV was one of ten classic album covers from British artists commemorated on a UK postage stamp issued by the Royal Mail; they were unveiled by Jimmy Page. Led Zeppelin were named as 2012 recipients of the Kennedy Center Honors.

== Band members ==
- Robert Plant – vocals, harmonica (1968–1980, 1985, 1988, 1995, 2007)
- Jimmy Page – guitars (1968–1980, 1985, 1988, 1995, 2007)
- John Paul Jones – bass, keyboards (1968–1980, 1985, 1988, 1995, 2007)
- John Bonham – drums, percussion (1968–1980; died 1980)

Guest musicians post-breakup

- Tony Thompson – drums (1985; died 2003)
- Phil Collins – drums (1985)
- Paul Martinez – bass (1985; died 2024)
- Jason Bonham – drums, percussion, backing vocals (1988, 1995, 2007)
- Michael Lee – drums (1995; died 2008)

== Discography ==
- Led Zeppelin (1969)
- Led Zeppelin II (1969)
- Led Zeppelin III (1970)
- Untitled album (1971) (commonly known as Led Zeppelin IV)
- Houses of the Holy (1973)
- Physical Graffiti (1975)
- Presence (1976)
- In Through the Out Door (1979)
- Coda (1982)

== See also ==
- List of British Grammy winners and nominees
- List of cover versions of Led Zeppelin songs
- List of Led Zeppelin songs written or inspired by others
