= The Yardbirds discography =

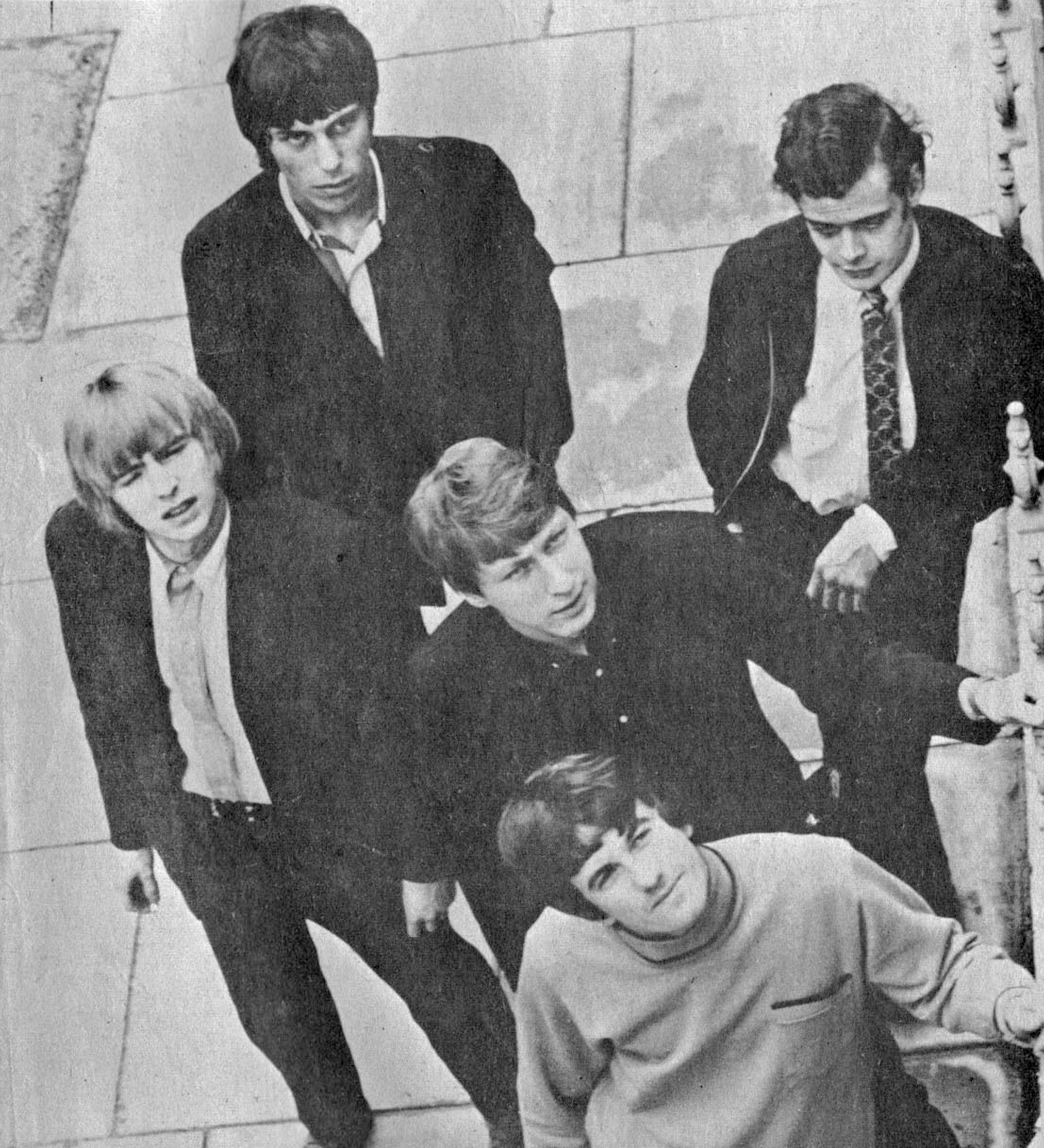
- The Yardbirds in 1965 (left to right): Keith Relf, Jeff Beck, Chris Dreja, Jim McCarty, Paul Samwell-Smith
- Studio albums: 6
- Extended plays: 2
- Live albums: 12
- Compilation albums: 10+
- Singles: 16
- Music videos: 3

The Yardbirds were an English rock group that had a string of Top 40 radio hits in mid-1960s in the UK and the US and introduced guitarists Eric Clapton, Jeff Beck, and Jimmy Page. Their first album released in the UK, Five Live Yardbirds (1964), represented their early club performances with Clapton. The Yardbirds' first American album, For Your Love (1965), was released to capitalise on their first hit, and to promote the group's first US tour. However, Clapton had already decided to pursue a different musical direction and was replaced by Beck. Several popular singles with Beck followed, including a second American album, Having a Rave Up with the Yardbirds (1965), that, as with their previous album, was a split release featuring songs with both Clapton and Beck.

In 1966, the Yardbirds recorded their first studio album of all original material. Released in the UK as Yardbirds and in the US as Over Under Sideways Down, the album acquired the nickname "Roger the Engineer" after a caption on the English cover drawn by rhythm guitarist Chris Dreja. Shortly after its release, bassist Paul Samwell-Smith left the group and was replaced by Page. Page soon switched to second lead guitar, with Dreja taking over on bass. This lineup only produced two songs – the psychedelic "Happenings Ten Years Time Ago" (1966), which was the group's last song to reach the charts in the UK, and "Stroll On", the proto-heavy metal remake of "Train Kept A-Rollin'" they performed for the film Blowup (1966).

The dual lead lineup with Beck and Page did not last long; Beck had become increasingly unhappy with the constant touring and left the group, with Page remaining as the sole guitarist. The period as a quartet with Page was the Yardbirds' most stable and lasted nearly two and a half years. In the US, they continued to release singles and an album, Little Games (1967). The records, overseen by pop producer Mickie Most, were mostly out-of-step with the audience's shift to an album-oriented, more diverse sound. However, the Yardbirds' frequent concert appearances at counter-culture venues were well received. They were able to perform more experimental fare, such as "Dazed and Confused", the Page solo acoustic guitar piece "White Summer", and expanded, reworked versions and medleys of some of their earlier songs, as documented on the Page-produced Yardbirds '68 (2017). After a last American tour, the group disbanded in the summer of 1968.

Since their breakup, a number of new albums have appeared. Besides numerous anthologies, albums featuring additional live recordings and various demos and outtakes from 1963 to 1968 have been released. Although some have received favourable reviews, music critic Richie Unterberger has noted the great number of substandard releases throughout the world. In 1994, original drummer Jim McCarty and rhythm guitarist Chris Dreja began performing and recording as the Yardbirds. Recordings with various singers and guitarists have been released.

== Original 1964–1968 releases ==
The Yardbirds were signed to EMI and their records were released through the Columbia Graphophone Company in the UK and Epic Records in the US. In other countries, the group's releases were handled by a variety of labels, including affiliates of Columbia and Epic, Capitol (Canada), Riviera (France), Ricordi International (Italy), Odeon (Japan), and CBS (international). Sometimes, Yardbirds' records appeared on several labels in the same territory (in Germany, there were releases by Columbia, Epic, and CBS) and were reconfigured from the original UK and US records.

=== Albums ===
In their native UK, Columbia issued only two albums during the Yardbirds' career, Five Live Yardbirds (1964) and Yardbirds, popularly referred to as "Roger the Engineer" (1966). For Epic in the US, Yardbirds' manager Giorgio Gomelsky produced two albums, For Your Love (1965) and Having a Rave Up with the Yardbirds (1965), which were collections of new material mixed in with singles and live recordings featuring both Clapton and Beck. Epic subsequently issued Over Under Sideways Down (the US reconfiguration of Yardbirds, 1966), The Yardbirds' Greatest Hits (1967), and the Mickie Most-produced Little Games (1967). Reconfigurations of the Epic For Your Love were released in Canada (Capitol's Heart Full of Soul) and other countries. All albums were released on 12-inch 33⅓ rpm LP records. Where two catalogue numbers are given, the album was released in monaural and stereo versions; otherwise it is mono only.

List of original albums
| Title | Album details | Main charts (peaks) | | | Ref(s) |
| Title | Album details | UK | US | Other | Ref(s) |
|---|---|---|---|---|---|
| Five Live Yardbirds | Type: Live; Released: 4 December 1964 (UK); Label: Columbia (33SX 1662); Notes: Recorded 20 March 1964, Marquee Club, London | — | — | — | |
| For Your Love | Type: Studio; Released: 5 July 1965 (US); Label: Epic (LN 24167/BN-26167) | — | 96 | (Note: For Your Love (album) reached No. 20 in Germany.) | |
| Heart Full of Soul | Type: Studio; Released: 6 September 1965 (Canada); Label: Capitol (T-6139) | — | — | — | |
| Having a Rave Up with the Yardbirds | Type: Studio, live; Released: 30 November 1965 (US); Label: Epic (LN 24177/BN 26177); Notes: Includes four tracks from the UK Five Live Yardbirds | — | 53 | — | |
| Yardbirds a.k.a. Roger the Engineer | Type: Studio; Released: 15 July 1966 (UK); Label: Columbia (SX 6063/SCX 6063) | 20 | — | — | |
| Over Under Sideways Down | Type: Studio; Released: 8 August 1966 (US); Label: Epic (LN 24210/BN 26210); Notes: Same as Yardbirds but without two tracks and different cover art | — | 52 | — | |
| The Yardbirds Greatest Hits | Type: Compilation; Released: 17 April 1967 (US); Label: Epic (LN 24246/BN 26246) | — | 28 | (Note: Although a chart published on 27 May 1967 by the Canadian music magazine RPM shows that The Yardbirds' Greatest Hits on Capitol reached No. 20, there is no other indication that such an album was actually released. Later in October, Capitol released a compilation, titled The Hits of the Yardbirds, but it did not reach the RPM chart.) | |
| Little Games | Type: Studio; Released: 24 July 1967 (US); Label: Epic (LN 24313/BN 26313) | — | 80 | — | |
"—" denotes a recording that did not chart or was not released in that territory.

=== Other album appearances ===
In an early bid to promote the group, manager Gomelsky arranged for the Yardbirds to serve as backing musicians for a British tour by American bluesman Sonny Boy Williamson II. Recordings during the 1963–1964 tour were later released in 1966, after the Yardbirds had a string of Top 40 hits. In 1966, after Page joined the group, the Yardbirds contributed a remake of "Train Kept A-Rollin'", titled "Stroll On", for the Michelangelo Antonioni film Blow-up (1966). In 1967, MGM Records issued the soundtrack album.

List of other album appearances
| Title | Album details | Notes | Ref(s) |
|---|---|---|---|
| Sonny Boy Williamson and the Yardbirds | Type: Live; Released: 7 January 1966 (UK); 7 February 1966 (US); Label: Fontana UK (TL 5277); Mercury US (MG 21071/SR 61071) | Recorded 8 December 1963, Crawdaddy Club, Richmond as backing musicians (all songwriting, vocals, and harmonica by Williamson) | |
| Blow-Up – The Original Sound Track Album | Type: Soundtrack; Released: 20 February 1967 (US); 10 May 1967 (UK); Label: MGM US (E/SE-4447 ST); MGM UK (C/CS 8039); Charts: No. 92 on US Billboard 200 | "Stroll On" is the only Yardbirds contribution to the soundtrack; film score is by Herbie Hancock | |

=== Singles ===
In the UK, singles were the only source of many of the Yardbirds' songs, until the first anthology albums were released in the 1970s. In the US, these were usually included on albums. (Note: "Shapes of Things" and "Happening Ten Years Time Ago" were first included on The Yardbirds Greatest Hits (1967).) Two singles released in Germany and Italy in 1966 remained unavailable on album until the 1980–1990s compilations by Charly Records. The last three Epic singles (unreleased in the UK) did not appear on an album until the 1991 expanded Little Games Sessions and More album. (Note: In 1975, the last Epic singles were included on the bootleg Golden Eggs album.) All singles and extended play (EPs) were released on 7-inch 45 rpm records.

List of original singles and EPs
| Title (A-side / B-side) | Single details | Main charts (peaks) | | | Album |
| Title (A-side / B-side) | Single details | UK | US | Other | Album |
|---|---|---|---|---|---|
| "I Wish You Would" / "A Certain Girl" | Released: 1 May 1964 (UK); 17 August 1964 (US); Label: Columbia UK (DB 7283); Epic US (5-9709) | — | — | (Note: "I Wish You Would" reached No. 26 on the NME chart in the UK, but did not appear on the main Record Retailer chart.) | Non-album release (UK) For Your Love (US) |
| "Good Morning Little Schoolgirl" / "I Ain't Got You" | Released: 30 October 1964 (UK); Label: Columbia (DB 7391) | 44 | — | — | Non-album release (UK) For Your Love (US) |
| "For Your Love" / "Got to Hurry" | Released: 5 March 1965 (UK); 12 April 1965 (US); Label: Columbia UK (DB 7499); Epic US (5-9790) | 3 | 6 | (Note: "For Your Love" reached No. 1 in Canada; No. 21 in Germany; and No. 10 in Ireland.) | Non-album release (UK) Included on For Your Love in US |
| "Heart Full of Soul" / "Steeled Blues" | Released: 4 June 1965 (UK); 19 July 1965 (US); Label: Columbia UK (DB 7594); Epic US (5-9823) | 2 | 9 | (Note: "Heartful of Soul" reached No. 2 in Canada; No. 22 in Germany; No. 3 in Ireland; and No. 10 in Norway.) | Non-album release (UK) Having a Rave Up with the Yardbirds (US) |
| Five Yardbirds (EP) | Released: 11 August 1965 (UK); Label: Columbia (SEG 8421); Tracks: "My Girl Sloopy", "I'm Not Talking", "I Ain't Done Wrong" (all first released on For Your Love) | 5 | — | — | |
| "Evil Hearted You" / "Still I'm Sad" | Released: 1 October 1965 (UK); Label: Columbia (DB 7706); Notes: Double A-side (both songs charted) | 3 | — | (Note: "Evil Hearted You" reached No. 33 in Germany; and No. 6 in Ireland.) | Non-album release (UK) Having a Rave Up with the Yardbirds (US) |
| "I'm a Man" / "Still I'm Sad" | Released: 11 October 1965 (US); Label: Epic (5-9857) | — | 17 | (Note: "I'm a Man" reached No. 4 in Canada.) | Non-album release (UK) Having a Rave Up with the Yardbirds (US) |
| "Paff...Bum" / "Questa Volta" | Released: 4 February 1966 (Italy); Label: Ricordi International (SIR 20-010); Notes: Italian-language single recorded for the 1966 San Remo Song Contest | — | — | (Note: "Paff...Bum" reached No. 5 in Italy.) | Non-album release |
| "Shapes of Things" / "You're a Better Man Than I" | Released: 25 February 1966 (UK); Label: Columbia (DB 7848) | 3 | — | (Note: "Shapes of Things" (backed with "Paff...Bum") reached No. 22 in Germany.) | Non-album release B-side appeared on Having a Rave Up with the Yardbirds (US) |
| "Shapes of Things" / "New York City Blues" | Released: 28 February 1966 (US); Label: Epic (5-10006); Notes: B-side initially "I'm Not Talking", changed 28 March to "New York City Blues" | — | 11 | (Note: "Shapes of Things" (backed with "I'm Not Talking") reached No. 7 (3 weeks) in Canada.) | Non-album release |
| "Boom Boom" / "Honey In Your Hips" | Recorded: 10 December 1963 (demo); Released: 11 March 1966 (Germany); Label: CBS (1433) | — | — | — | Non-album release |
| "Over Under Sideways Down" / "Jeff's Boogie" | Released: 27 May 1966 (UK); 13 June 1966 (US); Label: Columbia UK (DB 7928); Epic US (5-10035) | 10 | 13 | (Note: "Over Under Sideways Down" reached No. 5 in Canada; and No. 35 in Germany.) | Yardbirds (UK) Over Under Sideways Down (US) |
| "Happenings Ten Years Time Ago" / "Psycho Daisies" | Released: 7 October 1966 (UK); Label: Columbia (DB 8024) | 43 | — | (Note: "Happenings Ten Years Time Ago" reached No. 31 in Canada.) | Non-album release |
| "Happenings Ten Years Time Ago" / "The Nazz Are Blue" | Released: 7 November 1966 (US); Label: Epic (5-10094) | — | 30 | — | Non-album release B-side appeared on Yardbirds (UK) |
| Over Under Sideways Down (EP) | Released: 27 January 1967 (UK); Label: Columbia (SEG 8521); Tracks: "Over Under Sideways Down", "I Can't Make Your Way", "He's Always There", "What Do You Want" | — | — | — | |
| "Little Games" / "Puzzles" | Released: 3 April 1967 (US); 21 April 1967 (UK); Label: Epic US (5-10156); Columbia UK (DB 8165) | — | 51 | (Note: "Little Games" reached No. 27 in Australia; No. 36 in Canada; and was listed second on the UK Record Mirror "Bubbling Under" expanded chart.) | Non-album release (UK) A-side appeared on Little Games (US) |
| "Ha Ha Said the Clown" / "Tinker Tailor Soldier Sailor" | Released: 17 July 1967 (US); Label: Epic (5-10204) | — | 45 | (Note: "Ha Ha Said the Clown" reached No. 38 in Canada.) | Non-album release B-side appeared on Little Games (US) |
| "Ten Little Indians" / "Drinking Muddy Water" | Released: 16 October 1967 (US); Label: Epic (5-10248) | — | 96 | (Note: "Ten Little Indians" reached No. 50 in Canada.) | Non-album release B-side appeared on Little Games (US) |
| "Goodnight Sweet Josephine" / "Think About It" | Released: 1 April 1968 (US); Label: Epic (5-10303) | — | 127 | — | Non-album release |
"—" denotes a recording that did not chart or was not released in that territory.

== Releases after 1969 ==
A large number of Yardbirds anthologies of recordings originally produced by their first manager Gomelsky have been issued by numerous record companies over the years. These do not include songs recorded with other producers after March 1966, such as "Over Under Sideways Down", "Happenings Ten Years Time Ago", and "Little Games". Often, the albums are a haphazard mix of studio and live recordings from the Clapton and early Beck eras. Music critic Richie Unterberger wrote:

Their [Yardbirds' song] catalog, however, has been subject to more exploitation than any other group of the '60s; dozens, if not hundreds, of cheesy packages of early material are generated throughout the world on a seemingly monthly basis.

However, a few early Epic anthologies and the Rhino Records set Ultimate! (2001) managed to cross license material from the different producers. Many albums of live recordings focusing on performances with Clapton or Beck have appeared and, in 2017, the Page-produced Yardbirds '68 was released. One studio album and several live albums recorded by the post-1999 reconstituted Yardbirds have been issued.

List of selected albums since 1969
| Title | Album details | Notes | Ref(s) |
|---|---|---|---|
| The Yardbirds Featuring Performances by Jeff Beck, Eric Clapton, Jimmy Page | Type: Compilation; Released: 31 August 1970 (US); Format: 2-LP record; Label: Epic (EG-30135); Charts: (Note: The Yardbirds Featuring reached No. 88 on US Cash Box Top 100 Albums.) | 20 tracks from 1964 to 1967 not already included on The Yardbirds Greatest Hits (1967) | |
| Live Yardbirds! Featuring Jimmy Page | Type: Live; Released: 13 September 1971 (US); Format: LP; Label: Epic (E 30615) | Recorded 1968 in New York City; withdrawn shortly after release, but frequently bootlegged; superseded by Yardbirds '68 (2017) | |
| Remember...The Yardbirds | Type: Compilation; Released: 18 June 1971 (UK); Format: LP; Label: Regal Starline (SRS 5069) | 12 tracks, limited to pre-Roger the Engineer recordings | |
| Shapes of Things | Type: Compilation; Released: 9 December 1977 (UK); 1978 (Canada); Format: 2-LP; Label: Charly UK (CDZ 1); Bomb Canada (104.5); Charts: (Note: Shapes of Things (album) reached No. 96 in Canada.) | 24 tracks, pre-Roger the Engineer recordings | |
| London 1963 – The First Recordings! | Type: Live; Released: 17 July 1981 (Germany); Format: LP, audio cassette; Label: L & R (44.001) | Recorded 8 December 1963, Crawdaddy Club, Richmond, UK; 10 December 1963, R.G. Jones Studio, Morden, UK (demo) | |
| Yardbirds ...On Air | Type: Live; Released: 7 May 1991 (UK); Format: Compact audio disc (CD); Label: Band of Joy (BOJCD 200) | Recorded 1965–1968 at BBC studios; re-released as BBC Sessions (1999) | |
| Little Games Sessions and More | Type: Compilation; Released: 8 April 1991 (US); Format: 2-CD; Label: EMI USA (0777-7-98213-2 7) | Both stereo and mono versions of original album tracks, plus non-album singles and alternate takes/mixes | |
| Train Kept A-Rollin' – The Complete Giorgio Gomelsky Productions | Type: Anthology; Released: 11 May 1993; Format: 4-CD boxed set; Label: Charly (CD LIK BOX 3) (UK) | Most available pre-Roger the Engineer recordings, including previously unreleased 1963–1964 demos and live recordings, and later alternate takes; re-released as The Yardbirds Story (2002) | |
| Reunion Jam | Type: Live; Released: 1 December 1999; Format: CD; Label: Mooreland St. (70729-2) | Recorded 1992 in London | |
| Cumular Limit | Type: Compilation; Released: 25 August 2000; Format: 2-CD; Label: Burning Airlines (Pilot 24) | Includes demos recorded in New York in 1968 and enhanced CD of four live songs from 1967 German TV show | |
| Ultimate! | Type: Compilation; Released: 31 July 2001; Format: 2-CD; Label: Rhino (R2 79825) | 52 tracks from 1963 demos to 1968 last single | |
| Birdland | Type: Studio; Released: 21 April 2003; Format: CD, LP; Label: Favored Nations (FN2280-2); Charts: (Note: Birdland reached No. 25 on US Billboard's Independent Albums chart and No. 67 in Germany.) | First studio album in Dreja-McCarty era, recorded 2003 in Los Angeles and London with several guests | |
| Live! Blueswailing July '64 | Type: Live; Released: 23 September 2003; Format: CD; Label: Castle Music (06076-81331-2) | Recorded in July 1964 at an unknown venue (Note: In his biography Yardbirds: The Ultimate Rave-Up, group chronicler Greg Russo claims Live! Blueswailing July '64 was actually recorded 7 August 1964 at the Marquee Club in London.) | |
| Live at B.B. King Blues Club | Type: Live; Released: 30 March 2007; Format: CD; Label: Favored Nations (FN2580-2) | Recorded in 2006 in New York City | |
| Reunion Jam Vol. II | Type: Live; Released: 25 June 2007; Format: CD; Label: Voiceprint (VP419CD) | Recorded 1992 in London | |
| Glimpses 1963–1968 | Type: Compilation; Released: 5 December 2011; Format: 5-CD boxed set; Label: Easy Action (EARS 035) | Mostly live recordings, including some unreleased and those previously scattered among various semi-official and bootleg releases | |
| Making Tracks | Type: Live; Released: 7 October 2013; Format: CD; Label: Wienerworld (WNRCD5069) | Recorded during 2010–2011 US tours | |
| Yardbirds '68 | Type: Compilation; Released: November 2017; Format: 2-CD, 2-LP; Label: JimmyPage.com | Recorded March and April 1968 in New York City | |

== Videos ==
List of videos
| Title | Details | Notes | Ref(s) |
|---|---|---|---|
| Blow-Up | Type: Feature film; Released: 1966; Label: MGM Pictures | The group performs "Stroll On"; reissued on DVD by Warner Home Video in 2004 | |
| Yardbirds: Where the Guitar Gods Played | Type: Documentary film; Released: 26 November 1991; Label: A*Vision | Performances and interviews; reissued on DVD by Rhino in 2003 | |
| Making Tracks | Type: Concert film; Released: 11 December 2012; Label: MVD Visual | Filmed during 2010–2011 US tours; released on audio CD in 2014 | |

== Notes ==
Footnotes

Citations

References

- Clapton, Eric (2007). Clapton: The Autobiography. New York City: Broadway Books. ISBN 978-0-7679-2536-5.
- Clayson, Alan (2002). The Yardbirds. San Francisco: Backbeat Books. ISBN 0-87930-724-2.
- Gomelsky, Giorgio; Cohen, Phil (2002). The Yardbirds Story (Boxed set booklet). The Yardbirds. United Kingdom: Charly Records. OCLC 62367983. SNAD 905 CD.
- Russo, Gregg (1992). Little Games Sessions and More (CD booklet). The Yardbirds. EMI North America. E2–98214.
- Russo, Gregg; Hinman, Doug; Peterson, Gary (2001). Ultimate! (Boxed set booklet). The Yardbirds. Los Angeles: Rhino Records. OCLC 781357622. R2 79825.
- Russo, Greg; Paytress, Mark (2011). Glimpses 1963–1968 (Boxed set booklet). The Yardbirds. Easy Action. EARS 035.
- Russo, Greg (2016). Yardbirds: The Ultimate Rave-Up. Floral Park, New York: Crossfire Publications. ISBN 978-0-9791845-7-4.
- Whitburn, Joel (2008). Joel Whitburn Presents Across the Charts: The 1960s. Menomonee Falls, Wisconsin: Record Research. ISBN 978-0898201758.
