= Ultimate! =

2001 compilation album of 1963–1968 songs by the Yardbirds

Compilation album by the Yardbirds
- Released: July 2001
- Recorded: December 1963 – March 1968
- Genre: Rock
- Length: 150:16
- Label: Rhino
- Producers: Gary Stewart, Bill Inglot

The Yardbirds chronology
Cumular Limit (2000)	Ultimate! (2001)	Birdland (2003)

Ultimate! is a compilation album by English rock group the Yardbirds. The 52-song two–compact disc compilation was released in 2001 by Rhino Records. The tracks span the period from the group's first demo recordings in 1963 to the last singles in 1968. They include all 17 of the group's singles, both A-side and B-sides, supplemented with more than a dozen album tracks, their performance for the film Blow-Up, and three early solo numbers by singer Keith Relf.

The Yardbirds were one of the best-known British rhythm and blues groups of the mid-1960s and part of the British Invasion phenomenon in the United States. They enjoyed a string of Top 40 hits, including "For Your Love", "Shapes of Things", and "Over Under Sideways Down". Although one album appeared on the UK Albums Chart, they had greater success in the US, with six albums on the Billboard 200 album charts between 1965 and 1967. (Note: Besides the five albums released by Epic, the Blow-Up soundtrack album appeared on Billboard's album chart.)

A large number of compilation albums have been released over the years, usually limited to the group's pre-1966 catalogue. Attempts at full career retrospectives were hampered by cross-licensing problems. Yardbirds' recordings from different periods have different owners (corresponding to the tenures of their three main producers), which proved to be an obstacle. Ultimate! is the first official compilation to feature songs from all four recording lineups of the Yardbirds – including those with guitarists Eric Clapton, Jeff Beck, Jimmy Page, and the dual lead lineup with Beck and Page. The album was released to favourable reviews, with the critics describing it as the most comprehensive, but perhaps overinclusive, collection of the group's material.

== Background ==
Prior to Ultimate!, several Yardbirds compilation albums were issued. In March 1967, Epic Records released the ten-song collection, The Yardbirds Greatest Hits. It was the group's most successful American album on the record charts and was included on Billboard magazine's 100 Top LPs of 1967 chart. Since it preceded the recording of the Little Games album with Jimmy Page, the album does not include any songs by the Page-quartet lineup. In 1970, Epic issued a second compilation album, The Yardbirds Featuring Performances by Jeff Beck, Eric Clapton, Jimmy Page. The two-LP, 22-song collection includes songs from Little Games, but lacks any of the material recorded by the dual-lead guitar lineup with Beck and Page. Starline Records in the UK, an EMI Records subsidiary, released a compilation titled Remember... The Yardbirds in 1971. It includes twelve songs with Clapton and Beck.

Their [Yardbirds' song] catalog ... has been subject to more exploitation than any other group of the '60s; dozens, if not hundreds, of cheesy packages of early material are generated throughout the world on a seemingly monthly basis.

— Richie Unterberger, AllMusic

Beyond these early attempts by their official record companies, numerous small and gray market labels have issued a large number of "best of" and "greatest hits" packages. In Europe and the UK, the group's material was licensed to several different record companies, who issued collections of seemingly random tracks, often with attractive packaging and Clapton's or Beck's names and images prominently displayed. In 1977, Shapes of Things, the first of many albums made up of Giorgio Gomelsky-era Yardbirds tracks (limited to Clapton and pre-Roger the Engineer Beck recordings), was released by Charly Records.

With the advent of audio compact discs, this trend accelerated. When the Yardbirds' were inducted into the Rock and Roll Hall of Fame in 1992, Sony Music Entertainment, parent of Epic, prepared two compilations. Both sets contained two CDs worth of haphazardly-sequenced songs (with overlap) from the Gomelsky era. However, the early Epic compilations continued to be the only ones to include songs from Roger the Engineer and Little Games, which were not owned by Gomelsky.

== Song selection ==
The songs selected for Ultimate! represent all singles and a significant portion of the material found on the Yardbirds' albums released between 1964 and 1968 by Columbia Records in the UK and Epic Records in the US. Yardbirds' biographer Adam Clayson describes the selections as "the best of the Yardbirds, with material from all four line-ups [sic]: Clapton; Beck; Beck & Page; and Page." Critic Richie Unterberger noted that the set "manages to cross-license material from the Clapton, Beck, and Page eras". The songs are taken from the core of the group's catalogue:

- Five Live Yardbirds: four out of ten tracks
- For Your Love: eight of eleven
- Having a Rave Up with the Yardbirds: eight of ten
- Yardbirds a.k.a. Over Under Sideways Down/Roger the Engineer: ten of twelve
- The Yardbirds Greatest Hits: all
- Little Games: six of ten

The balance are non-album singles, "Stroll On" from Blow-Up, and three solo recordings by Keith Relf. (Note: Many of the non-album singles and "Stroll On" were included on the 1975 bootlegs Golden Eggs and More Golden Eggs.) Since Ultimate focuses on officially released recordings from 1964 to 1968, it does not include material released later or by other labels, such as live recordings (except from Five Live Yardbirds), demos, and alternate takes. (Note: Live recordings, such as those found on Sonny Boy Williamson and The Yardbirds, Live Yardbirds: Featuring Jimmy Page, Yardbirds ... On Air (re-released as BBC Sessions), Live! Blueswailing July '64, and Glimpses 1963–1968 are not represented. Likewise, demos and alternate takes/mixes included on Train Kept A-Rollin': The Complete Giorgio Gomelsky Productions (re-released as The Yardbirds Story), Little Games Sessions and More and Cumular Limit are not included.)

== Release and critical reception ==
Professional ratings
Review scores
Source	Rating
AllMusic	5/5 stars
The Austin Chronicle	3/5 stars
Vintage Guitar	Recommended

In 2001, Rhino Records issued Ultimate! in July in the US and in August in the UK as a two-CD boxed set. Dan Forte of Vintage Guitar magazine called it "the closest-to-definitive collection of a band that’s been woefully under-represented on CD". The Austin Chronicle's Raoul Hernandez described the album as "lend[ing] ample credence to the supposition that the Yardbirds are the not-so-missing musical link between Sixties pop and Seventies rock". However, he points out that the Mickie Most-produced tracks with Page "flounder", making the collection less of a concise statement. Similarly, while Richie Unterberger gave it AllMusic's five star rating, he questioned the inclusion of some of the more obscure material. He felt that the early demos, the Italian-language single, and the Keith Relf solo numbers detract from "the overall tone of a set largely selected on the basis of quality, rather than collectability". Forte notes that more songs from Five Live Yardbirds and two strong Page-era songs, "Glimpses" and "Smile on Me", were not included.

== Track listing ==
The album sequencing is arranged chronologically, beginning with demo recordings from 1963. The songwriter's names, dates recorded, and track running times are taken from the Ultimate! CD booklet and may differ from other releases. For discographical information (release dates, chart positions, catalogue numbers, etc.), see The Yardbirds discography.

Disc one
No.	Title	Writer(s)	Date(s) recorded	Length
1.	"Boom Boom"	John Lee Hooker	10 December 1963	2:26
2.	"Honey in Your Hips"	Keith Relf	10 December 1963	2:20
3.	"A Certain Girl"	Allen Toussaint	March 1964	2:19
4.	"I Wish You Would"	William Arnold	March 1964	2:20
5.	"Too Much Monkey Business"	Chuck Berry	March–April 1964	3:53
6.	"Got Love If You Want It"	James Moore	March–April 1964	2:40
7.	"Smokestack Lightning"	Chester Burnett	March–April 1964	5:42
8.	"Here 'Tis"	Ellas McDaniel	March–April 1964	5:15
9.	"Good Morning Little Schoolgirl"	Sonny Boy Williamson	August–September 1964	2:46
10.	"Got to Hurry"	Giorgio Gomelsky	6 August 1964	2:29
11.	"I Ain't Got You"	Calvin Carter	19 September 1964	2:01
12.	"For Your Love"	Graham Gouldman	1 February 1965	2:31
13.	"I'm Not Talking"	Mose Allison	13 April 1965	2:35
14.	"Steeled Blues"	Jeff Beck, Relf	15 March 1965	2:40
15.	"Heart Full of Soul"	Gouldman	20 April 1965	2:30
16.	"I Ain't Done Wrong"	Relf	15 March 1965	3:42
17.	"You're a Better Man Than I"	Michael Hugg, Brian Hugg	September 1965	3:59
18.	"Shapes of Things"	Paul Samwell-Smith, Relf, Jim McCarty	December 1965 – January 1966	2:27
19.	"The Train Kept A-Rollin'"	Tiny Bradshaw, Sydney Nathan, Howie Kay	September 1965	3:26
20.	"New York City Blues"	Relf, Chris Dreja	21–22 September 1965	4:21
21.	"Evil Hearted You"	Gouldman	23 August 1965	2:26
22.	"I'm A Man"	McDaniel	September 1965	2:39
23.	"Still I'm Sad"	Samwell-Smith, McCarty	August–September 1965	3:04
24.	"Questa Volta"	Roberto Satti, Gianni Marchetti, Giulio Rapetti	January 1966	2:35
25.	"Pafff...Bum"	Gian Franco Reverberi, Sergio Bardotti, Samwell-Smith	January 1966	2:38
Total length:				75:56

Disc two
No.	Title	Writer(s)	Date(s) recorded	Length
1.	"Lost Woman"	Dreja, McCarty, Beck, Relf, Samwell-Smith	May–June 1966	3:14
2.	"Over Under Sideways Down"	Dreja, McCarty, Beck, Relf, Samwell-Smith	April 1966	2:24
3.	"The Nazz Are Blue"	Beck	May–June 1966	3:03
4.	"I Can't Make Your Way"	Dreja, McCarty, Relf, Samwell-Smith	June 1966	2:27
5.	"Rack My Mind"	Dreja, McCarty, Beck, Relf, Samwell-Smith	May–June 1966	3:14
6.	"Hot House of Omagararshid"	Dreja, McCarty, Beck, Relf, Samwell-Smith	May–June 1966	2:44
7.	"Jeff's Boogie"	Beck	April 1966	2:25
8.	"He's Always There"	McCarty, Samwell-Smith	May–June 1966	2:29
9.	"Turn into Earth"	Samwell-Smith, Rosemary Simon	May–June 1966	3:12
10.	"What Do You Want"	Dreja, McCarty, Beck, Relf, Samwell-Smith	May–June 1966	3:22
11.	"Happenings Ten Years Time Ago"	Relf, Beck, Jimmy Page, McCarty	July, September–October 1966	2:57
12.	"Psycho Daisies"	Dreja, McCarty, Beck, Relf, Page	September–October 1966	1:50
13.	"Stroll On"	Relf, Page, Beck, Dreja, McCarty	3–5 October 1966	2:46
14.	"Little Games"	Phil Wainman, Harold Spiro	5 March 1967	2:25
15.	"Puzzles"	Dreja, Page, McCarty, Relf	5 March 1967	2:03
16.	"White Summer"	Page	28–29 April 1967	3:51
17.	"Tinker, Tailor, Soldier, Sailor"	Page, McCarty	28–29 April 1967	2:54
18.	"No Excess Baggage"	Roger Atkins, Carl D'Errico	28–29 April 1967	2:39
19.	"Drinking Muddy Water"	Dreja, Page, McCarty, Relf	28–29 April 1967	2:54
20.	"Only the Black Rose"	Relf	1 May 1967	2:52
21.	"Ten Little Indians"	Harry Nilsson	25 September 1967	2:17
22.	"Ha Ha Said the Clown"	Tony Hazzard	13–19 June 1967	2:29
23.	"Goodnight Sweet Josephine"	Hazzard	March 1968	2:46
24.	"Think About It"	Relf, McCarty, Page	January 1968	3:50
25.	"Knowing"	Relf	16 April 1966	1:55
26.	"Mr. Zero"	Bob Lind	16 April 1966	2:47
27.	"Shapes in My Mind"	Simon Napier-Bell	August–September 1966	2:19
Total length:				74:20

== Personnel ==
=== The Yardbirds ===
- Keith Relf – vocals, harmonica, tambourine, acoustic guitar
- Chris Dreja – rhythm guitar (disc one, disc two tracks 1 through 10, 25, and 26); lead guitar ("Questa Volta"); bass guitar (disc two tracks 13, 15, 17, 19, and 24); piano; maracas
- Jim McCarty – drums (disc one, disc two tracks 1 through 13, 15 through 20, 21 through 23, and 24 through 26); percussion; backing vocals
- Paul Samwell-Smith – bass guitar (disc one except track 15, disc two tracks 1, 3, 5, 7, 10, 25, and 26)
- Eric Clapton – guitar (disc one tracks 1 through 12)
- Jeff Beck – guitar (disc one tracks 13 through 25, disc two tracks 1 through 13, 25, and 26); bass guitar ("Over Under Sideways Down"); vocal ("The Nazz Are Blue" and "Psycho Daisies")
- Jimmy Page – guitar (disc two tracks 11, 13 through 24, and 27); bass guitar ("Psycho Daisies")

=== Additional musicians ===
- Brian Auger – harpsichord ("For Your Love")
- Denny Piercey – bongoes ("For Your Love")
- Ron Prentice – double bass ("For Your Love"); bass guitar ("Heart Full of Soul")
- Giorgio Gomelsky – backing vocals ("A Certain Girl" and "Still I'm Sad")
- Joe Osborn – bass guitar ("Shapes in My Mind")
- Hal Blaine – drums ("Shapes in My Mind")
- John Paul Jones – bass guitar ("Happenings Ten Years Time Ago," "Little Games", "No Excess Baggage," "Ten Little Indians," and "Goodnight Sweet Josephine"); arrangement ("Little Games" and "Ten Little Indians")
- Dougie Wright – drums ("Little Games")
- Chris Karan – tabla ("White Summer")
- Ian Stewart – piano ("Drinking Muddy Water")
- Al Gorgoni – guitar ("Ha Ha Said the Clown")
- Rick Nielsen – organ ("Ha Ha Said the Clown")
- Joe Macho – bass guitar ("Ha Ha Said the Clown")
- Bobby Gregg – drums ("Ha Ha Said the Clown")
- Nicky Hopkins – piano ("Goodnight Sweet Josephine")
- Clem Cattini – drums ("Ten Little Indians" and "Goodnight Sweet Josephine")

=== Technical personnel ===
- Gary Stewart – compilation producer
- Bill Inglot – sound producer, remastering engineer
- Dan Hersch – remastering engineer
- Sevie Bates – art director, designer

== Notes ==
=== References ===
- Clayson, Alan (2002). The Yardbirds. San Francisco: Backbeat Books. ISBN 0-87930-724-2.
- Gomelsky, Giorgio; Cohen, Phil (2002). The Yardbirds Story (Boxed set booklet). The Yardbirds. United Kingdom: Charly Records. OCLC 62367983. SNAD 905 CD.
- Koda, Cub; Russo, Gregg (2001). Ultimate! (Boxed set booklet). The Yardbirds. Los Angeles: Rhino Records. OCLC 781357622. R2 79825.
- Russo, Greg (October 2016). Yardbirds: The Ultimate Rave-Up (6th. ed.). Crossfire Publications. ISBN 978-0-9791845-7-4.
