= Yardbirds '68 =

Compilation album by the Yardbirds
- Released: November 2017
- Recorded: March–April 1968
- Venue: Anderson Theater, New York City
- Studio: Columbia Recording, New York City
- Genre: Hard rock, blues rock
- Length: 65:45
- Label: JimmyPage.com
- Producer: Jimmy Page

Yardbirds '68 is a compilation album by English rock group the Yardbirds. Recorded in 1968 in New York City when the group was a quartet with guitarist Jimmy Page, it includes live performances and demos. Page produced the album, which was released in November 2017 on his own record label. It was released as a double CD and LP record.

== Recording and release ==
The tracks were recorded during the Yardbirds' last American tour in 1968; the live recordings are from their performance at the Anderson Theater on 30 March and studio recordings are demos from sessions at Columbia Recording Studio in April. Previously, the ten live tracks appeared on Live Yardbirds: Featuring Jimmy Page. The album was issued by Epic Records in 1971, but was quickly withdrawn. Most of the eight demos were included on the limited release Cumular Limit in 2000. "Knowing That I'm Losing You" with vocals by Keith Relf, was pulled from Cumular Limit prior to release to avoid a lawsuit, and is officially released for the first time on Yardbirds '68, although as an instrumental.

The live performance follows a typical Yardbirds' set list for the period and includes several of their best-known songs, including "The Train Kept A-Rollin'", "I'm a Man", "Shapes of Things", and "Over Under Sideways Down". Ryan Reed of Rolling Stone noted that among the songs are three which carried over to Led Zeppelin: "Dazed and Confused", "White Summer", and "Knowing That I'm Losing You", which was later reworked as "Tangerine".

All three surviving members of the 1968 lineup (Jim McCarty, Chris Dreja and Jimmy Page) participated in preparing the album and issued a joint statement: "We thought this might be lost forever, but we’ve rediscovered it, re-mixed it. It’s of great historical importance. We’re delighted to see the release."

== Critical reception ==
In a review for Classic Rock magazine, Ian Fortnam gave the album four out of five stars. While he has favourable comments on some of the demos, he notes "the main attraction here is the live set" that includes Yardbirds' standards and "Dazed and Confused". He adds that the audio has a brighter, cleaner sound than the 1971 Epic album; however, the song introductions and banter (provided by singer Keith Relf) have been unfortunately removed.

For the ten year anniversary edition of the Led Zeppelin biography, When Giants Walked the Earth, author Mick Wall commented on Yardbirds '68: "It's not overstating the case to describe this [album] as proto-Led Zeppelin ... it's all right there in New York in March 1968 [with] the sonic templates of 'Train Kept A-Rollin'', 'Dazed and Confused' and 'White Summer'".

== Track listing ==
Writer credits are from the album liner notes. Running times (not included in the notes) are taken from the AllMusic album overview.

Live at Anderson Theatre (CD/LP 1)
No.	Title	Writer(s)	Length
1.	"The Train Kept A-Rollin'"	Lois Mann, Tiny Bradshaw, Howard Kay	3:05
2.	"Mr, You're a Better Man Than I"	Mike Hugg, Brian Hugg	5:05
3.	"Heart Full of Soul"	Graham Gouldman	1:48
4.	"Dazed and Confused"	Jimmy Page (inspired by Jake Holmes)	6:07
5.	"My Baby"	Jerry Ragovoy, Mort Shuman	2:50
6.	"Over Under Sideways Down"	Chris Dreja, Keith Relf, Paul Samwell-Smith, Jeff Beck, Jim McCarty	2:17
7.	"Drinking Muddy Water"	Dreja, Relf, Page, McCarty	2:56
8.	"Shapes of Things"	Relf, Samwell-Smith, McCarty	2:30
9.	"White Summer"	Page	3:48
10.	"I'm a Man" (contains "Moanin' and Sobbin'")	Ellas McDaniel a.k.a. Bo Diddley; Page, Dreja, Relf, McCarty	10:19

Studio Sketches (CD/LP 2)
No.	Title	Writer(s)	Length
1.	"Avron Knows"	Page, Relf, McCarty	3:49
2.	"Spanish Blood" (instrumental with spoken verses by McCarty)	Page, McCarty	3:15
3.	"Knowing That I'm Losing You (Tangerine)" (instrumental)	Page	2:54
4.	"Taking a Hold On Me" (vocal by McCarty)	Page, McCarty	3:02
5.	"Drinking Muddy Water" (version two)	Page, Dreja, Relf, McCarty	2:49
6.	"My Baby"	Ragovoy, Shuman	2:59
7.	"Avron’s Eyes" (instrumental)	Page	2:56
8.	"Spanish Blood" (instrumental)	Page, McCarty	3:11

== Personnel ==
- Keith Relf – vocals, harmonica, percussion
- Jimmy Page – guitars
- Chris Dreja – bass guitar, backing vocals
- Jim McCarty – drums, percussion, vocals
