= A Certain Girl =

- UK reissue single label

Single by Ernie K-Doe
- A-side: "I Cried My Last Tear"
- Released: November 1961
- Genre: R&B
- Length: 2:42
- Label: Minit
- Songwriter: Naomi Neville a.k.a. Allen Toussaint

Ernie K-Doe singles chronology
"Te-Ta-Te-Ta-Ta" (1961)	"A Certain Girl" (1961)	"Popeye Joe" (1962)

"A Certain Girl" is a rhythm and blues song written by Allen Toussaint, with the credit listed under his pen name Naomi Neville. New Orleans R&B singer Ernie K-Doe recorded it in 1961. Minit Records released the song as the B-side of "I Cried My Last Tear".

The single became a double-sided hit on Billboard magazine's Hot 100 record chart, with "A Certain Girl" reaching number 71 (and "I Cried My Last Tear" number 69) on December 4, 1961. Neither song appeared on Billboard's Hot R&B sides chart.

Over the years, K-Doe's original "A Certain Girl" has been included on several compilations and a variety of musicians have recorded versions of the song.

== The Yardbirds rendition ==
=== Background ===
"A Certain Girl" was one of the first songs recorded by English rock band the Yardbirds. At the time, the group were a part of the early British rhythm and blues scene that produced bands such as the Rolling Stones and drew their repertoire from American blues and rhythm and blues artists such as Muddy Waters, Howlin' Wolf, and Bo Diddley. They had heard K-Doe's song on a London Records compilation album featuring Minit Records R&B artists titled We Sing the Blues (1963).

=== Recording and release ===
With Eric Clapton on lead guitar, the Yardbirds first attempted a recording in January 1964 at the RG Jones Recording Studios, Surrey, England. A 12-inch acetate demo (co-produced by Mike Vernon) was pressed for an EMI audition (released on the Yardbirds anthologies Train Kept A-Rollin' – The Complete Giorgio Gomelsky Productions (1993) and Glimpses 1963–1968 (2011)).

In March 1964, a second attempt was made at Olympic Studios in London that yielded the master recording. Produced by manager Giorgio Gomelsky, the song was planned as the A-side for the Yardbirds' first single; however, their version of "I Wish You Would" (recorded during the same session) was used instead, with "A Certain Girl" becoming the B-side. The single was released by EMI subsidiary Columbia Graphophone Company in May 1964. In August, Epic Records released the single in the US, but it failed to chart (both songs were included on the Yardbirds' first Epic album For Your Love (1965)).

=== Reception ===
Although "A Certain Girl" is a brief 2:15, Clapton manages a nearly half-minute guitar solo that Gomelsky describes as a "fat and fuzzy guitar riff". Yardbirds biographer Alan Clayson compared it to "high-velocity flash ... his break has almost a separate life from the rest of the number." Yardbirds drummer Jim McCarty felt that the song was "too clean, too sparkling and it even had a hint of 'novelty song'" perhaps due to Gomelsky's production and the repeated "yeah" interjections. In his autobiography, Clapton described the early recordings as sounding "pretty lame. We just sounded young and white ... I felt just that we were falling short of the mark in some way." However, music journalist Cub Koda was more indulging: "If you can get past the Andy Hardy backups, you have a pretty catchy ditty [that] must have caught the ears of Warren Zevon". Future Yardbird Jimmy Page provided the lead guitar for a 1964 version by English group the First Gear (included on Jimmy Page: Session Man, Vol. 1 (1989)).

== Versions by other artists ==
Warren Zevon released a cover of "A Certain Girl" in 1980, with Jackson Browne on backing vocals. Released as a single from his album, Bad Luck Streak in Dancing School, it reached number 57 on the Hot 100 and number 57 on the Cash Box Top 100. In Canada, it reached number 61. Record World called it a "a hot rocker" and said that "Waddy Wachtel provides the guitar sparks and the Jackson Browne/Rick Marotta chorus is cute & catchy."

The 2002 re-release of Better Late Than Never, the 1996 debut album by The Slackers, features a cover of the song as a previously unreleased bonus track.

The song's writer Allen Toussaint performed the song as a part of a medley of some of his hits in the 2005 documentary film Make It Funky!. It presents a history of New Orleans music and its influence on rhythm and blues, rock and roll, funk and jazz.

== Sources ==
- Clapton, Eric (2007). Clapton: The Autobiography. New York City: Broadway Books. ISBN 978-0-7679-2536-5.
- Clayson, Alan (2002). The Yardbirds. San Francisco: Backbeat Books. ISBN 0-87930-724-2.
- Gomelsky, Giorgio; Cohen, Phil (2002). The Yardbirds Story (Boxed set booklet). The Yardbirds. United Kingdom: Charly Records. OCLC 62367983. SNAD 905 CD.
- Koda, Cub (2001). Ultimate! (Boxed set booklet). The Yardbirds. Los Angeles: Rhino Records. OCLC 781357622. R2 79825.
- McCarty, Jim (2018). Nobody Told Me: My Life with the Yardbirds, Renaissance and Other Stories. ISBN 978-0244966508.
- Russo, Greg (2016). Yardbirds: The Ultimate Rave-Up. Floral Park, New York: Crossfire Publications. ISBN 978-0-9791845-7-4.
