= Shapes of Things (album) =

Compilation album by the Yardbirds
- Released: 9 December 1977
- Recorded: March 1964 – January 1966
- Genre: Rock
- Length: 57:43
- Label: Charly
- Producer: Giorgio Gomelsky

The Yardbirds chronology
Live Yardbirds: Featuring Jimmy Page (1971)	Shapes of Things (1977)	London 1963 – The First Recordings! (1984)

Shapes of Things is a double LP compilation album of songs by English rock group the Yardbirds. It was released by Charly Records on 9 December 1977, the first of many Yardbirds compilations on the label. It features selections produced by Giorgio Gomelsky that were recorded between 1964 and 1966.

The album marks the first UK release of the group's influential "The Train Kept A-Rollin'" and the first album appearance of the instrumental "Steeled Blues". Demos for four songs later recorded for the group's post-Gomelsky album, Yardbirds (also known as Over Under Sideways Down and Roger the Engineer), are also included.

In Canada, Shapes of Things was released by Bomb Records with a different cover which used a group photo from the band's Jeff Beck era. It reached number 96 on the RPM Top 100 album chart in 1978. Charly Records also used the same title for a comprehensive seven-LP collection of Gomelsky-produced material released in 1984.

== Track listing ==
Side one
No.	Title	Writer(s)	Original release	Length
1.	"Too Much Monkey Business"	Chuck Berry	Five Live Yardbirds	2:51
2.	"I Wish You Would"	Billy Boy Arnold	UK/US single	2:18
3.	"Good Morning Little Schoolgirl"	Don Level, Bob Love	UK single	2:48
4.	"For Your Love"	Graham Gouldman	UK/US single	2:27
5.	"A Certain Girl"	Naomi Neville a.k.a. Allen Toussaint	B-side "I Wish You Would"	2:18
6.	"Got to Hurry"	Oscar Rasputin a.k.a. Giorgio Gomelsky	B-side "For Your Love"	2:34

Side two
No.	Title	Writer(s)	Original Release	Length
1.	"Smokestack Lightning"	Chester Burnett a.k.a. Howlin' Wolf	Five Live Yardbirds	5:30
2.	"Evil Hearted You"	Gouldman	UK single	2:26
3.	"Still I'm Sad"	Paul Samwell-Smith, Jim McCarty	B-side "Evil Hearted You"	3:00
4.	"Steeled Blues"	Jeff Beck, Keith Relf	B-side "Heart Full of Soul"	2:37
5.	"Train Kept A Rolling"	Tiny Bradshaw, Lois Mann a.k.a. Syd Nathan, Howie Kay	Having a Rave Up	3:25
6.	"Here 'Tis"	Ellas McDaniel a.k.a. Bo Diddley	Five Live Yardbirds	5:20

Side three
No.	Title	Writer(s)	Original Release	Length
1.	"What Do You Want"	Chris Dreja, Beck, McCarty, Relf, Samwell-Smith	demo	3:10
2.	"New York City Blues"	Relf	B-side "Shapes of Things" (US)	4:17
3.	"For R.S.G."	Beck, Relf, Samwell-Smith	demo	4:04
4.	"You're a Better Man Than I"	Mike Hugg, Brian Hugg	Having a Rave Up	3:17
5.	"Jeff's Blues"	Beck	demo	3:03
6.	"I Ain't Got You"	Calvin Carter	B-side "Good Morning Little School Girl"	1:59

Side four
No.	Title	Writer(s)	Original Release	Length
1.	"I Ain't Done Wrong"	Relf	For Your Love	3:39
2.	"Someone to Love Part One"	Dreja, Beck, McCarty, Relf, Samwell-Smith	demo	2:23
3.	"Someone to Love Part Two"	Dreja, Beck, McCarty, Relf, Samwell-Smith	demo	4:17
4.	"My Gal Sloopy"	Wes Farrell, Bert Russell	For Your Love	5:34
5.	"Shapes of Things"	McCarty, Relf, Samwell-Smith	UK/US single	2:24

== Personnel ==
=== The Yardbirds ===
- Keith Relf – vocals, harmonica, acoustic guitar, percussion
- Eric Clapton – lead guitar (Side 1; Side 2; tracks 1 and 5; Side 3, track 6)
- Jeff Beck – lead guitar (Side 2, tracks 2-5; Side 3, tracks 1-5; Side 4)
- Chris Dreja – rhythm guitar
- Paul Samwell-Smith – bass guitar, backing vocals
- Jim McCarty – drums, backing vocals
- Giorgio Gomelsky – producer, backing vocals on "A Certain Girl" and "Still I'm Sad"
