= Heart Full of Soul =

1965 song by the Yardbirds

Single by the Yardbirds
- B-side: "Steeled Blues"
- Released: 4 June 1965 (UK); 2 July 1965 (US)
- Recorded: 20 April 1965
- Studio: Advision, London
- Genre: Raga rock, psychedelic rock
- Length: 2:28
- Label: Columbia (UK); Epic (US)
- Songwriter: Graham Gouldman
- Producer: Giorgio Gomelsky

The Yardbirds UK singles chronology
"For Your Love" (1965)	"Heart Full of Soul" (1965)	"Evil Hearted You" / "Still I'm Sad" (1965)

The Yardbirds US singles chronology
"For Your Love" (1965)	"Heart Full of Soul" (1965)	"I'm a Man" (1965)

"Heart Full of Soul" is a single by the English rock band the Yardbirds released in June 1965. Written by Graham Gouldman, it was the Yardbirds' first single after Jeff Beck replaced Eric Clapton as lead guitarist. Released only three months after "For Your Love", "Heart Full of Soul" reached the Top 10 on the singles charts in the UK, US, and several other countries.

The Yardbirds first recorded the song with an Indian sitar player performing the distinctive instrumental figures. However, the group were dissatisfied with the results, so Beck developed the part on electric guitar to emulate the sitar. A contemporary review described it as an "oriental touch", and music writers have identified Beck's contribution as introducing Indian-influenced guitar stylings to rock music, and as one of the earliest examples of what became known as raga rock. Beck's use of a fuzz box has also been cited as perhaps the first significant use of the effect.

As one of the Yardbirds' most popular songs, it was frequently performed in concert. There are a number of live recordings, the earliest of which feature Beck, while later ones feature guitarist Jimmy Page. "Heart Full of Soul" appears on several of the group's compilations and renditions have been recorded by other musicians.

== Background ==
Guitarist Eric Clapton left the Yardbirds in March 1965 because of a perceived shift in musical direction. Inspired in part by the addition of guitarist Jeff Beck, who replaced Clapton, the group began to experiment with different musical styles. Beck had more varied influences and used electronically enhanced guitar effects, which he brought to the group's sound. The use of a fuzz box was new at the time, as was incorporating feedback into musical passages. When preparing for a follow-up single to their first record chart hit, "For Your Love", the song's writer Graham Gouldman provided a demo for a new song. Music critic Richie Unterberger described Gouldman as "a genius at effectively alternating tempos and major/minor modes", as used in "Heart Full of Soul". The shift in tempo and use of double-time was also a feature of the Yardbirds' live performances, known as a "rave up".

At the time, popular music at large was seen as becoming more experimental. Gouldman's arrangement was perceived as creating an exotic sound. Yardbirds' drummer Jim McCarty recalled that "the riff on the demo [by Gouldman] suggested a sitar" and that the group's manager, Giorgio Gomelsky, hired a sitar and a tabla player for a recording session. Beck biographer Martin Power says that "For Your Love" had been made more memorable by a prominent harpsichord part (played by Brian Auger) and that may have influenced Gomelsky's decision. Beck also believes that the addition of an unusual instrument was an attempt to follow the successful incorporation of a harpsichord in their first hit. The use of sitar was a new approach and several months later, the Beatles recorded "Norwegian Wood", the first rock song released to incorporate a sitar part. Session guitarist Jimmy Page, who would later join the Yardbirds, was working in an adjacent studio and attended the session. His interest was piqued, and after the session he bought the musician's sitar, which Page later used for his own recordings.

== Composition and recording ==
"Heart Full of Soul"
Excerpt with guitar

The Yardbirds' first attempt to record "Heart Full of Soul" was on 13 April 1965 at Advision Studios in London. The session began with the sitar player playing the distinctive instrumental hook or riff. However, he was unfamiliar with the type of sound the group was trying to achieve – "It just didn't have any groove to it", Beck felt. McCarty added: "It was fine in principle, but while the tablas sounded OK, the sitar just wasn't up front enough. It just didn't cut through." (Note: Although the first session ended without a master track, a demo recording with sitar has been released on several Yardbirds' boxed sets.) Beck then developed a guitar part to replace the sitar line. He elaborated in an interview:

The sitar player couldn't get the 4/4 time signature right; it was a hopeless waste of time. So I said, 'Look, is this the figure?' I had the fuzz machine, a Toneblender [sic], going. We did one take, it sounded outrageous. So they kept the tabla player, who could just about make it work. They rushed that out, and the rest was a rollercoaster ride.

According to McCarty, Beck developed the riff after borrowing Page's prototype fuzz box, designed for him by Roger Mayer. When he played the lick for the band, they felt that it was a perfect fit: "this great sounding riff emerged ... I mean Beck just nailed it", rhythm guitarist Chris Dreja recalled. The group returned to Advision on 20 April to complete the song. Beck was able to achieve the sitar-like hook by bending the higher notes on his guitar using his own Sola Sound Tone Bender unit to get the distinctive tone. Music writer Alan di Perna describes it as "microtonal string bending", while Relf biographer David French calls Beck's sound a "violin-like fuzz". While simultaneously sounding the open D string, he also added a droning quality reminiscent of the sitar's sympathetic strings.

Beck's contribution was described in a June 1965 single pre-release review in Beat Instrumental as providing an "oriental touch" (Note: The Yardbirds recorded "Heart Full of Soul" ten days before joining a package tour of the UK with the Kinks. The Kinks subsequently recorded "See My Friends", which also incorporates Indian influences. Lavezzoli notes the timing: "It is tempting to speculate if the two bands had discussed their recent work with each other", but otherwise does not connect the two.) and it was seen as helping to introduce "the psychedelic subgenre known as 'raga rock'", according to di Perna. William Echard adds "'Heart Full of Soul,' released in June 1965, is often said to have marked the arrival of raga rock [and] be pivotal in shaping the look and sound of 1960s psychedelia." Music writers also identify Beck's use of a fuzz box as a milestone: according to French, "'Heart Full of Soul' was one of the first significant uses of fuzz guitar on record—taped a month before the Stones recorded '(I Can't Get No) Satisfaction'", while Lavezzoli states that the song is "the first time such a tone had been used, soon to be employed by Keith Richards".

Unterberger commented, however, that the song does not rely on gimmicks and has other aspects that make it compelling. He added that the vocal parts by lead singer Keith Relf, backed by atmospheric harmonies, provide contrasting melancholic and upbeat sections. According to French, "the new single's melancholy, hard-bitten lyrics were a perfect match to Keith's voice". The song is partly propelled by a strummed acoustic guitar by Relf, (Note: It is unclear if Yardbirds' rhythm guitarist Chris Dreja also plays on the song.) giving it an element of contemporary folk music or folk rock. McCarty and session bassist Ron Prentice (who also played bass on "For Your Love") comprise the rhythm section. Yardbirds' bassist Paul Samwell-Smith, who assumed the role of producer for "For Your Love", is listed as "Musical Director" on the Columbia 45 rpm single. Gomelsky received the credit as the song's producer.

== Releases ==
1965 US single picture sleeve with Eric Clapton

Less than three months after "For Your Love", "Heart Full of Soul" was released as the Yardbirds' first single since Clapton's departure. In the UK, Columbia issued it on 4 June 1965, with Epic Records following on 2 July 1965 in the US. The picture sleeve used by Epic featured a photo of the Clapton lineup instead of the Beck lineup; Epic's For Your Love album, released the month before, included a photo of Beck, but no image nor mention of Clapton. Epic released the group's next single, "I'm a Man", without a picture sleeve; Columbia did not use images for their 45s. In the UK, "Evil Hearted You", another Gouldman song, was the follow-up single. "Steeled Blues", a blues instrumental featuring Beck on slide guitar and Relf on harmonica, is included as the single's B-side.

"Heart Full of Soul" saw its first album release on the Yardbirds' second American LP, Having a Rave Up with the Yardbirds (1965). In Canada, Capitol Records included the song on both their first album, titled Heart Full of Soul (1965, also known as Presenting the Yardbirds), and second album, Having a Rave Up (1965). It was also chosen for the popular American compilation The Yardbirds Greatest Hits (1967). In the UK, the earliest album appearance was on Remember ... The Yardbirds, a collection of pre-Yardbirds (also known as Roger the Engineer) material released in 1971 after the group disbanded. Numerous later compilations include it, such as Ultimate! (2001), the comprehensive career retrospective released by Rhino Records.

== Broadcast and concert performances ==
The Yardbirds performed the song for broadcast on several occasions. Five days after the single was released, they taped it for the Ken Dodd Show, which aired on BBC Radio 20 and 23 June 1965. The recording later appeared on the album Yardbirds ... On Air (1991, re-released in 1999 as BBC Sessions). During the group's second American tour, they played "Heart Full of Soul" (and "I'm a Man") for Shivaree, a pop music variety television series. It was filmed at the KABC-TV studios in Hollywood on 3 January 1966 and aired on 8 January.

The song was part of the Yardbirds' concert repertoire and several live recordings have been issued. Three versions with Beck are included on Glimpses 1963–1968, a boxed set released in 2011. Versions with Page as the group's sole guitarist appear on the short-lived Live Yardbirds: Featuring Jimmy Page (1971), Last Rave-Up in LA (1979), Glimpses, and Yardbirds '68 (2017). These include the song as part of an extended medley with "You're a Better Man Than I".

== Chart performance and influence ==
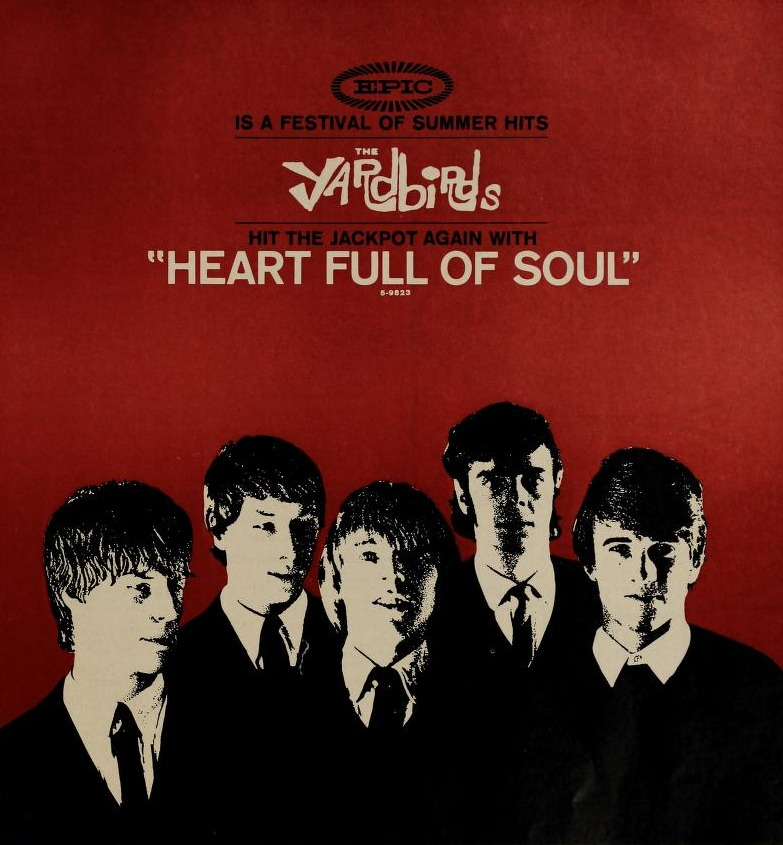
US magazine ad showing correct lineup with Jeff Beck

1965 singles charts
Chart	Peak	Ref(s)
Canada (RPM)	2	
New Zealand (Lever Hit Parade)	3	
Norway (VG-lista)	10	
UK (Record Retailer)	2	
US Billboard Hot 100	9	
US Cash Box Top Singles	12	
West Germany (GfK)	22	

A variety of musicians have recorded renditions of "Heart Full of Soul". In 1986, American roots rock artist Chris Isaak recorded the song. It was released as a single in 1987 and included on his self-titled second album. Critic Ned Raggett calls it "an attractive remake of the Yardbirds' 'Heart Full of Soul,' making it sound very much like an Isaak original instead of a worshipful carbon copy." Unterberger adds that Isaak's is "the most famous cover version". Canadian rock band Rush recorded it for their 2004 album of cover songs, Feedback. AllMusic's Thom Jurek describes it as "pure psychedelic Yardbirds elegance with a bunch of space and dimension added to redeem the track for the 21st century."

The Yardbirds' original song was used in the soundtrack of the 2010 film London Boulevard. The song plays as the protagonist (played by Colin Farrell) drives through London in a black convertible. Stephen Holden, writing for The New York Times, notes, "Enhancing the tarnished '60s ambience is a soundtrack that juxtaposes rock classics like 'Heart Full of Soul' from the Yardbirds [with current music]".
