= Little Games =

Studio album by the Yardbirds
- Released: July 1967
- Recorded: 5 March 1967; 29 April – 1 May 1967
- Studios: Olympic & De Lane Lea, London
- Genres: Rock; psychedelic rock
- Length: 30:28
- Label: Epic
- Producer: Mickie Most

The Yardbirds' US album chronology
The Yardbirds Greatest Hits (1967)	Little Games (1967)	Featuring Performances By: Jeff Beck Eric Clapton Jimmy Page (1970)

Little Games is the fourth American album by the English rock band the Yardbirds. Recorded and released in 1967, it was their first album recorded after becoming a quartet with Jimmy Page as the sole guitarist and Chris Dreja switching to bass. It was also the only Yardbirds album produced by Mickie Most.

Although the new lineup was becoming more experimental with longer, improvised concert performances, the Yardbirds' record company brought in successful singles producer Most to coax out more commercial product. However, neither material that properly presented their new approach nor hit singles were forthcoming. The release of the title track "Little Games" that preceded the album did not reach the singles chart in the UK and consequently the album was not released there. However, the album saw limited release in the US, Germany, and New Zealand, but only reached number 80 in the US.

Little Games became the Yardbirds' final studio album, although Most continued to produce singles for the group. These were later collected and released with the original album along with outtakes and alternate mixes on an expanded edition titled Little Games Sessions & More in 1992.

== Background ==
After the commercially and critically successful Yardbirds' albums Having a Rave Up with The Yardbirds (1965) and Yardbirds/Over Under Sideways Down a.k.a. Roger the Engineer (1966), founder member and bassist/musical director Paul Samwell-Smith left the group to pursue a career as a record producer. He was replaced on bass by studio guitarist Jimmy Page, whom the Yardbirds had originally approached to replace Eric Clapton. Page's position as bassist was temporary and within a short while he switched to second lead guitarist alongside Jeff Beck, with rhythm guitarist Chris Dreja taking over on bass. In 1966, the Beck/Page dual lead guitar line-up produced the psychedelic "Happenings Ten Years Time Ago", "Psycho Daisies" and "Stroll On", the updated remake of "The Train Kept A-Rollin'" for their appearance in Michelangelo Antonioni's film Blow-Up. However, by the end of 1966, Beck was fired from the band due to an illness that was preventing him from playing gigs while on tour in the US, and they continued as a quartet with Page as the sole guitarist.

During 1966 and 1967, much of the rock audience began to shift interest from Top 40 singles to albums and concert presentations. During this period, the Yardbirds toured the US extensively, with frequent shows at popular counterculture venues such as the Fillmore. They became more experimental, with longer, improvised sets including light shows, film clips, and audio samples. Their material became more varied and introduced songs such as "Dazed and Confused", the Jimmy Page solo-guitar piece "White Summer", the Velvet Underground's "I'm Waiting for the Man", and extended medleys with re-worked versions of "I'm a Man" and "Smokestack Lightning".

Despite this change in direction, Mickie Most, best known for producing hits for Herman's Hermits and Donovan, was brought in by EMI as the Yardbirds' new record producer. Most was not current with new music trends and although Page had worked earlier for Most as a session guitarist, he was reportedly displeased with Most taking on the production duties. According to biographer Gregg Russo, "the upshot of Most's involvement was that the Yardbirds' stage personality ended up becoming vastly different than their recording persona".

== Recording and production ==
The first Mickie Most-involved recordings took place at Olympic Studios in London on 5 March 1967. This session produced the single "Little Games" backed with "Puzzles". Although Dreja and drummer Jim McCarty were present to record "Little Games", Most used studio musicians John Paul Jones (bass and cello arrangement) and Dougie Wright (drums) for their parts to cut down on studio time. The remainder of the songs for Little Games were recorded during a three-day session at London's De Lane Lea Studios from 29 April to 1 May 1967 and session musicians were used, including Jones (bass on "No Excess Baggage") and Ian Stewart (piano on "Drinking Muddy Water"). One song, an acoustic guitar instrumental titled "White Summer" is a Jimmy Page solo piece. It uses a "DADGAD" guitar tuning, giving it an Eastern music sound, which is enhanced with Indian-percussion tabla played by Chris Karan and an oboe melody line. Another instrumental, "Glimpses", features guitar parts with Page using a wah-wah pedal and sampled train station and children's playground sounds after a voice-manipulated reading of a poem. Page's guitar is also prominent on "Tinker Tailor Soldier Sailor", where he introduced his guitar-bowing technique; "Drinking Muddy Water", which uses a slide-guitar part to follow the vocal line (later used to greater effect on Led Zeppelin's "You Shook Me"); and the instrumental breaks on "Smile on Me", including a wah-wah guitar coda.

The recording schedule was so hurried that the group often did not even hear the playbacks. Page recalled, "It was just so bloody rushed. Everything was done in one take because Mickie Most was basically interested in singles and didn't believe it was worth the time to do the tracks right on the album". Yardbirds' chronicler Gregg Russo notes the result was that "many [of the songs] have a demo quality that time shortages would not allow them to change". In fact one song, the pop-ish "Little Soldier Boy" was issued with McCarty's rough vocal guide providing the part intended for a trumpet.

The three subsequent singles recorded by the Yardbirds and later released on the expanded Little Games Sessions & More were given a similar treatment. Only singer Keith Relf appears on the cover version of "Ha! Ha! Said the Clown" (with Al Gorgoni on guitar, Rick Nielsen on organ, Joe Macho on bass and Bobby Gregg on drums, recorded at Columbia Studios New York on 13 June 1967 and Abbey Road Studios on 19 June 1967). Two more cover songs, "Ten Little Indians" (Jones on bass and orchestral arrangement and Clem Cattini on drums, Olympic Studios on 25 September 1967) and "Goodnight Sweet Josephine" (Nicky Hopkins on piano, Jones on bass and Cattini on drums, De Lane Lea in March 1968) also use session musicians. Only the B-side to their last single, the proto-heavy metal "Think About It", was recorded by the entire group. The song includes a guitar solo that Page had been using in the group's concert performances of "Dazed and Confused" (which he carried over, with some different lyrics, to Led Zeppelin).

== Writing and composition ==
Unlike the Yardbirds' three previous charting singles ("Shapes of Things", "Over Under Sideways Down" and "Happenings Ten Years Time Ago"), "Little Games" was not written by group members. Composed by Harold Spiro and Phil Wainman, its lyrics are echoed in Led Zeppelin's "Good Times Bad Times". Another pop song recorded was "No Excess Baggage", by the Brill Building songwriters Roger Atkins and Carl D'Errico, who composed the Animals Top 40 hit "It's My Life". Page adapted "White Summer" from Davy Graham's version of the Irish folk song "She Moved Through the Fair".

The remaining album songs are credited to the band members and include "Drinking Muddy Water", an interpretation of the blues classic "Rollin' and Tumblin'" and nominally a tribute to bluesman Muddy Waters, and "Smile on Me", a re-working of Howlin' Wolf's "Shake for Me" (which Wolf later re-worked for his "Killing Floor" which Led Zeppelin adapted for "The Lemon Song"). The Yardbirds also recorded "Stealing Stealing", a jug-band-style song that has been traced back to Gus Cannon's Jug Stompers and the Memphis Jug Band.

Russo describes the four and a half minute instrumental collage "Glimpses" as a "brilliant piece of psychedelic imagery [that] revealed the Yardbirds at their most experimental and inspired". It features multiple-guitar tracks, with effects and bowing, and an electric sitar-backing propelled along by a 6/8 beat and bass riff by McCarty and Dreja. Relf adds several tracks of chanting vocals, reminiscent of the Yardbirds' 1965 song "Still I'm Sad". A barely-understandable truncated mechanical-sounding voice recites:

Glimpses of clouds in a forest
Can review well within us
And never to linger on one is life
Energy radiates from the source
The life around us is but a reflection of our own
Flowing within never-ending boundless infinity
Time is just a cumular limit
Which with one glimpse can overcome
Can overcome

The psychedelic folk-style song "Only the Black Rose" is credited to Relf and features his vocal with acoustic guitar accompaniment by Page and some subdued percussion effects. Described as "reflective" and "emotive" by Russo, it foreshadows the future Relf/McCarty acoustic folk collaborations Together and Renaissance.

As with "Little Games" and unlike their previous hits, the Yardbirds' subsequent singles were written by others: Tony Hazzard composed "Ha Ha Said the Clown" (a pop hit for Manfred Mann) and the similarly pop-ish "Good Night Sweet Josephine" and Harry Nilsson supplied "Ten Little Indians", written in the style of a nursery rhyme.

== Release and critical reception ==
Professional ratings
Review scores
Source	Rating
AllMusic – Little Games	3/5 stars
AllMusic – Little Games Sessions & More	3/5 stars
The New Rolling Stone Album Guide – Little Games	3/5 stars

"Little Games" was released as a single on 24 March 1967 in the US and 21 April in the UK. It reached number 51 in the US, but failed to chart in the UK. As a result, EMI chose not to issue the album in the UK and it was released only in Canada, Germany, New Zealand, and the US. Issued by Epic in the US on 10 or 24 July 1967, Little Games made a relatively weak showing in the Billboard 200 album chart, peaking at number 80 during a two-month run in the chart.

A "Pop Spotlight" review in the 29 July 1967 Billboard magazine was generic, predicting that the album "should reach the charts in short order", but noted "Drinking Muddy Water" and "Smile On Max [sic]", the album's two guitar-heavy blues-rock songs, as "standouts". To put it into context, the magazine's album chart for the week included the Beatles' Sgt. Pepper's Lonely Hearts Club Band, the Rolling Stones' Flowers, Jefferson Airplane's Surrealistic Pillow and the self-titled debut albums The Doors and The Grateful Dead. The Yardbirds Greatest Hits, released in March 1967, was also in the chart where it remained into 1968 and placed at number 73 in the 100 best selling albums of 1967.

More recent reviews have generally found fault with Little Games. AllMusic's Bruce Eder gave it three out of five stars and wrote "If almost any group other than the Yardbirds had released Little Games, it would be considered a flawed but prime late-'60s psychedelic/hard rock artifact instead of a serious step backward, and even a disappointment". An AllMusic review by Dave Thompson of the expanded edition Little Games Sessions & More began "the day producer Mickie Most moved in on the Yardbirds was the day the Yardbirds' own values moved out. The union was a lousy idea from the start". The New Rolling Stone Album Guide writer also gave the album three out of five stars, calling it "a disastrous attempt at conventional pop". The Yardbirds themselves were just as critical – Page reportedly regarded Little Games as "horrible" and Jim McCarty described Mickie Most as "a protagonist in our downfall".

The subsequent Most-produced singles were further unsuccessful attempts to reach the pop market. Little Games soon went out of print, but after Led Zeppelin rose to stardom and Page became a focus of attention, fans and collectors sought out copies of the album and drove up prices, resulting in counterfeit copies being introduced. The scarcity of the last singles also led to the 1975 bootleg collection Golden Eggs, which was widely circulated and successful for its time. However, Little Games, along with singles, outtakes, alternate mixes was released by EMI as the two-CD expanded edition Little Games Sessions & More in 1992.

Of the last singles and tracks from Little Games, the only songs incorporated into the Yardbirds concert repertoire were "Drinking Muddy Water", the Jimmy Page showcase "White Summer" (later featured in Led Zeppelin concerts in a medley with "Black Mountain Side"), and the psychedelic "Glimpses", which was soon replaced by "Dazed and Confused" as a concert highlight.

== Track listing ==
=== Original 1967 album ===
Side one
No.	Title	Writer(s)	Length
1.	"Little Games"	Harold Spiro, Phil Wainman	2:25
2.	"Smile on Me"	Chris Dreja, Jim McCarty, Jimmy Page, Keith Relf	3:16
3.	"White Summer"	Page	3:56
4.	"Tinker, Tailor, Soldier, Sailor"	Page, McCarty	2:49
5.	"Glimpses"	Dreja, McCarty, Page, Relf	4:24

Side two
No.	Title	Writer(s)	Length
1.	"Drinking Muddy Water"	Dreja, McCarty, Page, Relf	2:53
2.	"No Excess Baggage"	Roger Atkins, Carl D'Errico	2:32
3.	"Stealing Stealing"	Dreja, McCarty, Page, Relf	2:42
4.	"Only the Black Rose"	Relf	2:52
5.	"Little Soldier Boy"	McCarty, Page, Relf	2:39

==== Epic album printing errors ====
Epic Records, having made several printing errors with Yardbirds material previously, made several more with Little Games. Chris Dreja's surname for the songwriting credits (previously misspelled as "Drega" on the album Over Under Sideways Down) was again misprinted on the album record labels, as "Ereja". This error also appears on the Epic "Drinking Muddy Water" single and the tracks "Smile on Me" and "Drinking Muddy Water" included on the 1970 American compilation The Yardbirds Featuring Performances By Jeff Beck, Eric Clapton, Jimmy Page. The US "Little Games" single (written by Harold Spiro and Phil Wainman) only lists the latter writer, misspelled as "Wienman".

Epic also mistakenly released a number of stereo versions of Little Games in mono version sleeves and pressed with mono LP labels. The three-letter prefix of the master numbers on the record labels and in the LP trail-out grooves properly identify the versions. "XEM" indicates genuine mono copies; if it shows "XSB" (even on the labels, despite the mono catalog number and no indication of STEREO under the Epic logo), it is a stereo pressing.

=== 1992 expanded edition ===
The expanded edition of Little Games, titled Little Games Sessions & More, was released by EMI America as a two-disc set featuring the original album, plus the singles "Ha Ha Said the Clown", "Ten Little Indians" and "Goodnight Sweet Josephine". Also included are several outtakes and alternate takes/mixes. A solo acoustic guitar mix of "White Summer" without the percussion and horn is included along with a version of "Glimpses" with different overdubs. The Yardbirds' final group single recording and one of the strongest with the Page lineup, "Think About It", also makes its first official album release here. Additionally, three songs recorded by the Keith Relf/Jim McCarty folk-duo Together and a fourth, credited to Relf and McCarty, are also included.

Disc one
No.	Title	Writer(s)	Length
1.	"Little Games" (stereo mix)	Harold Spiro, Phil Wainman	2:37
2.	"Smile on Me"	Chris Dreja, Jim McCarty, Jimmy Page, Keith Relf	3:15
3.	"White Summer" (1967 LP version)	Page	3:57
4.	"Tinker, Tailor, Soldier, Sailor" (1967 LP version)	Page, McCarty	2:51
5.	"Glimpses" (1967 LP version)	Dreja, McCarty, Page, Relf	4:21
6.	"Drinking Muddy Water" (stereo mix)	Dreja, McCarty, Page, Relf	2:51
7.	"No Excess Baggage"	Roger Atkins, Carl D'Errico	2:36
8.	"Stealing Stealing"	Dreja, McCarty, Page, Relf	2:33
9.	"Only the Black Rose"	Relf	2:48
10.	"Little Soldier Boy"	McCarty, Page, Relf	2:41
11.	"Puzzles"	Dreja, McCarty, Page, Relf	2:08
12.	"I Remember the Night"	Anthony Pirollo	3:01
13.	"Ha Ha Said the Clown" (mono)	Tony Hazzard	2:26
14.	"Ten Little Indians" (single version, mono)	Harry Nilsson	2:13
15.	"Goodnight Sweet Josephine" (single version, mono)	Hazzard	2:43
16.	"Think About It" (mono)	Dreja, McCarty, Page, Relf	3:46

Disc two
No.	Title	Writer(s)	Length
1.	"Little Games" (mono mix)	Spiro, Wainman	2:22
2.	"You Stole My Love" (instrumental demo)	Graham Gouldman	2:55
3.	"White Summer" (without accompaniment)	Page	3:51
4.	"Tinker, Tailor, Soldier, Sailor" (instrumental version)	Page, McCarty	2:51
5.	"L.S.D." (instrumental demo)	Dreja, McCarty, Page	1:00
6.	"Drinking Muddy Water" (mono mix)	Dreja, McCarty, Page, Relf	2:50
7.	"De Lane Lea Lee" (instrumental demo)	Dreja, McCarty, Page	2:33
8.	"Glimpses" (version w/different overdubs)	Dreja, McCarty, Page, Relf	4:18
9.	"Never Mind" (instrumental demo)	Dreja, McCarty, Page	2:46
10.	"Ten Little Indians" (instrumental version)	Nilsson	2:15
11.	"Goodnight Sweet Josephine" (alternate version)	Hazzard	2:42
12.	"Henry's Coming Home" (by Together)	McCarty, Relf	2:57
13.	"Love Mum and Dad" (by Together)	McCarty, Relf	3:48
14.	"Together Now" (by Together)	McCarty, Relf	3:02
15.	"Shining Where the Sun Has Been" (by McCarty and Relf)	McCarty, Relf	2:52
16.	"Great Shakes" (US radio advertisement)		1:01

== Chart positions ==
=== Album ===
Chart (1967)	Peak position
US Billboard 200	80

=== Singles ===
Year	Single	Chart	Position
1967	"Little Games"	US Billboard Hot 100	51
1967	"Little Games"	US Cash Box Top 100 Singles Chart	48
1967	"Little Games"	US Record World 100 Top Pop Chart	44
1967	"Little Games"	Australian Go-Set Top 40 Singles Chart	27
1967	"Little Games"	New Zealand (Listener)	11
1967	"Ha Ha Said the Clown"	US Billboard Hot 100	45
1967	"Ha Ha Said the Clown"	US Cash Box Top 100	52
1967	"Ha Ha Said the Clown"	US Record World 100	45
1967	"Ten Little Indians"	US Billboard Hot 100	96
1967	"Ten Little Indians"	US Cash Box Top 100	71
1968	"Goodnight Sweet Josephine"	US Billboard "Bubbling Under the Hot 100"	127

== Personnel ==
The Yardbirds

- Keith Relf – vocals, harmonica, percussion
- Jimmy Page – guitars
- Chris Dreja – bass guitar (except where indicated below), backing vocals
- Jim McCarty – drums (except where indicated below), percussion, backing vocals

Additional personnel

- Clem Cattini – drums on "Ten Little Indians" and "Goodnight Sweet Josephine"
- Bobby Gregg – drums on "Ha Ha Said The Clown"
- Nicky Hopkins – keyboards on "Goodnight Sweet Josephine" (version 1)
- John Paul Jones – bass guitar on "Goodnight Sweet Josephine" and "No Excess Baggage" (original album), bass and cello arrangement on "Little Games" (original album), bass and orchestral arrangement on "Ten Little Indians"
- Chris Karan – tabla on "White Summer"
- Joe Macho – bass on "Ha Ha Said the Clown"
- Rick Nielsen – organ on "Ha Ha Said the Clown"
- Ian Stewart – piano on "Drinking Muddy Water" (original album)
- Dougie Wright – drums on "Little Games" (original album)
- Unidentified – oboe on "White Summer"
- Mickie Most – producer
