= James Grashow =

American artist (1942–2025)

Jimmy Grashow
- Born: January 16, 1942; Brooklyn, New York, U.S.
- Died: September 15, 2025 (aged 83); Redding, Connecticut, U.S.
- Education: Pratt Institute
- Occupations: Sculptor and woodcut artist

James Bruce Grashow (January 16, 1942 – September 15, 2025) was an American sculptor and woodcut artist. He is perhaps best known for his sculptures and large-scale installations (such as cities, fountains, and menageries) made of cardboard.

Grashow was born in Brooklyn, New York, on January 16, 1942 to a Jewish family. He struggled with dyslexia as a child, but went on to receive BFA (1963) and MFA (1965) degrees from Pratt Institute. He then received a Fulbright Travel Grant to study in Florence. Based in Redding, Connecticut, his works have been exhibited at many museums including the DeCordova Museum and Sculpture Park in Lincoln, Massachusetts; the Art Complex Museum in Duxbury, Massachusetts; the Center for the Arts at SUNY Purchase the Taubman Museum of Art in Roanoke, Virginia, and the Aldrich Contemporary Art Museum in Ridgefield, Connecticut.

Grashow also created cover art for record albums such as Jethro Tull's 1969 album Stand Up and the 1971 Yardbirds album Live Yardbirds: Featuring Jimmy Page.

He is the subject of a 2012 documentary entitled The Cardboard Bernini, describing the creation, exhibition, anticipated decay, and ultimate destruction of an enormous cardboard fountain, inspired by the Trevi Fountain in Rome and the work of Gian Lorenzo Bernini.

James is also featured in a 2025 documentary titled Jimmy & The Demons from director Cindy Meehl. The film premiered at the 2025 Tribeca Film Festival. Grashow died at the age of 83 on September 15, 2025 in Redding, Connecticut, from pancreatic cancer.
