= Happenings Ten Years Time Ago =

1966 song by the Yardbirds

- US picture sleeve

Single by the Yardbirds
- B-side: "Psycho Daisies" (UK); "The Nazz Are Blue" (US)
- Released: 21 October 1966
- Recorded: July–October 1966
- Studio: IBC, London; De Lane Lea, London
- Genre: Freakbeat; psychedelic rock; psychedelic pop
- Length: 2:55
- Label: Columbia (UK); Epic (US)
- Songwriters: Keith Relf; Jim McCarty; Jeff Beck; Jimmy Page
- Producer: Simon Napier-Bell

The Yardbirds singles chronology
"Over Under Sideways Down" (1966)	"Happenings Ten Years Time Ago" (1966)	"Little Games" (1967)

"Happenings Ten Years Time Ago" is a song by the English rock group the Yardbirds. Written and recorded in 1966, it is considered one of their most progressive works. The song was the group's first to feature the dual-lead guitar line-up of Jeff Beck and Jimmy Page. The two contribute an array of guitar parts during the instrumental sections, described as "a full-on six-string apocalypse". Lyrically, it deals with notions of past life and déjà vu.

The song was released as a single and received mixed reviews and was less commercially successful than the group's previous efforts. More recently, it has been acknowledged for its inventiveness and contribution to the early development of psychedelic music. Several elements of the song have influenced songs by other musicians.

== Background ==
"Happenings Ten Years Time Ago" came about in the period after Yardbirds' founding bassist Paul Samwell-Smith left the group to pursue record production full-time. In June 1966, he was replaced by studio guitarist Jimmy Page, who agreed to serve as bassist until rhythm guitarist Chris Dreja gained some proficiency on the instrument. The Yardbirds maintained a heavy schedule of live appearances that coincided with the release of their latest single, "Over Under Sideways Down". Page recalls that he had become stifled with studio work, and by playing bass live with the Yardbirds he was able to come up with new ideas when he returned to the guitar.

During the group's American tour in August and September, the Yardbirds' lead guitarist Jeff Beck experienced health and personal issues. For the shows that he missed, Page took over on lead, while Dreja switched to bass. When the group returned to the UK, Beck and Page became co-lead guitarists, with Dreja formally switching to bass. With this line-up change also came a shift in musical styles. The band had already undergone a stylistic shift two years prior when they moved beyond the repertoire of older American blues and R&B songs then in fashion among the early beat and British rhythm and blues groups, which had prompted Eric Clapton to leave the group. With two lead guitarists in the group, the Yardbirds now explored a different approach. Rather than trading solos while the other played rhythm guitar, Page explains:

We rehearsed hard on all sorts of riffs to things like "Over Under Sideways Down" which we were doing in harmonies and we worked out where we'd play rehearsed phrases together. It was the sort of thing that people like Wishbone Ash and Quiver [later] perfected, that dual-lead-guitar idea.

Beck's and Page's guitar interplay also resulted in the music getting "heavier", as heard in parts of "Beck's Bolero", an instrumental recorded by the two five months earlier for a Beck solo project. Between 23 September and 9 October, the new configuration toured Britain with the Rolling Stones for a dozen shows. During this time, the Yardbirds also recorded "Happenings Ten Years Time Ago" and were filmed performing "Stroll On", an updated version of "The Train Kept A-Rollin'" with new lyrics, for their appearance in Michelangelo Antonioni's film Blowup.

== Composition ==
The lyrics themselves had considerable poignancy, relating to experiences of déjà vu or even past-life existences—appropriately complex subject matter as the pop-based first half of the 1960s gave way to the rockier second half.

— Biographer Chris Salewicz (2019)

After Samwell-Smith's departure, Yardbirds singer Keith Relf and drummer Jim McCarty spent more time together and began exploring shared interests in mystical ideas popular among the counterculture, including the concept of reincarnation. While the two were at Relf's home, they started with an idea for a song with a theme of "being reborn, living before" and déjà vu. (Note: Over the years, McCarty has given somewhat different accounts about how much was initially completed by the two. In one, he claims that he and Relf developed the tune and chords; in his autobiography, he writes that the two focused on the lyrics; and Russo writes, "McCarty also confirms that Relf wrote its lyrics about reincarnation during an acid trip".) Relf's lyrics, as heard in the finished recording, include: "It seems to me I've been here before, the sounds I heard and the sights I saw / Was it real or was it in my dreams, I need to know what it all means".

Later, Page became involved in the recording studio:

Relf had a little bit of music recorded on a tape recorder – it was sort of a riff pattern for a song. I worked on the riff and the structure of it, and we'd got it all ready by the time Beck eventually showed up. He just put some guitar on top of it and that was that.

In another interview, Page explained that some of the material he contributed to the Yardbirds was actually developed while he was still a studio guitarist and asserted that "Happenings Ten Years Time Ago" was "basically my thing".

"Happenings Ten Years Time Ago" is composed of four main sections: vocal verses with the main rhythmic accompaniment, chorus, an instrumental middle, and an instrumental closing. The song is in the key of E minor, with a moderate tempo of 127 beats per minute in common time. (Note: The cover image for sheet music published by Leo Feist in 1966 included an old photo of the group when Eric Clapton and Samwell-Smith were still members.) The song begins with a four-bar instrumental opening, then settles into the main rhythm, which music educator William Echard describes as "distorted punctuating chords, a repeated descending chromatic line, and drums with strong accents on every beat", along with electric bass. The accompaniment continues through Relf's first verses, then transitions to a Gregorian chant–inspired interlude. McCarty adds a harmony to Relf's vocal while single guitar chords are played, which suggest "tones of the ritualistic, epic, and ancient". This soon gives way to the chorus, which includes repeating two-note figures on guitar, that "underscores the ominous, tense mood".

After cycling through more verse and chorus sections, the first instrumental section begins. Group chronicler Greg Russo describes that it "took off on an astounding tangent, with Page's guitar imitating a police siren before guitar explosions and a searing Beck solo worked around Jeff's Cockney-influenced recitation". However, Guitar World's Alan Di Perna attributes the mock siren to Beck: "An ominous European-style police siren—courtesy of Beck's guitar—leads the way into a full-on six-string apocalypse with atomic bomb blasts and shards of scarified riffing." The multiple overdubbed guitar solos are played by both Beck and Page, or by Beck with Page on rhythm guitar, and "sounded like duelling fighter planes", according to journalist Bob Stanley.

During the recording sessions, Beck provided some humour by imitating comments made by an attendant who examined members of the group at a sexual health clinic. Although Beck's recitation is broken up and unclear under the guitar solos, McCarty describes it as a "note-perfect impersonation ... We fell about laughing and of course it had to stay on the record." (Note: Russo transcribes Beck's impersonation as, "Pop group, are ya? Bet you're making money ... (devious laugh) Why you lot wear your long hair? I bet you're appearing in a club again, are you? Singing every night there on stage ..." However, others, including McCarty, also hear Beck saying "Bet you're pulling the crumpet, ain't you?") After another verse and chorus, there is an instrumental closing section "which intensifies the chaotic, sinister tone of the song" that begins with droning feedback on the bass strings of the guitar, and includes multiple guitar lines over the main rhythmic accompaniment, before ending with a quick fade-out.

== Recording ==
"Happenings Ten Years Time Ago" was recorded in London during breaks in the Yardbirds touring schedule. According to McCarty, it began when he, Relf, and Page went into a recording studio to develop some new material. Page brought in fellow studio musician John Paul Jones, who had previously played on "Beck's Bolero" and would later become Page's bandmate in Led Zeppelin, to provide the bass part, since Dreja had yet to fully adapt to the instrument. The four proceeded to jam on some chords and lyrics and the song started to take form. However, there is some disagreement on the location and date for recording the basic song or backing track:

- McCarty identifies the IBC Studios in Marylebone, but does not give a date.
- Beck biographer Martin Power places an IBC session at the beginning of August 1966 (the group left for an American tour on 3 August).
- Russo indicates a basic track recording session at De Lane Lea Studios in Soho on 26 July.
- Group biographer Alan Clayson lists the 26 July IBC session as "likely cancelled" and the basic track as being recorded at De Lane Lea on 20 September.

However, there is agreement for various overdubs made between 20 September and 2 October at De Lane Lea; Beck, who had been unavailable for the earlier sessions, recorded several guitar parts and his spoken passage during this time. The recording was engineered by Dave Siddle and the mix was completed by about 3 October.

== Releases and charts ==
In the UK, "Happenings Ten Years Time Ago" was released as a single by the Columbia Graphophone Company on 21 October 1966. "Psycho Daisies", a new song recorded during the same sessions, was used for the B-side. It is based on the 1959 Eddie Cochran song "Somethin' Else" and Beck provides the guitar and vocal, with Page on bass, and McCarty on drums. The single peaked at No. 43 during a five-week appearance on the Record Retailer singles chart. On 4 November, Epic Records issued the single in the US, which was coupled with another vocal by Beck, "The Nazz Are Blue", (Note: Todd Rundgren explained in 2017: "'Happenings Ten Years Time Ago' was a significant song for me because the B-side [in America] was 'The Nazz Are Blue' and in 1967, when I started my first band, we called ourselves the Nazz and that's where we found the name. The Yardbirds were a huge influence on me, I had to do a Yardbirds song [for the 1976 album Faithful], and I wanted one with a signature Yardbirds rave-up in it.") taken from the Yardbirds' 1966 self-titled album (also known as Roger the Engineer in the UK and Over Under Sideways Down in the US). There, it was more successful, reaching No. 30 on the Billboard Hot 100 chart, during a stay of nine weeks. In Canada, the single, backed with "Psycho Daisies", reached No. 31.

The song made its first album appearance in April 1967 on the Epic anthology The Yardbirds Greatest Hits. It was followed in October by the Capitol Canada compilation, The Hits of the Yardbirds, which also includes the song. Because of cross licensing problems, most subsequent anthologies and retrospective Yardbirds albums are limited to pre-Yardbirds/Over Under Sideways Down recordings (before April 1966). However, it is included on the 1983 Epic expanded reissue of the 1966 UK album Yardbirds (Roger the Engineer); Beckology, the 1991 Epic/Legacy boxed set featuring Jeff Beck; and Ultimate!, the 2001 comprehensive Yardbirds retrospective by Rhino Entertainment.

The first singles and albums often have errors or are incomplete in listing the songwriters:

- Columbia single (UK): "Yardbirds" (no individual songwriters)
- Epic single (US): "C. Drega, K. Relf, P. Samwell-Smith, J. McCarthy, J. Beck"
- Epic album (US): "K. Relf, J. McCarthy, G. Beck, J. Page"
- Capitol single (Canada): "Dreja, McCarty, Beck, Samwell-Smith"
- Capitol album (Canada): "Relf, Dreja, McCarty, Beck, Page"

For the 1966 US copyright filing, the songwriters are shown as "Keith Relf, James McCarty, Jeff Beck & Jimmy Page". This reflects the four group members who participated in the recording and is consistent with statements by the three survivors. These four also appear in the songwriter credits for Beckology and Ultimate!.

== Broadcast and concert performances ==
Two days before Columbia issued the single, the Yardbirds were filmed performing "Happenings Ten Years Time Ago" for BBC Television. It was broadcast on the music variety programme Top of the Pops on 17 November 1966. McCarty recalls that he and Dreja produced a short film, which he describes as "a precursor to the modern pop video", prior to departing for another US tour. It was delivered to the show's producer, with the expectation that it would be aired during their absence from the UK. However, a second performance of the song on Top of the Pops was never broadcast, and McCarty believes that it "disappeared into the bowels of BBC, never to be seen again".

After a concert performance at the Fillmore in San Francisco on 23 October, the group were filmed miming to "Happenings Ten Years Time Ago" for television. It was the first appearance by a rock group on a programme hosted by veteran comedian Milton Berle, who preceded their performance with "An ancient English philosopher once said ... if you want to add wild sounds to your shows, let the yardbirds of paradise fly up your nose". It was broadcast on 2 December and biographer David French writes: "Unfortunately, the band did not look very enthusiastic miming to the record and bad psychedelic effects marred the entire appearance."

In concert, "Happenings Ten Years Time Ago" was performed by the dual lead guitar line-up, until Beck left the group at the end of October 1966. The Yardbirds continued to tour as a four piece into 1968, with all the guitar parts played by Page. A performance on 15 March 1967 was filmed for West German television and the audio is included on the semi-official Cumular Limit (2000) and Glimpses 1963–1968 (2011) compilation albums.

== Critical reception ==
=== Contemporary reviews ===
When "Happenings Ten Years Time Ago" was released in 1966, critical rock journalism was limited to a small number of publications. The Yardbirds' earlier single "Shapes of Things", released in February 1966, became the first song by a British group to be described as "psychedelic". However, the term soon became overused, and "the Yardbirds had been caught up in an English backlash against the emerging drug culture". (Note: Relf addressed the issue in an interview with Melody Maker: "It's a pity the term [psychedelic] has been so distorted in Britain and the British seem to have turned their backs on it before it really started." In his autobiography, McCarty notes: "Six months later, of course, at the height of the [1967] Summer of Love, it [the song] would have slipped seamlessly into the scene. But that's hindsight talking. In October 1966, when [the single] was released, nobody knew there would be a Summer of Love, or anything else.") A review by Penny Valentine for the UK weekly Disc and Music Echo was harsh:

I have had enough of this sort of excuse for music. It is not clever, it is not entertaining, it is not informative. It is boring and pretentious. I am tired of people like the Yardbirds thinking that this sort of thing is clever. And if I hear the word psychedelic mentioned I will go nuts.

In the US, the reaction was markedly different. The song received a favourable review in Billboard magazine's "Pop Spotlights" column: "Infectious driving beat and unusual arrangement combined with an off-beat lyric content makes this hot contender for a fast chart climber." In a record column for KRLA Beat magazine, Eden distinguished between "psychedelic" and "commercialized electronic noise" and wrote:

Listen closely to this disc – the elements of melody and rhythm remain constant and at a level of perfection and listenability throughout the record. And that instrumental break in the middle of the record is beyond belief. (Note: The song reached as high as No. 8 in KRLA's polling of listeners' requests. It also reached No. 12 on KHJ (AM)'s "Boss 30" and it and KFWB were calling the single another "futuristic sound of the Yardbirds".)

=== Retrospective assessments ===
In a song review for AllMusic, Matthew Greenwald describes "Happenings Ten Years Time Ago" as "one of the greatest, lost singles from the 1966/1967 era ... this very progressive record was somewhat lost in the shuffle." He adds:

Led by a dark, Middle Eastern/psychedelic guitar riff, the song is quickly transformed into a frenetic, almost psychopathic rhythm, giving the whole affair a weird and powerful atmosphere. The idea of going back and forwards into time is paramount here, and was certainly one with the overall psychedelic ambience of the time.

Music historian Bob Gulla effuses in Guitar Gods: The 25 Players Who Made Rock History, "a towering masterpiece of psychedelic pop; [it] occupies the pinnacle of the entire psychedelic genre". In a similar vein, biographer Martin Power comments: "If the Yardbirds had invented or at least contributed heavily to the birth of psychedelic music in their past, they had come to define it with 'Happenings Ten Years Time Ago'."

In his book 1966: The Year the Decade Exploded, Jon Savage writes: "It was a compressed pop-art explosion, with a ferocious staccato guitar figure, a massive descending riff and rolling instrumental break and LSD-inspired lyrics that questioned the construction of reality and the nature of time." He adds that such experimentalism came at a cost: "The musicians were seen as overreaching themselves; they had lost an influential reviewer [Valentine] and were in danger of losing their audience." However, author Frank Hoffman sees it as following "Shapes of Things" in "enabl[ing] the Yardbirds to remain commercially viable despite a pronounced experimental orientation". Music writer Keith Shadwick feels it was their last single that showed them to be ahead of the curve.

In When Giants Walked the Earth, author Mick Wall comments on the forward-looking aspects of the song: "This was more than simple pop psychedelia. This was ground zero for seventies rock. Hypnotically interweaving, Eastern-influenced guitars, weapons-grade rhythms." Other writers also describe it as pointing the way towards heavy metal: "soar[ing] into a unique psychedelic/metal mode" (Eder); and "presages the hard rock and heavy metal sounds of the 1970s and 1980s" (Stuessy, Lipscomb). Far Out magazine contributor Arun Starkey writes in a 9 January 2022 article "Jimmy Page's 10 best songs with and without Led Zeppelin":

A psychedelic rock chef-d'oeuvre, "Happenings Ten Years Time Ago" is credited with helping to influence the creation of metal genre ... Slightly ominous-sounding, the dovetailing guitars of Beck and Page are intelligent, and today the track remains as stellar as it was when released in 1966 ... in many ways, "Happenings Ten Years Time Ago" set Page on his path to forming Led Zeppelin, wherein he’d perfect his long-standing aim of modifying rock in a much weightier way.

== Legacy ==
We weren't interested that much in the Beatles, but we were more interested in Jeff Beck's guitar sound like on "Happenings Ten Years Time Ago".

— Alice Cooper, quoted in Welcome to My Nightmare (2012)

"Happenings Ten Years Time Ago" appears at number three on Record Collector's chronological list of the "100 Greatest Psychedelic Records". Elements of the song have influenced or inspired several other artists. Pink Floyd biographer Julian Palacios writes that Syd Barrett "assimilates" the instrumental section for "Candy and a Currant Bun". French identifies Love's "A House Is Not a Motel" (parts of the solos played by two guitars) and the uptempo part of the Stooges' "I'm Sick of You" (the main riff). Guitarist Mark Arm of Mudhoney explained its influence on "Touch Me I'm Sick": "if you look to the origins of that riff it's actually like the Yardbirds' 'Happenings Ten Years Time Ago' and/or the fast part of the Stooges' 'I'm Sick of You'." (Note: Other possible influences have been suggested: Keith Richards' "staccato" guitar style on the Rolling Stones' "Sympathy for the Devil" (Malvinni) and Keith Moon's "similar exchange of dialogue" to Beck's spoken passage on the Who's "I Need You" (Atkins).)

When Jimi Hendrix first met Beck in London in 1966, he asked him about the feedback he used on "Happenings Ten Years Time Ago". Beck recalls that Hendrix told him, "You know that lick you did on 'Happenings Ten Years Time Ago'? I swiped that." (Note: Hendrix's composition "Stone Free", which appears as the B-side to his first UK single "Hey Joe" was recorded on 2 November 1966, shortly after the release of "Happenings Ten Years Time Ago", and uses the same studio and engineer. Although several authors have written otherwise over the years, in a 25 August 1967 interview with the Los Angeles Free Press, Hendrix said: "I wasn't really influenced by Beck. I only heard one record by him, 'The Shapes of Things', and I really dug it. I just listened to it and I liked it.") Di Perna writes:

The cataclysmic bomb blasts and siren wails that Jeff Beck coaxed from his guitar and amp on "Happenings Ten Years Time Ago", clearly paved the way for Jimi Hendrix's similarly bellicose rendition of "The Star Spangled Banner" at Woodstock some three years later.

In the late 1960s, prior to joining Big Star, Chris Bell performed "Happenings Ten Years Time Ago" in concert. To approximate Beck's sound going into the instrumental middle section, a pre-recorded slowed-down sound of an explosion was used as Bell went into his guitar solo. Daryl Easlea writes in his biography of the American rock duo Sparks: "It [the song] was three minutes of surreal, psychedelic aural imagery. [The Mael brothers] Ron and Russell would listen to it and marvel at its wonder and it was to become something of a touchstone for their early work." Todd Rundgren, who produced Sparks' first album, recorded a cover of the song for his 1976 album Faithful, the entire first side of which consisted of covers of songs popular in 1966. In a review of Faithful, Stephen Thomas Erlewine calls this version a "re-creation, with Rundgren 'faithfully' replicating the sound and feel of the Yardbirds [original]".

== Personnel ==
The Yardbirds

- Keith Relf – lead vocals
- Jeff Beck – electric guitar, vocals (spoken)
- Jimmy Page – electric guitar
- Jim McCarty – drums, backing vocals

Additional musicians

- John Paul Jones – bass guitar

Production

- Simon Napier-Bell – producer
- Dave Siddle – recording engineer

== Bibliography ==
- "Pop Spotlights: Top 20 – Yardbirds". Billboard. Vol. 78, no. 46. 12 November 1966. ISSN 0006-2510.
- "Hot 100". Billboard. Vol. 79, no. 3. 21 January 1967. ISSN 0006-2510.
- Atkins, John (2000). The Who on Record: A Critical History, 1963–1998. Jefferson, North Carolina: McFarland. ISBN 0-7864-0609-7.
- Carson, Annette (2001). Jeff Beck: Crazy Fingers. San Francisco: Backbeat Books. ISBN 0-87930-632-7.
- Clayson, Alan (2002). The Yardbirds. San Francisco: Backbeat Books. ISBN 0-87930-724-2.
- Clayson, Alan (2006). Led Zeppelin: The Origin of the Species: How, Why and Where It All Began (1st. ed.). UK: Chrome Dreams. ISBN 1-84240-345-1.
- Dawbarn, Bob (21 January 1967). "'We've Gone Stale,' Says Yardbird Keith". Melody Maker. ISSN 0025-9012.
- Di Perna, Alan (2012). Guitar Masters: Intimate Portraits. Hal Leonard. ISBN 978-1423489887.
- Easlea, Daryl (2010). Talent Is an Asset: The Story of Sparks. London: Omnibus Press. ISBN 978-0-85712-237-7.
- Echard, William (2017). Psychedelic Popular Music: A History through Musical Topic Theory. Bloomington, Indiana: Indiana University Press. ISBN 978-0253026590.
- Eden (3 December 1966). "DISCussion". KRLA Beat. Vol. 2, no. 29. Hollywood, California.
- French, David (2020). Heart Full of Soul: Keith Relf of the Yardbirds. Jefferson, North Carolina: McFarland & Company. ISBN 978-1-4766-8011-8.
- Gulla, Bob (2009). Guitar Gods: The 25 Players Who Made Rock History. Westport, Connecticut: Greenwood Press. ISBN 978-0-313-35806-7.
- Helander, Brock (1999). Rocking Sixties: The People Who Made th Music. London: Schirmer Books. ISBN 978-0-02-864873-6.
- Hicks, Michael (2000). Sixties Rock: Garage, Psychedelic, and Other Satisfactions. University of Illinois Press. ISBN 978-0252069154.
- Hoffman, Frank (2008). Chronology of American Popular Music, 1900–2000. New York City: Taylor & Francis. ISBN 978-0415977159.
- Hulett, Ralph; Prochnicky, Jerry (2011). Whole Lotta Led: Our Flight with Led Zeppelin. Citadel Press. ISBN 978-0806535555.
- Koda, Cub; Russo, Gregg (2001). Ultimate! (Boxed set booklet). The Yardbirds. Los Angeles: Rhino Records. OCLC 781357622. R2 79825.
- Malvinni, David (2016). Experiencing the Rolling Stones: A Listener's Companion. Lanham, Maryland: Rowman & Littlefield. ISBN 978-0810889200.
- McCarty, Jim (2018). Nobody Told Me. ISBN 978-0-244-96650-8.
- McDermott, John; Kramer, Eddie; Cox, Billy (2009). Ultimate Hendrix. New York City: Backbeat Books. ISBN 978-0-87930-938-1.
- Palacios, Julian (2010). Syd Barrett & Pink Floyd: Dark Globe (1st. ed.). London: Plexus Publishing. ISBN 978-0-85965-431-9.
- Power, Martin (2014). Hot Hired Guitar: The Life of Jeff Beck. London: Omnibus Press. ISBN 978-1-78323-386-1.
- Roby, Steven (2012). Hendrix on Hendrix: Interviews and Encounters with Jimi Hendrix. Chicago Review Press. ISBN 978-1-61374-322-5.
- Russo, Greg (2016). Yardbirds: The Ultimate Rave-Up. Floral Park, New York: Crossfire Publications. ISBN 978-0-9791845-7-4.
- Salewicz, Chris (2019). Jimmy Page: The Definitive Biography. New York City: Da Capo Press. ISBN 978-0-306-84538-3.
- Savage, Jon (2015). 1966: The Year the Decade Exploded. London: Faber & Faber. ISBN 978-0-571-36855-6.
- Schwartz, Roberta Freund (2015). "The Yardbirds (1963–1968)". In Moskowitz, David V. (ed.). The 100 Greatest Bands of All Time. Santa Barbara, California: ABC-Clio. ISBN 978-1440803406.
- Shadwick, Keith (2005). Led Zeppelin: The Story of a Band and Their Music 1968–1980 (1st. ed.). San Francisco, California: Backbeat Books. ISBN 978-0-87930-871-1.
- Simonelli, David (2013). Working Class Heroes: Rock Music and British Society in the 1960s and 1970s. Lanham, Maryland: Lexington Books. ISBN 978-0739170519.
- Stanley, Bob (2014). Yeah! Yeah! Yeah!: The Story of Pop Music from Bill Haley to Beyoncé. W. W. Norton. ISBN 978-0393242706.
- Stuessy, Joe; Lipscomb, Scott David (2009). Rock and Roll: Its History and Stylistic Development. Upper Saddle River, New Jersey: Pearson Prentice Hall. ISBN 978-0136010685.
- Thompson, Dave (2012). Alice Cooper: Welcome to My Nightmare. London: Omnibus Press. ISBN 978-0-85712-781-5.
- Tolinski, Brad (2012). Light and Shade: Conversations with Jimmy Page. Crown Publishing Group. ISBN 978-0-307-98573-6.
- Tudor, Dean (1983). Popular Music: An Annotated Guide to Recordings. Libraries Unlimited. ISBN 978-0872873957.
- Tupica, Rich (2020). There Was a Light: The Cosmic History of Chris Bell and the Rise of Big Star. New York City: Permuted Press. ISBN 978-1-68261-929-2.
- Wall, Mick (2019). When Giants Walked the Earth: A Biography of Led Zeppelin (10th. Anniversary ed.). New York City: St. Martin's Griffin. ISBN 978-1250215604.
- Wells, David (2005). Record Collector 100 Greatest Psychedelic Records. London: Diamond. OCLC 64309597.
- Yorke, Ritchie (1993). Led Zeppelin: The Definitive Biography. Novato, California: Underwood-Miller. ISBN 0-88733-177-7.
