= For Your Love (album) =

Studio album by the Yardbirds
- Released: June 1965
- Recorded: March 1964 – April 1965
- Studios: Olympic, IBC and Advision, London
- Genre: Blues rock
- Length: 31:04
- Label: Epic
- Producer: Giorgio Gomelsky (Note: Manfred Mann produced the "Sweet Music" track only.)

The Yardbirds US album chronology
For Your Love (1965)	Having a Rave Up with the Yardbirds (1965)

For Your Love is the first American album by the English rock band the Yardbirds. Released in June 1965, (Note: Group chronicler Greg Russo also gives a secondary "street" release date of 5 July 1965.) it contains new studio recordings along with previously released singles. The album features some of the earliest recordings by guitarists Eric Clapton and his replacement Jeff Beck.

The Yardbirds' manager, Giorgio Gomelsky, who selected the songs, planned to capitalise on the group's hit "For Your Love". The album, released as the Yardbirds were preparing for their first American tour, reached number 96 in Billboard Top LPs chart. It was unissued in the UK, although the songs with Beck were released in August 1965 on the Five Yardbirds EP.

== Recording and composition ==
For Your Love features Eric Clapton on lead guitar on eight of the album's eleven songs. These tracks include the three Yardbirds singles (with B-sides) released up to that time and two demos which were not released in the UK until the 1980s (see discography for singles information). Three songs came from Jeff Beck's first recording sessions with the Yardbirds: "I'm Not Talking", "I Ain't Done Wrong", and "My Girl Sloopy".

"I Ain't Done Wrong" was solely credited as a Keith Relf composition, as part of the group's desire to emulate the Beatles and some other British groups that were doing their own songwriting. In reality, though, "I Ain't Done Wrong" was largely a rewrite of Elmore James' "Done Somebody Wrong", his rewrite of Eddie Kirkland's original "I Must Have Done Somebody Wrong". by way of

Clapton, who had left the band four months before the album's release, is not pictured on its cover nor mentioned in the liner notes. Group chronicler Gregg Russo notes, "The cover was somewhat of a joke, as Jeff Beck was humorously seated in front of a keyboard that he did not play on the album."

== Charts and reception ==
Professional ratings
Review scores
Source	Rating
AllMusic	3/5 stars

The album reached number 96 in Billboard's Top LPs chart. It was the Yardbirds' first charting album; their British debut, Five Live Yardbirds, did not reach the UK Albums Chart and was not issued in the US.

In a retrospective review, AllMusic writer Bruce Eder gave the album three out of five stars, who notes the inconsistency of the Gomelsky-selected material. He describes the songs with Beck as "hard, loud, blazing showcases ... show[ing] where the band was really heading" and although the material with Clapton is "primitive" compared to his later efforts, it "was some of the best blues-based rock & roll of its era [1964]."

== Track listing ==
=== Original album ===
Songwriter credits are taken from the original Epic LP. However, since the running times are not given, those from The Yardbirds Story (2002), produced by Gomelsky, are used instead.

Side 1
No.	Title	Writer(s)	Lead guitar/ recording date(s)	Length
1.	"For Your Love"	Graham Gouldman	Eric Clapton, 1 February 1965	2:28
2.	"I'm Not Talking"	Mose Allison	Jeff Beck, 13 April 1965	2:31
3.	"Putty (In Your Hands)"	Kay Rogers, John Patton	Clapton, November 1964	2:11
4.	"I Ain't Got You"	Calvin Carter	Clapton, 19 September 1964	1:59
5.	"Got to Hurry" (take 3)	Oscar Rasputin a.k.a. Giorgio Gomelsky (Note: In his 2007 autobiography, Eric Clapton writes "'Got to Hurry' which was based on a tune hummed by Giorgio [Gomelsky], who gave himself the writing credit under the pseudonym O. Rasputin." Clapton biographer Marc Roberty calls it "the first song Clapton ever wrote, although credited to Gomelsky". Cub Koda and Gregg Russo describe it as "cobbled together out of a group jam".)	Clapton, 6 August 1964	2:34
6.	"I Ain't Done Wrong"	Keith Relf	Beck, 15 March 1965	3:37

Side 2
No.	Title	Writer(s)	Lead guitar/ recording date(s)	Length
1.	"I Wish You Would"	Billy Boy Arnold	Clapton, March 1964	2:18
2.	"A Certain Girl"	Naomi Neville a.k.a. Allen Toussaint	Clapton, March 1964	2:16
3.	"Sweet Music" (stereo, take 3)	Major Lance, Otis Leavill Cobb, Walter Bowie	Uncertain, November 1964	2:29
4.	"Good Morning Little Schoolgirl"	H.G. Demarais (Note: H.G. Demarais (or Dee Marais), a Shreveport, Louisiana record label owner/distributor, was credited on the original LP. Roberty lists the songwriters as Don Level and Bob Love, who first recorded the song in 1961 as the R&B duo Don and Bob. Some reissues list Sonny Boy Williamson, who recorded a different "Good Morning, School Girl" in 1937.)	Clapton, August-September 1964	2:52
5.	"My Girl Sloopy"	Bert Russell, Wes Farrell	Beck, 13 April 1965	5:36

=== Album reissues ===
The Yardbirds' 2001 compilation album Ultimate! contains eight of the eleven tracks from the original album. For Your Love has been reissued by several record labels, including JVC, Castle, and Repertoire. In addition to the eleven tracks from the original album, the Repertoire reissue includes 13 non-album single and demo tracks.

Repertoire reissue additional material
No.	Title	Writer(s)	Length
12.	"Baby, What's Wrong" (demo)	Sonny Boy Williamson II	2:38
13.	"Boom Boom" (A-side of German/Dutch "Honey in Your Hips")	John Lee Hooker	2:25
14.	"Honey in Your Hips" (B-side of "Boom Boom")	Relf	2:19
15.	"Talkin' About You" (demo)	Chuck Berry	1:56
16.	"I Wish You Would" (demo)	Arnold	4:17
17.	"A Certain Girl" (demo)	Neville	2:21
18.	"Got to Hurry" (demo, take 4)	Gomelsky	2:35
19.	"Sweet Music" (demo, take 4)	Lance	2:28
20.	"Heart Full of Soul" (demo, sitar version)	Gouldman	1:54
21.	"Steeled Blues" (B-side of "Heart Full of Soul")	Jeff Beck	2:38
22.	"Paff...Bum" (shorter version, B-side of German "Shapes of Things")	Sergio Bardotti, Gianfranco Reverberi, Paul Samwell-Smith	2:27
23.	"Questa Volta" (A-side of Italian "Paff...Bum")	Mogol Audio 2, Johnny Dinamo, Roberto Satti	2:33
24.	"Paff...Bum" (longer version, B-side of "Questa Volta")	Bardotti, Reverberi, Samwell-Smith	2:36

== Personnel ==
The Yardbirds

- Keith Relf – lead vocals, harmonica, acoustic guitar on "Heart Full of Soul"
- Eric Clapton – lead guitar on all tracks, except those with Beck and "Questa Volta" (Note: On "Sweet Music", it is not clear if Clapton plays guitar.)
- Jeff Beck – lead guitar on "I'm Not Talking", "I Ain't Done Wrong", "My Girl Sloopy", "Steeled Blues" and "Paff...Bum"
- Chris Dreja – rhythm guitar, lead guitar on "Questa Volta"
- Paul Samwell-Smith – bass guitar, backing vocals, musical director
- Jim McCarty – drums, backing vocals

Additional musicians

- Giorgio Gomelsky – backing vocals on "A Certain Girl"
- Brian Auger – harpsichord on "For Your Love"
- Denny Pierce – bongos on "For Your Love"
- Ron Prentice – bowed bass on "For Your Love", bass on "Heart Full of Soul"
- Manfred Mann – keyboard and backing vocals on "Sweet Music"
- Paul Jones – backing vocals on "Sweet Music"
- Mike Hugg – vibes on "Sweet Music"
- Tom McGuinness – guitar on "Sweet Music"
- Mike Vickers – guitar on "Sweet Music"
- unidentified – sitar on "Heart Full of Soul"
- unidentified – tabla on "Heart Full of Soul"
- unidentified – keyboards on "Paff...Bum" and "Questa Volta"

== Sources ==
- Clapton, Eric (2007). Clapton: The Autobiography. New York City: Broadway Books. ISBN 978-0-7679-2536-5.
- Clayson, Alan (2002). The Yardbirds. San Francisco: Backbeat Books. ISBN 0-87930-724-2.
- Gomelsky, Giorgio; Cohen, Phil (2002). The Yardbirds Story (Boxed set booklet). The Yardbirds. United Kingdom: Charly Records. OCLC 62367983. SNAD 905 CD.
- Koda, Cub; Russo, Gregg (2001). Ultimate! (Boxed set booklet). The Yardbirds. Los Angeles: Rhino Records. OCLC 781357622. R2 79825.
- Roberty, Mark (1993). Slowhand: The Complete Life and Times of Eric Clapton. New York City: Crown Trade Paperbacks. ISBN 0-517-88118-7.
- Russo, Greg (2016). Yardbirds: The Ultimate Rave-Up (6th. ed.). Crossfire Publications. ISBN 978-0-9791845-7-4.
