= White Summer =

Instrumental recorded by Jimmy Page with the Yardbirds

Instrumental by the Yardbirds

from the album Little Games
- Released: 24 July 1967
- Recorded: 28–29 April 1967
- Studio: De Lane Lea, London
- Genre: Raga rock; instrumental rock
- Length: 3:56
- Label: Epic
- Composer: Jimmy Page
- Producer: Mickie Most

"White Summer" is a guitar instrumental by English rock guitarist Jimmy Page. It is an adaptation of the Irish air "She Moves Through The Fair". Page initially recorded and performed it with the Yardbirds and later included it in many Led Zeppelin concerts.

According to biographer Keith Shadwick, it is based on an old Irish folk song, "specifically derived from 'She Moved Through the Fair' in the 1963 version by [Davey] Graham, which he in turn credited to Padraic Colum". The later Led Zeppelin song "Over the Hills and Far Away" was "spun off" from "White Summer" as well as an unreleased 20-minute instrumental recorded in early 1974 at Headley Grange.

== Yardbirds song ==
"White Summer" was recorded 28–29 April 1967 at De Lane Lea Studios in London. Jimmy Page was the only band member to perform on the recording and was accompanied by Chris Karan on tabla and an unidentified oboe player doubling the melody line. The song combines elements of traditional Eastern as well as Western music. In a 1977 interview, Page commented, "I used a special tuning for [the song]; the low string down to D, then A, D, G, A and D. It’s like a modal tuning, a sitar tuning, in fact". He added that he called this tuning "'C.I.A.' tuning—Celtic-Indian-Arabic—because that's what it was ... D–A–D–G–A–D was something going around the folk scene during the 1960s" and was used by Davey Graham for his "She Moved Through the Fair".

"White Summer" was released on the Yardbirds' last album, Little Games. An alternate take/mix without the accompaniment was included on the 1992 Yardbirds compilation Cumular Limit. It was a staple of live Yardbird performances with Jim McCarty usually providing a drum part and appears on the albums Live Yardbirds: Featuring Jimmy Page and Glimpses 1963–1968. When playing the song live with the Yardbirds, Page used a 1961 Danelectro 3021 guitar.

== Led Zeppelin renditions ==
"White Summer/Black Mountain Side"

Instrumental by Led Zeppelin

from the album Led Zeppelin Boxed Set
- Released: 7 September 1990
- Recorded: 27 June 1969
- Venue: Playhouse Theatre, London
- Genre: Raga rock, instrumental rock
- Length: 8:01
- Label: Atlantic
- Composer: Jimmy Page
- Producer: Jeff Griffin

Led Zeppelin frequently performed "White Summer" as part of a medley with "Black Mountain Side" during their 1968–70 tours and again on the 1977 US, 1979 and 1980 Europe tours. A live performance during the band's U.K. Tour of Summer 1969 was recorded by the BBC at the Playhouse Theatre in London on 27 June 1969 for the pilot of Radio One's In Concert series. This recording was produced by Jeff Griffin and released in 1990 on the Led Zeppelin Boxed Set with the combined title "White Summer/Black Mountain Side". The piece was later included in the expanded 1993 reissue of Coda from The Complete Studio Recordings and Led Zeppelin Definitive Collection (2008) box sets.

Page used his Danelectro to play the medley, as shown on 2003's Led Zeppelin DVD, which was filmed at the Royal Albert Hall on 9 January 1970. On 23 April 1970, Page performed the piece on the Julie Felix Show. Page also played it when he was with the Firm and again during his Outrider tour, segueing into "White Summer/Black Mountain Side" as part of the solo section of "Midnight Moonlight".
