= When Giants Walked the Earth =

2008 book by Mick Wall

When Giants Walked the Earth: A Biography of Led Zeppelin
- Author: Mick Wall
- Language: English
- Subject: Biography
- Publisher: Orion
- Publication date: October 2008
- Media type: Print (Paperback)
- Pages: 520 pp
- ISBN: 0-7528-7547-7
- OCLC: 233788361

When Giants Walked the Earth: A Biography of Led Zeppelin is a book written by Mick Wall, published in 2008. It is a biography of the English rock band Led Zeppelin.

The book tells the life stories of the band's members. The narrative of Led Zeppelin is told through a mixture of prose and interview excerpts. It was based partly on interviews which were conducted by Wall with all the surviving members of the band.

== Criticisms ==
Following the release of this publication, Led Zeppelin guitarist Jimmy Page, reportedly threatened to sue its author over the book's contents. According to Page:

Wall’s just writing a book designed to cash in on something he didn’t have anything to do with. He wasn’t a creative force in Led Zep. I’m at something of a disadvantage because I haven’t chosen to read that book, but I hear it’s totally distorted from people who do know about Led Zeppelin.
