= Over Under Sideways Down =

- US single picture sleeve

Single by the Yardbirds

from the album Roger the Engineer
- B-side: "Jeff's Boogie"
- Released: 27 May 1966 (UK); 8 June 1966 (US)
- Recorded: 19–20 April 1966
- Studio: Advision, London
- Genre: Psychedelic rock; blues rock
- Length: 2:37
- Label: Columbia (UK); Epic (US)
- Songwriters: Chris Dreja; Jim McCarty; Jeff Beck; Keith Relf; Paul Samwell-Smith
- Producer: Simon Napier-Bell

The Yardbirds singles chronology
"Shapes of Things" (1966)	"Over Under Sideways Down" (1966)	"Happenings Ten Years Time Ago" (1966)

"Over Under Sideways Down" is a 1966 song by English rock group the Yardbirds. A composition credited to all members of the group, it combines elements of blues rock and psychedelic rock. It was first released as a single in May 1966 as a follow-up to "Shapes of Things" and in July was included on group's self-titled UK album (commonly known as Roger the Engineer and Over Under Sideways Down in the US and elsewhere).

== Composition and recording ==
According to Yardbirds drummer Jim McCarty, the basic outline for "Over Under Sideways Down" was inspired by Bill Haley and His Comets' "Rock Around the Clock". The group had heard Haley's song on the radio after a gig and considered adapting it in their own style. At a later recording session, guitarist Jeff Beck started by playing the song's bassline and the group were soon working out an arrangement. Beck then switched to lead guitar and came up with the intro. McCarty recalled:

We needed an intro, and Jeff peeled one out, an instantly recognisable peel that completely took us by surprise ... Over and over we listened back to that line, going back and forth over whether it belonged in the song. And then like a flash of lightning, we realised that it did. More than that, it made the song.

Although McCarty felt that all of the group contributed to the lyrics, producer Simon Napier-Bell attributed them to singer Keith Relf. He also claims that Relf's original verse "Over under sideways down, That's the best way I have found" was changed to "Over under sideways down, Backwards forwards square and round", because BBC censors might have objected to the vaguely suggestive line.

== Releases and charts ==
Columbia issued "Over Under Sideways Down" in the UK as a single on 27 May 1966, with Epic in the US following on 13 June. The B-side, the instrumental "Jeff's Boogie", is credited to Beck; however, it has been described as "a near copy of Chuck Berry's 'Guitar Boogie'". The single became the Yardbirds' fifth single to reach the UK top 10 chart, where it peaked at number 10. In Canada it reached number 5. In the US and on the New Zealand Listener charts, it reached number 13.

In July 1966, the song was released on Yardbirds, the group's first studio album in the UK and in August on the US edition titled after the song. As one of the group's most popular pieces, "Over Under Sideways Down" it is included on many anthologies, such as The Yardbirds Greatest Hits (1967) and Ultimate! (2001). A live performance with Beck's replacement, Jimmy Page, recorded in New York City in 1968, is included on the Page-produced Yardbirds '68 (2017).

== Recognition ==
Rolling Stone magazine ranked "Over Under Sideways Down" at number 23 on its list of the 100 Greatest Guitar Songs of All Time.

== Bibliography ==
- DeRogatis, Jim (2003). Turn on Your Mind: Four Decades of Great Psychedelic Rock. Hal Leonard. ISBN 978-0-634-05548-5.
- French, David (2020). Heart Full of Soul: Keith Relf of the Yardbirds. Jefferson, North Carolina: McFarland & Company. ISBN 978-1-4766-8011-8.
- McCarty, Jim (2018). Nobody Told Me: My Life with the Yardbirds, Renaissance and Other Stories. Lulu.com. ISBN 978-0244966508.
- Koda, Cub; Russo, Gregg (2001). Ultimate! (Boxed set booklet). The Yardbirds. Los Angeles: Rhino Records. OCLC 781357622. R2 79825.
- Russo, Greg (2016). Yardbirds: The Ultimate Rave-Up. Floral Park, New York: Crossfire Publications. ISBN 978-0-9791845-7-4.
