= Glimpses 1963–1968 =

Compilation album by the Yardbirds
- Released: 5 December 2011
- Recorded: 1964–1968
- Genre: Rock
- Length: 385:05
- Label: Easy Action
- Compiler: Greg Russo

Glimpses 1963–1968 is a 5-CD compilation boxed set by English rock group the Yardbirds. It contains various live and demo recordings interspersed with interviews with group members. Released on 5 December 2011 by Easy Action Recordings, the album was compiled by group biographer Greg Russo with the Yardbirds' approval.

== Critical reception ==
Stephen Thomas Erlewine, in a review for AllMusic, gave the album four out of five stars and wrote:

Easy Action's Glimpses is truly the first attempt to do a successful comprehensive roundup of rarities, packaging a variety of alternate takes, live cuts, commercials, and BBC Sessions in a handsome box. Much of this is officially unreleased, some of it is unheard ... this is as definitive a collection of rarities that could possibly exist, presented in the best audio possible (and some of this is indeed pretty rough, drowning in hiss and crackles), and presented as a thorough narrative of the band’s career, complete with interview clips.

In a review for Record Collector magazine, Kris Needs noted, "This lovingly-compiled, feverishly hyperactive set might include five different versions of some songs, but it’s fascinating to hear the band’s rampant evolution as musical trends catch up with them and they strive for the next phase."

== Track listing ==
=== Disc one (1963–1964) ===
1. "Honey In Your Hips" (Alternate Studio Take) 2:24
2. "Baby What's Wrong" 2:41
3. "Eric Clapton-Interview" 0:43
4. "I Wish You Would" 3:32
5. "You Can't Judge a Book by the Cover" (Studio Demo) 2:41
6. "Jim McCarty-Interview" 0:26
7. "Louise" 2:54
8. "Eric Clapton-Interview" 0:23
9. "Someone To Love" 2:15
10. "Too Much Monkey Business" 3:07
11. "I Got Love If You Want It" 4:16
12. "Smokestack Lightning" 5:52
13. "Good Morning Little Schoolgirl" 3:37
14. "Respectable" 5:30
15. "The Sky Is Crying" 6:40
16. "Eric Clapton-Interview" 0:40
17. "I Wish You Would" 2:52
18. "Chris Dreja-Interview" 0:22
19. "I'm a Man" 3:26
20. "Someone To Love" 1:56
21. "Boom Boom" 3:36
22. "I'm a Man" 3:12
23. "Little Queenie" 3:27
24. "Too Much Monkey Monkey Business" 2:53
25. "Respectable" 3:46
26. "Carol" 2:33
27. "Here 'Tis" 3:44
28. "Jim McCarty-Interview" 0:26

=== Disc two (1965) ===
1. "Evil Hearted You" Keith Relf-Introduction (Sept 27) 2:26
2. "Keith Relf-Interview" 0:25
3. "Heart Full Of Soul" Paul Samwell-Smith-Interview (June 1) 3:15
4. "Chris Dreja-Interview" 0:38
5. "I Ain't Done Wrong" (July 3) 2:27
6. "Jim McCarty-Interview" 0:36
7. "Smokestack Lightning" (Full Version) (Nov 16) 4:56
8. "You're a Better Man Than I" Interview (Nov 16) 3:56
9. "The Train Kept A-Rollin'" (Nov 16) 2:39
10. "Jim McCarty-Interview" 0:44
11. "I'm Not Talking" (March 16) 2:33
12. "Keith Relf-Interview" 0:15
13. "I'm A Man" (April 9) 3:55
14. "Keith Relf-Interview" 0:25
15. "Jeff's Boogie" (June 9) 2:31
16. "Keith Relf-Interview" 0:46
17. "Steeled Blues" (June 1) 2:36
18. "Louise" (June 4) 2:56
19. "Keith Relf-Interview" 0:21
20. "I Wish You Would" (Aug 6) 2:31
21. "Love Me Like I Love You" (Aug 9) 2:46
22. "The Stumble" (Sept 27) 1:53
23. "Paul Samwell-Smith-Interview" 1:26
24. "You're Better Man Than I" 2:23
25. "The Train Kept A-Rollin'" 2:41
26. "Chris Dreja-Interview" 0:41
27. "I've Been Trying" (9 June) 3:02
28. "Shapes Of Things-Interview" 5:02
29. "Paul Samwell-Smith-Interview" 2:40
30. "For Your Love" (Long Version) 2:07
31. "My Girl Sloopy" (Long Version) 5:49
32. "I'm A Man (Live)" 3:35
33. "I Wish You Would" (Live) 1:02
34. "McLeans" Advert 0:30

=== Disc three (1965–1966) ===
1. "Happenings Ten Years Time Ago" 2:55
2. "Keith Relf-Interview" 0:39
3. "Psycho Daisies" 1:48
4. "Stroll On" (With Soundtrack Coda) 3:31
5. "Chris Dreja-Interview" 0:11
6. "Great Shakes" Advert 1:02
7. "I Wish You Would" 3:18
8. "I'm A Man" 2:37
9. "The Train Kept A-Rollin'" (Live) 2:21
10. "Over Under Sideways Down" (Live) 2:13
11. "Shapes Of Things" (Live) 2:21
12. "He's Always There" (Alternate Version) 2:29
13. "Turn Into Earth" (Alternate Version) 3:09
14. "I Can't Make Your Way" (Alternate Version) 2:23
15. "I'm A Man" 3:12
16. "For Your Love" 2:12
17. "Heart Full Of Soul" 2:23
18. "I Wish You Would" (Live) 2:27
19. "Jim McCarty-Interview" 0:12
20. "Questa Volta" (Live) 4:05
21. "Pafff... Bum" (Live) 2:52
22. "Chris Dreja-Interview" 0:19
23. "The Train Kept A-Rollin'" (Live) 2:30
24. "Shapes Of Things" (Live) 2:15
25. "Jim McCarty-Interview" 0:15
26. "Jimmy Page-Interview" 1:09
27. "Jeff's Boogie" (May 6, 1966) 2:15
28. "You're Better Man Than I" (Live) 3:07
29. "Keith Relf & Jeff Beck Interview Ravi Shankar" (June 8, 1966) 0:56
30. "Shapes Of Things" (Live) 2:18
31. "Jim McCarty-Interview" 0:30
32. "Jim McCarty-Interview" 0:27
33. "Chris Dreja-Interview" 0:17
34. "I'm Not Talking" (June 4, 1965) 2:26
35. "Heart Full Of Soul" (June 9, 1965) 2:22
36. "Spoonful" (9 April '65) 3:10
37. "Bottle Up And Go" (9 April '65) 1:57
38. "All The Pretty Little Horses (Hushabye)" (April 9, 1965) 1:56
39. "Jeff Beck-Interview" 0:08

=== Disc four (1967–1968) ===
1. "Shapes Of Things" 2:55
2. "Happenings Ten Years Time Ago" 4:25
3. "Over Under Sideways Down" 2:14
4. "I'm A Man" 6:24
5. "Chris Dreja-Interview" 0:39
6. "Shapes Of Things" 2:31
7. "Heart Full Of Soul" 2:16
8. "You're Better Man Than I" 3:52
9. "Most Likely You Go Your Way (And I'll Go Mine)" 3:15
10. "Over Under Sideways Down" 2:32
11. "Little Games" 2:40
12. "My Baby" 2:43
13. "I'm A Man" 7:07
14. "Chris Dreja-Interview" 0:49
15. "The Train Kept A-Rollin'" 3:18
16. "Dazed And Confused" 5:46
17. "Goodnight Sweet Josephine" 2:33
18. "Glimpses (Sound Effects)" 1:22
19. "The In Sound" 1:36
20. "Chris Dreja-Interview" 0:37
21. "Think About It" (Work-In-Progress) 5:33
22. "Jimmy Page-Interview" 0:22
23. "Dazed And Confused" (Live) 9:09

=== Disc five (BBC Radio One) ===
1. "I Ain't Got You" (March 22, 1965) 2:00
2. "For Your Love - Keith Relf-Interview" (March 22, 1965) 3:17
3. "I'm Not Talking" (March 22, 1965) 1:46
4. "I Wish You Would" (June 1, 1965) 2:36
5. "Too Much Monkey Business" (August 6, 1965) 2:29
6. "Love Me Like I Love You" (August 6, 1965) 2:50
7. "I'm A Man" (August 6, 1965) 2:27
8. "Still I'm Sad - Paul Samwell-Smith-Interview" (27 September 27, 1965) 3:44
9. "My Girl Sloopy" (Full Version) (September 27, 1965) 3:40
10. "Keith Relf Interview" (February 28,' 1966) 1:19
11. "Shapes Of Things" (February 28, 1966) 2:17
12. "You're A Better Man Than I" (February 28, 1966) 3:03
13. "Dust My Broom" (February 28, 1966) 2:30
14. "Baby, Scratch My Back - Keith Relf-Interview" (May 6, 1966) 4:01
15. "Over Under Sideways Down" (May 6, 1966) 2:11
16. "The Sun Is Shining" (Full Version) (May 6, 1966) 3:32
17. "Shapes Of Things"(6 May '66) 2:24
18. "Most Likely You Go Your Way (And I'll Go Mine)" (March 17, 1967)
19. "Little Games" (March 17, 1967) 2:21
20. "Drinking Muddy Water" (March 17, 1967) 2:40
21. "Think About It" (March 16, 1968) 3:09
22. "Jimmy Page-Interview-Goodnight Sweet Josephine" (16 March '68) 4:19
23. "My Baby (March 16, 1967) 2:50
24. "White Summer" (March 5–6, 1968) 4:24
25. "Dazed And Confused" (March 5–6, 1968) 5:47
26. "Think About It" (March 5–6, 1968) 3:15
