= Live Yardbirds: Featuring Jimmy Page =

Live album by the Yardbirds
- Released: September 1971
- Recorded: 30 March 1968
- Venue: Anderson Theatre, New York City
- Genre: Rock
- Length: 44:48
- Label: Epic

The Yardbirds' Epic chronology
Featuring Performances By: Jeff Beck Eric Clapton Jimmy Page (1970)	Live Yardbirds: Featuring Jimmy Page (1971)	Yardbirds Favorites (1977)

Live Yardbirds: Featuring Jimmy Page is a live album by English rock group the Yardbirds. It was recorded at the Anderson Theatre in New York City on 30 March 1968. At the time, the Yardbirds had been performing as a quartet with Jimmy Page on lead guitar since October 1966.

The album includes several familiar Yardbird songs, but often extended with longer instrumental solos. "I'm Confused," based on Jake Holmes' "Dazed and Confused", is a highlight of the album. Using some different lyrics, Page re-recorded it with Led Zeppelin for their debut album later in 1968.

The group was dissatisfied with the recordings and objected to their release, but after Page became famous with Led Zeppelin, Epic Records issued the album in September 1971. Page took legal action and Epic was enjoined from further distribution of the album. Over the years, there were several more attempts to release the album. In 2017, Page discovered the concert tapes in his personal archive and remixed the recordings. An album with the Anderson concert and demo recordings from the same time, were released in November 2017 on Yardbirds '68.

== Recording and releases ==
Although a live album, Epic Records overdubbed crowd noises from bullfights and other sound effects onto the original tracks against the band's wishes, in part because the live recordings were considered lacking in sound quality. This was a result of the general inexperience of the engineers in recording live rock music. For example, only a single microphone was deployed for the drums, hung above the kit. This resulted in the loss of much of the lower-range percussion in the recording.

The Yardbirds rejected the album as a candidate for release upon its original completion in mid-1968, but Epic released it in 1971 in response to Led Zeppelin's success in the marketplace. Page took legal action against the label for releasing Live Yardbirds without authorization and Epic quickly withdrew it. Epic parent CBS' Columbia Special Products (CSP) label reissued the album in 1976, but this was, again, legally challenged by Page, and the album was, again, quickly withdrawn.

Authentic Epic and CSP copies of Live Yardbirds are thus quite rare, and the album has often been counterfeited (sometimes in black-and-white covers claimed to be promotional copies) as a result. The album's cover art was designed by James Grashow, a woodcut artist who had earlier created the artwork for Jethro Tull's 1969 album Stand Up.

== Yardbirds '68 ==
Although the master tapes for this concert were presumed to be destroyed or otherwise unavailable, they were located and remixed by Page. Together with several demo recordings from the same period, they were released in November 2017 as Yardbirds '68.

== Critical reception ==
Professional ratings
Review scores
Source	Rating
AllMusic	4.5/5 stars

In a retrospective review for AllMusic, Bruce Eder gave the album four and a half out of five stars and notes the dominant role of Page's guitar playing. Although Eder feels "The performance also reveals just how far out in front of the psychedelic pack the Yardbirds were by the spring of 1968", he adds:

Ironically, this album isn't quite as strong as the contemporary Truth album by Jeff Beck, mostly because the Yardbirds were still juggling three sounds: the group's progressive pop/rock past, the psychedelia of 1968, and a harder, more advanced blues-based sound.

== Track listing ==
Songwriters and track running times are taken from the original Epic LP. Other releases may have different listings.

Side one
No.	Title	Writer(s)	Length
1.	"The Train Kept A-Rollin'"	Tiny Bradshaw, Lois Mann, Howard Kay	3:10
2.	"You're a Better Man Than I"	Mike Hugg, Brian Hugg	6:50
3.	"I'm Confused"	Unlisted	6:47
4.	"My Baby"	Mort Shuman, Jerry Ragavoy	5:01

Side two
No.	Title	Writer(s)	Length
1.	"Over Under Sideways Down"	Chris Dreja,Keith Relf, Paul Samwell-Smith, Jim McCarty, Jeff Beck	2:39
2.	"Drinking Muddy Water"	Relf, Jimmy Page, McCarty, Dreja	3:16
3.	"Shapes of Things"	Samwell-Smith, Relf, McCarty	2:48
4.	"White Summer"	Page	4:19
5.	"I'm a Man"	Ellas McDaniel a.k.a. Bo Diddley	11:59

== Personnel ==
The Yardbirds

- Keith Relf – harmonica, lead vocals
- Jimmy Page – guitar
- Chris Dreja – bass guitar
- Jim McCarty – drums, backing vocals

Production

- Don Meehan – engineer
- Buddy Graham – engineer
- Lenny Kaye – liner notes
- James Grashow – cover artist
