= I'm a Man (Bo Diddley song) =

Blues standard

Single by Bo Diddley
- A-side: "Bo Diddley"
- Released: April 1955
- Recorded: Chicago, March 2, 1955
- Genre: Rhythm and blues; Chicago blues
- Length: 2:05
- Label: Checker
- Songwriter: Ellas McDaniel a.k.a. Bo Diddley
- Producers: Leonard Chess; Phil Chess; Bo Diddley

"I'm a Man" is a rhythm and blues song written and recorded by Bo Diddley in 1955. Inspired by an earlier blues song, it was one of his first hits. "I'm a Man" has been recorded by a variety of artists, including the Yardbirds, who adapted it in an upbeat rock style.

== Bo Diddley song ==
"I'm a Man" was one of the first songs Bo Diddley recorded for Checker Records. Unlike his self-titled "Bo Diddley" that was recorded the same day (March 2, 1955, in Chicago), "I'm a Man" does not use the Bo Diddley beat. Rather, it was inspired by Muddy Waters' 1954 song "Hoochie Coochie Man", written by Willie Dixon. After the release of "I'm a Man", Waters recorded an "answer song" in May 1955, titled "Mannish Boy", referring to Diddley's younger age.

In a Rolling Stone magazine interview, Diddley recounts that the song took a long time to record because of confusion regarding the timing of the "M ... A ... N" vocal chorus. There are conflicting accounts regarding the instrumental backing musicians for the song. Reissues of Diddley's first album, Bo Diddley, list them as Diddley on vocals and guitar, Frank Kirkland on drums, Jerome Green on maracas, Lester Davenport on harmonica, and either Otis Spann or Henry Gray on piano. However, the song has also been identified as Chicago harmonica player Billy Boy Arnold's first contribution to a Checker recording. Arnold later played harmonica on several Bo Diddley songs.

"I'm a Man" was released as the B-side of Bo Diddley's first single in April 1955. The single became a two-sided hit and reached number one on the Billboard R&B chart. The song is included on several of his compilation albums, including Bo Diddley (1958) and His Best (1997). He also recorded it with Muddy Waters and Little Walter for the 1967 Super Blues album.

The single was released in Canada on Reo 8022 in 1955.

== The Yardbirds versions ==
"I'm a Man"
- German picture sleeve

Single by the Yardbirds

from the album Having a Rave Up with The Yardbirds
- B-side: "Still I'm Sad"
- Released: October 11, 1965
- Recorded: September 19, 21–22, 1965
- Studio: Chess, Chicago; Columbia, New York City
- Genre: Blues rock
- Length: 5:58
- Label: Epic
- Songwriter: Ellas McDaniel a.k.a. Bo Diddley
- Producer: Giorgio Gomelsky

The Yardbirds U.S. singles chronology
"Heart Full of Soul" (1965)	"I'm a Man" (1965)	"Shapes of Things" (1966)

The English rock band the Yardbirds recorded a live version of "I'm a Man" for their first UK album Five Live Yardbirds with Eric Clapton in 1964, that was later included on their second American album Having a Rave Up with The Yardbirds. In 1965 during their first American tour, the Yardbirds with Jeff Beck on guitar, recorded a studio version of "I'm a Man", that is also included on Having a Rave Up. Their versions feature their signature "rave-up" arrangement, when the beat shifts into double time and the instrumentation builds to a climax. Beck added a "scratch-picking" technique to produce a percussive effect during the song's instrumental section, which critic Cub Koda notes "provides the climax on the studio version of 'I'm a Man', perhaps the most famous Yardbirds rave-up of all".

The Yardbirds recorded the backing track at Chess Studios in Chicago on September 19, 1965. They overdubbed further elements on the 21st and 22nd at Columbia Studios in New York. On October 11, Epic Records released "I'm a Man" as a single in the US, with "Still I'm Sad" as the B-side. It peaked at number 17 on the Billboard Hot 100. In Canada, the single was released by Capitol and reached number 4 on the RPM singles chart. The song was included on their 1965 Epic Records album Having a Rave Up and was later released in the UK in 1976. Diddley praised their cover as "beautiful" and it has been called "a defining moment for the band".

In addition to the 1964 live version with Clapton, other live versions include those with Jeff Beck (1965 Yardbirds ...On Air, released 1991) and Jimmy Page (1968 Live Yardbirds: Featuring Jimmy Page, released 1971 and Yardbirds '68, released 2017).

== Recognition ==
Bo Diddley's original "I'm a Man" is ranked number 369 on Rolling Stone magazine's list of "The 500 Greatest Songs of All Time". In 2012, the song along with the self-named A-side song "Bo Diddley" was added to the Library of Congress's National Recording Registry list of "culturally, historically, or aesthetically important" American sound recordings. In 2018, "I'm a Man" was inducted into the Blues Foundation Blues Hall of Fame as a "Classic of Blues Recording". In 2020, the 1955 recording of "I'm a Man" by Bo Diddley on Checker Records was inducted into the Grammy Hall of Fame.
