= For Your Love =

1965 song by the Yardbirds

- Italian picture sleeve

Single by the Yardbirds

from the album For Your Love
- B-side: "Got to Hurry"
- Released: 5 March 1965 (UK); 9 April 1965 (US)
- Recorded: 1 February 1965
- Studio: IBC, London
- Genre: Pop; baroque pop; pop rock
- Length: 2:38
- Label: Columbia (UK); Epic (US)
- Songwriter: Graham Gouldman
- Producer: Giorgio Gomelsky

The Yardbirds UK singles chronology
"Good Morning Little Schoolgirl" (1964)	"For Your Love" (1965)	"Heart Full of Soul" (1965)

The Yardbirds US singles chronology
"I Wish You Would" (1964)	"For Your Love" (1965)	"Heart Full of Soul" (1965)

"For Your Love" is a rock song written by Graham Gouldman and recorded by the English group the Yardbirds. Released in March 1965, it was their first top ten hit in the UK, Canada, and the US. The song was a departure from the group's blues roots in favour of a more commercial pop rock sound. Guitarist Eric Clapton disapproved of this change, and chose to leave the group shortly after the single was released. That same year, the song was also included on the self-titled album of Herman's Hermits.

== Background ==
Gouldman wrote the song at the age of 18 while working by day in a gentlemen's outfitters near Salford Docks and playing by night with the semi-professional Manchester band the Mockingbirds. Gouldman cited the Beatles as his influence:

We went down to Denmark Street and went round all the publishers trying to find a song ... we didn't get any songs that we liked or we weren't given any songs period and the Beatles had started and I thought 'well, I’m gonna really have a crack at song-writing.' I had dabbled a bit, but they were really my inspiration and gave me and I think a lot of other people the courage to actually do it. We all wanted to be like the Beatles. I wrote two songs and the record company we were with turned down one of the songs. The song they turned down was 'For Your Love', which eventually found its way to the Yardbirds.

The Yardbirds were performing on a Christmas show at the Hammersmith Odeon in London and song publisher Ronnie Beck played the song to their manager, Giorgio Gomelsky, and the band.

== Recording ==
The Yardbirds recorded "For Your Love" at the IBC Studios in London on 1 February 1965. The majority of the song was recorded with singer Keith Relf and drummer Jim McCarty backed by session musician Ron Prentice on bowed bass, Denny Piercy on bongos, and Brian Auger on harpsichord. Guitarists Eric Clapton and Chris Dreja perform only during the song's middle break section. Bassist Paul Samwell-Smith assumed the production duties and is listed as musical director on the 45. Samwell-Smith was inspired to use a harpsichord based on the Eartha Kitt song, "Just An Old Fashioned Girl". At the conclusion of the session, Auger wondered, "Who, in their right mind, is going to buy a pop single with harpsichord on it?"

== Releases and charts ==
Shortly after the single was released by Columbia on 5 March 1965, it became a hit in the UK. When it was released a month later by Epic Records in the US, it became the group's first charting single. By then, Clapton had already left the group for various reasons, including their more commercial aspirations.

Chart (1965)	Peak position
Canada (RPM)	1
Ireland (IRMA)	10
Italy (Musica e dischi)	14
Sweden (Kvällstoppen)	13
Sweden (Tio i Topp)	5
UK (NME)	1
UK (Record Retailer)	3
US (Billboard Hot 100)	6
US (Cashbox Top 100)	6
US (Record World 100 Top Pops)	4

== Fleetwood Mac version ==
Fleetwood Mac issued "For Your Love" as a single in 1973. Cash Box called this version "a totally contemporary, yet still hard rocking treatment from this great British band of rockers" that maintains the essence of the original tune.
