= Trademark of Quality discography =

Trademark of Quality (abbreviated TMOQ or TMQ) was a bootleg record label based in Los Angeles, California, and was established in 1970 by "Dub" Taylor and Ken Douglas. In the summer of 1969, they released Bob Dylan's "GWW" Great White Wonder with a white fold-out cover and white labels. Another 9 titles followed before they 1970 created the "farm pig" logo and the TMQ label was fact then they began fastening round fluorescent stickers on the outside of their rubber-stamped jackets which read 'Trade Mark Of Quality,' and bore the profile of a farm pig. The Frank Zappa - 200 Motels release was the first to bear such a sticker. Over time, custom pig labels were added along with xerox insert covers.

In late 1971 the two split up the partnership and started a "friendly competition". In the beginning, Ken's releases were ( nearly ) exact copies of Dub's. They were made with the same stamping plates, similar labels, stickers, and inserts. In 1973, Dub went to deluxe covers to differentiate between his and Ken's records. Ken, at the time, had no way to duplicate the deluxe covers. Also during 1973, Ken began using the smoking pig logo on his labels instead of the farm pig. Dub went until 1974 and briefly returned in 1976 and 1977 with a small series of deluxe-covered titles before dropping out entirely.

Ken continued with his "Smoking pig" label until 1976. This article lists the records released by the label and is divided into two sections.

TMOQ (I) = Dub&Ken era (II) = Ken "smoking pig" era

TMOQ (I) single LPs :

- 71001 – Bob Dylan – Stealin'
- 71002 – Bob Dylan – John Birch Society Blues
- 71003 – Rolling Stones – Live'r Than You'll Ever Be
- 71004 – Donovan – The Ready River
- 71005 – Jethro Tull – My God
- 71006 – Bob Dylan – While the Establishment Burns
- 71007 – The Beatles – In Atlanta Whiskey Flat
- 71008 – Bob Dylan – Seems Like A Freeze Out
- 71009 – Bob Dylan – Talkin Bear Mountain Massacre Picnic Blues
- 71010 – Frank Zappa / Mothers – 200 Motels
- 71011 – Jefferson Airplane – Up Against The wall
- 71012 – The Beatles – Last Live Show
- 71013 – CSN&Y – Ohio Wooden Nickel
- 71014 – Paul Simon – The Paul Simon Solo Album
- 71015 – The Beatles – Complete Christmas Collection 1963 – 69
- 71016 – Rod Stewart & the Faces – Plynth
- 71017 – Bob Dylan – Royal Albert Hall
- 71018 – Jimi Hendrix – Maui Hawaii
- 71019 – Jimi Hendrix – Broadcasts
- 71020 – Rolling Stones – European Tour 1970
- 71021 – Rolling Stones – Beautiful Delilah
- 71022 – Neil Young – At The Los Angeles Music centre
- 71023 – Janis Joplin – Infinity Blues
- 71024 – The Beatles – Get Back Sessions
- 71025 – The Beatles – Renaissance Minstrels 1
- 71026 – The Beatles – Renaissance Minstrels 2
- 71027 – Bob Dylan – VD Waltz
- 71028 – Jimi Hendrix – Smashing Amps
- 71029 – Rolling Stones – London Roundhouse
- 71030 – Jethro Tull – Nothing Is Easy - pink vinyl JT – 511 etched in off trail wax
- 71031 – Blood Sweat & Tears – BS&T 5
- 71032 – The Beatles – Yellow Matter Custard
- 71033 – Bob Dylan – Burn Some More
- 71034 – Bob Dylan – Best Of Great White Wonder
- 71035 – Buffalo Springfield, Neil Young, CSN&Y – Springfield Roots
- 71036 – Cat Stevens – Father & Son
- 71037 – Grateful Dead – In Concert
- 71038 – Jefferson Airplane – Winterland 1970 / Tapes from The Mothership
- 71039 – The Who – Closer To Queen Mary
- 71040 – Pink Floyd – Omayyad
- 71041 – Led Zeppelin – Mudslide
- 71042 – Jimi Hendrix – Good Vibes
- 71043 – Bob Dylan – Let Me Die In My Footsteps
- 71044 – Jethro Tull – Flute Cake
- 71045 – Bob Dylan – Troubled Troubador
- 71046 – John Lennon – Telecasts
- 71047 – Leon Russell – Session
- 71048 – The Beatles – Outtakes 1
- 71049 – The Beatles – Outtakes 2
- 71050 – Bob Dylan – Isle Of Wight
- 71051 – Bob Dylan – Blind Boy Grunt
- 71052 – Rod Stewart & The Faces – Had Me A Real Good Time
- 71053 – Moody Blues – Bushbuck
- 71054 – David Bowie – In Person
- 71055 – Bob Dylan – The Demo Tapes
- 71056 – Pete Townshend – The Genius Of ...
- 71057 – Rolling Stones – Burning At The Hollywood Palladium 1972
- 71058 – Grateful Dead – San Francisco 1
- 71059 – Frank Zappa & Hot Rats – At The Olympic
- 71060 – Jimi Hendrix – Good Karma
- 71061 – Bob Dylan – Don't Look Back
- 71062 – David Bowie – In America
- 71063 – Neil Young – Boulder, Colorado
- 71064 – Grateful Dead – Hollywood Palladium 1
- 71065 – The Beatles – Hollywood Bowl 1964
- 71066 – Yes – On Tour
- 71067 – Deep Purple – Purple For A Day
- 71068 – The Beatles – Get Back Session 2
- 71069 – Bob Dylan – BBC Broadcast (Only exists as a double LP with a single LP serial number)
- 71070 – Led Zeppelin – BBC Broadcast
- 71071 – The Who – Fillmore East
- 71072 – Neil Young – BBC Broadcast
- 71073 – Santana – Hot & Alive
- 71074 – David Bowie – All American Bowie
- 71075 – Rolling Stones – Bright Lights Big City
- 71076 – The Beatles – Spicy Beatles Songs
- 71077 – The Who – Radio London
- 71078 – Rolling Stones – San diego '69
- 71079 – Jimi Hendrix – Good Karma 2
- 71080 – Rolling Stones – Welcome To New York
- 71081 – The Yardbirds – Rarities
- 71082 – Derek and the Dominos – Stormy Monday
- 71083 – Bob Dylan – Early 60s Revisited
- 71084 – The Kinks – Long Tall Sally
- 71085 – Bad Company – Boblingen
- 71086 – Rolling Stones – European Tour '73
- KEYLO102 – Leon Russell – Recorded live from an earlier Broadcast
- MR1369 – Elton John – Country Comfort
- 1816 – Rolling Stones – Stone Relics
- 1817 – Rod Stewart & the Faces – Dancing in the street
- 1844 – Procol Harum – Shine on live
- 1845 – Jethro Tull – Ticketon
- 1852 – Led Zeppelin – Stairway To Heaven
- 1859 – Leon Russell – Oakie from Tulsa
- 1867 – Rod Stewart & the Faces – Performance

TMOQ (I) double LPs :

- 72001 – Bob Dylan – Great White Wonder
- 72002 – Led Zeppelin – Live On Blueberry Hill
- 72003 – Jimi Hendrix – Hendrix Alive
- 72004 – Led Zeppelin – Going to California
- 72005 – David Crosby & Graham Nash – A Very Stoney Evening
- 72006 – Rolling Stones – Winter Tour 1973 (All Meat Music)
- 72007 – Led Zeppelin – Bonzo's Birthday Party
- 72008 – Grateful Dead – Out West Hollywood Palladium 2
- 72009 – Rolling Stones – Gimme Shelter
- 72010 – Jethro Tull – Forum '73
- 72011 – Rolling Stones – Summer Reruns
- 72012 – The Beatles – Vancouver
- 72013 – Alice Cooper – You're All Crazier Than I Am ( Only exist with "Smoking Pig" label )
- 72014 – Grateful Dead – Filmore West
- 72015 – Jethro Tull – Supercharged ( Only exist with "Smoking Pig" label )
- 72016 – Led Zeppelin – Three Days After ( Only exist with "Smoking Pig" label )
- 72017 – Rolling Stones – Mick's Birthday Party ( Only exist with "Smoking pig" label )
- 72018 – The Who – Jaguar ( Only exist with "Smoking Pig" label )
- 72019 – Led Zeppelin – V-1/2 ( Only exist with "Smoking Pig" label )
- 1401 – Paul McCartney& Wings – In concert in Copenhagen
- 1847/2810 – David Bowie – Live At Santa Monica Civic
- 2804 – Pink Floyd – Live (aka Cymbaline)
- 2806 – Rolling Stones – Get Your Rocks Off

TMOQ (I) double LPs budget series:

- 7501 – Bob Dylan – BBC Broadcast
- 7502 – Jimi Hendrix – Broadcasts / Maui Hawaii
- 7503 – Jethro Tull – My God / Nothing Is Easy
- 7504 – The Who & Townshend – Closer To Queen Mary / Genius Of Pete Townshend
- 7505 – Rolling Stones – European Tour 1970 / Burning At The Hollywood Palladium
- 7506 – Frank Zappa – 200 Motels / At The Lympic
- 7507 – Bob Dylan – While The Establishment Burns / Isle Of Wight
- 7508 – The Beatles – Outtakes 1 / Outtakes 2
- 7509 – Jimi Hendrix – Hendrix Alive ( Released with "Stout die-cut cover" and on MCV )
- 7510 – David Crosby & Graham Nash – A Very Stoney Evening

TMOQ (I) 7" single series :

- 9001 – Rolling Stones – Cops and Robbers
- 9002 – Bad Company – In Concert

TMOQ (I) single LP deluxe series :

- 61001 – Yardbirds – Golden Eggs
- 61002 – Bob Dylan – Melbourne Australia 1966
- 61003 – Yardbirds – More Golden Eggs

TMOQ (I) double LP deluxe series :

- 62001 – The Who – Who's Zoo
- 62002 – The Who – Tales Of The Who

TMOQ (I) triple LP deluxe series :

- 63001 – Bob Dylan – Saint Valentine's Day Massacre

TMOQ (I) single LP deluxe series :

- 8201 – Deep Purple – Murky Waters
- 8202 – Pink Floyd – Nippon Connection
- 8203 – Pink Floyd – Circus Days
- 8204 – Jeff Beck – Beckfast

TMOQ (I) double LP deluxe series :

- 8205/6 – Paul McCartney – Great Dane
- 8207/8 – Rolling Stones – LA Fog

TMOQ (II) single LPs :

- 73000 – Donovan – The Reedy River
- 73001 – The Beatles – Renaissance Minstrels 1
- 73002 – The Beatles – Renaissance Minstrels 2
- 73003 – Buffalo Springfield – Springfield Roots
- 73005 – Bob Dylan – While The Establishment Burns
- 73006 – Bob Dylan – Burn Some More
- 73007 – Bob Dylan – Blind Boy Grunt
- 73008 – Bob Dylan – Best Of The Great White Wonder
- 73009 – Grateful Dead – Live In Concert
- 73010 – Grateful Dead – Silent Dead
- 73011 – Jimi Hendrix – Maui Hawaii
- 73012 – Jimi Hendrix – Broadcasts
- 73013 – Jimi Hendrix – Smashing Amps
- 73014 – Jethro Tull – My God
- 73015 – Jethro Tull – Ticketron
- 73016 – The Kinks – Kriminal
- 73017 – Led Zeppelin – Stairway To Heaven
- 73018 – Paul McCartney – James Paul McCartney
- 73019 – Moody Blues – Answer To The Mystery Of Life
- 73020 – Van Morrison – A Spawn Of The Dublin Pubs
- 73021 – Rod Stewart – Had Me A Real Good Time
- 73022 – Rolling Stones – Stone Relics
- 73023 – Rolling Stones – European Tour 1970
- 73024 – Rolling Stones – Burning At The Hollywood Palladium
- 73025 – Rolling Stones – Smooth
- 73026 – Pete Townshend – The Genius Of
- 73027 – Johnny Winter – Hot & Alive
- 73028 – Neil Young – Coming Home
- 73030 – The Beatles – The Beatles
- 73031 – Jimi Hendrix – Skyhigh
- 73032 – The Beatles – Renaissance Minstrels 3
- 73033 – Rolling Stones – Get Your Leeds Lungs Out
- 73034 – Bob Dylan – Bridgett's Album
- 73035 – Van Morrison – Belfast Cowboy
- 73036 – Poco – Country Bump
- 73037 – Randy Newman – Live At Paul's Mall Boston
- 73038 – Joni Mitchell – Lights out In Georgia
- 73039 – Elton John – More rock from Elton
- 1704 – Beatles – Hollywood Bowl
- 1800 – The Beatles – Last live show
- 1802 – Bob Dylan – Stealin
- 1803 – Bob Dylan – John Birch Society Blues
- 1804 – Bob Dylan – Talking Bear Mountain Massacre Picnic Blues
- 1805 – Bob Dylan – Seems Like A Freeze Out
- 1807 – Neil Young – Live at The Los Angeles Music Center
- 1809 – Cat Stevens – Father & son
- 1810 – Jefferson Airplane – Winterland 1970 / Tapes from The Mothership
- 1811 – Rolling Stones – Live'r Than You'll Ever Be
- 1812 – Rolling Stones – London Roundhouse
- 1813 - Jimi Hendrix - "Royal Albert Hall, London, 24 February 1969"
- 1817 – Rod Stewart & the Faces – Dancing in the street
- 1818 – Bob Dylan – GWW Royal Albert Hall
- 1824 – Beatles – In Atlanta Whiskey flats
- 1825 – Leon Russell – Recorded live from an earlier broadcast ( A Keylo production )
- 1826 – Led Zeppelin – Mudslide
- 1827 – Jethro Tull – Nothing is easy
- 1828 – Jethro Tull – Flute cake
- 1830 – Pink Floyd – Omayyad
- 1831 – The Who – Closer to Queen Mary
- 1832 – Rod Stewart & the Faces – Plynth
- 1834 – John Lennon – Telecast
- 1837 – Traffic – Traffic jam
- 1839 – Jefferson Airplane – Up Against The wall
- 1842 – Frank Zappa / Mothers – 200 Motels
- 1844 – Procol Harum – Shine on live
- 1846 – The Who – Fillmore East
- 1849 – Bob Dylan – Burn Some More
- 1850 – Jimi Hendrix – Good Vibes
- 1851 – Jimi Hendrix – Good Karma
- 1854 – Bob Dylan – VD Waltz
- 1855 – Bob Dylan – Isle of Wight
- 1856 – Bob Dylan – Troubled Troubador
- 1858 – The Beatles – Yellow Matter Custard
- 1859 – Leon Russell – Oakie from Tulsa
- 1861 – Bob Dylan – GWW The Demo tapes
- 1862 – Bob Dylan – Don't look back
- 1867 – Rod Stewart & the Faces – Performance
- 1888 – David Bowie – The All American Bowie
- 1889 – Rolling Stones – San Diego '69
- 1890 – Rolling Stones – Bright Lights Big City
- 1892 – The Beatles – Spicy Beatles songs
- 1894 – Neil Young – BBC Broadcast
- 71082 – Derek and the Dominos – Stormy Monday
- 71085 – Bad Company – Boblingen
- KEYLO102 – Leon Russell – Recorded live from an earlier Broadcast
- 2815C/D – Rolling Stones – Welcome to New York
- BlindBoy9 – Bob Dylan – Blind Boy Grunt
- RAH 115 – Bob Dylan – GWW Royal Albert Hall (B&W wrap around cover)
- BD001 – Bob Dylan – Let me die in my footsteps

TMOQ (II) double LPs :

- 2800 – Bob Dylan – Great White Wonder
- 2801 – Led Zeppelin – Live On Blueberry Hill
- 2802 – Jimi Hendrix – Hendrix Alive (probably does not exist)
- 2804 – Pink Floyd – Live (aka Cymbaline)
- 2805 – Grateful Dead – Out West Fillmore West
- 2806 – Rolling Stones – Get your rocks off
- 1847/2810 – David Bowie – Live At Santa Monica Civic
- 2811 – Rolling Stones – Winter Tour 1973 (All Meat Music)
- 2816 – Led Zeppelin – Bonzo's Birthday Party
- 2820 – Led Zeppelin – Live in Seattle
- XCN1/2/3/4 – David Crosby & Graham Nash – A Very Stony Evening
- LZ1234 – Led Zeppelin – Going to California
- JT538 – Jethro Tull – Forum '73

== See also ==
- List of record labels
