= Cadillacs and Dinosaurs =

Cadillacs and Dinosaurs may refer to:

- Xenozoic Tales, or Cadillacs and Dinosaurs, an American comic book series and its adaptations
  - Cadillacs and Dinosaurs (role-playing game), a 1990 role-playing game
  - Cadillacs and Dinosaurs (video game), a 1993 video game
  - Cadillacs and Dinosaurs (TV series), a 1993 American–Canadian animated television series
  - Cadillacs and Dinosaurs: The Second Cataclysm, a 1994 video game

== See also ==
- Cadillac (disambiguation)
- Dinosaur (disambiguation)
