= Ultra Rare Trax =

Bootleg album series by The Beatles

Ultra Rare Trax was a series of bootleg recordings of the Beatles, featuring studio outtakes, that first appeared in 1988. It took advantage of a legal loophole known as the "protection gap" that allowed bootleggers to release old recordings due to ambiguous copyright laws. In all, eight volumes were produced. It was not the first Beatles bootleg to appear on compact disc but it was the first one to achieve widespread attention with bootleggers, because its sound quality showed what digital remastering was capable of.

== History ==
The bootleg appeared after John Barrett, an engineer at Abbey Road Studios, performed an audit of the material in the studio's archives in 1984 and made backups onto tape with the strict condition that they were not to be copied or sold. However, a Dutch collector managed to purchase some studio tapes for $20,000, which were subsequently resold to a German fan, Dieter Schubert. Schubert believed that any studio recordings made before Germany's ratification of the Rome Convention in 1966 were public domain in that country, and therefore decided to create his own bootleg label, Swingin' Pig, and released his titles on CD. The logo and name were based on the earlier Trademark of Quality bootleg label that regularly featured William Stout's artwork on its covers.

One bootlegger claimed it to be "the single most important release in the history of CDs ... the quality just blew people's minds". Author Clinton Heylin believes some tracks on the Ultra Rare Trax series sounded even better than the then recent CD reissues of official material from EMI.

EMI Records, which held copyrights to the Beatles' studio recordings, was unhappy that somebody had effectively stolen work they held the rights to and released it. A representative was "mortified" to discover that the first volume of Ultra Rare Trax contained previously unreleased recordings of "I Saw Her Standing There" and "Strawberry Fields Forever", and the original 1963 recording of "One After 909" that was intended for Please Please Me. EMI representative Mike Heatley said in an interview with ICE Magazine that he had no idea how a bootlegger had managed to obtain such high-quality recordings. The bootleg also convinced fans that there was far more unreleased material in the EMI vaults than was previously thought.

Some of the material on the Ultra Rare Trax series was subsequently officially released on the Anthology series in the mid-1990s, though Michael Callucci, writing for Classic Rock magazine, claims the original bootlegs are still worth hearing as they contain material not on the official release.

== Sources ==
- Cummings, Alex (2013). Democracy of Sound: Music Piracy and the Remaking of American Copyright in the Twentieth Century. Oxford University Press. ISBN 978-0-1998-5822-4.
- Heylin, Clinton (1994). The Great White Wonders : A History of Rock Bootlegs. Viking. ISBN 978-0-6708-5777-7.
- Paradise, Paul (1999). Trademark Counterfeiting, Product Piracy, and the Billion Dollar Threat to the U.S. Economy. Greenwood Publishing Group. ISBN 978-1-5672-0250-2.
