= Dinosaur (disambiguation) =

Dinosaurs constitute a group of animals of the clade Dinosauria.

Dinosaur, dinosaurs, or Dinosauria may also refer to:

== Places ==
- Dinosaur, Colorado, a town in the United States
- Dinosaur Cove, a fossil-bearing site in Australia
- Dinosaur National Monument, in Colorado and Utah in the United States
- Dinosauria (museum), France

== Literature ==
- "Dinosaurs" (short story), 1987 story by Walter Jon Williams
- "The Dinosaur" (short story), 1959 story by Augusto Monterroso
- Dinosaurs (Holtz book), book by Thomas R. Holtz, Jr.
- National Geographic Dinosaurs, 2001 book about dinosaurs
- The Dinosaurs (1981 book), edited by Byron Preiss
- Dinosaur Tales, 1983 collection by Ray Bradbury
- Dinosaurs! (1990 anthology), science-fiction anthology
- Dinosaurs (1996 anthology), science-fiction anthology
- The Dinosauria, nonfiction book about dinosaurs

== Music ==
- "Dinosaur" (Kesha song), 2010
- "Dinosaur" (Kisschasy song), 2010
- "Dinosaurs" (song), 2018 single from Ruby Fields
- "Dinosaur", single from King Crimson's 1996 album Thrak
- "Dinosaur", 1995 single by Vowel Movement
- Dinosaur (Dinosaur Jr. album), 1985
- Dinosaur, initial name of the band Dinosaur Jr.
- Dinosaur (band), English jazz ensemble
- Dinosaurs (band), Bay Area rock band
- Wee Sing Dinosaurs, 1991 album
- Dinosaur (B'z album), 2017
- Dinosaur, 2022 single by Theory of a Deadman from the 2023 album of the same name
- Dinosaur, unreleased extended play by Tyler Gregory Okonma, 2008- 2009
- "Dinosaur Song", a 1975 song by Johnny Cash

== Television and film ==
- Dinosaur! (1985 film), American television documentary
- Dinosaur!, 1991 A&E documentary mini-series, hosted by Walter Cronkite
- Dinosaur (2000 film), American live-action/animated film produced by Walt Disney Feature Animation
- Dinosaur (1980 film), short film by Will Vinton
- Dinosaurs – The Movie, alternative title of Adventures in Dinosaur City (1991)
- Dinosaurs (TV series), an American family sitcom (1991–1994)
- Dinosaurs: Giants of Patagonia, 2007 film
- The Dinosaurs!, a 1992 TV miniseries
- Dinosaurus!, a 1960 science fiction film directed by Irvin Yeaworth
- Dinosaur (TV series), a 2024 British comedy series
- The Dinosaurs, a 2026 Netflix documentary series

== Others ==
- Dinosaur (Disney's Animal Kingdom), a defunct ride at Walt Disney World, Florida
- Dempster Dinosaur, a garbage truck made by Dempster Brothers, Inc.
- Dinosaur Bar-B-Que, a restaurant, blues venue, and bar chain in New York
- Dinosaur Comics, a webcomic by Canadian writer Ryan North
- Dinosaur Game, 2014 browser game developed by Google

== See also ==
- Dinosaurus, an extinct genus of therapsid
- Dinosaurchestra, a 2006 album by Neil Cicierega
- Boeing X-20 Dyna-Soar, a US Air Force program to develop a spaceplane
- Dino (disambiguation)
- Saur (disambiguation)
