= Nissenson =

Surname

Nissenson is a surname. Notable people with the surname include:

- Hugh Nissenson (1933–2013), American author
- Jack Nissenson (1933–2015), Canadian folk musician
- Mary Nissenson (1952–2017), American television journalist, entrepreneur, social activist, and university instructor
