= Golden Eggs =

Compilation album (bootleg) by The Yardbirds
- Released: 1975
- Recorded: 1964–1967
- Studio: UK and US studios
- Genre: Rock, blues rock, psychedelic rock
- Length: 45:46
- Label: Trademark of Quality

Golden Eggs is an unlicensed compilation of previously released recordings by English rock group the Yardbirds. The LP record album was originally issued in 1975 by Trademark of Quality (TMQ), a Los Angeles–based enterprise that specialised in bootleg recordings.

The albums contains studio recordings by the group between 1964 and 1968. About half of the tracks had been issued as the A-side and B-sides of singles (including two solo songs by singer Keith Relf), but remained unreleased on albums at the time. The balance is made up of album tracks, most of which were unreleased in the UK.

The material, which was largely out of print in 1975, draws heavily on the Jimmy Page-era Yardbirds, plus a few recordings with Eric Clapton and Jeff Beck. Due to its popularity, a sequel, More Golden Eggs, was issued by TMQ. Both albums featured cover artwork by William Stout.

== Background ==
The Yardbirds were the band that guitarists Eric Clapton, Jeff Beck, and Jimmy Page first found commercial success. By 1975, all three had achieved superstar status, and consequently there was a strong interest in their former group's recorded output. Much of the Yardbirds' catalogue was out-of-print by 1975. The bootleg manufacturer Trademark of Quality (TMQ) saw the opportunity for a commercially viable re-release of this material.

Golden Eggs was something of a first – up until that point, rock bootlegs had been the domain of only the most successful acts, such as Bob Dylan, the Rolling Stones, and the Beatles. Golden Eggs was the first big selling bootleg that dealt with a disbanded group who had reasonable but not great chart success. At a time where reissues of old material were not commonplace, the bootleg became popular.

== Song selection ==
Most of the songs that appear on the album were considered rarities at the time. They included songs which had only been released on singles or out-of-print albums, such as Little Games, the only album the Yardbirds recorded with Page. Two songs from a solo single by lead singer Keith Relf were added to the album, although they did not reflect the Yardbirds' sound or style.

"Stroll On", which had only been available on the Blow-Up soundtrack album, was included. It is one of the few recordings to feature both Beck and Page on dual lead guitars. "Think About It", B-side of the last Yardbirds' single, was released only months before Led Zeppelin was formed. Page later used the guitar solo from the song for his solo in "Dazed and Confused", one of Zeppelin's signature songs.

== Artwork ==
The cover artwork was drawn by William Stout, who had already designed several TMQ album covers. Stout was keen to do the cover, since he was a fan of the group and gave thanks to them on the back cover for "inspiration". He also designed the back cover as a family tree, showing the careers of the various ex-members of the group up until that point.

The weasel on the cover is, according to Stout, killing off the goose that laid the golden egg, and supposed to represent the producer Mickie Most. According to Stout, he felt that Most steered the group away from their blues rock origins towards recording pop material, which, in Stout's opinion, was detrimental towards their career and did not illustrate their full potential.

== Releases and critical reception ==
Golden Eggs was released by TMQ in 1975. Almost immediately, it was copied by Phony Graf, another bootlegger. Their release used black and white inserts of the front and rear covers, instead of Stout's colour artwork.

All of the songs were later made available on authorized CD compilations, such as Little Games Sessions and More (1992), Train Kept A-Rollin' - The Complete Giorgio Gomelsky Productions (1993) (re-released in 2002 as The Yardbirds Story), and Ultimate! (2001).

Professional ratings
Review scores
Source	Rating
AllMusic	3/5 stars

In a review for AllMusic, music critic Richie Unterberger gave the album three out of five stars. He noted that "this did collectors quite a service at the time, assembling 17 of the Yardbirds' rarest tracks – from non-LP singles, soundtracks, and rare LPs – onto one LP". However, he added that more recent Yardbirds reissues and compilations have made the album "virtually useless".

== Track listing ==
Side one
No.	Title	Original release	Length
1.	"Steeled Blues"	B-side of "Heart Full of Soul"	2:37
2.	"Putty in Your Hands"	For Your Love (US)	2:17
3.	"Mr. Zero"	A-side Keith Relf solo	2:45
4.	"No Excess Baggage"	Little Games (US)	2:29
5.	"Think About It"	B-side of "Goodnight Sweet Josephine" (US)	3:47
6.	"Stroll On"	Blow-Up	2:43
7.	"The Nazz Are Blue"	Yardbirds a.k.a. Roger the Engineer (UK)	3:00
8.	"Knowing"	B-side Relf solo	1:53
9.	"Little Soldier Boy"	Little Games	2:33

Side two
No.	Title	Original release	Length
10.	"Puzzles"	B-side of "Little Games"	2:01
11.	"Stealing Stealing"	Little Games	2:21
12.	"Sweet Music"	For Your Love	2:28
13.	"Ha Ha Said the Clown"	A-side single (US)	2:23
14.	"Rack My Mind"	Yardbirds a.k.a. Roger the Engineer	3:10
15.	"Ten Little Indians"	A-side single (US)	2:13
16.	"Goodnight Sweet Josephine"	A-side single (US)	2:44
17.	"Glimpses"	Little Games	4:22

== Personnel ==
- Keith Relf – vocals (except 1 and 7), harmonica
- Jim McCarty – drums (except 3, 8, 13, 15, and 16)
- Chris Dreja – rhythm guitar on 1, 2, 7, 12 and 14; bass on 4, 5, 6, 9, 10, 11, and 17
- Paul Samwell-Smith – bass on 1, 2, 7, 12 and 14
- Eric Clapton – lead guitar on 2 and 12
- Jeff Beck – lead guitar on 1, 6, 7 and 14; vocals on 7
- Jimmy Page – lead guitar on 4, 5, 6, 9, 10, 11, 15, 16 and 17

Relf is backed by session musicians on 3, 8, and 13. Relf and Page are backed by session musicians on 15 and 16.
