= The Amazing Kornyfone Record Label =

American bootlegging record label

The Amazing Kornyfone Record Label (TAKRL) was one of the first bootlegging record labels in America. Kornyfone was based in Southern California in the 1970s. The label released albums from such artists as The Beatles, David Bowie, Bob Dylan, The Grateful Dead, Led Zeppelin, Elton John, Joni Mitchell, Pink Floyd, Genesis, and others. Kornyfone was known for its packaging, with interesting artwork and informative covers.

According to Clinton Heylin, "Though Dub's output [at TMQ] in the five years separating Great White Wonder from Tales from The Who had outstripped any of his competitors, TMQ's catalogue pales alongside what Ken and co. unleashed between 1974 and the end of 1976. One hundred-plus titles from the flagship label, The Amazing Kornyphone Record Label, were supplemented by represses of Smokin' Pig titles, thirty-two titles on TKRWM (The Kornyphone Records for the Working Man), a dozen double-albums on Singer's Original Double Discs (SODD), 20 releases on the Phonygraf label (Phonygraf), and sixteen releases on Highway High Fi Collector's Edition Records (HHCER) (which regularly appeared with TAKRL or Smokin' Pig labels - just to add to the confusion)." The TAKRL label was active between 1974 and 1977. In 1978 they re-pressed some of their titles with black and white covers.

== Releases ==
- 1373-RS – George Harrison – US tour 1974 : Let's Hear One for Lord Budda
- 1374-RS – The Beatles – EMI outtakes
- 1375-RS – Yes – Live in Amsterdam
- 1376-RS – Deep Purple – Glutton for punishment
- 1377-RS – Queen – Royal American tour
- 1379-RS – Black Sabbath – Gr'ndlepol
- 1380-RS – Elton John – Closet keepers
- 1387-RS – Yardbirds – Golden eggs
- 1900 – The Beatles – On stage in Japan : The 1966 tour
- 1901 – The Jeff Beck Group – European tour
- 1902 – Blind Faith – Recorded live along the U.S. tour
- 1903 – Pink Floyd – In celebration of the comet
- 1904 – Cat Stevens – The Hoaxer's midnight daydream
- 1905 – David Bowie – Dollars in drag : The 1980 floor show
- 1906 – Fleetwood Mac – Merely a Portmanteau
- 1907 – Elton John – Rock and roll Madonna
- 1908 – Joe Cocker – The lost live album
- 1909 – Frank Zappa/Mothers – Poot face boogie
- 1910 – Moody Blues – Grande toure
- 1911 – Emerson, Lake and Palmer – The callow and cash and idle eyes
- 1912 – Bob Dylan – Ode for Barbara Allen
- 1913 – Pink Floyd – Nocturnal submission : robot love
- 1914 – The Yardbirds – Last hurray in the big apple
- 1915 – David Bowie – Good enough to eat : Soft in the middle
- 1916 – The Who – Decidedly belated response
- 1917 – Neil Young – The last album
- 1918 – Mott The Hoople – Behind Enemy Lines
- 1919 – The Rolling Stones – The Jean-Clarke Mammorial Sonic Barbecue
- 1920 – Procol Harum – Tales with tangrams
- 1921 – Buffalo Springfield – Stampede : the gold star acetates
- 1922 – The Bonzo Dog Band – Loose Caboose
- 2922 – Bob Dylan – Lovesongs for America : Cast-off Lungs and Retoughed Badlands
- 1923 – The Mahavishnu Orchestra – Bundled Sunspray Demise
- 1924 – Steely Dan – Rotoscope Down Pleasantly Retired (A Peak Behind the Curtain)
- 2924 – Emerson, Lake and Palmer – The 1972 American tour
- 1925 – Joni Mitchell – Lennie and Dom Songs (Early On)
- 1926 – Rick Wakeman – Unleashing the Tethered One
- 1927 – Van Der Graaf Generator – Fellow Traveller
- 2927 – Elton John – No title
- 1928 – King Crimson – Un Rêve Sans Conséquence Spéciale
- 1929 – Frank Zappa / Mothers – Safe Muffinz
- 1930 – Deep Purple – Perks and tit
- 1931 – Traffic – On by the way
- 1932 – Alice Cooper – Parricidal slumbers
- 1933 – Pink Floyd – Ohn suite ohm : we've blown (ahhaa!) the clone
- 1934 – Santana – Flako De '57 Sportshirt
- 1935 – David Bowie – Last stand : his masters voice
- 1936 – The Nazz – Twenty/twenty hindsight
- 2936 – The Who – Jaguar anyone?
- 1937 – Lothar and The Hand People – Spores
- 2937 – Crosby, Stills, Nash and Young – Nice to see you : the nineteen seventy-four excursion
- 1938 – Chicago – On stage
- 1939 – Robin Trower – Guitar bandit
- 1940 – The Kinks – Survivors
- 1941 – The Rolling Stones – Bedspring symphony
- 1942 – Little Feat – Electrif lycanthrope
- 1943 – Gentle Giant – Playing the foole
- 1944 – Elton John – Just like strange rain : pink-eyed in paradise part one
- 1945 – Genesis – As though emerald city
- 1946 – Elton John – All across the havens : pink-eyed in paradise part two - sourced from a video soundtrack of the Hammersmith Odeon show of 24 December 1974.
- 1947 – Sparks – One and a half-Nelson
- 1948 – Michael Giles/Peter Giles/Robert Fripp – The cheerful insanity of Giles, Giles and Fripp
- 1949 – Joni Mitchell – (Kept on) by her own devices
- 2949 – Jethro Tull – Supercharged again : the 1973 American tour
- 1950 – The Outlaws – Another roadside attraction
- 2950 – The Beatles – Hahst Az Sön : Two Weeks in January Nineteen Sixty-nine
- 1951 – Bad Company – Scrapbook
- 1952 – Bob Dylan – Are you now or have you ever been?
- 1953 – Roxy Music – Champagne and novocaine
- 1954 – The Doors – Moonlight drive
- 1955 – Genesis – The bedside yellow foam
- 1956 – Little Feat – Aurora backseat
- 2956 – The London Symphony Orchestra – Tommy recorded live at the Rainbow
- 1957 – Queen – Sheetkeeckers
- 1958 – 10CC – Going pink on purpose
- 1959 – The Jimi Hendrix Experience – Pipe dream
- 1960 – Steve Miller Band – The midnight toker
- 2960 – Led Zeppelin – 1975 World tour
- 1961 – Bad Company – Boblingen
- 1962-RS – Bob Dylan – Royal Albert Hall
- 1963 – Bob Dylan – Now your mouth cries wolf
- 1964 – Boz Scaggs – Jump street jive drive
- 2964 – Led Zeppelin – Live in Seattle
- 2965 – David Bowie – Live at Santa Monica Civic
- 1966-RS – Led Zeppelin – Cellarful of noise (with Live in Japan subtitle)
- 1967-RS – Bad Company – Live in Japan
- 1968 – King Crimson – Heretic
- 3969 – Pink Floyd – Crackers
- 1970 – The Kinks – Don't touch that dial!
- 1971 – Beck, Bogert & Appice – Somewhere over the rainbow
- 1972 – Bob Dylan – Joaquin antique
- 1973 – Pink Floyd – Raving and drooling
- 1974 – Electric Light Orchestra – Wholly Edison
- 1975 – Genesis – Awed man out
- 1976 – Little Feat – Beak positive
- 1977 – Roxy Music – Foolproof
- 1978 – Roxy Music – Absinthe makes the heart grow fondle
- 2979 – Grateful Dead – Make believe ballroom
- 1980 – Gram Parsons/The International Submarine Band – The devil and the deep blue sea
- 2980 – Genesis – Swelled and spent
- 1981 – Yes – The Affirmery
- 1982 – Patti Smith Group – Canine teardrop
- 2982 – Bob Dylan – passed over and rolling thunder
- 1983 – Gentle Giant – Among the darkers
- 1984 – Groucho Marx – I never kissed an ugly woman
- 1990 – Procol Harum – Five and a dime
- 1991 – The Tubes – Darted in my armchair
- 1992 – Little Feat – Rampant Syncopatio
- 1993 – Jackson Browne – The return of the common man
- 1994 – Electric Light Orchestra – Freedom city pandemonium
- 2995 – David Bowie – Resurrection on 84th street
- 1996 – Todd Rundgren/Utopia – Nimbus Thitherward
- 1997 – Queen – Command performance
- 1999 – Bob Dylan – Bridgett's album
- 24900 – Bob Dylan – Live in Adelaide Australia 1978
- 24901 – Eagles – Crazed & snake-eyed
- 24902 – Fleetwood Mac – Will the real Fleetwood Mac please stand up
- 24903 – Bruce Springsteen – You can trust your car to the man who wears the star
- 24904 – Rainbow – Live in Australia
- 24905 – Genesis – Live in Newcastle 1973
- 24906 – Genesis – Recorded live at the Felt Forum
- 24907 – Frank Zappa/ Mothers – No commercial potential
- 24909 – Rolling Stones – Nasty songs
- 24910 – Bob Dylan – The Hurricane Carter benefit
- 24911 – Elvis Presley – Memories
- 24912 – Elvis Presley – Trouble bound
- 24913 – Elvis Presley – The Vegas years
- 900 – Bob Dylan – Royal Albert Hall
- 901 – Elvis Costello – The Kornyfone Radio hour
- 902 – Fleetwood Mac – The rockhoppers live in Japan
- 903 – Patti Smith – Hard nipples
- 904 – Emerson, Lake and Palmer – The 1978 world tour
- 905 – Supertramp – The 1986 American tour
- 906 – Crosby, Nash & Young – Waterbrothers
- 907 – Aerosmith – Look homeward angel
- 908 – Neil Young – The 1970 Carnegie Hall show
- 909 – Fleetwood Mac – Offhand
- 910 – Led Zeppelin – Ballcrusher
- 911 – Jefferson Starship – Fasten your seatbelt
- 912 – Patti Smith – In heat
- 913 – Deep Purple – Guitar Slaughterhouse
- 914 – Deep Purple – Live in London
- 915 – Yes – Live at the Rainbow
- 916 – Sex Pistols – Live at Winterland
- 918 – Led Zeppelin – Live in England 1976
- 919 – Patti Smith – Teenage perversity and ships in the night
- 920 – Graham Parker – Pub rockin'
- 921 – Lynyrd Skynyrd – Flying high
- 922 – Fleetwood Mac – Play the city of the angels
- 923 – Babys – Spoiled brats
- 924 – Tom Petty – Heartbreak in N.Y.
- 925 – Linda Ronstadt – Wishin' I was a cub scout
- 926 – Foreigner – First time around
- 927 – Queen – Royal rock us
- 928 – Elvis Costello – Revelations From The Very Middle
- 929 – Sex Pistols – Sex Pistols
- 930 – Rush – Around the world recorded live
- 932 – Genesis – Recorded live at Marquee Club
- 933 – Genesis – Recorded live at Carnegie Hall 1973
- 950 – Devo – Sing if you're glad to be Devo
- 957 – Supertramp – Montreal 77
- Bozo1 – Various Artists – T'anks for the mammaries

1985 The Cult- Some Zip Gun Boogies. Sides one and two were recorded at the Underground Club on Nov. 14, 1985, and sides three and four were recorded in Italy sometime in 1986.

== See also ==
- List of record labels
