= Live'r Than You'll Ever Be =

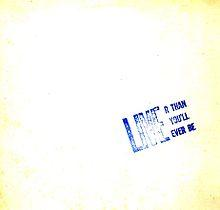
- The original cover to the album from Lurch Records

Live album (bootleg) by the Rolling Stones
- Released: December 1969
- Recorded: 9 November 1969
- Venue: Oakland–Alameda County Coliseum Arena, Oakland, California, US
- Genre: Rock
- Length: 48:36
- Label: Lurch

2001 Tarantura Records Compact Disc release
- This double-Compact Disc has become the standard release of this bootleg

Live'r Than You'll Ever Be is a bootleg recording of the Rolling Stones' concert in Oakland, California, from 9 November 1969. It was one of the first live rock music bootlegs and was made notorious as a document of their 1969 tour of the United States. The popularity of the bootleg forced the Stones' labels Decca Records in the UK, and London Records in the US, to release the live album Get Yer Ya-Ya's Out! The Rolling Stones in Concert in 1970. Live'r is also one of the earliest commercial bootleg recordings in rock history, released in December 1969, around the time of the Beatles' Kum Back and several months after Bob Dylan's Great White Wonder. Like the two earlier records, Live'r's outer sleeve is plain white, with its name stamped on in ink.

== Recording and release ==
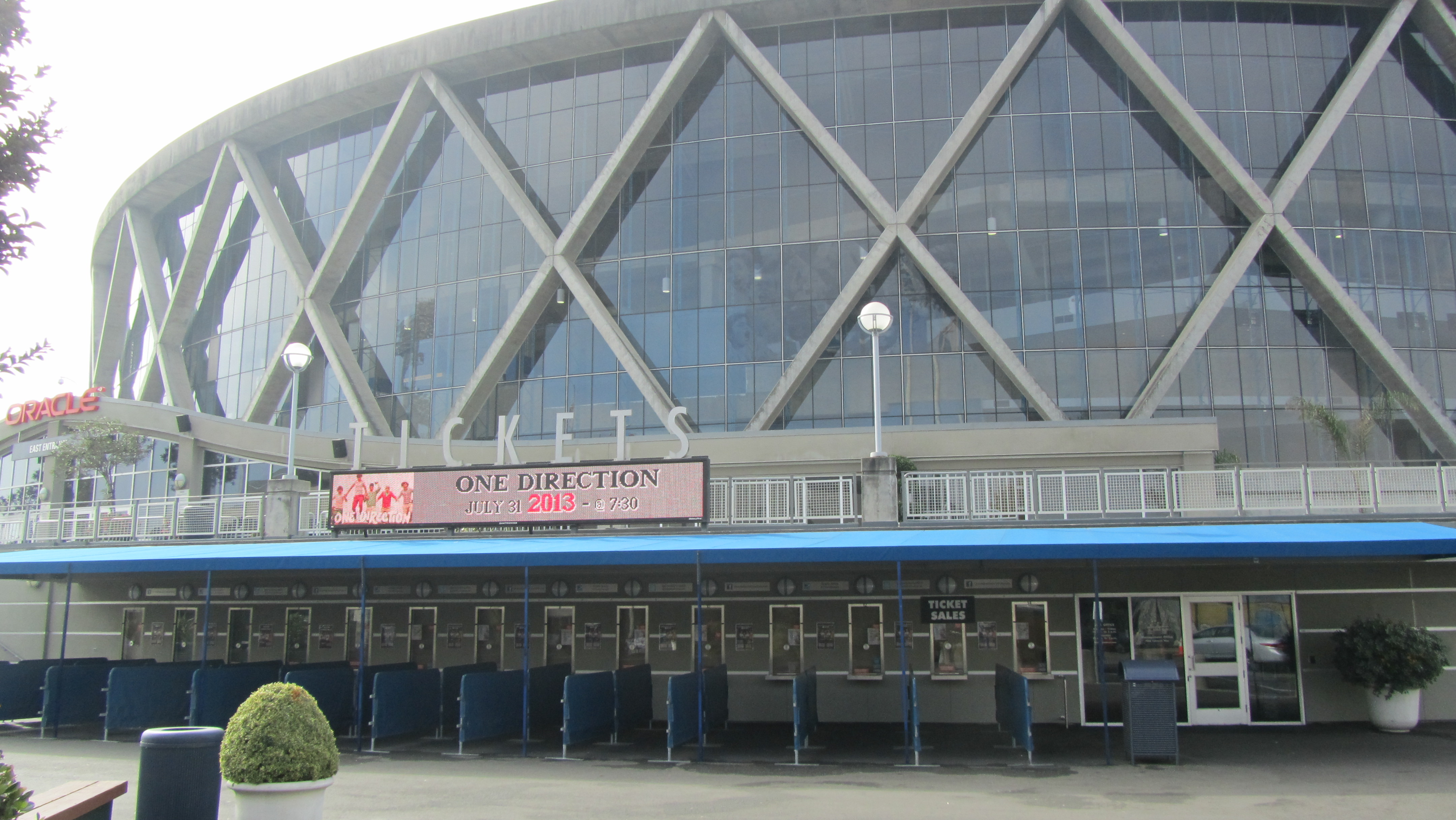
The Oakland–Alameda County Coliseum Arena was built three years prior to the recordings featured on Live'r Than You'll Ever Be and has continued to host sports games, concerts, and other events since.

Live'r Than You'll Ever Be was recorded by "Dub" Taylor from Trademark of Quality using a Sennheiser shotgun microphone and a Uher "Report 4000" reel-to-reel tape recorder. It was the first audience-recorded rock bootleg to be mastered and distributed; some sources consider it the first live bootleg. Though the sound is not nearly as clear as the official release of Get Yer Ya-Ya's Out!, the recording is considered to be very strong for an audience recording, especially one of that era. The Rolling Stones performed two sets that night and it is the second concert that was more heavily bootlegged and has sharper sound. Bootleggers had collaborated to record Stones shows across the United States, recording them on two-track Sony recorders for months prior to the release of the album. At least one source claims that the recordings initially came from rock promoter Bill Graham's staff, who used the tapes for broadcast on KSAN and released their edit on Lurch Records in early 1970.

The first copies of the LP appeared in record stores in December 1969. The quality was high enough that it was rumoured that the band had even released the bootleg themselves, and it became popular enough to spur speculation that the Stones released Ya-Ya's as a response to the bootleg. The recording has been released through several bootleg labels, including the original release by Lurch and shortly thereafter Trademark of Quality (catalogue number 71003), the Swingin' Pig Records, and Sister Morphine, usually documenting only the second set. The Swingin' Pig release even replaced performances of "Jumpin' Jack Flash" and "Under My Thumb" with different recordings from the band's 10 November performance in San Diego and their two-night stint in New York City and attempted to enhance the sound quality by using de-clicking technology—both changes have drawn criticism in comparison to the original Lurch Records release.

== Reception and influence ==
In a January 1970 review, Ralph J. Gleason of the San Francisco Chronicle declared the album's music "superb" and "so much superior" to Got Live If You Want It!, the Stones' 1966 live album. The following month, Greil Marcus reviewed the album favourably in Rolling Stone. He praised its sound, erroneously stated that 'the LP is in stereo' and speculated that it may have been recorded from the stage. The album also received praise as a more authentic example of the Stones on stage because Get Yer Ya-Ya's Out! was heavily overdubbed in many places. Richie Unterberger has noted that the recording is inferior to the sound quality of Ya-Ya's, but displays a spontaneity that the official recording lacks and this helps to explain its long-lasting appeal to fans. Reviewing the album in 1970, Wim Wenders called it "the best Rolling Stones record."

"John Peel reviewed this in Rolling Stone magazine," remarked photographer Ross Halfin, "and said that it was the greatest live album ever, and a great lost live album."

The album eventually sold enough to qualify for a gold record RIAA certification, with TMOQ sources claiming that it had sold 250,000 copies by November 1970; 150,000 of which were produced by other bootleggers. Although the album did not chart on the Billboard 200, the magazine included it in a list of best-selling bootlegs in 1971, noting that hard sales figures were impossible to confirm, but six-figure numbers had been routinely discussed. The sleeve's generic design was copied by the Who's 1970 album Live at Leeds.

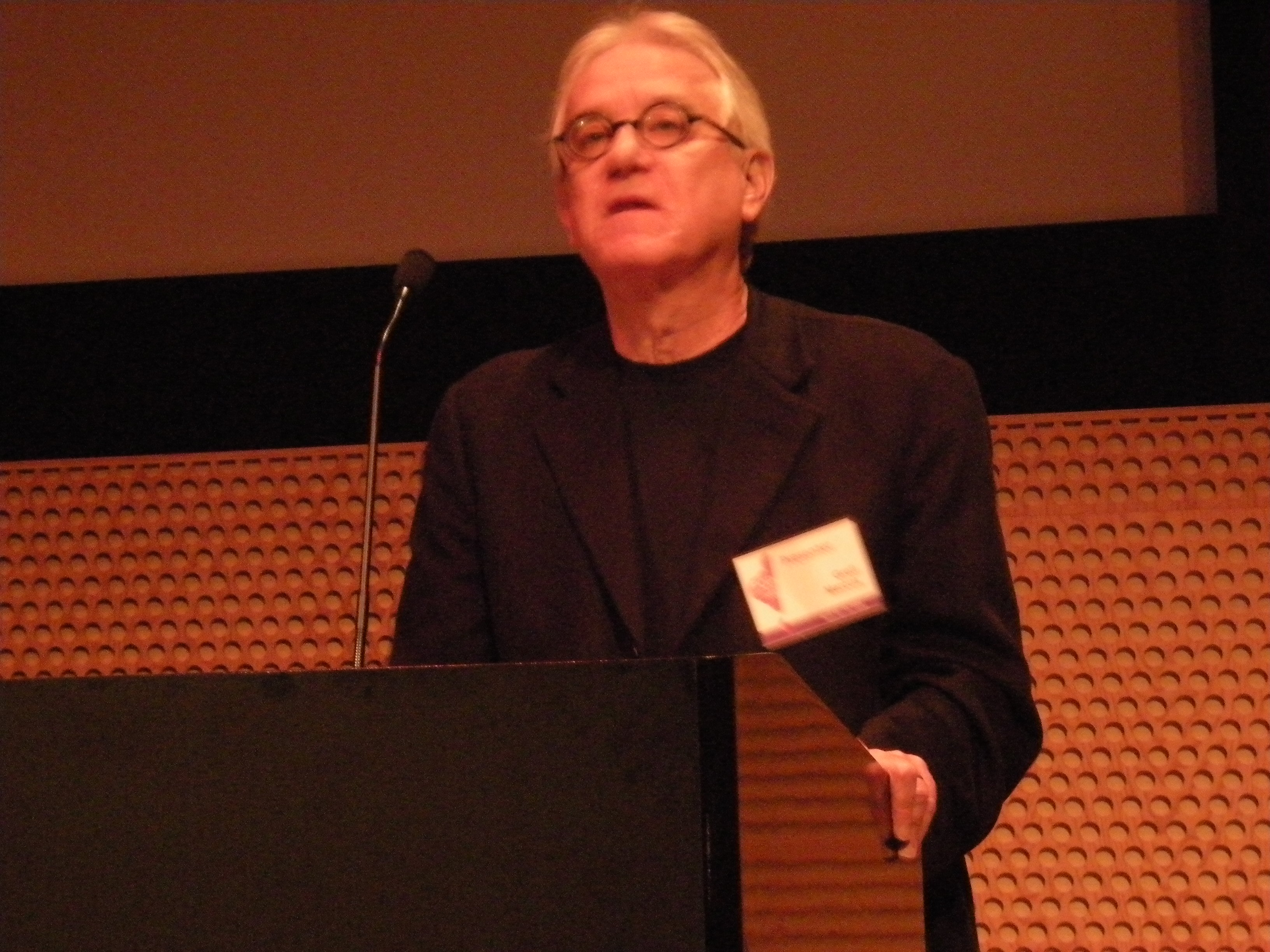
A review of the bootleg by Greil Marcus of Rolling Stone helped to promote and legitimise the bootleg

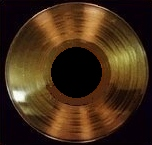
Live'r Than You'll Ever Be is a rare example of a golden record sales award granted to a bootleg

== Track listing ==
All songs written by Jagger/Richards, except where noted

Side one

1. "Carol" (Chuck Berry) – 3:44
2. "Gimme Shelter" – 4:18
3. "Sympathy for the Devil" – 6:23
4. "I'm Free" – 5:07
5. "Live with Me" – 3:33

Side two

6. "Love in Vain" (Robert Johnson) – 5:24
7. "Midnight Rambler" – 7:40
8. "Little Queenie" (Berry) – 4:13
9. "Honky Tonk Women" – 4:04
10. "Street Fighting Man" – 4:10

Different versions of the bootleg include different track listings. The Tarantura Records release includes both concerts performed on this date in their entirety and is represented here:
Disc 1 – Early Show

1. Band introduction – 1:36
2. "Jumpin' Jack Flash" – 4:51
3. "Prodigal Son" (Robert Wilkins) – 4:03
4. "You Gotta Move" (Fred McDowell and Reverend Gary Davis) – 3:18
5. "Carol" (Berry) – 3:33
6. "Sympathy for the Devil" – 6:55
7. "Stray Cat Blues" – 4:18
8. "Love in Vain" (Johnson) – 5:13
9. "I'm Free" – 5:08
10. "Under My Thumb" – 3:15
11. "Midnight Rambler" – 8:17
12. "Live with Me" – 4:00
13. "Little Queenie" (Berry) – 3:56
14. "(I Can't Get No) Satisfaction" – 6:56
15. "Honky Tonk Women" – 4:17
16. "Street Fighting Man" – 4:03

Disc 2 – Late Show

17. "Jumpin' Jack Flash" – 4:05
18. "Carol" (Berry) – 3:44
19. "Sympathy for the Devil" – 6:23
20. "Stray Cat Blues" – 4:13
21. "Prodigal Son" (Wilkins) – 3:59
22. "You Gotta Move" (McDowell and Davis) – 3:12
23. "Love in Vain" (Johnson) – 5:24
24. "I'm Free" – 5:07
25. "Under My Thumb" – 3:23
26. "Midnight Rambler" – 7:40
27. "Live with Me" – 3:33
28. "Gimme Shelter" – 4:18
29. "Little Queenie" (Berry) – 4:13
30. "(I Can't Get No) Satisfaction" – 6:04
31. "Honky Tonk Women" – 4:04
32. "Street Fighting Man" – 4:10

== Personnel ==
The Rolling Stones

- Mick Jagger – lead vocals, harmonica
- Keith Richards – lead guitar and rhythm guitar, backing vocals
- Mick Taylor – lead and rhythm guitar, slide guitar
- Bill Wyman – bass guitar
- Charlie Watts – drums and percussion

Additional musicians

- Ian Stewart – piano
