= Beatlesongs =

Compilation album by Various
- Released: 1982
- Genre: Novelty
- Label: Rhino

Beatlesongs is a 1982 compilation album, released by Rhino Records, containing novelty songs and parodies of the music of the Beatles.

The original cover (designed by underground comic and occasional album-cover artist William Stout) was subject of a public outcry as it featured a caricature of Mark David Chapman, the man who murdered John Lennon less than two years earlier. Chapman is pictured on the far left of the cover holding the end of the banner.

== Track listing ==
1. "The Invasion" - Buchanan and Greenfield
2. "Hold My Hand" - The Rutles
3. "We Love You Beatles" - The Carefrees
4. "My Boyfriend Got a Beatle Haircut" - Donna Lynn
5. "Letter from Elaina" - Casey Kasem
6. "Beatlemania" - Jack Nitzsche
7. "Beatle Rap" - The Qworymen
8. "L.S. Bumble Bee" - Peter Cook & Dudley Moore
9. "I'm the Meany" - Wild Man Fischer
10. "Pop Hates The Beatles" - Allan Sherman
11. "A Letter to the Beatles" - The Four Preps
12. "The Beetle" - Gary Usher
