= Cadillac (disambiguation) =

Cadillac is a General Motors luxury car brand.

Cadillac may also refer to:

== People ==
- Antoine de la Mothe Cadillac, French explorer, founder of Detroit
- Marie-Therese Guyon Cadillac, American pioneer
- Cadillac Anderson (born 1964) nickname of U.S. basketball player Gregory Wayne Anderson
- Cadillac Williams (born 1982) nickname of U.S. American football player Carnell Lamar Williams

== Geography ==
- Cadillac (Montreal Metro), a metro station on the green line in Montreal
- Cadillac, Gironde, a commune in the Gironde department, in southwestern France
- Cadillac, Michigan, United States
- Cadillac, Saskatchewan, Canada
- Cadillac, a former municipality now part of Rouyn-Noranda, Quebec, Canada
- Cadillac Mountain, Maine, United States
- Cadillac Ranch (disambiguation)
- Lake Cadillac, a lake in Cadillac, Michigan

== Arts, entertainment, and media ==
=== Games ===
- Cadillac, a variation on the card game Thirty-one played in south Louisiana
- Square Deal: The Game of Two Dimensional Poker, known in Japan as Cadillac II, a Hect video game
- Cadillacs and Dinosaurs (video game), a 1993 beat 'em up video game

=== Music ===
- Cadillac (album), a 1989 album by Johnny Hallyday
- Cadillac (band), a Spanish pop band
- Cadillac (record label), a jazz record label founded in the United Kingdom in 1973
- The Cadillacs, a vocal group from the United States

==== Songs ====
- "Cadillac" (Boro song), 2023
- "Cadillac" (Morgenshtern and Eldzhey song), 2020
- "Brand New Cadillac", a 1959 song also recorded as "Cadillac"
- "Cadilac" (sic), the B-side of the T. Rex 1972 single Telegram Sam
- "Cadillac", a 1960 song from Bo Diddley's album Bo Diddley Is a Gunslinger
- "Cadillac", a 1986 song from The Firm's album Mean Business
- "Cadillac", a 1989 song from Johnny Hallyday's eponymous album Cadillac
- "Cadillac", a 2011 song from the Original 7ven album Condensate
- "Cadillac", a 2020 song from the Foster the People EP In the Darkest of Nights, Let the Birds Sing

=== Other arts, entertainment, and media ===
- Cadillac, a guitar model made by Dean Guitars
- "The Cadillac", an episode of the television series Seinfeld
- Cadillacs and Dinosaurs, a TV animated series

== Brands and enterprises ==
- Cadillac Gage, now part of Textron Marine & Land Systems
- Cadillac insurance plan in the United States

== Wine and grapes ==
- Burger (grape), a California-French wine grape that is also known as Cadillac
- Cadillac AOC, the appellation d'origine contrôlée Bordeaux wine produced in the French commune
- Muscadelle, a French wine grape that is also known as Cadillac
- Trebbiano, an Italian wine grape that is also known as Cadillac

== Other uses ==
- Cadillac, an alternative name for cocaine
- Project Cadillac, a World War 2 US Navy project to develop radar-equipped early warning aircraft

== See also ==
- List of Cadillac vehicles, automobiles from GM division Cadillac
- Cadillac-en-Fronsadais, a commune in the Gironde department, in southwestern France
- Cadillac, Cadillac (2014 song) rock song by Train
