= Raúl Martín (artist) =

Spanish illustrator

Raúl Martín is a Spanish illustrator specializing in paleoart, the branch of science illustration that deals with artworks of subjects of paleontology. He is best known for his dinosaur paintings which appear in museums all over the world including the American Museum of Natural History, the Maryland Science Center, and Fort Peck Paleontology Inc. His works also notably appear in popular magazines including Scientific American, Science, and the International Edition of National Geographic. As of 2001, he works with the paleontology department at the Universidad Autónoma of Madrid, Spain, where he currently lives, as well as with the paleoanthropological team of the Atapuerca Mountains excavations.

Among Martín's most iconic works are paintings of dinosaurs and other prehistoric animals such as the giant crocodilians Deinosuchus and Sarcosuchus. He considers himself to be entirely self-taught and has drawn inspiration from hyperrealist painters including Richard Estes, Chuck Close, and Antonio López García. Throughout his career he has created paleoart in predominantly acrylic paints, but also works with oils, pastels, pencils, and more recently digital.

== See also ==
- National Geographic Dinosaurs
