= Bob Dylan bootleg recordings =

Bob Dylan bootleg recordings are unreleased performances by American singer-songwriter Bob Dylan, that have been circulated throughout the public without undergoing an official, sanctioned release. It is commonly misconceived that bootlegs are only restricted to audio, but bootleg video performances, such as Dylan's 1966 film Eat the Document, which remains officially unreleased, are considered to be bootlegs. Dylan is generally considered to be the most bootlegged artist in rock history, rivaled only by the Grateful Dead.

Due to his constant touring between 1988 and the present, and the fact that almost every show has been recorded, many of Dylan's illicit recordings come from the Never Ending Tour. However, early taped performances by friends dating from the late 1950s, concerts, Newport Folk Festival shows, demo tapes, and studio outtakes provide a wide range of unreleased material to be bootlegged.

== Early bootlegs ==
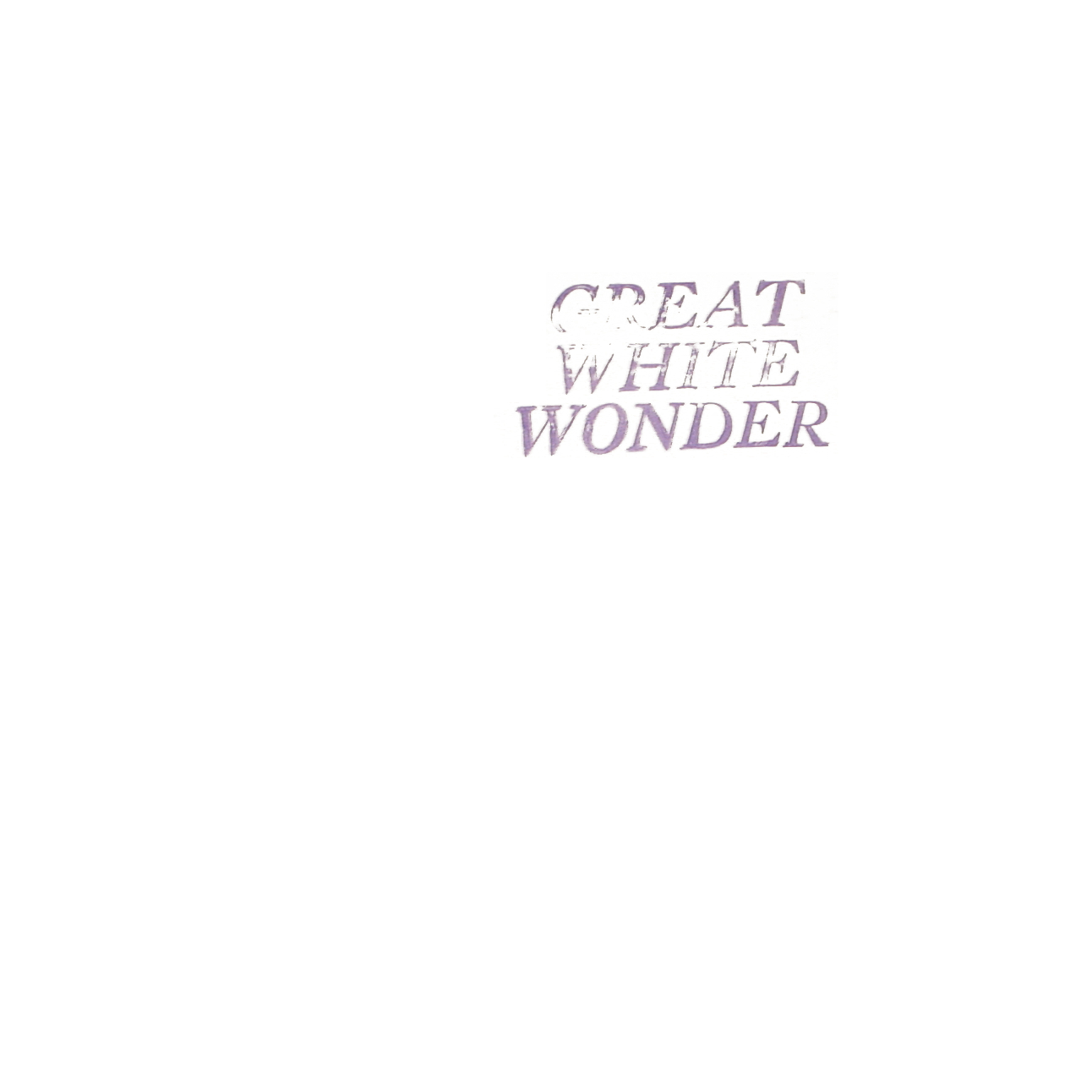
The first ever Bob Dylan bootleg album, Great White Wonder.

The first ever popular rock bootleg to appear on the black market was Dylan's Great White Wonder, a double album first coming to underground record stores in mid-1969, through a young bootleg label, "Trademark of Quality" (TMQ). It contained a variety of material: several tracks coming from a hotel rehearsal in December 1961 (recorded by then-girlfriend Bonnie Beecher), Witmark publishing demos, an interview with Pete Seeger, studio outtakes from the Highway 61 Revisited sessions, songs recorded with The Band in the summer of 1967 in Woodstock, New York (which would become known as The Basement Tapes), and one live performance from a 1969 broadcast of The Johnny Cash Show. As people began to buy the record, duplicates began to appear that were released by other young bootleg labels. These re-releases usually switched track listings, or just took a single record of the two, and released it under a different name. Generally, the quality of the recordings degenerated between different releases, because the songs were being copied from the same source many times over.

The release of the Great White Wonder gave birth to a fake bootleg that began as a gag concocted by editors at Rolling Stone magazine. The album, The Masked Marauders, was supposedly recorded during a jam session between Dylan, Mick Jagger, John Lennon, and Paul McCartney. A review of the non-existent album ran in Rolling Stone on October 18, 1969. The write-up sparked numerous inquiries from readers, and a band was hired to record first some singles, then a full album. The album was released in November 1969 under a Warner Bros. subsidiary created as part of the stunt.

Stealin, which appeared later in 1969, began to compile more studio outtakes, with many tracks coming from the Highway 61 Revisited sessions of 1965, along with tracks that also appeared on Great White Wonder. It also included takes of songs that would eventually be released by Columbia via the official "Bootleg Series". But this too began to be copied and re-released by different bootleg record labels, with sound quality suffering greatly between each copying.

1970 saw the first release of the "Royal Albert Hall" material, recorded May 17, 1966 at the Manchester Free Trade Hall, titled In 1966 There Was, which also contained tracks from a different concert on the tour. Zimmerman Looking Back was released later that year, and contained the entire electric set played on May 17, 1966, as well as four songs from the acoustic set of a concert recorded in Ireland. Over the years, many more labels began to release the electric set, generally using the phrase "Royal Albert Hall" in the title. In 1971, TMQ released just the electric set, titled GWW: Royal Albert Hall. The acoustic set was generally overlooked by the pirates, until the entire concert was officially released by Columbia in 1998.

After the early 1970s, pirates continued to copy old material, along with releasing new studio outtakes and live shows. Dylan's Isle of Wight Festival performance was first bootlegged in 1970 as Isle of Wight, but the concert was incomplete. Eventually, the whole concert was available on illicit albums. Dylan's set at George Harrison's "Concert for Bangladesh" from 1971 soon appeared on bootlegs, such as Madison Square Garden and Bangla Desh, usually paired with part of Harrison's set.

Dylan's 1974 tour with The Band also became a large source of the bootlegs. Mr. Cleen Records released Chicago in 1974, which included 10 songs from Dylan's second Chicago appearance that year. This is probably the first release of material from that tour.

1976 saw the first release of Rolling Thunder Revue material, with Passed Over and Rolling Thunder, a double album that contained a variety of songs. Almost the entire benefit show for Rubin "Hurricane" Carter on December 8, 1975, was released as Hurricane Carter Benefit, by the Singers Label. Bootlegging Dylan continued to be prosperous throughout the rest of the 1970s, 80s, and beyond, with many hundreds of titles released.

Since the 2010s almost all bootleg recordings by Bob Dylan can be found for free on the internet (YouTube).

== Commonly bootlegged recordings ==
=== The Minnesota Hotel Tapes ===
There are three tapes that are commonly referred as the "Minnesota Tapes": the Minnesota party tape, and the two Minnesota hotel tapes. The first was recorded sometime in May 1961, while the last two were recorded in December of that same year. The earliest tape was recorded by Dylan's girlfriend at the time, Bonnie Beecher, while the other two were recorded by friend Tony Glover. Several songs from these tapes appeared on the original Great White Wonder. They have forever been distributed across various bootlegs throughout the years, but the most complete collection was released in 1994 as The Minnesota Tapes. This collection includes both tapes in their entirety, spread across three CDs.

=== Finjan Club, Montreal ===
Months after the release of his first album, Dylan gave five club appearances plus a guest set in Montreal, returning to Greenwich Village with $200 after paying his own travel and staying with locals. The five were at the Pot-pourri on Stanley Street owned by Moishe Feinberg, beginning Thursday, June 28, 1962 and for the next four evenings. The guest set was at the Finjan Club on Victoria Avenue owned by Shimon Ash after the regular show at the Pot-pourri that same night. The entire two-hour Finjan Club set on that Monday evening was recorded on a quality reel-to-reel tape recorder owned by musician Jack Nissenson but the tape remained unreleased until the Yellow Dog CD issue of 1991 entitled Bob Dylan – Live Finjan Club, Montreal Canada, July 2, 1962. Folksinger Anna McGarrigle was in the small audience and recalled, "He was very sloppy looking. He was very pale and he was wearing a white shirt. He looked like a white worm."

Craig Pinkerton writes, "The incredible Finjan tape belongs in every collection.... Nothing is edited here. The CD captures the moment the recorder was turned on and left to run.... The audience is pin drop quiet. So much so that this could be a studio recording. The tape is so clean that several times you can hear the guitar case snaps etc. when the stage hand opens it to retrieve harmonicas and a capo. Turn up the stereo, and suddenly Dylan is in the room with you."

=== The Gaslight Café Recordings ===
Several tapes of Dylan performing at the Gaslight have long been circulating among collectors, although it is not known when the first bootlegs containing them were produced. However, in 2005, Columbia Records released Live at the Gaslight 1962, which contained ten of the seventeen songs from one of these tapes. Dylan originals include "A Hard Rain's A-Gonna Fall", "Don't Think Twice, It's All Right", and an unreleased song called "John Brown".

=== Witmark and Broadside demos ===
When Dylan decided to lodge his compositions with publisher Witmark Music, it became his duty to record demos of his recent compositions. Over 1963–1964, Dylan recorded over forty songs for his publishers, in his publisher's office, usually accompanying himself on piano or guitar. Many songs were never returned to on any of Dylan's albums, such as "The Death of Emmett Till", "All Over You", and "Walkin' Down the Line". A two-CD set compiling the known forty-one of these demos was released in 1994. The complete Witmark demos were officially released by Columbia Records in 2010.

Dylan also recorded songs for the folk magazine Broadside, so they could be transcribed and possibly published. Again, many of these compositions were overlooked when it came time to record an album. 1995 saw the release of many of these songs on a compilation called "Broadside". It also included three songs from a Broadside radio show, and three from the march on Washington D.C.

=== The Newport Folk Festival: 1963–65 ===
Dylan's performances at the 1963, '64, '65, and later 2002 Newport Folk Festival have all been recorded and widely distributed. While being recorded professionally by both cameras and by a PA system during the '60s performances, Dylan's 2002 concert was recorded by an off-mike audience member. The 1965 festival was marked by the fact that he "went electric", much to the chagrin of folk purists. This event's recording circulated long before "Maggie's Farm", the first song played at the concert, along with "Chimes of Freedom" were released on volume seven of the Bootleg Series in 2005. Film of Dylan's conversion to electric music, as well as performances from 1963 and 1964, were released on The Other Side of the Mirror. Dylan's 2002 performance has, to this date, remained unreleased. In 2015, a bootlegged album containing a compilation of audio from The Other Side of the Mirror surfaced on the internet.

=== 1966 World Tour ===
Many of the shows given on Dylan's 1966 World Tour were recorded by audience members, or officially recorded by CBS, which led to a vast archive of concert recordings. The early parts of the tour, taking place in the United States, contained "Positively Fourth Street" and "Love Minus Zero/No Limit", and "To Ramona" in the set list. However, these songs were dropped as Dylan and the Hawks traveled to different locations. The electric portions were usually intense, with Dylan nearly screaming into the microphone. An official release of the long-bootlegged "Royal Albert Hall" concert finally appeared in 1998 as the fourth volume of the Bootleg Series. The entire tour was released by Columbia in a 36 disc box set called The 1966 Live Recordings in 2016.

=== The "Basement Tapes" sessions ===
Dylan and the Band had come to Woodstock in 1967, with the intent to shoot further scenes for the documentary Eat the Document, but their focus soon reverted to music. Using equipment borrowed from Peter, Paul and Mary, Dylan and the Band began to record a vast variety of music in the basement of the Band's rented house, near Woodstock. Over the ensuing months, over 100 songs were recorded, many of them written by Dylan.

For many years, only the heavily edited official version of The Basement Tapes, as well as the release of the song "I'm Not There" to promote the film of the same name, offered a legal alternative to the many bootleg versions of these sessions. Material recorded in these sessions appeared on the original Great White Wonder album, and have been re-appearing ever since on bootlegs. The most complete version was White Bear's A Tree with Roots, which contains 108 tracks from the "Basement" sessions.

The 139 track The Bootleg Series Vol. 11: The Basement Tapes Complete supplanted all actual bootleg releases of the material.

Three songs from these sessions have not surfaced in complete form: "Even if it's a Pig Part I and II" (written by The Band), "Wild Wolf" (Dylan), and "Can I Get a Racehorse?". "Even if it's a Pig Part I" circulates in incomplete form.

=== Never Ending Tour ===
Since 1988, Dylan has toured consistently every year, performing nearly 100 shows every single year. His constant and seemingly ceaseless schedule was dubbed the "Never Ending Tour" by a reporter. A vast number of the shows have been recorded by audience members, and many have been released on bootleg CD. Very few recordings from the tour have been officially released; many have been single songs only, but entire concerts have not been made available to the general public.

== See also ==
- The Bootleg Series, a series of official Dylan releases
