= Hot Wacks =

Hot Wacks is a Canadian book that has been in circulation for over 25 years, featuring reviews of bootleg music releases. Reviews include information such as source, quality, track listing and packaging. It is commonly referred to as the 'Bootleg Bible' by bootleg collectors. Hot Wacks was the work of Kurt Glemser. Before Hot Wacks he wrote two other bootleg discographies - Bootlegs (March, 1973) followed by Underground Sounds (October, 1974).

It was published in Kitchener, Ontario.

Hot Wacks spawned a magazine Hot Wacks Quarterly which also reviewed bootlegs as well as other collectible records (Communist pressings, box sets, etc.) as well as featuring pictorials of female rockers.

Hot Wacks went through 15 printings starting with Hot Wacks Book I (November, 1975) and ending with Book XV: The Last Wacks. The latter was almost 800 pages long. Additional Supplements, numbering 1 - 6 were published after Book version XV.
