= The Swingin' Pig Records =

The Swingin' Pig Records was a bootleg label that mostly released LPs and singles, best known for unauthorized recordings of the Beatles, Led Zeppelin and the Rolling Stones. The first publications were made in the early 1980s, when they released three singles and about twenty LPs. The label became one of the first to release bootleg CDs, the first to offer bootleg CDs in high-quality box sets. A sublabel, Magic Dwarf Records, offered records from the Beatles and Rolling Stones in 1988.

By 1985, the label had its headquarters in Luxembourg and distributed its recordings from Germany via the small record label Perfect Beat Tonträger, in Brakel. By the 1990s, GEMA fees were paid, artists were unable to collect because in some European countries the rights for the artists had expired after 20 or 25 years. The label disappeared from the market in the mid-1990s, around the time WIPO became law. Remaining stocks were processed through Soundhouse Music.

The LP / CD Box Atlantic City '89 was the label's most popular release, a digital recording of a live concert by the Rolling Stones over satellite broadcast. The band tried to ban the publication several times; in 1991 there were several court hearings before the regional court in Hamburg, with distribution was banned for a short time. On March 22, 1991, the regional court lifted the ban. At over 70,000 copies, it may be the best-selling bootleg in the world.

A total of around 250 CDs and 150 LPs were released, as well as three singles and two shape vinyls from the Rolling Stones. A few legitimate authorized promo recordings were released. Most of the LPs were also made on limited-edition colored vinyl.

The following list is an overview of known releases, including the first bootlegs and special pressings. The Swingin 'Pig Records discontinued production with TSP 223–2; any records beyond this are fakes, mostly from Thailand, banking on the name recognition.

Due to the legal situation at the time, artists from countries that did not sign the Rome Agreement were only granted the rights that German artists had in the respective country (principle of reciprocity). In the early 1990s several court cases ruled the unauthorized releases legal. Today, reselling may not be.

Bootlegs

- TSP 45-001 – The Rolling Stones – Slowly Rockin' On
- TSP 45-002 – Keith Richards – Alternate Takes (EP)
- TSP 45-003 – The Rolling Stones – Ain’t It Good To Be Alive
- TSP 001 – The Rolling Stones – Can You Heat The Guitar
- TSP 002 – The Rolling Stones – Unseachable Stones
- TSP 003 – Genesis – Memories of the Giant
- TSP 004 – Bob Dylan – Tunes from the Simple Year
- TSP 005-2 – Pink Floyd – One of These Days
- TSP 006 – The Rolling Stones – Great Lost Live Album Vol. I
- TSP 007 – Keith Richards – Booze & Pills & Powders
- TSP 008 – Bob Dylan – Over the Cliff
- TSP 009 – The Rolling Stones – Sweet Home Chicago
- TSP 010 – Pink Floyd – Fillmore West
- TSP 011 – Neil Young – Computer Age
- TSP 012 – The Rolling Stones – So Much Younger Than Today
- TSP 013 – Bruce Springsteen – Growin' Up Tour Legend
- TSP 014 – Bob Dylan – Nearer to the Fire
- TSP 015 – The Rolling Stones – He is not Dead...!
- TSP 016 – Bob Dylan & Jerry Garcia – The Live Adventures Of
- TSP 017 – Frank Zappa – Freaks & Motherfuckers
- TSP 018-2 – The Rolling Stones – Time Is On Our Side
- TSP 019 – The Rolling Stones – BBC Broadcasts
- TSP 020 – Bruce Springsteen – Rock Through The Jungle

Live records (LP & CD)

- TSP 001 – The Beatles – Ultra Rare Trax Vol. 1
- TSP 002 – The Beatles – Ultra Rare Trax Vol. 2
- TSP 003 – The Rolling Stones – Get Satisfaction... if You Want!
- TSP 004-2 (3-LP-Set) – The Doors – Live in Stockholm 1968
- TSP 005 – The Beatles – Stars of 63
- TSP 006 – The Byrds – Live in Stockholm 1967
- TSP 007 – The Rolling Stones – Conquer America
- TSP 008 – The Beatles – Live Paris 1965
- TSP 009 – Bob Dylan & The Band – Royal Albert Hall 1966
- TSP 010 – The Rolling Stones – Bright Lights Big City
- TSP 011 – The Beatles – Five Nights in a Judo Arena
- TSP 012-2 – Jimi Hendrix – On the Killing Floor
- TSP 013 – Jethro Tull – Nothing is Easy
- TSP 014 – Cream – Stepping Out
- TSP 015-2 – The Beatles – From Us to You
- TSP 016 – Jimi Hendrix – Live in Paris
- TSP 017 – Otis Redding – Satisfaction
- TSP 018 – Jimi Hendrix – Fire
- TSP 019 – Led Zeppelin – White Summer
- TSP 020 – Pink Floyd – The Embryo
- TSP 021-2 – The Who – Live in Amsterdam
- TSP 022 – The Doors – Celebration
- TSP 023-2 – The Rolling Stones – Hyde Park 1969
- TSP 024 – Led Zeppelin – Riverside Blues
- TSP 025 – The Beatles – Ultra Rare Trax Vol. 3
- TSP 026 – The Beatles – Ultra Rare Trax Vol. 4
- TSP 027 – Pink Floyd – Libest Spacement Monitor
- TSP 028 – The Rolling Stones – There's no Angel Born in Hell
- TSP 029 – The Who – American Tour 1973
- TSP 030 – The Rolling Stones – Get Your Leeds Lungs Out!
- TSP 031 – Steppenwolf – Ride with Me
- TSP 032-2 – Crosby, Stills, Nash & Young – Long Time Gone
- TSP 033-2 – The Allman Brothers Band – Statesboro Blues
- TSP 034 – Pink Floyd – One of These Days
- TSP 035 – The Beatles – Ultra Rare Trax Vol. 5
- TSP 036 – The Beatles – Ultra Rare Trax Vol. 6
- TSP 037 – Bruce Springsteen – Smalltown Boy
- TSP 038 – The Rolling Stones – Welcome to New York
- TSP 039 – Rod Stewart & The Faces – Real Good Time
- TSP 040-2 – Genesis – Live in Montreal
- TSP 041-2 – David Bowie – Rock ’n’ Roll Suicide
- TSP 042-2 – Neil Young & Crazy Horse – Winterlong
- TSP 043 – The Rolling Stones – Live’r Than You'll Ever Be
- TSP 044-2 – Led Zeppelin – Trampled Underfoot
- TSP 045 – Derek and the Dominoes – The Miami Sessions
- TSP 046-2 – The Byrds – Live in Amsterdam
- TSP 047-2 – The Doors – The Matrix Tapes
- TSP 048-2 – Bruce Springsteen – Saint in the City
- TSP 049 – Pink Floyd – The Best of Tour 1972
- TSP 050-2 – The Rolling Stones – Philadelphia Special
- TSP 051 – Bruce Springsteen – And the Band Played
- TSP 052 – Pink Floyd – Amsterdam ’69
- TSP 053 – David Bowie – White Light – White Heat
- TSP 054 – Bob Dylan – Manchester Prayer
- TSP 055-2 – Bob Dylan & The Band – Love Songs for America
- TSP 056 – The Rolling Stones – Rocks Off !
- TSP 057 – Bob Dylan – Now Ain’t the Time for Your Tears
- TSP 058 – Lou Reed – Hero & Heroine
- TSP 059-2 – Led Zeppelin – Destroyer
- TSP 060-2 – The Rolling Stones – Philadelphia Special 2
- TSP 061 – Pink Floyd – Welcome to the Machine
- TSP 062 – Jimi Hendrix – Last American Concert Vol. 1
- TSP 063 – Eric Clapton – American Tour ’78
- TSP 064-2 – The Rolling Stones – Out on Bail
- TSP 065-2 – The Police – Bring on the Night
- TSP 066-2 – The New Barbarians – Buried Alive
- TSP 067 – Iggy Pop – Nightclubbing
- TSP 068 – Dire Straits – Once Upon a Time
- TSP 069 – Prince – Jack U Off!
- TSP 070 – The Cure – Play for Today
- TSP 071-2 – Pink Floyd – Live in Montreux 1971
- TSP 072 – Jimi Hendrix – Last American Concert Vol. 2
- TSP 073-2 – Led Zeppelin – Brussels Affair
- TSP 074 – Neil Young – In Concert
- TSP 075-3 – The Rolling Stones – Atlantic City ’89
- TSP 076 – Neil Young – Amsterdam ’89
- TSP 077 – The Sisters of Mercy – Floorshow
- TSP 078-2 – Tom Petty – Straight into Darkness
- TSP 079 – Stevie Ray Vaughan – Last Farewell
- TSP 080-2 – Gary Moore – Back to the Blues
- TSP 081 – Van Morrison – Live in Montreux
- TSP 082 – Jeff Healey Band – In Concert
- TSP 083-2 – The Cramps – Sex & Cramps & Rock ’n’ Roll
- TSP 084-2 – Iggy Pop – Real Wild Child
- TSP 085-2 – Keith Richards – A Stone Alone
- TSP 086-2 – The Cure – Full Moon Concert
- TSP 087 – Midnight Oil – Dreamworld
- TSP 088-2 – Dire Straits – American Tour 1985
- TSP 089 – Bob Marley – Live in Chicago
- TSP 090-2 – Depeche Mode – Performance
- TSP 091 – Little Feat – Back on the Road
- TSP 092 – Eurythmics – In their own Words
- TSP 093 – U2 – Another Time, Another Place
- TSP 094 – Prince – Nightclubbing
- TSP 095 – The Bangles – Live
- TSP 096 – Led Zeppelin – Live in Rotterdam
- TSP 097 – The Police – Reunion Concert 1986
- TSP 098 – The Waterboys – Live at the Zenith
- TSP 099-2 – Neil Young – Prisoners of Rock ’n’ Roll
- TSP 100-2 – The Rolling Stones – Hampton 81
- TSP 101-2 – Aerosmith – Rock this Way
- TSP 102 – Bon Jovi – Dead or Alive
- TSP 103 – Tina Turner – Live in Tokyo
- TSP 104 – The Sisters of Mercy – Live in Amsterdam 1984
- TSP 105 – Sting – Chicago 91
- TSP 106 – Roger McGuinn – Someone to Love
- TSP 107 – Bob Dylan & Tom Petty – True Confessions
- TSP 108 – The Pogues – Live on Rain Street
- TSP 109 – The Smiths – Live in Madrid
- TSP 110 – Pixies – Subbacultcha
- TSP 111 – Iggy Pop – Raw Power 91
- TSP 112-2 – Guns N' Roses – Live... and Let Die
- TSP 113 – Jimmy Page – Midnight Moonlight
- TSP 114 – U2 – Philadelphia Special
- TSP 115-2 – Muddy Waters & The Rolling Stones – Sweet Home Chicago
- TSP 116 – The Police – Many Miles Away
- TSP 117-2 – Dire Straits – European Tour 1992
- TSP 118-2 – Whitesnake – Live in Tokyo
- TSP 119-2 – Roxy Music – Out of the Blue
- TSP 120 – Tracy Chapman – Live
- TSP 121 – Extreme – Flesh and Blood
- TSP 122 – Cinderella – Gypsy Road
- TSP 123 – INXS – Original Sin
- TSP 124 – The Cure – In between Days
- TSP 125 – Santana – Live at Sunrise
- TSP 126-2 – The Rolling Stones – Paris aux Printemps
- TSP 127 – Soup Dragons – Dream-E-Forever
- TSP 128 – Tom Petty – Anyway You Want It
- TSP 129 – Pearl Jam – Live Performance
- TSP 130-2 – Mick Jagger – From Far East to Down Under
- TSP 131 – Rod Stewart – Sweet Little Rock’n Roller
- TSP 132 – Judas Priest – Breaking the Law
- TSP 133 – Chris Isaak – Live in Zurich
- TSP 134 – ZZ Top – Live Nationwide
- TSP 135 – Stevie Ray Vaughan – Live in Montreux
- TSP 136-2 – Little Village – Stage Job
- TSP 137-2 – Grateful Dead – Live in Oakland
- TSP 138-2 – Tin Machine – Heaven's in Here
- TSP 139 – Mink DeVille – Desperate Days
- TSP 141 – Prince – Housequake
- TSP 142 – Nirvana – Live
- TSP 143 – Ozzy Osbourne – Paranoid Man
- TSP 144 – Jethro Tull – Never too Old to Rock ’n’ Roll

Live Records (CD only)

- TSP CD 145 – John Lee Hooker – Mill Valley ’92
- TSP CD 146-2 – Bob Marley – Wake Up and Live
- TSP CD 147-2 – Lou Reed – Power and Glory
- TSP CD 148 – Graham Parker – Blue Highway
- TSP CD 149-2 – Bruce Springsteen – Acoustic Tales
- TSP CD 150-2 – The Rolling Stones – Live in Toronto
- TSP CD 151-2 – The Cure – À L’Olympia 7.6.1982
- TSP CD 152 – The Sisters of Mercy – Live in the Trojan Horse
- TSP CD 153 – Depeche Mode – New Life
- TSP CD 154 – Ron Wood – Pretty Beat Up
- TSP CD 155 – Keith Richards – Toronto ’93
- TSP CD 156-3 – Eric Clapton & Rush – Montreux 86
- TSP CD 157-2 – Bon Jovi – Europe ’93
- TSP CD 158-2 – U2 – Achtung Bootleg
- TSP CD 159-2 – Neil Young – Silver and Gold
- TSP CD 160-2 – Aerosmith – Eat the Rich
- TSP CD 161-2 – R.E.M. – Acoustic
- TSP CD 162 – Héroes del Silencio – Live in Concert
- TSP CD 163 – Pixies – Gone to Heaven
- TSP CD 164 – Pearl Jam – Europe ’93
- TSP CD 165 – Ramones – Back Street Party!
- TSP CD 166 – Stevie Ray Vaughan & Buddy Guy – It's Still Called the Blues
- TSP CD 167 – John Lee Hooker – The Montreux Album
- TSP CD 168 – Buddy Guy – Blues Alive
- TSP CD 169-2 – Neville Brothers – Swiss Moon
- TSP CD 170-2 – Pink Floyd – Live at Winterland
- TSP CD 171 – Motörhead – Deaf Forever
- TSP CD 172 – Nirvana – Live in Seattle ’93
- TSP CD 173 – Rage Against the Machine – Live
- TSP CD 174 – Red Hot Chili Peppers – What Live Album?
- TSP CD 175-2 – Crowded House – Stage Time
- TSP CD 176 – Pink Floyd – Brain Damage
- TSP CD 177-2 – Black Crowes – In Concert 1993
- TSP CD 178 – George Thorogood – Viva Las Vegas
- TSP CD 179 – Izzy Stradlin – Buried Alive
- TSP CD 180-1 – The Rolling Stones – Washington ’94 First Night Stand Vol. 1
- TSP CD 180-2 – The Rolling Stones – Washington ’94 First Night Stand Vol. 2
- TSP CD 181-2 – The Rolling Stones – Live at the Superdome, New Orleans ’94
- TSP CD 182-2 – The Rolling Stones – Live at Joe Robbie Stadium, Miami ’94
- TSP CD 183 – Eric Clapton – The Last Rehearsal
- TSP CD 184 – The Rolling Stones – Shattered in Europe
- TSP CD 185-2 – The Rolling Stones – Live in Johannesburg
- TSP CD 186 – Bruce Springsteen – Live at Max’s Kansas City
- TSP CD 187 – Tom Petty – Live in Gainesville
- TSP CD 188 – Stevie Ray Vaughan – First Concert in Europe
- TSP CD 189 – B. B. King – Live in Montreux
- TSP CD 190-4 – The Rolling Stones – Beast of Belgium
- TSP CD 191 – Mick Jagger – Through the years
- TSP CD 192 – Bon Jovi – Made in Japan
- TSP CD 194 – Nils Lofgren – Back It Up
- TSP CD 195-2 – The Rolling Stones – All Hallow’s Eve
- TSP CD 196-6 – Eric Clapton – Wonderful Tonight
- TSP CD 197-2 – Page & Plant – Live at the Shark Tank
- TSP CD 199 – The Rolling Stones – Lonely at the Top
- TSP CD 200-4 – The Rolling Stones – Handsome Girls
- TSP CD 201-2 – The Rolling Stones – da’Lapa incident & Lisboa ’95
- TSP CD 202-2 – The New Barbarians & The Rolling Stones – Blind Date Revisited
- TSP CD 203 – Ron Wood – Live in Austin
- TSP CD 204 – The New Barbarians – Live at L.A. Forum
- TSP CD 205-3 – Stevie Ray Vaughan – In Memoriam
- TSP CD 206-2 – Black Crowes – Newport 1992
- TSP CD 207 – Bob Marley – Welcome to New York
- TSP CD 208 – Grateful Dead – Live at the Orpheum Theatre
- TSP CD 209 – Lynyrd Skynyrd – Atlanta 1993
- TSP CD 210 – The Rolling Stones (nur CD, ohne Cover)
- TSP CD 211-2 – Patti Smith – Live at CBGB’s
- TSP CD 212 – Iggy Pop – The Complete Channel Tapes
- TSP CD 213 – Johnny Winter – Woodstock Revival
- TSP CD 214 – The Rolling Stones – San Diego 1969
- TSP CD 215 – The Rolling Stones – Get Your Leeds Lungs Out! – Revisited
- TSP CD 217 – The Byrds – Doin’ Alright for Old People
- TSP CD 218 – Slade – Live in London
- TSP CD 219-2 – Eric Burdon & The Animals – Live in Poughkeepsie
- TSP CD 220-2 – Jimi Hendrix – Live in Copenhagen 1968/70
- TSP CD 221-2 – David Bowie – Serious Moonlight
- TSP CD 222-2 – U2 – The Complete Boston '83 Tapes
- TSP CD 223-2 – The Cure – Cold

Special releases (LP & CD)

- TSP 7 001 – The Rolling Stones – Sad Sad Sad/Ruby Tuesday (Single, durchsichtig)
- TSP CD 001 – The Beatles – Ultra Rare Trax Vol. 1 (CD Rotes Cover, nur in Japan erschienen)
- TSP CD 001 – The Beatles – Ultra Rare Trax Vol. 2 (CD Rotes Cover, nur in Japan erschienen)
- PB 006-2 – Ron Wood – Sure the One You Need (Nur LP)
- TSP 003 SH – The Rolling Stones – Roll Over Beethoven (Shape-Single, B-Seite: Come On und Down the Road Apiece)
- TSP 007 SH – The Rolling Stones – Time Is on My Side (Shape-Single, B-Seite: Little Red Rooster und Everybody Needs Somebody to Love)

Promo releases (LP & CD)

- TSP 001 – Various – A Slice of Swingin’ Pig Vol. 1
- TSP 001 – Various – A Slice of Swingin’ Pig Vol. 2
- TSP PRO 7 001 – The Rolling Stones – Sad Sad Sad/Ruby Tuesday
- TSP CD BLBC – The Rolling Stones – Bright Lights-Big City
- TSP CD PRO 001 – Various – A Slice of Swingin’ Pig Vol. 1
- TSP CD PRO 002 – Various – A Slice of Swingin’ Pig Vol. 2
- TSP CD PRO 003 – Various – A Slice of Swingin’ Pig Vol. 3
- TSP CD RSAMC – The Rolling Stones – At the Marquee Club
- TSP CD SB-2 – The Rolling Stones – Basel ’90
- TSP CDS 001 – The Rolling Stones – IBC Demos 1963
- TSP CDS 002 – The Rolling Stones – Chess Chicago Outtakes 1964
- TSP CDS 003 – The Rolling Stones – Cops and Robbers
- TSP CDS 004 – The Rolling Stones – Camden Theatre 1964
- TSP CDS 005 – The Doors with Eddie Vedder
- TSP CDS 006 – Pearl Jam – The Live Cover E.P.

Magic Dwarf Records

- K & S 072 – Rolling Stones – The Trident Mixes (LP)
- MDR-1 – Rolling Stones – The Riot Show / Berlin 1965 (LP)
- MDR-2 – Rolling Stones – Pollwinner’s Concert 1964 & 65 (LP)
- MDR-3 – Rolling Stones – A L’Olympia 1966 (LP)
- MDR-4 – Rolling Stones – A L’Olympia 1967 (LP)
- MDR-5 – Rolling Stones – Brian We Miss You (LP)
- MDR-6 – Rolling Stones – Meet Me In The Bottom (LP)
- MDR 45-1 – Beatles – Northern Songs (7-inch, EP)
- MDR 45-2 – Rolling Stones – Majestic Beginning (Shape-Single 7-inch EP)
