= More Golden Eggs =

Compilation album (bootleg) by The Yardbirds
- Released: 1975
- Recorded: 1964–1967
- Genre: Rock, R&B
- Label: Trademark of Quality
- Producer: Various

Professional ratings
Review scores
Source	Rating
Allmusic	3/5 stars

More Golden Eggs is a bootleg recording of the English rock group The Yardbirds, released by Trademark of Quality (TMQ). It is the follow-up to their earlier album, Golden Eggs, and again consisted of previously released material, along with recordings from television broadcasts and some solo singles. As well as having a cover designed by William Stout, like several TMQ releases, it was the first bootleg to be notably endorsed by the original artist, as the cover featured an interview with singer Keith Relf.

== Background ==
Following the success of Golden Eggs, TMQ decided to create a sequel. This time, rather than focusing only on more obscure material, the compilation included several of their most successful singles. However, it also contained two takes of "I Wish You Would", featuring Eric Clapton, the B-side to "Happenings Ten Years Time Ago", "Psycho Daisies", two versions of the second Relf solo single, "Shapes In My Mind", and a Jimmy Page solo single, "She Just Satisfies".

== Cover ==
The cover artwork was, like the previous volume, drawn by William Stout, who had been a fan of The Yardbirds. He created the cover in the style of British Illustrator Arthur Rackham, who he had been influenced by as a child. At the time, he was living near Relf, who was in the process of forming a new band, Armageddon, and needed rent money. In exchange for paying this, Stout conducted an interview with Relf, playing him the various songs on the album and recording his thoughts. These were subsequently printed on the back cover and on a 6-page insert.

== Track listing ==
Side one
No.	Title	Length
1.	"Psycho Daisies"
2.	"Shapes In My Mind - I"
3.	"I Wish You Would"
4.	"Keep Moving"
5.	"I'm A Man"
6.	"Blue Sands"
7.	"She Just Satisfies"
8.	"Hang On Sloopy"

Side two
No.	Title	Length
9.	"Paff...Bum"
10.	"Heart Full Of Soul"
11.	"Shapes In My Mind - II"
12.	"Shapes Of Things"
13.	"For Your Love"
14.	"I Wish You Would"
15.	"Questa Volta"
16.	"Glimpses"
