= Jack Nissenson =

Jack Nissenson (February 10, 1933 – June 24, 2015) was a Canadian folk musician who was a member of the group Mountain City Four, based in Montreal, Quebec, Canada, and active in the 1960s. In addition to Nissenson, the group consisted of Peter Weldon, Kate McGarrigle, and Anna McGarrigle.

== Life and career ==
Nissenson was born on February 10, 1933.

Before the Mountain City Four, Peter Weldon and Jack Nissenson were members of a traditional folk band called Pharisees. When Weldon and Nissenson met the McGarrigle sisters, they formed the Mountain City Four.

Nissenson recorded an early concert performed by Bob Dylan at the Finjan Club on Victoria Street in Montreal in July 1962. He made the recording with an old British-made reel-to-reel tape recorder, so the quality of the recording is exceptional. This recording remains as one of the most sought-after early recordings of Bob Dylan with collectors and fans.

Nissenson moved to Toronto, Ontario, in 1975. During the late 1970s and 1980s, he sang and played guitar with a political folk group in Toronto called Bread and Roses.

Upon returning to Montreal, Nissenson continued to play folk music for many years as a solo singer and with a group named "The What Four" (with Peter Weldon, Marvin Segal, John Knowles, and often Jane McGarrigle). He was also an accomplished storyteller and belonged to a group called Word of Mouth Productions with storytellers Dylan Spevack-Willcock, Sarah Comrie, and John David Hickey.

Nissenson died in Montreal on June 24, 2015, at the age of 82.

== Sources ==
- "Kate & Anna McGarrigle" Folk & Blues: An Encyclopedia, St. Martin's Press, 2001
