= Cadillac Ranch (disambiguation) =

Cadillac Ranch is a 1974 outdoor sculpture built of Cadillac cars in Amarillo, Texas.

Cadillac Ranch may also refer to:

- "Cadillac Ranch" (Bruce Springsteen song), 1980
- "Cadillac Ranch" (Chris LeDoux song), 1992
- Cadillac Ranch (film), a 1996 film produced by Chip Duncan
