= National Geographic Dinosaurs =

2001 book by Paul Barrett

- Author: Paul Barrett
- Cover artist: Raúl Martín
- Language: English
- Genre: Reference encyclopedia
- Publisher: National Geographic
- Publication date: 2001
- Pages: 192
- ISBN: 0-7922-8224-8
- OCLC: 45243209
- Dewey Decimal: 567.9 21
- LC Class: QE861.5 .B37 2001

National Geographic Dinosaurs is a nonfiction reference book on dinosaurs, written by Paul Barrett, with illustrations by Raúl Martín, and an introduction by Kevin Padian. It was published in 2001 by National Geographic.

== Animals featured ==
=== Dinosaurs ===
- Achelousaurus
- Albertosaurus
- Allosaurus
- Altispinax (mentioned)
- Anchisaurus (briefly identified by its synonym Ammosaurus)
- Ankylosaurus
- Apatosaurus
- Aragosaurus
- Archaeopteryx
- Argentinosaurus (mentioned)
- Atlascopcosaurus
- Baptornis
- Baryonyx
- Beipiaosaurus (mentioned)
- Brachiosaurus
- Camarasaurus
- Camptosaurus
- Carcharodontosaurus
- Carnotaurus
- Caudipteryx
- Centrosaurus
- Ceratosaurus
- Cetiosaurus (mentioned)
- Chasmosaurus
- Coelophysis
- Compsognathus
- Concornis (mentioned)
- Corythosaurus
- Deinocheirus (unidentified)
- Deinonychus
- Dilophosaurus
- Diplodocus carnegii
- Diplodocus hallorum (mentioned, identified as its synonym Seismosaurus)
- Dromaeosaurus
- Dryosaurus
- Edmontonia
- Edmontosaurus
- Einiosaurus
- Eoalulavis (mentioned)
- Eoraptor
- Erlikosaurus (mentioned)
- Euoplocephalus
- Gallimimus
- Giganotosaurus (mentioned)
- Giraffatitan (identified as its synonym Brachiosaurus brancai)
- Herrerasaurus
- Hesperornis (mentioned)
- Hylaeosaurus
- Hypsilophodon
- Iberomesornis
- Iguanodon
- Kentrosaurus
- Lambeosaurus
- Leptoceratops
- Lesothosaurus
- Lusotitan (identified by its synonym Brachiosaurus atalaiensis)
- Magnosaurus (mentioned)
- Maiasaura
- Megalosaurus (mentioned)
- Monoclonius
- Mussaurus (mentioned)
- Omeisaurus (mentioned)
- Ornithomimus
- Ouranosaurus
- Oviraptor
- Pachycephalosaurus
- Pachyrhinosaurus
- Parasaurolophus
- Patagosaurus
- Pelecanimimus
- Pentaceratops (mentioned)
- Piatnitzkysaurus
- Plateosaurus
- Protarchaeopteryx (mentioned)
- Protoceratops
- Psittacosaurus
- Rebbachisaurus (mentioned)
- Saltasaurus
- Saurornitholestes
- Scelidosaurus
- Scutellosaurus (mentioned)
- Segnosaurus (mentioned)
- Sinornithosaurus (mentioned)
- Sinosauropteryx
- Spinosaurus (mentioned)
- Stegosaurus
- Struthiomimus
- Styracosaurus
- Tarbosaurus (mentioned)
- Tenontosaurus
- Thecodontosaurus (mentioned)
- Therizinosaurus
- Triceratops
- Troodon
- Tyrannosaurus
- Velociraptor

=== Non-dinosaurs ===
- Bernissartia
- Eudibamus (mentioned)
- Lagerpeton (mentioned)
- Lagosuchus
- Lepidotes
- Liopleurodon (mentioned)
- Marasuchus (mentioned)
- Morganucodon (mentioned)
- Nautilus
- Quetzalcoatlus
