= The Dinosaurs (1981 book) =

1981 book by Byron Preiss

The Dinosaurs: A Fantastic New View of a Lost Era
- Editor: Byron Preiss
- Illustrator: William Stout
- Genre: Science
- Publisher: Bantam Books
- Publication date: 1981

The Dinosaurs: A Fantastic New View of a Lost Era is a book published by Bantam Books in 1981.

== Contents ==
The Dinosaurs is a 150-page book edited by Byron Preiss, narrated by William Service, illustrated by William Stout; and introduced by Peter Dodson. The book gives an overview of new theories (at the time) of dinosaur life, including their social groupings, stages of life, travel, food, appearance and physiology. The book includes 70 full-colour plates and many black and white illustrations.

== Reception ==
John Corr for The Philadelphia Inquirer said that "This vividly illustrated book attempts to give the reader a closeup look at the daily lives of the massive beasts of the dinosaur period on earth. It combines the work of a fantasy artist and a natural history writer; the final work is edited by paleontologist Byron Preiss."

In the November 1981 edition of Dragon (Issue #55), Chris Henderson called it "a truly remarkable look at one of mankind's favorite subjects." Henderson especially admired the artwork of William Stout, saying that his "fantastic art" is what makes the book "distinctive and very desirable [...] perhaps the ultimate dinosaur book." Henderson admitted that this was not a deep scholarly work, noting that over half of the book was illustrations. But he called it "an excellent introduction to most of what is known about dinosaurs today."

Jim Buie reviewed the book for The News & Observer and said that "William Service spent 18 months tripping through time, traveling in his mind to an era when 10-ton brontosaurs and 30-foot hadrosaurs ruled the Earth. Isolated at his seven-acre farm near Efland in Orange County, Service buried himself in books and paleontological research about the Mesozoic era, which spanned from 235 million to 63 million years ago. Then he wrote a colorful, concise text to accompany dramatic illustrations by fantasy artist William Stout."

In The Boston Phoenix, Don Lessem noted that the book's creators "organized a wealth of dinosaur data — much of it fresh scientific speculation of sociality, warfare, and anatomy — in a clever manner. Instead of a dramatis personae of species, The Dinosaurs uses its beasts to illustrate climate, daily life, movement, danger, even extinction."

Leslie Hanscom reviewed the book for the Vancouver Sun and said that "The special interest of The Dinosaurs is that it goes into the matter of behavior and, shall we say, lifestyle. William Service, hitherto known for Owl, a much-admired naturalist study, contributes a narrative that gives a plausible reconstruction of how the dinosaurs passed their time until they disappeared 63 million years ago, just as small mammals were beginning to enter Creation."

Tom Murphy for the Messenger-Inquirer reviewed the book and said that "Unlike most books about the ancient beasts, "The Dinosaurs" is more than a textbook crammed with facts. It is a glimpse at private moments that passed millions of years ago. [...] Though the tales are filled with enough information to satisfy a college paleontology class, they are pleasant enough to serve as bedtime stories. The stunning illustrations were changed repeatedly to reflect scientific fact. [...] The facts were checked by an expert, Peter Dodson of the University of Pennsylvania, who also wrote the introduction and the scientific commentary."

Barbara Varro for The Manhattan Mercury wrote in 1982 that "Interest in dinosaurs has been rekindled recently with the publication of such books as The Dinosaurs: A Fantastic New View of a Lost Era [...] The book, touted as a book for both adults and children, features illustrations in a fanciful art nouveau style by William Stout with text by natural history writer William Service."

== Reviews ==
- Review by Joseph Nicholas (1981) in Vector 105
- Review by Charles Platt (1982) in The Patchin Review, Number Three
- Review by Gene DeWeese (1982) in Science Fiction Review, Spring 1982
- Review by Baird Searles (1982) in Isaac Asimov's Science Fiction Magazine, April 1982
- Review by L. Sprague de Camp (1982) in Amra V2n71, July 1982
- Review by John DiPrete (1983) in Argonaut, Fall 1983
- Cumming Jr., George M.A.; Brown, Ron (February 1982). "The Dinosaurs (Book Review)". School Library Journal. Vol. 28, no. 6. p. 97. EBSCOhost 5715013.

== See also ==
- A Field Guide to Dinosaurs
