= William Stout =

American painter

- Stout at Dragon Con in 2026
- Born: September 18, 1949 (age 76); Salt Lake City, Utah, U.S.
- Education: Chouinard Art Institute/California Institute of the Arts
- Known for: Painting, Illustration, Entertainment Design
- Movement: Paleoart
- Awards: full list

William Stout (born September 18, 1949) is an American fantasy artist and illustrator with a specialization in paleontological art. His paintings have been shown in over seventy exhibitions, including twelve one-man shows. He has worked on over thirty feature films, doing everything from storyboard art to production design. He has designed theme parks and has worked in radio with the Firesign Theatre.

== Biography ==
=== Comics and music industry ===
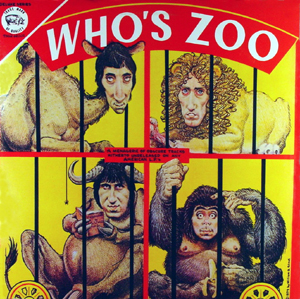
Who's Zoo, a bootleg recording of The Who with cover artwork by William Stout.

In 1973 Stout began drawing album covers for the Trademark of Quality bootleg record label. He created 42 sleeves for the label and its subsidiaries, including the Rolling Stones' All-Meat Music (his first), the Yardbirds' Golden Eggs and More Golden Eggs, and the Who's Who's Zoo and Tales from the Who. He became associated with the Firesign Theatre, and designed his first official album cover, In the Next World, You're on Your Own, in 1974.

From 1975 to 1977 Stout worked as art director for the rock magazine Bomp! During this time, he became one of the first American contributors to Heavy Metal magazine. He continued to work occasionally designing posters and album sleeves. These included the poster for Rock 'n' Roll High School featuring the Ramones in 1979, the controversial cover for the compilation album Beatlesongs in 1981, and the cover for The Smithereens Play Tommy in 2009.

=== Film and television ===
In 1977 Stout painted his first movie poster, for Ralph Bakshi's film Wizards. During his career, Stout has worked on the advertising for over 120 films.

In 1978, with Buck Rogers, Stout began his film production design career. In the late 1970s and early 1980s, Stout and fellow illustrator Richard Hescox ran a Los Angeles art studio, working on such projects as the storyboards for Raiders of the Lost Ark and pop singer Michael Jackson's video Thriller. Fellow cartoonist Dave Stevens worked for a time in the same studio.

Stout has worked on over thirty feature films, including both 1980s Conan films, First Blood, The Hitcher, and Invaders from Mars. He was also the production designer of the Masters of the Universe film.

Stout illustrated the poster art and wrote the story (and the first draft of the script) of the film The Warrior and the Sorceress for Roger Corman, as well as writing a never-produced dinosaur feature for Jim Henson. For Industrial Light & Magic in 1996, he designed "Edgar", the big bug in Men in Black. Stout was the key character designer for the animated feature Dinosaur (released in 2000). Stout worked as the conceptual designer for The Muppets' Wizard of Oz, and key designer for Guillermo del Toro's Pan's Labyrinth. Recent film work includes Christopher Nolan's film The Prestige and creature design for Frank Darabont's and Stephen King's The Mist. He is slated to work on del Toro's At the Mountains of Madness as well as a proposed John Carter of Mars film.

=== Paleontological art ===
In 1981 Bantam Books published Stout's landmark masterwork The Dinosaurs: A Fantastic New View of a Lost Era (recently updated and re-published as The New Dinosaurs). In 1983, Stout was among those who illustrated Ray Bradbury's Dinosaur Tales. In 1984 he illustrated The Little Blue Brontosaurus, which was a 1984 Children's Choice Award recipient and the basis for the 1988 animated feature The Land Before Time.

In 1986, as a result of his paleontological reconstruction work, eleven Stout paintings were selected for inclusion in the traveling exhibition "Dinosaurs Past and Present," an important group show depicting the history of paleoart. The six-year tour included (among others) the Smithsonian Institution, British Museum, the Royal Ontario Museum, and the American Museum of Natural History.

In 1993, Universal Cartoon Studios chose Stout to design a prime-time animated series of Jurassic Park, which was ultimately shelved.

Also in 1993 Comic Images released William Stout's Lost Worlds, the first of three trading card sets.

==== Antarctica ====
In January 1989, Stout traveled to Antarctica and Patagonia. His experiences there eventually resulted in the one-man show "Dinosaurs, Penguins and Whales — The Wildlife of Antarctica." The exhibition was part of Stout's effort to alert and inform the public of the complex beauty of Antarctica, and to work as part of the international effort to make Antarctica the first "World Park." "Dinosaurs, Penguins and Whales" evolved into a forthcoming book, Lost Worlds: Modern and Prehistoric Life in Antarctica, the first visual overview of life in Antarctica.

In August 1991 Stout received a grant from the National Science Foundation to participate in their Antarctic Artists and Writers Program. For three months during the 1992-1993 austral summer, Stout was based at McMurdo Station and Palmer Station. He made several dives beneath the ice, climbed the active volcano Mount Erebus, camped in the dry valleys, and produced over one hundred painted studies as he carefully observed Antarctica's wildlife. Shortly thereafter, Stout drove over one thousand miles through central southern Chile, documenting the rare prehistoric forests there for inclusion in his Lost Worlds book.

==== Murals ====
In 1994 Stout painted two murals for the Houston Museum of Natural Science depicting "Life Before The Dinosaurs." In early 1998 Stout completed three Cretaceous murals and supervised two full-sized dinosaur sculptures for Disney's Animal Kingdom.

In 2007, Stout completed twelve large murals depicting the prehistoric life of San Diego for the San Diego Natural History Museum.

In addition, Stout's murals and paintings are on permanent display at the Houston Museum of Natural Science, the Orton Geological Museum, The Museum of the Rockies, and the North Carolina Museum of Natural Sciences.

=== Entertainment design ===
Beginning in 1987, Stout worked for Walt Disney Imagineering for a year and a half as a conceptualist, designer, and producer for Euro Disneyland, Disneyland, Tokyo Disneyland, and Walt Disney World. In 1989 he was hired by Lucasfilm/Industrial Light and Magic as conceptualist and chief designer for their first foray into themed entertainment centers. In 1991 Stout conceived and designed ZZ Top's Recycler tour. In 1994 Stout continued theme park attraction creation and design for MCA/Universal's Islands of Adventure. In late 1995, Steven Spielberg chose Stout as his senior concept designer for GameWorks, a Sega/Universal/DreamWorks SKG joint project. For two years Stout and his team oversaw the concepts, design, and execution of the first three GameWorks facilities in Seattle, Washington; Tempe, Arizona; and Ontario, California). Stout worked in 1998-1999 as the lead designer for Kansas City's Wonderful World of Oz theme park (which never opened). He was also a designer for Michael Jackson's private Neverland Ranch theme park.

=== Illustration ===
In 2001, Stout illustrated Richard Matheson's first children's book, Abu and the 7 Marvels, which won many awards. The Stout-illustrated book The Emerald Wand of Oz was released in 2005, followed by Trouble Under Oz in 2006. Stout's own publishing company, Terra Nova Press, has published thirty-four books on art and the history of art.

In 2013, he prepared and illustrated Legends of the Blues, a book comprising portraits of classic blues musicians, intended as a sequel to fellow cartoonist Robert Crumb's book Heroes of Blues, Jazz and Country.

== Influences ==
On his website, Stout lists the following influences:

- Painting: Frank Frazetta, Thomas Moran, Norman Rockwell, Charles R. Knight, Stanley Meltzoff, Carl Evers
- Comics: Harvey Kurtzman, Alex Toth, Russ Manning, Robert Crumb, Wally Wood, Will Eisner, Hal Foster, Al Williamson, Robert Williams, Will Elder, Frazetta, Jean Giraud, Roy G. Krenkel, Franklin Booth, Arthur Rackham, Rick Griffin, Jim Evans, Gaspar Saladino
- Design: Alphonse Mucha, J. C. Leyendecker, Ron Cobb, Ludwig Hohlwein, Hokusai, Yoshitoshi, Maynard Dixon
- Color: Mucha, Edwin Austin Abbey, Yoshida Hiroshi, "most of the other great Japanese print artists," N. C. Wyeth, Frazetta, Giraud, Kurtzman, Edmund Dulac
- Watercolor: Harry Rountree, Frazetta, Moran, Edward Detmold, Alberto Vargas, Jack Davis
- Wildlife painting: Bob Kuhn, Bruno Liljefors, Robert Lougheed, Robert Bateman, Hokusai, Hiroshige, Knight

== Personal life ==
In 1993 Stout was invited to join the California Art Club. He served for years as a member of their executive board, and is currently on their advisory board. Stout was unanimously voted a signature member in 1997.

William Stout resides in Pasadena, California, with his wife; they have two adult sons.

== Exhibitions (selected) ==
- "The Prehistoric World of William Stout", 1977.
- "Dinosaurs, Penguins and Whales: The Wildlife of Antarctica", 1991–1995 — inspired by the three months Stout spent in Antarctica, shown in Moscow at the personal request of then-President Mikhail Gorbachev.
- "Studies From Gondwana - Landscapes and Wildlife of Antarctica," 1993
- "William Stout - Lost Worlds," 1994
- "William Stout's Visions of Gondwana - Past and Present Life in Antarctica," 1995
- "Dinosaurs On Ice - William Stout's Antarctica," 1997
- "Dinosaurs, Penguins & Whales: William Stout's Antarctica," 1999 — Stout's largest (55 paintings) show to date; held at the Muckenthaler Cultural Center in Fullerton, California

== Awards ==
- Inkpot Award, 1978
- Children's Choice Award (The Little Blue Brontosaurus), 1984
- Society of Illustrators, Gold and Silver Medals (Abu & The 7 Marvels), 2002
- Benjamin Franklin Award, Best Young Adult Book (Abu & The 7 Marvels), 2002
- Bram Stoker Award nominee (Abu & The 7 Marvels), 2002
- Chesley Award nominee (Abu & The 7 Marvels), 2002
- Society of Illustrators Silver Medal (Tanagra Theatre poster), 2004
- Spectrum Silver Award (Tanagra Theatre poster), 2004
- Society of Illustrators Silver Medal (Cricket magazine cover), 2004
- Spectrum Gold Award, 2006
