= Trademark of Quality =

Bootleg record label

Trademark of Quality, also spelled as Trade Mark of Quality (abbreviated TMOQ or TMQ), was a bootleg record label based in Los Angeles, California, United States, during the late 1960s and early 1970s. The label was responsible for many underground records of Bob Dylan, Pink Floyd, Led Zeppelin, Jefferson Airplane, Devo, Grateful Dead, The Beatles, Frank Zappa, The Rolling Stones, The Who and many other rock artists of the era.

Trade Mark of Quality was established in 1970 by "Dub" Taylor and Ken Douglas. They were quality-conscious perfectionists who pressed many of their albums on colored, virgin vinyl, and possibly the first bootleggers to start producing printed picture covers, and later color picture covers, rather than paper inserts. Taylor and Douglas had released several albums under different names before settling on "Trade Mark of Quality" in 1969, the first being Great White Wonder by Bob Dylan. According to Douglas, Taylor recorded several of TMOQ's releases himself, including the Rolling Stones' Live'r Than You'll Ever Be and Led Zeppelin's Live On Blueberry Hill. TMOQ frequently released its albums with cover art by William Stout.

== History ==
First generation releases are known as TMOQ or "farm pig" and were released by Taylor and Douglas. The first pressings had big number 1/2/3/4 labels and later pressings had different variations of the "farm pig" label. An unknown number of titles had "Made In Holland" printed on the labels, because – according to the book Great White Wonders – of the liberal laws in Holland. These copies were then exported to Europe. All TMOQ albums initially had blank generic jackets with rubber stamped title, TMOQ stickers in silver, gold and various other colors with records pressed on black or colored vinyl when available. Most, but not all albums, had a back insert.

Second generation releases came after Taylor and Douglas split their partnership and began a "friendly competition". Douglas released titles on his own TMOQ, also known as the "Smoking Pig" label, before establishing The Amazing Kornyfone Record Label (TAKRL) with a new partner. An arrangement with the pressing plant allowed him use of Taylor's TMOQ stampers to press his own copies of Taylor's records along with his own new releases. His releases were a mix of CV and black vinyl pressings and had front inserts (usually the same as the old TMOQ back inserts but now with the TMOQ logo). Between 1973 and 1974, a number of titles were released without catalog numbers and can only be identified by the matrix numbers.

In 1973, Taylor and Douglas met art student William Stout, who expressed an interest in designing their album covers; his first being the Rolling Stones' Winter Tour 1973 double album. Stout subsequently designed all the TMOQ cartoon covers in his unique style. The most famous is probably The Rolling Stones' Welcome to New York in 1973 which was also the label's first printed deluxe cover. Asked about his favorite TMOQ artwork, Stout said: "Welcome to New York, with Paul McCartney and Wings' Great Dane a close second. There were so many good Stones covers because the Stones had a great, fully realised image to play with. And bootleggers loved the Stones, so they put out many more Stones LPs compared to ones by other groups." Stout's last ones were in 1976 when TMOQ released six albums in its deluxe series.
