= Sonny Boy Williamson and the Yardbirds =

Sonny Boy Williamson & the Yardbirds

Live album by Sonny Boy Williamson and the Yardbirds
- Released: 7 January 1966
- Recorded: 8 December 1963
- Venue: Crawdaddy Club, Richmond
- Genre: Blues
- Length: 34:03
- Label: Fontana
- Producer: Horst Lippmann, Giorgio Gomelsky

Sonny Boy Williamson II chronology
The Real Folk Blues (1966)	Sonny Boy Williamson & the Yardbirds (1966)	More Real Folk Blues (1967)

The Yardbirds UK chronology
Five Live Yardbirds (1964)	Sonny Boy Williamson & the Yardbirds (1966)	Yardbirds (1966)

The Yardbirds US chronology
Having a Rave Up with the Yardbirds (1965)	Sonny Boy Williamson & the Yardbirds (1966)	Over Under Sideways Down (1966)

Sonny Boy Williamson & the Yardbirds is a live album by Chicago blues veteran Sonny Boy Williamson II backed by English rock band the Yardbirds. It was recorded at the Crawdaddy Club in Richmond, Surrey on 8 December 1963. However, the performances were not released until early 1966, after a string of Top 40 hits by the Yardbirds.

Williamson sings and/or plays the harmonica on all of the songs. Although they are in a supporting role, the album also presents some of the earliest recordings by the Yardbirds, whose members included Eric Clapton on lead guitar. Numerous reissues have appeared over the years, sometimes with additional tracks recorded around the same time.

== Background ==
German music impresarios Horst Lippmann and Fritz Rau organized the first annual American Folk Blues Festival in 1962. (Note: "Folk Blues" is something of a misnomer – many of the artists were associated with urban or electric blues, rather than folk or country blues.) They arranged for several well-known American blues artists to perform in concert in several European cities. Sonny Boy Williamson participated during the second festival tour in 1963 and his performances are identified as some of the most memorable of the festival. At the conclusion of the festival, he returned to England for a more extensive club tour.

The Yardbirds' manager, Giorgio Gomelsky, who promoted some of the early American Folk Blues Festivals in England, persuaded Lippmann to attend one of the group's shows (by another account, Williamson also saw one of their performances). A deal was struck and the Yardbirds backed Williamson for several English dates between December 1963 and February 1964. Part of the arrangement included that Lippmann and Rau record some live performances (as they had done for the festival tour) and finance a solo studio demo by the group. (Note: Before they signed to a record contract, the Animals also backed Williamson; a live album recorded on 30 December 1963, was later released.)

At their first meeting, Clapton wanted to impress Williamson with his familiarity with American blues and asked "Isn't your real name Rice Miller?" The Yardbirds had been performing "Good Morning Little Schoolgirl", which is often attributed to John Lee Williamson, also known as "Sonny Boy Williamson I"; "Rice Miller" is one of several names associated with "Sonny Boy Williamson II"). According to Clapton, Williamson "slowly pulled out a small penknife and glared at me. It went downhill from there".

Williamson and the group rehearsed for their upcoming club performances and prepared a set list. Yardbirds' rhythm guitarist Chris Dreja recalled:

We spent a very cold afternoon in the club working out stops, breaks, numbers and tempos. Then we recorded that night with Sonny Boy getting more and more pissed [drunk on Scotch whiskey that he carried with him]. When we got on stage it was nothing like the rehearsal, so none of the songs on the album have the band starting or finishing at the same time.

== Recording ==
7 December 1963 at the Star Hotel, Croydon
Gomelsky indicates that two songs were recorded; however, Yardbirds' chronicler Gregg Russo notes that this was a rehearsal and that attendees have stated that the only recordings took place the following night.

Sonny Boy Williamson backed by the Yardbirds:
- "Take It Easy Baby" (version 1)
- "Do the Weston" (version 1)

8 December 1963 at the Crawdaddy Club, Richmond

The Yardbirds (without Williamson):
- "Smokestack Lightning"
- "Let It Rock"
- "Honey in Your Hips"
- "I Wish You Would"
- "You Can't Judge a Book by Its Cover"
- "Who Do You Love?"

Williamson (solo):
- "Baby Don't Worry"
- "I Don't Care No More"

Williamson backed by the Yardbirds:
- "Bye Bye Bird"
- "Mister Downchild"
- "The River Rhine"
- "23 Hours Too Long"
- "A Lost Care"
- "Pontiac Blues"
- "Take It Easy Baby" (version 2)
- "Out on the Water Coast"
- "Western Arizona" a.k.a. "Do the Weston" (version 2)

28 February 1964 at the Birmingham Town Hall

Williamson backed by the Yardbirds:
- "Slow Walk" (only the last minute of the performance survives – it has the same instrumental backing as "The River Rhine")
- "Highway 49" a.k.a. "Pontiac Blues"
- "My Little Cabin"

Williamson (solo):
- "Bye Bye Bird"

== Releases ==
Over two years after it was recorded, Sonny Boy Williamson & the Yardbirds was first released in the UK by Fontana Records on 7 January 1966. With a somewhat different running order, it was released in the US a month later by Mercury Records on 7 February 1966. The album coincided with a string of successful singles by the Yardbirds, that led music critic Richie Unterberger to label it "an exploitative album". Although Williamson's photo and name were prominently displayed on the album cover, a more recent photo of the Yardbirds with Jeff Beck (who replaced Clapton in March 1965) in the foreground was used. In Germany, the album was released by Star-Club Records, that had a connection to Lippmann and Rau. (Note: It is unclear what, if any, connection existed between the Star-Club in Hamburg, Germany, and Star-Club Records. The Mercury release included "Imported from Star-Club Germany" on both the front and back album covers.)

== Critical reception ==
Professional ratings
Review scores
Source	Rating
AllMusic	3/5 stars

In a retrospective review for AllMusic, Unterberger gave the album three out of five stars. He notes that Sonny Boy Williamson sings well and that the album should be seen as a Williamson release "in the manner of the sides the Beatles cut in Hamburg supporting Tony Sheridan." He describes the Yardbirds' and Clapton's playing as "extremely green" and "tentative". The album did not appear on the record charts in the UK or US.

David French, in his biography of Yardbirds' singer Keith Relf, had a more negative view of the Yardbirds' performance:

the band [were] giving it their best but sounding extremely tentative behind Williamson (generally coming in one member at a time as each song begins). If anything, the recording illustrates the divide between real American blues and the thinned down and revved up version the British R&B bands had evolved ... as Williamson apparently summed up to Robbie Robertson of the Band, "I played with this British band over there, and they wanted to play the blues so bad ... and they really did play them so bad!" (Note: The Animals had a similar experience backing Williamson; Robertson did not specify which group, but the quote is often associated with the Yardbirds.)

== Track listing ==
Original Fontana album

The songwriter credits are taken from the 1966 Fontana release, which indicates that all songs are written by Sonny Boy Williamson II, except as noted. The album does not include running times.

Side 1

1. "Bye Bye Bird" (Willie Dixon, Williamson)
2. "Mister Downchild"
3. "23 Hours Too Long"
4. "Out on the Water Coast"
5. "Baby Don't Worry"

Side 2

1. "Pontiac Blues"
2. "Take It Easy Baby"
3. "I Don't Care No More"
4. "Do the Weston"

Original Mercury album

The running times are taken from the 1966 Mercury release. The liner notes include "All selection composed by Sonny Boy Williamson II and published by BMI".

Side 1

1. "Bye Bye Bird" – 2:23
2. "Pontiac Blues" – 3:45
3. "Take It Easy Baby" – 4:09
4. "I Don't Care No More" – 3:18
5. "Do the Weston" – 4:00

Side 2

1. "Mister Downchild" – 3:56
2. "23 Hours Too Long" – 5:04
3. "Out on the Water Coast" – 3:00
4. "Baby Don't Worry" – 4:28

== Reissues ==
Sonny Boy Williamson & the Yardbirds has been reissued numerous times. Sometimes the tracks were resequenced and the cover art was updated with photos of the later period Yardbirds. Questions over the ownership of the master tapes and the rights to authorize their release has led to many competing and overlapping albums. Beginning in 1981, Lippmann and Rau began releasing other material recorded around the same time. These albums sometimes included various combinations of additional recordings with Williamson, the Yardbirds' 8 December 1963, solo set, and early group demos. In 1984, Gomelsky released the first of several box sets by the group, Shapes of Things, which also combined these tracks. (Note: The 1993 four-CD box set Train Kept a Rollin' – The Complete Giorgio Gomelsky Productions (Charly LIKBOX3) and the Yardbirds Story 2002 reissue omitted "I Don't Care No More" and "Baby Don't Worry" from the original album; these are essentially solo pieces by Williamson and feature little or no Yardbirds backing.) New albums continue to appear, sometimes packaged with recordings of Williamson backed by the Animals on 30 December 1963, and with Jimmy Page and Brian Auger in January 1965.

== Personnel ==
- Sonny Boy Williamson II – vocal, harmonica

The Yardbirds

- Eric Clapton – guitar
- Chris Dreja – guitar
- Jim McCarty – drums
- Paul Samwell-Smith – bass
- Keith Relf – handclapping, shouting, foot-tapping

== Sources ==
- Sonny Boy Williamson & the Yardbirds (Album notes). Sonny Boy Williamson II and the Yardbirds. Mercury Records. 1966. OCLC 14370727. SR 61071.
- Bacon, Tony (1999). London Live: From the Yardbirds to Pink Floyd to the Sex Pistols. Balafon. ISBN 978-0879305727.
- Bowling, David (2013). Eric Clapton FAQ: All That's Left to Know About Slowhand. Milwaukee, Wisconsin: Hal Leonard. ISBN 978-1617135743.
- Brunning, Bob (1986). Blues: The British Connection. Poole, UK: Blandford Press. ISBN 0-7137-1587-1.
- Clapton, Eric (2007). Clapton: The Autobiography. New York City: Broadway Books. ISBN 978-0-7679-2536-5.
- Clark, Rick (1996). "The Yardbirds". In Erlewine, Michael (ed.). All Music Guide to the Blues. San Francisco: Miller Freeman Books. ISBN 0-87930-424-3.
- Clayson, Alan (2002). The Yardbirds. San Francisco: Backbeat Books. ISBN 0-87930-724-2.
- French, David (2020). Heart Full of Soul: Keith Relf of the Yardbirds. Jefferson, North Carolina: McFarland & Company. ISBN 978-1-4766-8011-8.
- Gomelsky, Giorgio; Cohen, Phil (2002). The Yardbirds Story (Boxed set booklet). The Yardbirds. United Kingdom: Charly Records. OCLC 62367983. SNAD 905 CD.
- Koda, Cub; Russo, Gregg (2001). Ultimate! (Box set booklet). The Yardbirds. Los Angeles: Rhino Records. OCLC 781357622. R2 79825.
- Russo, Greg (2016). Yardbirds: The Ultimate Rave-Up (6th. ed.). Crossfire Publications. ISBN 978-0-9791845-7-4.
- Schumacher, Michael (2003). Crossroads: The Life and Music of Eric Clapton. New York City: Citadel Press. ISBN 978-0806524665.
- Welch, Chris (2007). Sonny Boy Williamson & the Yardbirds (Reissue album notes). Sonny Boy Williamson II, the Yardbirds. Repertoire Records. REP 4776.
