= Having a Rave Up with the Yardbirds =

1965 album by the Yardbirds

- Expanded reissue (Sunspots, Italy 2002)

Studio album / live album by the Yardbirds
- Released: 15 November 1965
- Recorded: March 1964 (live); April–September 1965 (studio)
- Venues: Marquee Club, London
- Studios: Phillips, Memphis; Chess, Chicago; Columbia, New York City; Advision and Olympic, London
- Genres: Blues rock; garage rock; blues; experimental pop
- Length: 37:40
- Label: Epic
- Producer: Giorgio Gomelsky

The Yardbirds US album chronology
For Your Love (1965)	Having a Rave Up with the Yardbirds (1965)	Over Under Sideways Down (1966)

Having a Rave Up with the Yardbirds, or simply Having a Rave Up, is the second American album by the English rock group the Yardbirds. It was released in November 1965, eight months after Jeff Beck replaced Eric Clapton on guitar. It includes songs with both guitarists and reflects the group's blues rock roots and their early experimentations with psychedelic and hard rock. The title refers to the driving "rave up" arrangement the band used in several of their songs.

The album contains some live recordings from March 1964 when Clapton was the lead guitarist, and which first appeared on the band's British debut album, Five Live Yardbirds, which was not issued in the United States. The songs with Beck were recorded in the studio in the months after he joined the group in March 1965. These include several charting singles and introduced "The Train Kept A-Rollin'", one of the Yardbirds' most copied arrangements. Although most were not written by the group, the songs became a fixture of the group's concert repertoire and continued to be performed after Jimmy Page replaced Beck.

Next to their 1967 Greatest Hits collection, Having a Rave Up is the Yardbirds' highest-charting album in the US and has remained in print longer than others in the band's catalogue. The album continues to be reissued, often with bonus material, such as the next single "Shapes of Things", demo recordings for their follow-up album, and "Stroll On", featuring dual lead guitar by Beck and Page, from the Blow-Up soundtrack. Several music critics have cited the album's influence, particularly on hard rock guitar.

== Background ==
Singer and harmonica player Keith Relf, rhythm guitarist Chris Dreja, bassist Paul Samwell-Smith, drummer Jim McCarty, and lead guitarist Top Topham formed the Yardbirds near London in mid-1963. The group were a part of the early British rhythm and blues scene that produced bands such as the Rolling Stones, whom they replaced as the resident act at the Crawdaddy Club. Songs by American blues and rhythm and blues artists such as Muddy Waters, Howlin' Wolf, and Bo Diddley made up the repertoire of the early British R&B groups. The Yardbirds' set lists included "I Wish You Would", "Smokestack Lightning", "Who Do You Love?", "You Can't Judge a Book by the Cover", and "Too Much Monkey Business".

Eric Clapton replaced Topham in October 1963 and by early 1964, the Yardbirds had expanded their following on the home counties club circuit. The group made several attempts at recording in the studio, but were unable to reproduce their live sound to their satisfaction. Manager Giorgio Gomelsky then arranged to have a March performance at London's Marquee Club recorded. A key element of the Yardbirds' live shows was an extended instrumental section during some songs. Clapton recalled, "While most other bands were playing three-minute songs, we were taking three-minute numbers and stretching them out to five or six minutes, during which time the audience would go crazy". (Note: During rave ups Clapton often broke a guitar string. While he was putting on a new one, the audience would slowly clap their hands (slow handclapping). This led manager Gomelski to nickname him "Eric 'Slowhand' Clapton".) Dubbed a "rave up", this musical arrangement usually came during the middle instrumental section, in which the band shifted the beat into double-time and built the instrumental improvisation to a climax. The rave up has roots in jazz and became a signature part of the Yardbirds' sound. Musicologist Michael Hicks describes it:

Wherever it occurred, the rave-up made a small narrative curve that introduced a basic conflict (backbeat vs. off-beats), drove that conflict to a climax (by getting more and more raucous), then resolved it (by returning it to a 'normal' beat). Through this technique the Yardbirds created a rock mannerism; sometimes the rave-up seemed the whole point of the song.

Several songs recorded at the Marquee show use this arrangement and are included on the debut album, Five Live Yardbirds, which was released in the UK in December 1964. Although AllMusic critic Bruce Eder calls it "the best such [British rock] live record of the entire middle of the decade", it did not reach the charts and was not issued in the US. Four songs from the album made their first American appearance on Having a Rave Up.

After their first two singles, "I Wish You Would" and "Good Morning Little Schoolgirl", had limited success, the Yardbirds were under pressure to deliver a hit record by their label, Columbia Records. Samwell-Smith interested the group in recording "For Your Love", a new pop rock-oriented song written by Graham Gouldman. Clapton expressed displeasure over departing from the group's blues roots, and he left the Yardbirds two days before the song was released on 5 March 1965. "For Your Love" became their first Top 10 hit in both the UK and the US. To replace Clapton, the group needed a lead guitarist who was experienced with blues and R&B, but also willing to explore more progressive and experimental material. They approached Jimmy Page, but he was unwilling to give up his steady employment as one of London's most popular studio guitarists. Page recommended Jeff Beck, who was invited to an informal audition. Drummer McCarty recalled the tryout: "Not only could he play all the Eric stuff, but also a lot more ... There was the Les Paul thing, the rockabilly thing, the whole lot. His style was also kind of futuristic. We were impressed." Beck was asked to join and played his first gig with the Yardbirds the same day "For Your Love" was released.

Shortly thereafter, the Yardbirds began recording a successful string of forward-looking singles with Beck's pioneering hard rock and psychedelic guitar work. Their first American album, For Your Love, which included Beck's earliest recordings with the group and earlier singles and demos with Clapton, was rush-released in June 1965 as they were preparing for their first American tour. In November 1965, less than a month before the beginning of the Yardbirds' second tour of the US, Having a Rave Up was released and also combined songs recorded with both Clapton and Beck.

== Composition and musical style ==
With the exception of "Still I'm Sad", the songs on Having a Rave Up were not composed by the Yardbirds. Two of the album's hits, "Heart Full of Soul" and "Evil Hearted You", were written for the group by Gouldman, who had composed "For Your Love". Both songs saw the group continuing to move beyond their blues-rock beginnings with Beck's experimental guitar work. "Heart Full of Soul" is one of the earliest rock songs to incorporate Indian musical influences. Several months before the Beatles popularised the sound with "Norwegian Wood", demos for "Heart Full of Soul" were attempted with sitar accompaniment. However, the Indian sitar player had difficulty with the 4/4 metre and the instrument lacked the power the group desired. Instead, Beck produced a sitar-like effect by bending the higher notes on his guitar in an Eastern-sounding scale and using a Tone Bender distortion device to get a more distinctive tone. The minor key, pop-oriented "Evil Hearted You" also incorporates exotic-sounding elements. Rock critic Richie Unterberger notes the "haunting Middle Eastern-influenced melody ... typically eerie backup harmonies, [and] Keith Relf's menacing, hurt lead vocal". Beck provides a steel guitar-like slide solo, which biographer Martin Power describes as a "shimmering two-octave slide solo sounding almost ghostly". "You're a Better Man Than I" was written by Mike Hugg and his brother Brian. The song reflects the folk-rock style of the time with socially conscious lyrics. Relf's folk-ballad vocal is complemented by Beck's vibrato- and sustain-heavy guitar solo. "Still I'm Sad" is the album's sole original tune by the band, written by Samwell-Smith and McCarty. It is a slow, brooding piece with psychedelic pop elements. Built on a mock-Gregorian chant, the song has seven vocal parts with producer Gomelsky adding a droning bass vocal under Relf's melody.

Yardbirds records like these were eagerly taken up by the aspiring guitarists and other rock-and-roll obsessives who were forming garage bands at the time ... "We'd do a lot of gigs where the opening band would play all our songs," [drummer Jim] McCarty recalls.

— Alan di Perna, Guitar Masters: Intimate Portraits (2012)

The balance of the songs are blues and R&B numbers. Two versions of the Bo Diddley tune "I'm a Man" are on the album – a live rendering with Clapton and a re-worked studio version with Beck. These two recordings illustrate differences between Clapton's and Beck's styles during their tenures with the Yardbirds. Clapton employs a more traditional sound with chording, whereas Beck takes a more novel approach, which Power describes: "[T]hings changed radically at one minute, 28 seconds into the song when Beck's foot smashed into his Tone Bender [and he] and Relf chased after each other in a manic harmonica/guitar interface, notes swooping in and out of the mix". Although just over two and a half minutes, critic Cub Koda calls the Beck version "perhaps the most famous Yardbirds rave-up of all" and Power asserts "it was the closest the group had yet come to capturing the sound of the 'rave-up' on tape".

The remaining three live songs with Clapton feature extended instrumental improvisation. Bo Diddley's "Here 'Tis" and the Isley Brothers' "Respectable" are fast-tempo, rhythmic-based songs that are essentially rave ups. On "Here 'Tis", Clapton adds an uncharacteristically energetic rhythm guitar over Samwell-Smith's driving bass lines. In his autobiography, Clapton identifies Howlin' Wolf's "Smokestack Lightning" as the Yardbirds' most popular live number. They usually played it every night and performances of the song could last up to 30 minutes. On the 5:35 album version, Clapton trades guitar licks with Relf's harmonica lines. Howlin' Wolf reportedly referred to the group's "Smokestack Lightning" as "the definitive version of his song".

The Yardbirds based their version of "The Train Kept A-Rollin'" on the 1956 rockabilly arrangement by Johnny Burnette and the Rock and Roll Trio. However, their recording adds a brief rave up section, new guitar parts, and a harmonica solo. Beck biographer Annette Carson notes, "the Yardbirds' recording plucked the old Rock & Roll Trio number from obscurity and turned it into a classic among classics".

== Recording and production ==
The recordings with Beck for Having a Rave Up took place at various studios between April and September 1965. Three were recorded during the Yardbirds' first American tour – "The Train Kept A-Rollin'" and "You're a Better Man than I" were recorded 12 September 1965 by Sam Phillips at his Phillips Recording studio in Memphis, Tennessee, and "I'm a Man" (studio version) at the Chess Studios in Chicago by Ron Malo 19 September 1965. Further refinements to the three songs were recorded at the Columbia Recording Studio in New York City by Roy Halee 21 and 22 September 1965. (Note: A fourth song, "New York City Blues", based on "Five Long Years", was also recorded in New York and included as the B-side to the "Shapes of Things" US single and on several compilations.)

Another three songs with Beck were recorded by Roger Cameron at Advision Studios in London – "Heart Full of Soul" 20 April 1965, "Still I'm Sad" 17 August 1965 (also at Olympic Studios by Keith Grant 27 July 1965), and "Evil Hearted You" 23 August 1965. The four remaining live songs with Clapton were recorded in March 1964 at the Marquee Club in London – "Smokestack Lightning", "Respectable", "I'm a Man", and "Here 'Tis". These were taken from the UK debut album Five Live Yardbirds.

The album was produced by the Yardbirds' manager Gomelsky with Samwell-Smith. Clapton acknowledges that Samwell-Smith was behind the group's rave up sound and on "For Your Love", Samwell-Smith assumed the role of de facto producer. He received a credit as "Musical Director" for their first American album as well as Having a Rave Up. By the time Samwell-Smith left the group in June 1966, Koda notes, "he was shouldering most, if not all, of the production and arranging responsibilities".

== Release and charts ==
Having a Rave Up was released in the US on 15 November 1965 by the Yardbirds' American label, Epic Records. The album cover photo shows the group posing in matching black suits in a mock performance; Yardbirds' biographer Adam Clayson compares it to "more of a tea dance than a rave-up". (Note: On the album cover, Beck is shown playing a 1954 Fender Esquire. He purchased the guitar shortly before the Yardbirds' September 1965 US tour and used it for recording several songs on Having a Rave Up and "Shapes of Things".) Clapton, who left the band eight months earlier, is not pictured on the album cover. The liner note reads like ad copy, with no mention of the band members or recording information. The album entered Billboard magazine's Top LPs chart in December 1965 at number 137 and reached number 53 in February 1966. In total, it spent 33 weeks in the chart. (Note: Having a Rave Up outlasted the Rolling Stones' December's Children (And Everybody's), the Kinks' Kinkdom, and the Animals' Animal Tracks, which were released around the same time (The Who Sings My Generation failed to chart in the US).) Having a Rave Up remained in print until 1972, longer than any other Yardbirds album on Epic.

Having a Rave Up or an equivalent was not released in the UK, where it was the practice at the time not to include singles on albums. The live tracks with Clapton appeared on Five Live Yardbirds, which was issued on 4 December 1964. Between June and October 1965, "Heart Full of Soul", "Evil Hearted You", and "Still I'm Sad" were released as singles and reached the pop chart Top 10. In February 1966, "You're a Better Man than I" became the UK B-side of "Shapes of Things". "The Train Kept A-Rollin'" and "I'm a Man" (studio version) were not released in the UK until 1976 and 1977, well after the group had disbanded. In January 1966, the Yardbirds' UK label, Columbia, pressed Having a Rave Up for export to Germany and Sweden. In Canada, the album was issued by Capitol Records in 1966.

== Live and film performances ==
Five songs from Having a Rave Up, plus the following two singles, made up the core of the Yardbirds' concert repertoire: "Smokestack Lightning", "I'm a Man", "Heart Full of Soul", "You're a Better Man Than I", "The Train Kept A-Rollin'", "Shapes of Things", and "Over Under Sideways Down". Numerous live performances were recorded beginning in mid-1965 and include these songs. They were also recorded by the BBC on various dates for broadcast. In 1991, several were released on Yardbirds ...On Air (reissued in 1997 as BBC Sessions).

During one of many appearances on Ready Steady Go!, the UK pop music variety television programme, the Yardbirds performed an updated version of "Here 'Tis" with Beck. After Page joined the group in June 1966, film director Michelangelo Antonioni wanted to add a scene of the Yardbirds performing "The Train Kept A-Rollin'" to his 1966 film Blowup. Relf wrote new lyrics and the group worked out a new instrumental arrangement with both Beck and Page on lead guitars, retitled "Stroll On". The performance is included in the film and on the Blow-Up soundtrack album.

When Beck left the group in October 1966, Page became the sole guitarist. Although several new songs were added, set lists still included their earlier material. A 1968 live performance in New York City (released in 1971 as Live Yardbirds: Featuring Jimmy Page) features the core songs, plus the Page solo piece "White Summer" and an early version of "Dazed and Confused". Page carried over these songs to Led Zeppelin and "Smokestack Lightning" became a medley, which developed into "How Many More Times". Dreja sums up the lasting appeal: "We all feel, I think, that the period Jeff spent with the band was the most creative. His scope of inventiveness was probably the widest of the three guitarists we played with—and none of them were exactly slouches."

== Critical reception and influence ==
Having a Rave Up was released before the advent of critical rock music journalism. A December 1965 staff review in Billboard indicated the album's potential to enter the Top LPs chart. (Note: To put Having a Rave Up into context, also reviewed in the same Billboard issue were the Rolling Stones' December's Children (And Everybody's), the Dave Clark Five's I Like It Like That, and The Beau Brummels, Volume 2. Also announced was the Beatles' new album, Rubber Soul.) Several retrospective reviews have been favourable. AllMusic's Eder gave the album four and a half out of five stars and describes it as "one of the best LPs of the entire British invasion, on a par with the greatest mid-1960s work of the Beatles and the Rolling Stones". Author Denise Sullivan noted, "Among British blues-rock albums, this Giorgio Gomelsky production is the pick for its wealth of hits and its influence on garage rock and hard rock lead guitar."

Clapton biographer David Bowling calls the album "early and important rock 'n' roll ... It remains an important step in the evolution of rock music." A review in Guitar Player magazine included:

Today [circa 1989], the Yardbirds' second American album sounds something like the ultimate garage band meets an end-of-the-world guitarist. For a while in '65, though, Having a Rave Up with the Yardbirds (Epic, LN 24177) contained rock's freshest, most vital guitar playing.

Rolling Stone magazine ranked the album at number 355 on its list of the "500 Greatest Albums of All Time". (Note: Number 355 on the Rolling Stone list as updated in 2012; the 2020 update does not include the album.) The accompanying review noted, "Freed from Eric Clapton's blues purism and spurred by Jeff Beck's reckless exhibitionism, the Yardbirds launched a noisy rock & roll avant-garde. This is the bridge between beat groups and psychedelia." Ultimate Classic Rock identified the album as one of "The Top 100 '60s Rock Albums" in 2015. The accompanying listing statement focuses on the guitarists: "Half Eric Clapton (on the live blues part), half Jeff Beck (on the more experimental pop stuff), this is the two sides of the Yardbirds reaching for a common ground. Take your pick: The electricity surging through both guitarists powers a band that had songs and chops to spare."

== Track listing ==
=== Original album ===
Songwriters and track running times are taken from the original American Epic LP. Releases in other countries, reissues, etc., may have different listings.

Side one (1965 studio with Beck)
No.	Title	Writer(s)	Length
1.	"You're a Better Man Than I"	Mike Hugg	3:17
2.	"Evil Hearted You"	Graham Gouldman	2:24
3.	"I'm a Man"	Ellas McDaniel (Note: Epic Records spelled Bo Diddley's last name as "Daniels". For the first release of "I'm a Man" on Five Live Yardbirds, Columbia (UK) listed the writers as "Pomus-Shuman" (Doc Pomus and Mort Shuman wrote a different "I'm a Man" that was recorded by Fabian in 1959).) a.k.a. Bo Diddley	2:37
4.	"Still I'm Sad"	Paul Samwell-Smith, Jim McCarty	2:57
5.	"Heart Full of Soul"	Gouldman	2:28
6.	"The Train Kept A-Rollin'"	not listed ("In Manuscript" is included under "Publishers") (Note: The first live release of "The Train Kept A Rollin'" on Live Yardbirds: Featuring Jimmy Page (1971) is credited to Tiny Bradshaw, Lois Mann, and Howard Kay)	3:26

Side two (1964 live with Clapton)
No.	Title	Writer(s)	Length
1.	"Smokestack Lightning"	Chester Burnett a.k.a. Howlin' Wolf	5:35
2.	"Respectable"	O'Kelly Isley, Ronald Isley, Rudolph Isley	5:28
3.	"I'm a Man"	McDaniel	4:24
4.	"Here 'Tis"	McDaniel	5:04
Total length:			37:40

=== Album reissues ===
The Yardbirds' 2001 compilation album Ultimate! contains eight of the ten tracks from the original album. Having a Rave Up has been reissued by several record labels, including Repertoire (1999, 2007), Get Back (1999), JVC (2000, 2009), and Sunspots (2002). In addition to the ten tracks from the original album, the Repertoire reissue includes the Yardbirds' next US single (tracks 11–12); demos recorded March–April 1966 for their upcoming Yardbirds/Over Under Sideways Down (a.k.a. Roger the Engineer) album (tracks 13–18); backing tracks for a Ready Steady Go! television appearance (tracks 19–20); and the soundtrack contribution to Blow-Up (track 21).

Repertoire reissue additional material
No.	Title	Writer(s)	Length
11.	"Shapes of Things"	Paul Samwell-Smith, Keith Relf, Jim McCarty	2:24
12.	"New York City Blues"	Relf, Chris Dreja	4:17
13.	"Jeff's Blues" ("The Nazz Are Blue" demo)	Jeff Beck	3:02
14.	"Someone to Love" ("Lost Woman" demo, Part 1, Take 15)	Beck, Relf, Samwell-Smith, Dreja, McCarty	2:22
15.	"Someone to Love" ("Lost Woman" demo, Part 2)	Beck, Relf, Samwell-Smith, Dreja, McCarty	4:16
16.	"Like Jimmy Reed Again" (demo)	Beck, Relf, Samwell-Smith, Dreja, McCarty	3:02
17.	"Chris' Number" (demo)	Beck, Relf, Samwell-Smith, Dreja, McCarty	2:21
18.	"What Do You Want" (demo, Take 4)	Beck, Relf, Samwell-Smith, Dreja, McCarty	3:09
19.	"Here 'Tis" (a.k.a. "For RSG", instrumental track)	Ellas McDaniel a.k.a. Bo Diddley	3:48
20.	"Here 'Tis" (vocal version)	McDaniel	4:04
21.	"Stroll On"	Relf, Beck, Jimmy Page, Dreja, McCarty	2:44
Total length:			73:09

== Personnel ==
=== The Yardbirds ===
- Keith Relf – vocals, harmonica, acoustic guitar, percussion
- Jeff Beck – lead guitar (Side 1 and all reissue bonus tracks)
- Eric Clapton – lead guitar (Side 2)
- Chris Dreja – rhythm guitar (except on "Stroll On" bonus track where he plays bass)
- Paul Samwell-Smith – bass guitar, backing vocals, musical director
- Jim McCarty – drums, backing vocals
- Jimmy Page – second lead guitar on "Stroll On" bonus track

=== with ===
- Giorgio Gomelsky – producer, backing bass vocal on "Still I'm Sad"
- Ron Prentice – bass on "Heart Full of Soul"

== Notes ==
=== References ===
- "Album Reviews – Pop Spotlight: Having a Rave Up with the Yardbirds". Billboard. Vol. 77, no. 49. 4 December 1965. ISSN 0006-2510.
- "Top LP's". Billboard. Vol. 78, no. 34. 20 August 1966. ISSN 0006-2510.
- Birnbaum, Larry (2012). Before Elvis: The Prehistory of Rock 'n' Roll. Lanham, Massachusetts: Scarecrow Press. ISBN 978-0-8108-8629-2.
- Bowling, David (2013). Eric Clapton FAQ: All That's Left to Know About Slowhand. Milwaukee, Wisconsin: Hal Leonard. ISBN 978-1617135743.
- Carson, Annette (2001). Jeff Beck: Crazy Fingers. San Francisco, California: Backbeat Books. ISBN 0-87930-632-7.
- Casabona, Helen, ed. (1989). Rock Guitar. Milwaukee, Wisconsin: Hal Leonard. ISBN 978-0881889086.
- Clapton, Eric (2007). Clapton: The Autobiography. New York City: Broadway Books. ISBN 978-0-7679-2536-5.
- Clark, Rick (1996). "The Yardbirds". In Erlewine, Michael (ed.). All Music Guide to the Blues. San Francisco: Miller Freeman Books. ISBN 0-87930-424-3.
- Clayson, Alan (2002). The Yardbirds. San Francisco: Backbeat Books. ISBN 0-87930-724-2.
- di Perna, Alan (2012). Guitar Masters: Intimate Portraits. Milwaukee, Wisconsin: Hal Leonard. ISBN 978-1480329706.
- Eder, Bruce (2001). "The Yardbirds". In Bogdanov, Vladimir; Woodstra, Chris; Erlewine, Stephen Thomas (eds.). All Music Guide: The Definitive Guide to Popular Music. San Francisco: Backbeat Books. ISBN 978-0879306274.
- Gomelsky, Giorgio; Cohen, Phil (2002). The Yardbirds Story (Boxed set booklet). The Yardbirds. United Kingdom: Charly Records. OCLC 62367983. SNAD 905 CD.
- Hulett, Ralph; Prochnicky, Jerry (2011). Whole Lotta Led: Our Flight with Led Zeppelin. New York City: Kensington Publishing. ISBN 978-0806535555.
- Hicks, Michael (2000). Sixties Rock: Garage, Psychedelic, and Other Satisfactions. Champaign, Illinois: University of Illinois Press. ISBN 978-0252069154.
- Koda, Cub; Russo, Gregg (2001). Ultimate! (Boxed set booklet). The Yardbirds. Los Angeles: Rhino Records. OCLC 781357622. R2 79825.
- Power, Martin (2011). Hot Hired Guitar: The Life of Jeff Beck. London: Omnibus Press. ISBN 978-1-84938-869-6.
- Russo, Greg (2016). Yardbirds: The Ultimate Rave-Up. Floral Park, New York: Crossfire Publications. ISBN 978-0-9791845-7-4.
- Russo, Greg; Paytress, Mark (2011). Glimpses 1963–1968 (Boxed set booklet). The Yardbirds. United Kingdom: Easy Action. OCLC 811355562. EARS 035.
- Santoro, Gene (1991). Beckology (Boxed set booklet). Jeff Beck. New York City: Epic Records/Legacy Recordings. OCLC 144959074. 48661.
- Schumacher, Michael (2003). Crossroads: The Life and Music of Eric Clapton. New York City: Citadel Press. ISBN 978-0806524665.
- Shadwick, Keith (2005). Led Zeppelin: The Story of a Band and Their Music 1968–1980 (1st ed.). San Francisco: Backbeat Books. ISBN 0-87930-871-0.
- Sullivan, Denise (2004). White Stripes – Sweethearts of the Blues. Milwaukee, Wisconsin: Hal Leonard. ISBN 978-1617802270.
