= Scout Records =

Scout Records was the relatively short-lived German independent record label, founded and owned in the late 1960s by the German concert promoters Horst Lippmann and Fritz Rau, before in 1979 they founded their main label L+R Records.

The Scout label released seven blues albums, among them three compilations, one solo album of Howlin' Wolf's guitarist Hubert Sumlin, the first solo album of J. B. Lenoir, and recordings of the American Folk Blues Festivals 1969 and 1970.

They also issued a triple-LP with recordings of the Deutsches Jazz Festival Frankfurt 1970, containing tracks by - amongst others - Albert Mangelsdorff, Just Music, Klaus Doldinger Quartet, Phil Woods and his European Rhythm Machine, Dave Pike Set, Peter Brötzmann Group, Pierre Favre Group, Joachim Kuhn Group, Gunter Hampel Group, European Free Jazz Orchestra of the Art Ensemble of Chicago.
