= The Yardbirds Greatest Hits =

Greatest hits album by the Yardbirds
- Released: March 1967
- Recorded: 1964–1966
- Genre: Rock
- Length: 30:26
- Label: Epic
- Producers: Giorgio Gomelsky, Simon Napier-Bell

The Yardbirds' US album chronology
Over Under Sideways Down (1966)	The Yardbirds Greatest Hits (1967)	Little Games (1967)

The Yardbirds Greatest Hits is the first compilation album of songs recorded by the Yardbirds. It was released in the United States in March 1967 by Epic Records and included all six of the Yardbirds' American A-side singles up to that time, plus three B-sides and the live "Smokestack Lightning" from Having a Rave Up and Five Live Yardbirds. (Note: Group chronicler Greg Russo also gives a secondary "street" release date of 17 April 1967.)

The album was the group's highest charting LP record in the US, peaking at number 28 on the Billboard 200 album chart. Despite the modest peak, it ranked number 73 on the magazine's year-end "Top LP's – 1967" chart because of its longevity.

== Critical reception ==
Professional ratings
Review scores
Source	Rating
AllMusic	4.5/5 stars

AllMusic critic Bruce Eder gave the album four and a half out of five stars, who comments "the whole platter summed up, just about as neatly as it was possible to do across just ten songs, what made the Yardbirds a great band." He notes that since the focus is on "hits", most of the selections feature guitarist Jeff Beck, although Eric Clapton and Jimmy Page are represented with one song each. Eder adds:

Given its layout and purpose, as well as complications brought about by the subsequent shifting ownership and licensing of different parts of the group's library, this ended up being the best single-disc LP compilation ever issued on this band ... And it was responsible for introducing many fans to the full range of the group's work.

== Track listing ==
Side one
No.	Title	Writer(s)	Original Release	Length
1.	"Shapes of Things"	Paul Samwell-Smith, Keith Relf, Jim McCarty	single	2:24
2.	"Still I'm Sad"	Smith, McCarty	B-side of "I'm a Man" (US)	2:59
3.	"New York City Blues"	Relf	B-side of "Shapes of Things" (US version 2)	4:17
4.	"For Your Love"	Graham Gouldman	single	2:27
5.	"Over Under Sideways Down"	Chris Dreja, McCarty, Jeff Beck, Relf, Samwell-Smith	single	2:22

Side two
No.	Title	Writer(s)	Original Release	Length
1.	"I'm a Man"	Ellas McDaniel a.k.a. Bo Diddley	single (US)	2:35
2.	"Happenings Ten Years Time Ago"	Relf, McCarty, Beck, Jimmy Page	single	2:49
3.	"Heart Full of Soul"	Gouldman	single	2:28
4.	"Smokestack Lightning"	Chester Burnett a.k.a. Howlin' Wolf	Five Live Yardbirds	5:35
5.	"I'm Not Talking"	Mose Allison	For Your Love	2:30

== Charts ==
Weekly chart performance
Chart (1967–68)	Peak position
Canada RPM Top 25 LPs	20
US Billboard Top LP's	28
US Cash Box Top 100 Albums	18
US Record World 100 Top LP's	11

Year-end chart performance
Chart (1967)	Peak position
US Billboard Top LP's	73
US Cash Box Top 100 Albums	69
