= Shapes of Things =

Song first recorded by the Yardbirds in 1966

- West German picture sleeve

Single by the Yardbirds
- B-side: "You're a Better Man Than I" (UK); "New York City Blues" (US, initially "I'm Not Talking")
- Released: 25 February 1966
- Recorded: December 1965 – January 1966
- Studio: Chess, Chicago; Columbia and RCA, Hollywood
- Genre: Psychedelic rock
- Length: 2:24
- Label: Columbia (UK); Epic (US)
- Songwriters: Jim McCarty; Keith Relf; Paul Samwell-Smith
- Producer: Giorgio Gomelsky

The Yardbirds UK singles chronology
"Evil Hearted You" / "Still I'm Sad" (1965)	"Shapes of Things" (1966)	"Over Under Sideways Down" (1966)

The Yardbirds US singles chronology
"I'm a Man" (1965)	"Shapes of Things" (1966)	"Over Under Sideways Down" (1966)

"Shapes of Things" is a song by the English rock group the Yardbirds. With its Eastern-sounding, feedback-laden guitar solo and environmentalist, antiwar lyrics, several music writers have identified it as the first popular psychedelic rock song. It is built on musical elements contributed by several group members in three different recording studios in the US, and was the first Yardbirds composition to become a chart hit; when released as a single on 25 February 1966, the song reached number three in the UK and number eleven in the US.

The song features Jeff Beck's musical use of feedback, which he learned to control by finding the guitar's resonant frequencies and bending the strings. Music writers have called his work on "Shapes of Things" groundbreaking, and cited its influence on the guitar playing of Paul McCartney and Jimi Hendrix. Several live Yardbirds recordings with Beck and later with Jimmy Page have been released.

In 1968, Beck reworked "Shapes of Things" as the lead track on his solo debut Truth. The new arrangement, along with other album tracks, has been described as a precursor to heavy metal. "Shapes of Things" is included in the Rock and Roll Hall of Fame's permanent exhibit of the "Songs That Shaped Rock and Roll", and several artists have recorded renditions of the song.

== Background and recording ==
By the end of 1965, the Yardbirds had released three albums and several singles. However, except for a few B-sides, their material was adapted from older blues and rhythm and blues songs or composed by songwriters not associated with the group. "I'm a Man", a reworking of the 1955 Bo Diddley song, was their most recent Top 40 radio hit. Giorgio Gomelsky, the group's producer and manager, arranged for the recording at Chess Records studio in Chicago during their first American tour in September 1965. One week after the start of the group's second US tour in December 1965, they were again at Chess. According to drummer Jim McCarty, the Yardbirds were experimenting with their sound, but had yet been unable to translate it into a hit song:

We were really coming from not trying to create a sort of a 3-minute piece of music, it was just something that seemed natural to us. We started with the rhythm, we used a bass riff that came from a jazz record, got a groove going with that and then added a few other bits from elsewhere, other ideas that we'd had. And I think it was a great success for us, it was a good hit record that wasn't really selling out. And it was original.

Beck confirmed McCarty's account and added, "Somebody'd say, 'Let's do something modern and exciting; we know we can get a good blues sound, so let's spread it out a little bit.' It was all spur of the moment, man". Over two days at Chess, a backing track was completed and the Yardbirds continued their American concert tour. Shortly after arriving in Hollywood, the group resumed recording at Columbia studios on 7 January and at RCA studios on 10 January 1966. Singer Keith Relf contributed lyrics and a melody for the song.

Although Beck had been impressed with the Chess studio's history and sound, he had been unable to complete a guitar solo to his satisfaction. "I kept changing guitar sounds all the way through. So we did two or three takes of my guitars and blended them all together. But the solo on 'Shapes of Things' was pretty honest up until that feedback note that comes in over it", he recalled. During the recording, "there was mass hysteria in the studio when I did that solo. They weren't expecting it and it was just some weird mist coming from the East out of an amp. Giorgio was freaking out and dancing about like some tribal witch doctor". Beck played the solo entirely on the G string of a 1954 Fender Esquire that he had purchased before the tour. Relf also benefitted from multi-tracking—two vocal tracks were recorded, allowing him to harmonise the vocal line.

== Lyrics and composition ==
Yardbirds' biographer Gregg Russo describes the song "a quantum leap in their development ... [it] proved at once progressive and commercial—the perfect marriage of socially conscious lyrics and a driving rhythm". Unterberger also saw the group moving into the area of social commentary that had begun with an earlier song, "You're a Better Man Than I". Beck biographer Martin Power describes the lyrics as environmentalist or antiwar, as seen in the verses "now the trees are almost green, but will they still be seen" and "please don't destroy these lands, don't make them desert sands". McCarty feels that they reflected opposition to the Vietnam War, and Relf biographer David French commented:

The abstract-sounding lyrics that Keith and Samwell-Smith came up with about the "shapes of things before my eyes" provided a timely screen onto project all the meaning of the emerging Sixties drug culture and the political turmoil of the Vietnam era. They also reflect the authors' own introverted natures and the earnest desire to improve both the world and themselves.

1966 UK single label listing "Musical Director: Paul Samwell-Smith"

"Shapes of Things" is credited to Relf, McCarty, and bassist Paul Samwell-Smith. Samwell-Smith, who is also listed as the song's musical director, believed that Beck should have also received songwriting credit for his contributions.

According to music writer Keith Shadwick, their arrangement follows a "simple and economical form that allowed its message to unfold naturally, inviting the sound enhancement at which Beck and bassist Paul Samwell-Smith were quickly becoming expert". McCarty recalled that Samwell-Smith got an idea for a bass line from a song by jazz pianist and composer Dave Brubeck (identified as "Pick Up Sticks" from Time Out) to which he added a marching-style drum beat. As they started to develop the rhythm, chords were added – "G and F, and then resolving it in D, each verse." For the guitar solo section, the beat shifts into double-time and the instrumentation heightens the tension. This rhythmic device, originally used in jazz improvisation, was the Yardbirds' signature arrangement, which they called a "rave-up".

A key feature of the song is Beck's innovative guitar playing. Shadwick comments that it "suited Beck's taste for shaping and sculpting guitar sounds through the control and manipulation of sustain and, on occasion, feedback". Beck recalled he began incorporating feedback into his guitar solos after he realised that he could control it, adding "I started finding the resonant points on the neck where it came in best. I loved it because it was a most peculiar sound that contrasted wildly with a plucked string, this round trombone-like noise coming from nowhere." In addition to feedback, Beck uses a musical scale and bent notes variously described as Middle Eastern or raga sounding. Critics and biographers have called the solo "monumental[ly] fuzz-drenched", "explosively warped", and "climaxed with a solitary, gigantic burst of feedback". For many, the song represents the Yardbirds' creative peak, including Beck, who commented that "'Shapes of Things' was the pinnacle of the Yardbirds" and "if I did nothing else, that was the best single".

== Releases and chart performance ==
Before its official release, the Yardbirds debuted "Shapes of Things" on The Lloyd Thaxton Show, an American pop music variety television programme. The group taped their lip synced performance, but with live drumming by McCarty, at the KCOP-TV Los Angeles facilities on 11 January 1966, the day after the recording was finished at RCA studios. The episode aired on 1 February 1966 and on 25 February, the single was released simultaneously in the UK (Columbia DB–7848) and the US (Epic 5–9891). In the UK, the B-side was "You're a Better Man Than I". In the US, the B-side was initially "I'm Not Talking", but was replaced on 25 March with "New York City Blues" (Epic 5–10006).

The single appeared on the UK charts on 3 March and reached the peak position of number three. In the US, it entered Billboard magazine's Hot 100 singles chart on 26 March at number 52 and peaked at number 11 on 14 May. For Billboard's year-end chart for the Top 100 singles of 1966, "Shapes of Things" was ranked at number 93.

1966 singles charts
Chart	Peak	Ref(s)
UK (Record Retailer)	3	
Canada (RPM)	7	
Germany (GfK)	22	
New Zealand (Listener)	2	
US Billboard Hot 100	11	
US CashBox Top 100	10	

The song's first appearance on an album was in September 1966 on the UK Columbia Records various artists compilation Go, Vol. 1. In the US, it was included as the opening track of The Yardbirds Greatest Hits, their highest charting American album. In 1971, a version with Relf's single vocal track was mistakenly issued in the UK on the Remember Yardbirds' compilation. Subsequently, "Shapes of Things" has appeared on numerous Yardbirds compilations, including the 1993 comprehensive box set Train Kept A-Rollin': The Complete Giorgio Gomelsky Productions (re-released in 2002 as The Yardbirds Story) and Rhino Records' 2001 Ultimate!.

In 1971, a live version recorded on 30 March 1968 in New York City with Page on guitar was included on the short-lived Live Yardbirds: Featuring Jimmy Page. Relf announced the song saying "Most people thought that we could never, ever recreate the solo part on stage; well we have a very good try at least—Jimmy 'Magic Fingers, Grand Sorcerer of the Magic Guitar'". In 2017, this performance was included on the Page-produced Yardbirds '68. Seven live versions are included on the 2010 rarities collection Glimpses 1963–1968, including one recorded a week after Page joined to play bass. A studio recording by the reconstituted Yardbirds in 2003, with guitar by Steve Vai, is included on Birdland.

== Critical reception ==
Over the years, music writers and critics have identified "Shapes of Things" as a milestone in psychedelic rock:

- Mitchell K. Hall: "The Yardbirds March [sic] 1966 single 'Shapes of Things,' with its blending of feedback, sudden rhythmic changes, exotic melody, and random lyrics about the predicament of humanity, is often noted as the first psychedelic rock song."
- Graham Bennett: "By December [1965] the Yardbirds had progressed to the point where they could record the first uncompromising psychedelic rock song, 'Shapes of Things', which became a hit single in both the UK and the US in early 1966."
- James E. Perone: "The 1966 song 'Shapes of Things,' [is] a performance that generally is considered one of, if not the first psychedelic rock record".
- Richie Unterberger: "Their [the Yardbirds'] early '66 hit 'Shapes of Things' was arguably the first out-and-out psychedelic rock song, with its blistering feedback, veering tempos, and stream-of-conscienceness lyrics that owed nothing to traditional romantic themes." "'Shapes of Things,' which (along with the Byrds' 'Eight Miles High') can justifiably be classified as the first psychedelic rock classic".
- David Simonelli: "The Yardbirds 'Shapes of Things', released a month earlier [than the Byrd's 'Eight Miles High'], achieved the same status [as the first 'psychedelic' hit and became] the first British band to have the term applied to one of its songs." "'Shapes of Things' (1966) included a wild guitar solo by Beck, a long [feedback] drone that gave the song a psychedelic feel well before such a sound was popular in rock music."

== Jeff Beck Group version ==
"Shapes of Things"
- Japanese single picture sleeve

Song by Jeff Beck Group

from the album Truth
- Released: July 1968 (US); October 1968 (UK)
- Recorded: May 1968
- Studio: EMI, London
- Genre: Blues rock; psychedelic rock; hard rock
- Length: 3:19
- Label: Epic (US); EMI Columbia (UK)
- Songwriters: Paul Samwell-Smith (only credit on Truth, see text)
- Producer: Mickie Most

In May 1968, Jeff Beck re-recorded "Shapes of Things" with his new band, the Jeff Beck Group, for their debut album Truth. According to Beck, vocalist Rod Stewart suggested that they record the song and Beck added, "let's slow it down and make it dirty and evil". Music critic Bruce Eder calls the reworking of the Yardbirds' tune "strikingly bold ... deliberately rebuilding the song from the ground up so it sounds closer to Howlin' Wolf". Despite the new arrangement, the album liner notes only list the writer as Samwell-Smith and on the 1991 Beckology boxed set, Chris Dreja is included along with Relf, McCarty, and Samwell-Smith.

Beck continued to explore new guitar sounds and used a recently purchased Sho-Bud steel guitar to create the slide fills for the song. Martin Power describes the songs' instrumental break as "its 'pistols at dawn' mid-section, which found Jeff and [drummer] Micky Waller chasing each other through a maze of drum rolls, crashing cymbals, slashing chords, and creamy arpeggios". In an AllMusic song review, music writer Joe Viglione also notes that "Mickey Waller's drums not only hold the beat, they work with Ron Wood's bass in unique rhythms" to support Beck's guitar performance.

"Shapes of Things" was the first song on Truth and, with its aggressive, heavily amplified sound, set the tone for the album. Most of the album was recorded with Beck's 1959 Gibson Les Paul guitar, occasionally routed through a Tone Bender fuzzbox effects pedal. Truth has been cited as the "prototype of heavy metal"; according to Beck: "I suppose they [the songs on Truth] pointed towards that road, but not the heavy metal you recognise today". Bolstered by a well-received concert tour, Truth was very successful in the US, peaking at number 15 in the Billboard 200 album chart one month after its July 1968 release. In October 1968, it was issued in the UK, but did not reach the album charts. (Note: Beck's manager, Peter Grant, followed this strategy with his new act, Led Zeppelin, six months later.) After a concert on 11 October 1968 in Chicago, a promotional film was made of "Shapes of Things", which is one of the few 1968 group performances caught on film.

== Recognition and influence ==
"Shapes of Things" is included in the Rock and Roll Hall of Fame list of "500 Songs That Shaped Rock and Roll". Q magazine placed the song at number 61 in its March 2005 list of the "100 Greatest Guitar Tracks Ever!" Beatles' historian Ian MacDonald, writing in Revolution in the Head, described Beck's solo as "groundbreaking" and also identified it as the "probable inspiration" for Paul McCartney's guitar solo in "Taxman". Beck biographer Annette Carson says that it was "widely held to have inspired" McCartney. French notes that "Beck has been cited as inspiring both Paul McCartney's guitar solo on 'Taxman' and the Paul Butterfield Band's 'East-West'". Butterfield's 1966 instrumental has been identified as an important influence on the developing extended-jam acid rock scene. Butterfield guitarist Mike Bloomfield claimed that Beck's use of controlled feedback in Yardbirds' songs influenced Jimi Hendrix's approach. Shadwick adds that Hendrix closely studied Beck's sonic approach on "Shapes of Things". (Note: According to Power's biography, Hendrix saw Beck perform with the Yardbirds in New York City (Beck left the group in October 1966), was "highly complimentary of Jeff's work" and lifted a guitar lick from "Happenings Ten Years Time Ago". However, in an interview with the Los Angeles Free Press, Hendrix said: "I wasn't really influenced by Beck. I only heard one record by him, 'The Shapes of Things', and I really dug it. I just listened to it and I liked it.")

Several artists have recorded "Shapes of Things" over the years, some following the original and others using the Jeff Beck Group arrangement. Led Zeppelin occasionally included a portion of the song in medleys during early concert performances. David Bowie recorded a cover version for his 1973 album Pin Ups, using the Yardbirds arrangement as the basis. The New Rolling Stone Album Guide described it as "the one great moment [on Pin Ups] where Bowie becomes an unlikely ecologist" and AllMusic called it one of the album's "showcases for Bowie's and Mick Ronson's guitars". (Note: Bowie also recorded the Yardbirds' first single "I Wish You Would" for Pin Ups.) In 1984, Gary Moore recorded a version for his album Victims of the Future, which is described as "allow[ing] Moore to show off his smoking six-string skills, and serves as proof that with a little more luck, Moore would have been up there with Van Halen, Vai, and Satriani as top rock guitarists of the '80s".

During his 1999 concert appearances with the Black Crowes, Page played it following Beck's Truth arrangement. Their rendition appears on Live at the Greek as "Shapes of Things to Come". In 2004, Rush recorded the song for Feedback, their EP featuring classic rock songs. (Note: Also for the Feedback EP, Rush recorded the Yardbirds "Heart Full of Soul".) A review in AllMusic described it as "fun, and a real attempt to provide nuance to a great song, especially the cross-channel fading in the guitar mix".

== Notes ==
Footnotes

Citations

References

- Bennett, Graham (2010). Soft Machine: Out-bloody-rageous. SAF. ISBN 978-0946719846.
- Brackett, Nathan; Hoard, Christian David, eds. (2004). The New Rolling Stone Album Guide. New York City: Simon & Schuster. ISBN 978-0743201698.
- Carson, Annette (2001). Jeff Beck: Crazy Fingers. San Francisco: Backbeat Books. ISBN 0-87930-632-7.
- Clayson, Alan (2002). The Yardbirds. San Francisco: Backbeat Books. ISBN 0-87930-724-2.
- Di Perna, Alan (2012). Guitar Masters: Intimate Portraits. Hal Leonard. ISBN 978-1423489887.
- Eden (12 February 1966). "DISCussion". KRLA Beat. Vol. 1, no. 48. BEAT Publications.
- Eder, Bruce (2003). Bogdanov, Vladimir (ed.). All Music Guide to the Blues. San Francisco: Miller Freeman Books. ISBN 978-0-87930-736-3.
- French, David (2020). Heart Full of Soul: Keith Relf of the Yardbirds. Jefferson, North Carolina: McFarland & Company. ISBN 978-1-4766-8011-8.
- Hall, Mitchell K. (2014). The Emergence of Rock and Roll: Music and the Rise of American Youth Culture. New York City: Routledge. ISBN 978-1135053581.
- Houghton, Mick (2010). Becoming Elektra: True Story of Jac Holzman's Visionary Record Label. London: Jawbone Press. ISBN 978-1-906002-29-9.
- Koda, Cub; Russo, Gregg (2001). Ultimate! (Boxed set booklet). The Yardbirds. Los Angeles: Rhino Records. OCLC 781357622. R2 79825.
- Lewis, Dave; Pallett, Simon (2005). Led Zeppelin: The Concert File. London: Omnibus Press. ISBN 1-84449-659-7.
- MacDonald, Ian (2007). Revolution in the Head: The Beatles Records and the Sixties. Chicago: Chicago Review Press. ISBN 978-1556527333.
- O'Leary, Chris (2015). Rebel Rebel: All the Songs of David Bowie from '64 to '76. Winchester: Zero Books. ISBN 978-1-78099-244-0.
- Perone, James E. (2009). Mods, Rockers, and the Music of the British Invasion. Westport, Connecticut: Greenwood Publishing Group. ISBN 978-0275998608.
- Power, Martin (2011). Hot Hired Guitar: The Life of Jeff Beck. London: Omnibus Press. ISBN 978-1-84938-869-6.
- Roby, Steven (2012). Hendrix on Hendrix: Interviews and Encounters with Jimi Hendrix. Chicago: Chicago Review Press. ISBN 978-1-61374-322-5.
- Russo, Greg (2016). Yardbirds: The Ultimate Rave-Up. Floral Park, New York: Crossfire Publications. ISBN 978-0-9791845-7-4.
- Russo, Greg; Paytress, Mark (2011). Glimpses 1963–1968 (Boxed set booklet). The Yardbirds. Easy Action. EARS 035.
- Santoro, Gene (1991). Beckology (Boxed set booklet). Jeff Beck. New York City: Epic Records/Legacy Recordings. OCLC 144959074. 48661.
- Shadwick, Keith (2003). Jimi Hendrix: Musician (1st. ed.). San Francisco: Backbeat Books. ISBN 0-87930-764-1.
- Shadwick, Keith (2005). Led Zeppelin: The Story of a Band and Their Music 1968–1980 (1st. ed.). San Francisco: Backbeat Books. ISBN 978-0-87930-871-1.
- Simonelli, David (2013). Working Class Heroes: Rock Music and British Society in the 1960s and 1970s. Lanham, Maryland: Lexington Books. ISBN 978-0739170519.
- Unterberger, Richie (2002). "Psychedelic Rock". In Bogdanov, Vladimir; Woodstra, Chris; Erlewine, Stephen Thomas (eds.). All Music Guide to Rock: The Definitive Guide to Rock, Pop, and Soul (3rd ed.). San Francisco: Backbeat Books. ISBN 978-0879306533.
