= Five Live Yardbirds =

Live album by the Yardbirds
- Released: 4 December 1964
- Recorded: 20 March 1964
- Venue: Marquee Club, London
- Genre: Blues rock, R&B
- Length: 42:11
- Label: Columbia
- Producer: Giorgio Gomelsky

The Yardbirds UK chronology
Five Live Yardbirds (1964)	Yardbirds (1966)

Five Live Yardbirds is the live debut album by the English rock band the Yardbirds. It features the group's interpretations of ten American blues and rhythm and blues songs, including their most popular live number, Howlin' Wolf's "Smokestack Lightning". The album contains some of the earliest recordings with guitarist Eric Clapton.

Recorded at the Marquee Club in London on 20 March 1964, it was released in the United Kingdom by Columbia Records nine months later. Despite several favourable retrospective reviews, the album did not reach the UK albums chart. It was not issued in the United States; however, four songs were included on the Yardbirds' second American album, Having a Rave Up.

== Background and recording ==
In October 1963, the Yardbirds took over the Rolling Stones' position at the Crawdaddy Club and had signed a management contract with club owner Giorgio Gomelsky. After touring with Sonny Boy Williamson II, the band signed a contract with Columbia Records. In 1964, they recorded two singles, "I Wish You Would" and "Good Morning Little Schoolgirl". These had limited success and Gomelsky was able to persuade Columbia to release a live album as the Yardbirds' debut album.

The Yardbirds were a popular live attraction at music clubs. Much of their reputation was built on their use of a "rave up" musical arrangement, an instrumental interlude that builds to a climax. Clapton credits the rave up to bassist Paul Samwell-Smith and explains: "While most other bands were playing three-minute songs, we were taking three-minute numbers and stretching them out to five or six minutes, during which time the audience would go crazy". It was at such performances that Clapton often broke a guitar string. While he was putting on a new one, the audience would slowly clap their hands (slow handclapping). This led manager Gomelsky to nickname him "Eric 'Slowhand' Clapton".

Five Live Yardbirds was recorded at the Marquee Club in London. Yardbirds' biographer Gregg Russo describes the conditions and equipment for recording at the club as less than ideal, but they were able to capitalise on their greater popularity compared to the Crawdaddy. He adds:

The recording date for the album has been previously listed as Tuesday, 10 March 1964, but Gomelsky distinctly remembers the show taking place at Wardour Street. On 10 March, the club was still at Oxford Street, and combined with the fact that the Yardbirds played on Fridays at the Wardour Street location, the 20 March 1964 recording date seems much more likely.

== Composition and musical style ==
All of the songs that appear on Five Live Yardbirds were written by American blues and rhythm and blues artists and several of the original recordings appeared on the American record charts. The band's early material reflects the repertoires of the early British rhythm and blues groups, such as the Rolling Stones and the Animals. Clapton biographer David Bowling described the album as "a lot of straight electric blues, but at times they come close to a rock sound." Their version of Chuck Berry's "Too Much Monkey Business", which is the album opener, is the most rock-oriented song on the album.

Several songs feature extended instrumental improvisation. Bo Diddley's "Here 'Tis" and the Isley Brothers' "Respectable" are high-energy tunes, which represent the use of the double-time feature of the rave up for the entire songs. AllMusic critic Matthew Greenwald describes "Here 'Tis" as "driven by a furious "Bo Diddley" beat and rhythm ... Clapton's interplay with bassist Paul Samwell-Smith is one of the great moments in the band's recorded history". The instrumental spotlight was also shared with singer and blues harmonica player Keith Relf. Clapton and Relf trading riffs is one of the highlights of "Smokestack Lightning". The Howlin' Wolf song was the Yardbirds' most popular live number and a regular in their sets. Performances of the song could last up to 30 minutes. Howlin' Wolf reportedly referred to the group's 5:35 album version as "the definitive version of his song".

The slow blues standard, "Five Long Years", features extended guitar soloing by Clapton in a style he further developed with John Mayall & the Bluesbreakers. Clapton and Samwell-Smith share the lead vocals on "Good Morning Little Schoolgirl", which is based on the version by the American R&B duo Don and Bob. Bo Diddley's "I'm a Man" (which became a hit when the Yardbirds later recorded it with Jeff Beck) and songs by Slim Harpo and John Lee Hooker round out the album.

== Release and critical reception ==
Professional ratings
Review scores
Source	Rating
All Music Guide to the Blues	4.5/5 stars
AllMusic	4.5/5 stars
Rolling Stone	3/5 stars

Columbia Graphophone Company issued Five Live Yardbirds in the UK on 4 December 1964. Clapton biographer Christopher Sandford writes that when the album was released "to generally favourable reviews ('Raucous interplay ... great guitar ... feral energy of the ensemble') it, too, failed to materially benefit the group." The album did not appear in the British record chart. Subsequently, it was not issued in the US, but in November 1965 Epic Records (their American label) included four of the tracks on Having a Rave Up with the Yardbirds. In 1966, Epic planned to release the album in the US with the same tracks as the UK album (although with different cover art), but did not follow through.

Later critics have given favourable reviews. AllMusic's Eder awarded it four and a half out of five stars and described it as "the first important – indeed, essential – live album to come out of the 1960s British rock & roll boom. In terms of the performance captured and the recording quality, it was also the best such live record of the entire middle of the decade". In a separate review for AllMusic, Rick Clark noted "Smokestack Lightning" [and other songs] were open-ended improvisations that helped lay the groundwork for groups like Cream and the Jimi Hendrix Experience." Bowling calls the material "raw and powerful" and Russo adds that it is "a completely faithful reproduction" of the group's early shows. Ultimate Classic Rock included the album in its list of "Top 100 Live Albums", calling it an "explosive document of a British blues band fueling a decidedly American music with power, fireworks and amped-up resourcefulness".

Aerosmith's Joe Perry described himself as "a huge fan of Clapton's work on Five Live Yardbirds. Their version of Chuck Berry's 'Too Much Monkey Business' was such a blueprint for a lot of what Aerosmith tried to do. The 'Rave Ups' [instrumental interludes] which were backing up Eric, the solos – it was like the band was a slingshot and, as soon as it hit that pocket, he went sailing. Those parts of the songs still give me goosebumps."

== Track listing ==
=== Side one ===
1. "Too Much Monkey Business" (Chuck Berry) – 3:51
2. "Got Love If You Want It" (Slim Harpo) – 2:40
3. "Smokestack Lightning" (Howlin' Wolf) – 5:35
4. "Good Morning Little Schoolgirl" (H. G. Demarais) – 2:42
5. "Respectable" (O'Kelly Isley, Ronald Isley, Rudolph Isley) – 5:35

=== Side two ===
6. "Five Long Years" (Eddie Boyd) – 5:18
7. "Pretty Girl" (Ellas McDaniel) – 3:04
8. "Louise" (John Lee Hooker) – 3:43
9. "I'm a Man" (McDaniel) – 4:33
10. "Here 'Tis" (McDaniel) – 5:10

=== 2003 bonus tracks ===
11. "You Can't Judge a Book by Looking at the Cover" (Willie Dixon) – 2:56
12. "Let It Rock" (Berry) – 2:16
13. "I Wish You Would" (Billy Boy Arnold) – 5:53
14. "Who Do You Love?" (McDaniel) – 4:07
15. "Honey in Your Hips" (Keith Relf) – 2:27
16. "A Certain Girl" (Naomi Neville) – 2:17
17. "Got to Hurry" (O. Rasputin) – 2:47
18. "Boom Boom" (Hooker) – 2:24
19. "I Ain't Got You" (Calvin Carter) – 1:59
20. "Good Morning Little Schoolgirl" (Studio Version) – 2:44

Tracks 11 to 15 recorded at the Crawdaddy Club in Richmond, Surrey, England on 8 December 1963.

Tracks 16, 19-20, released in 1964, are singles.

Tracks 17-18, released in 1965, are singles.

== Personnel ==
The Yardbirds

- Eric "Slowhand" Clapton – lead guitar, co-lead vocals on "Good Morning Little Schoolgirl"
- Chris Dreja – rhythm guitar
- Jim McCarty – drums
- Keith Relf – lead vocals (except on "Good Morning Little Schoolgirl"), harmonica, maracas
- Paul "Sam" Samwell-Smith – bass guitar, co-lead vocals on "Good Morning Little Schoolgirl"

Production

- Giorgio Gomelsky – producer, liner notes
- Phillip Wood – engineer, sound effects engineer
- Bill Inglot – digital remastering
- Richard Rosser – photography

== Bibliography ==
- Bowling, David (2013). Eric Clapton FAQ: All That's Left to Know About Slowhand. Hal Leonard. ISBN 978-1617135743.
- Brackett, Nathan; Hoard, Christian David (2004). The New Rolling Stone Album Guide. Simon & Schuster. ISBN 978-0743201698.
- Casabona, Helen, ed. (1989). Rock Guitar. Hal Leonard. ISBN 978-0881889086.
- Clapton, Eric (2007). Clapton: The Autobiography. Broadway Books. ISBN 978-0-7679-2536-5.
- Clark, Rick (1996). "The Yardbirds". In Erlewine, Michael; Bogdanov, Vladimir; Woodstra, Chris; Koda, Cub (eds.). All Music Guide to the Blues. Miller Freeman Books. ISBN 0-87930-424-3.
- Clayson, Alan (2002). The Yardbirds. Backbeat Books. ISBN 0-87930-724-2.
- di Perna, Alan (2012). Guitar Masters: Intimate Portraits. Hal Leonard. ISBN 978-1480329706.
- Gomelsky, Giorgio; Cohen, Phil (2002). The Yardbirds Story (Boxed set booklet). The Yardbirds. Charly Records. OCLC 62367983. SNAD 905 CD.
- Hulett, Ralph; Prochnicky, Jerry (2011). Whole Lotta Led: Our Flight with Led Zeppelin. Kensington Publishing. ISBN 978-0806535555.
- Hicks, Michael (2000). Sixties Rock: Garage, Psychedelic, and Other Satisfactions. University of Illinois Press. ISBN 978-0252069154.
- Koda, Cub; Russo, Gregg (2001). Ultimate! (Boxed set booklet). The Yardbirds. Rhino Records. OCLC 781357622. R2 79825.
- Russo, Greg (2016). Yardbirds: The Ultimate Rave-Up (6th. ed.). Crossfire Publications. ISBN 978-0-9791845-7-4.
- Sandford, Christopher (1999). Clapton, Edge of Darkness. Da Capo Press. ISBN 978-0306808975.
- Schumacher, Michael (2003). Crossroads: The Life and Music of Eric Clapton. Citadel Press. ISBN 978-0806524665.
