= Beckology =

Box set by Jeff Beck
- Released: 19 November 1991
- Recorded: 1963–1989
- Genre: Rock; blues
- Length: 223:48
- Label: Epic / Legacy

Jeff Beck chronology
Jeff Beck's Guitar Shop (1989)	Beckology (1991)	Frankie's House (1992)

Beckology by guitarist Jeff Beck was released in 1991 as a 3 CD career retrospective. Beckology covers the work of a guitarist widely acknowledged as one of the most influential and gifted exponents of the electric guitar, from early days with The Tridents through to his Guitar Shop album in 1989.

- Volume 1 includes previously unreleased tracks from The Tridents, earthy mono recordings of Yardbirds classics like "Steeled Blues" and "Heart Full of Soul", four tracks from a Yardbirds BBC session, and Jeff's first solo single sides.
- Volume 2 covers both incarnations of The Jeff Beck Group which each released two albums and finishes with Beck, Bogert and Appice tunes. Highlights here include the reworking of the Yardbirds' "Shapes of Things" with Rod Stewart on vocals, the driving "Plynth", the beautiful guitar work on "Definitely Maybe" and the reworking of Stevie Wonder's "Superstition".
- Volume 3 tracks through what the sleeve notes call the "instrumental era" of the 1970s with tracks from the jazzy Blow by Blow and the acclaimed George Martin produced Wired albums. There is a live performance of "Freeway Jam" from 1977 with Jan Hammer, with whom Jeff had been touring and collaborating.

A 60-page booklet comes with the album, and includes a biography by Gene Santoro.

== Reception ==
Professional ratings
Review scores
Source	Rating
Allmusic	4.5/5 stars
Uncut	3/5 stars

Allmusic gave an enthusiastically positive review of the set, asserting that the mastering quality is far superior to any previous release while applauding the selection of material: "to survey Jeff Beck's entire career […] would be a hopeless task, given the amount of anonymous session work that the guitarist did circa 1964–1966, but Beckology still manages to touch a few unexpected bases, even as it strings together all of the obvious and most of the important sides in Beck's output."

== Track listing ==
Volume One

1. "Trouble in Mind" – The Tridents (unreleased)
2. "Nursery Rhyme" (live) (Bo Diddley) – The Tridents (unreleased)
3. "Wandering Man Blues" – The Tridents (unreleased)
4. "Steeled Blues" – The Yardbirds (B-side of Heart Full Of Soul single)
5. "Heart Full of Soul" – The Yardbirds (4th single, from Having A Rave Up With The Yardbirds)
6. "I'm Not Talking" – The Yardbirds (For Your Love)
7. "I Ain't Done Wrong" – The Yardbirds (For Your Love)
8. "Train Kept a Rollin'" – The Yardbirds (Having A Rave Up With The Yardbirds)
9. "I'm a Man" (Bo Diddley) – The Yardbirds (Having A Rave Up With The Yardbirds)
10. "Shapes of Things" – The Yardbirds (6th single, from Greatest Hits)
11. "Over Under Sideways Down" – The Yardbirds (7th single, from Yardbirds/Over Under Sideways Down)
12. "Happenings Ten Years Time Ago" – The Yardbirds (8th single, from Greatest Hits)
13. "Hot House of Omagarashid" – The Yardbirds (Yardbirds/Over Under Sideways Down)
14. "Lost Woman" – The Yardbirds (Yardbirds/Over Under Sideways Down)
15. "Rack My Mind" – The Yardbirds (Yardbirds)
16. "The Nazz Are Blue" – The Yardbirds (B-side of Happenings Ten Years Time Ago single (US))
17. "Psycho Daisies" – The Yardbirds (B-side of Happenings Ten Years Time Ago single (UK))
18. "Jeff's Boogie" – The Yardbirds (Yardbirds/Over Under Sideways Down)
19. "Too Much Monkey Business" (live) – The Yardbirds (BBC Studios, 1965)
20. "The Sun Is Shining" (live) – The Yardbirds (BBC Studios, 1966)
21. "You're a Better Man Than I" (live) – The Yardbirds (BBC Studios, 1965)
22. "Love Me Like I Love You" (live) – The Yardbirds (BBC Studios, 1965)
23. "Hi Ho Silver Lining" – Jeff Beck (1st solo single)
24. "Tally Man" – Jeff Beck (2nd solo single)
25. "Beck's Bolero" – Jeff Beck (Truth)

Volume Two

1. "Shapes of Things" – The Jeff Beck Group (Truth)
2. "I Ain't Superstitious" – The Jeff Beck Group (Truth)
3. "Rock My Plimsoul" – The Jeff Beck Group (B-side of Tally Man single)
4. "Jailhouse Rock" – The Jeff Beck Group (Beck-Ola)
5. "Plynth (Water Down the Drain)" – The Jeff Beck Group (Beck-Ola)
6. "I've Been Drinking" – The Jeff Beck Group (B-side of Love is Blue single)
7. "Definitely Maybe" – The Jeff Beck Group (Jeff Beck Group)
8. "New Ways Train Train" – The Jeff Beck Group (Rough And Ready)
9. "Going Down" – The Jeff Beck Group (Jeff Beck Group)
10. "I Can't Give Back the Love I Feel for You" – The Jeff Beck Group (Jeff Beck Group)
11. "Superstition" – Beck Bogert Appice (Beck, Bogert, Appice)
12. "Black Cat Moan" (live) – Beck Bogert Appice (Beck, Bogert, Appice Live)
13. "Blues Deluxe/BBA Boogie" (live) – Beck Bogert Appice (previously unreleased)
14. "Jizz Whizz" – Beck Bogert Appice (previously unreleased)

Volume Three

1. "'Cause We've Ended as Lovers" – Jeff Beck (Blow By Blow)
2. "Goodbye Pork Pie Hat" – Jeff Beck (Wired)
3. "Love Is Green" – Jeff Beck (Wired)
4. "Diamond Dust" – Jeff Beck (Blow By Blow)
5. "Freeway Jam" (live) – Jeff Beck (Jeff Beck With The Jan Hammer Group Live)
6. "The Pump" – Jeff Beck (There And Back)
7. "People Get Ready" – Jeff Beck featuring Rod Stewart (Flash)
8. "Escape" – Jeff Beck (Flash)
9. "Gets Us All in the End" – Jeff Beck (Flash)
10. "Back on the Street" – Jeff Beck (B-side of People Get Ready single)
11. "Wild Thing" – Jeff Beck (UK single release only)
12. "Train Kept A-Rollin'" – Jeff Beck (Twins soundtrack)
13. "Sleep Walk" – Jeff Beck (Porky's Revenge! soundtrack)
14. "The Stumble" – Jeff Beck (Twins soundtrack)
15. "Big Block" – Jeff Beck (Jeff Beck's Guitar Shop)
16. "Where Were You" – Jeff Beck (Jeff Beck's Guitar Shop)
