= Roger the Engineer =

Yardbirds
- UK release

Studio album by the Yardbirds
- Released: 15 July 1966
- Recorded: 19 April – 14 June 1966
- Studios: Advision, London
- Genres: Psychedelic rock; freakbeat; blues rock
- Length: 35:52 (14-track version)
- Label: Columbia
- Producers: Simon Napier-Bell; Paul Samwell-Smith

The Yardbirds UK chronology
Five Live Yardbirds (1964)	Yardbirds (1966)	Remember (1971)

The Yardbirds US chronology
Having a Rave Up with the Yardbirds (1965)	Over Under Sideways Down (1966)	The Yardbirds Greatest Hits (1967)

Alternative covers
- US release

Roger the Engineer (originally released in the UK as Yardbirds and in the US, West Germany, France and Italy as Over Under Sideways Down) is the only UK studio album and the third US album by the English rock band the Yardbirds. Recorded and released in 1966, it contains all original material and is the only Yardbirds album with guitarist Jeff Beck on all tracks. It was produced by bassist Paul Samwell-Smith and manager Simon Napier-Bell.

Although the British edition is still officially titled Yardbirds by authoritative chart sources, such as Official Charts Company, it has since been referred to, first colloquially, then semi-officially, as Roger the Engineer, a title stemming from the cover drawing of the record's audio engineer Roger Cameron by band member Chris Dreja.

== Background ==
The Yardbirds' debut album in December 1964 had been a live release appropriately titled Five Live Yardbirds. With the arrival of Jeff Beck in the group in March 1965, a series of popular and innovative hit singles established the group as a major British Invasion act, with extensive touring in the United States. Anticipation for the group's first studio LP was high, although it wasn't until March 1966 that they entered Advision Studios in London to attempt initial recordings. Ten instrumental tracks were laid down with working titles like "Someone To Love" (renamed "Lost Women"), "Pounds and Stomps" (an early "He's Always There"), "Jeff's Blues" (renamed "The Nazz Are Blue"), "Like Jimmy Reed Again", "Chris' Number", "Crimson Curtain", and "What Do You Want" with the provisional album title An Eye View of Beat. Before vocals and other overdubs could be added, the sessions were scrapped when the group switched managers from Giorgio Gomelsky to Simon Napier-Bell. Most of these aborted tracks would be released on later Gomelsky archival compilations.

== Recording ==
The first product produced under the aegis of Napier-Bell was the single "Over Under Sideways Down" along with its B-side "Jeff's Boogie", which were recorded at Advision from 19–20 April 1966. The single was released on 27 May and performed well, charting at number 10 in the UK and number 13 in the US. It continued in the pioneering psychedelic vein of the previous "Shapes of Things", with Beck conjuring a distorted Eastern-inspired fuzz guitar hook that contrasted with the 1950s boogie-style walking bass line he also came up with. The flip side, "Jeff's Boogie", was based on Chuck Berry's "Guitar Boogie" and allowed Beck to show off his considerable guitar prowess; it would become a live favorite with The Jeff Beck Group.

The bulk of the album was recorded at Advision from 31 May to 4 June 1966 with bassist Paul Samwell-Smith and Napier-Bell co-producing. Roger Cameron was the engineer, although the final session at IBC on 14 June which produced "I Can't Make Your Way" saw Glyn Johns take his place. Although Samwell-Smith played bass on about half the album's tracks, the group hired Mick Fitzpatrick to play on the rest. The band reworked four tracks from the aborted March Gomelsky sessions ("Lost Women", "The Nazz Are Blue", "He's Always There" and "What Do You Want") and added six more, most of which were quickly written in the studio. Samwell-Smith later complained that the group only had five days to complete the album, and wondered how great it might have been if they had been given one month. The typical method of working in the studio was to have the band members work out the basic backing tracks and then, after many hours had passed, allow Beck the freedom to add guitar overdubs as he saw fit. According to Beck:

"I would sit around twiddling my fingers in anger waiting for my chance to get in and rip it in half. And they used to watch the flame build and build until I really couldn't take it. And then we'd all laugh and have a drink afterwards."

Musically, the album continued in the vein of their recent run of hit singles including blues-based numbers ("The Nazz Are Blue", "Rack My Mind"), riff-driven hard rock ("He's Always There", "What Do You Want"), lysergic rave-ups ("Lost Woman") Gregorian chant ("Turn Into Earth"), and exotic psychedelia (the instrumental "Hot House of Omagararshid"). In addition, Keith Relf contributed the sensitive piano ballad "Farewell" with accompanying social commentary on modern life. Beck's guitar solos experimented with fuzz, feedback, reverb and Eastern modes, played on a recently purchased Gibson Les Paul Sunburst that he had seen Eric Clapton using with the Bluesbreakers.

== Release ==
Yardbirds was released by the Columbia Gramophone Company in the UK on 15 July 1966 and by Epic Records in the US on 18 July 1966. It is the only Yardbirds album to appear in the UK Albums Chart, where it reached number 20. In the US, it reached number 52 on the Billboard 200 album chart, making it the band's highest-charting studio album in that country. It reached number 8 in Finland.

The original American version (issued with a different album cover and titled Over Under Sideways Down after the hit song of the same name) omitted the songs "The Nazz Are Blue" (sung by Jeff Beck) and "Rack My Mind" and is mixed differently than the British editions. Regardless, record collectors have sought out both the mono (LN 24210) and stereo (BN 26210) versions since several tracks are featured with slight differences in the mixes (see US album listing below). Epic's 1983 reissue (simply titled The Yardbirds) featured the original UK album cover, the two missing tracks, duplication of the British mixing, and two additional tracks: the October 1966 single "Happenings Ten Years Time Ago" backed with "Psycho Daisies" which feature both Jeff Beck and Jimmy Page on guitar.

In 2021, Demon Records released a "super deluxe" version of Roger the Engineer including the mono and stereo versions on LP and CD with extra tracks and plethora of outtakes (including a working version of "Turn Into Earth" with a lost guitar solo) along with a replica of the "Happenings Ten Years Time Ago"/"Psycho Daisies" single.

== Reception and legacy ==
Professional ratings
Review scores
Source	Rating
AllMusic	4.5/5 stars

Upon release, Record Mirror ran a positive track-by-track review of the album. Reviewer Richard Green noted "all the tracks have been produced well and there's nothing I can think of to fault them on", before concluding the importance of Jeff Beck to the group and predicting it would be a hit. In a retrospective AllMusic review, Stephen Thomas Erlewine considers the album to be "the Yardbirds' best individual studio album, offering some of their very best psychedelia", though not "among the great albums of its era".

In the liner notes to the box set Beckology, Gene Santoro notes that the band had "forged a new musical synthesis of Eastern sounds, jazz, blues, rock and noise. The rave up section of "Lost Women" rides out on a recurring feedback-and-whistle sound of power chords; the first section of the "Nazz Are Blue" solo closes out with a single sustained note spiraling into feedback--and this before Jimi Hendrix's revolutionary Are You Experienced?. Writing for Ultimate Classic Rock, Michael Gallucci similarly touts it as a "monumental work of the era" which "takes the Yardbirds into eye-opening, and mind-expanding new worlds. Roger the Engineer helped set the template for the psychedelic-based hard rock that would emerge over the next couple of years." Overall, the album is praised for providing a blueprint for the styles of hard rock, acid rock, psychedelia and heavy metal months before the first releases by Cream and The Jimi Hendrix Experience.

The album is included in Robert Dimery's 1001 Albums You Must Hear Before You Die. In 2012, the album was ranked number 350 on Rolling Stone's list of the 500 greatest albums of all time.

The American band the Nazz (featuring Todd Rundgren) were named after the song "The Nazz Are Blue".

== Track listing ==
All songs credited to Chris Dreja, Jim McCarty, Jeff Beck, Keith Relf, and Paul Samwell-Smith (Dreja and McCarty's last names are misspelled as "Drega" and "McCarthy" on the labels of the US album), although "Turn into Earth" was penned by Paul Samwell-Smith and Rosemary Simon. All songs are recorded in stereo, except where noted.

Side one
No.	Title	Length
1.	"Lost Woman"	3:16
2.	"Over Under Sideways Down" (Rechanneled)	2:24
3.	"The Nazz Are Blue"	3:04
4.	"I Can't Make Your Way"	2:26
5.	"Rack My Mind"	3:15
6.	"Farewell"	1:29

Side two
No.	Title	Length
7.	"Hot House of Omagararshid"	2:39
8.	"Jeff's Boogie" (Rechanneled)	2:25
9.	"He's Always There"	2:15
10.	"Turn into Earth"	3:06
11.	"What Do You Want"	3:22
12.	"Ever Since the World Began"	2:09

=== US release ===
Side one
No.	Title	Length
1.	"Lost Woman"	3:16
2.	"Over, Under, Sideways, Down"	2:24
3.	"I Can't Make Your Way" (Mono version includes opening beat missing from stereo version)	2:26
4.	"Farewell"	1:29
5.	"Hot House of Omagararshid" (Beck's lead guitar differs noticeably between the two mixes)	2:39

Side two
No.	Title	Length
6.	"Jeff's Boogie"	2:25
7.	"He's Always There" (Longer fadeout and extended vocals at the end of the mono version)	2:15
8.	"Turn into Earth" (12-bar drum opening on mono version, 8-bar opening on stereo version)	3:06
9.	"What Do You Want"	3:22
10.	"Ever Since the World Began"	2:09

== Personnel ==
The Yardbirds

- Keith Relf – lead vocals (except "The Nazz Are Blue"), harmonica, autoharp on "Over, Under, Sideways, Down", acoustic guitar on "Hot House Of Omagararshid", güiro on "I Can’t Make Your Way", "Hot House Of Omagararshid" and "He's Always There"
- Jeff Beck – lead guitar, lead vocals on "The Nazz Are Blue", bass guitar on "Over, Under, Sideways, Down", percussion on "Hot House Of Omagararshid"
- Chris Dreja – rhythm guitar, piano, wobble board on "Hot House Of Omagararshid", backing vocals
- Paul Samwell-Smith – bass guitar on "Lost Woman", "The Nazz Are Blue", "Rack My Mind", "Jeff's Boogie" and "What Do You Want", backing vocals
- Jim McCarty – drums, percussion, backing vocals

Additional musicians

- Michael (Mick) Fitzpatrick - bass guitar on "I Can’t Make Your Way", "Farewell", "Hot House Of Omagararshid" "He's Always There", "Turn Into Earth" and "Ever Since The World Began"

Cover art

- Chris Dreja – cover design and artwork
- Jim McCarty – sleeve notes

Region	Date	Title	Label	Format	Catalog
UK	07/1966	Yardbirds	Columbia	stereo LP	SCX6063
UK	07/1966	Yardbirds	Columbia	mono LP	SX6063
US	08/1966	Over Under Sideways Down	Epic	stereo LP	BN 26210
US	08/1966	Over Under Sideways Down	Epic	mono LP	LN 24210
FRG	1966	Over Under Sideways Down	Epic	stereo LP	BN 26254
France	1966	Over Under Sideways Down	Riviera	LP	231196
Canada	1966	Over Under Sideways Down	Capitol	LP	ST 6202
England	1983	Roger the Engineer	Edsel	LP	ED 116
US	1983	Yardbirds	Epic	LP	FE 38455
US	11/1997	Roger the Engineer	Warner Archive	CD	WB 457342

== Chart performance ==
Weekly chart performance for The Yardbirds / Over Under Sideways Down
Chart (1966–67)	Peak position
Finnish Mitä Suomi Soittaa? Albums chart	8
UK Disc and Music Echo Top Ten LPs	9
UK Melody Maker Top Ten LPs	9
UK New Musical Express Best Selling LPs in Britain	7
UK Record Retailer LPs Chart	20
US Billboard Top LP's	52
US Cash Box Top 100 Albums	34
US Record World Top 100 LP's	32
