= Eldorado Cadillac =

Studio album by Billy Boy Arnold
- Released: 1995
- Genre: Chicago blues
- Label: Alligator
- Producer: Billy Boy Arnold, Bruce Iglauer, Scott Dirks

Billy Boy Arnold chronology
Goin' to Chicago (1995)	Eldorado Cadillac (1995)	Catfish (1999)

Eldorado Cadillac is an album by the American musician Billy Boy Arnold, released in 1995. It was the second album of his 1990s comeback. Arnold considered his two Alligator Records albums to be the best of his career. The album won a National Association of Independent Record Distributors award for best blues album.

== Production ==
Eldorado Cadillac was produced by Arnold, Bruce Iglauer, and Scott Dirks. Arnold wrote seven new songs for the album. Carl Sonny Leyland contributed on piano; Bob Margolin played slide guitar. "Don't Stay Out All Night" is a rerecording of Arnold's first single, from 1955. "Sunny Road" is a cover of the Roosevelt Sykes song.

== Critical reception ==
Professional ratings
Review scores
Source	Rating
AllMusic	4/5 stars
Chicago Tribune	3/4 stars
DownBeat	5/5 stars
MusicHound Blues: The Essential Album Guide	4/5 stars
The Penguin Guide to Blues Recordings	3/4 stars
Vancouver Sun	3/4 stars
The Virgin Encyclopedia of the Blues	3/5 stars

The Vancouver Sun wrote that "the star of this show is Arnold's straight-ahead harp playing in a style inspired by Sonny Boy Williamson... The sound he wrenches from the instrument—raunchy distortion with a touch of reverb—just about defines Chicago blues." The Washington Post said that Arnold and his band "forego the stomp rhythms of Muddy Waters and Willie Dixon for a bluesy, greasy swing that's pure pleasure." The Chicago Tribune concluded that "Arnold's vocal range throughout Eldorado Cadillac is undeniably deeper and fuller than it was in 1956, but his outlook is happily the same."

The Times Colonist determined that "Arnold uses adept vocal phrasing to add a dramatic edge to his narrow range, and his blues harp is a haunting, riveting, delicious treat." The Los Angeles Times deemed Eldorado Cadillac "a solid, sweaty blues collection." The Santa Cruz Sentinel praised Arnold's "distorted harmonica and cool singing."

AllMusic called the album "a fun set of passionate Chicago blues."

== Track listing ==
No.	Title	Length
1.	"I Ain't Got You"
2.	"Sunday Morning Blues"
3.	"Don't Stay Out All Night"
4.	"Lowdown Thing or Two"
5.	"Been Gone Too Long"
6.	"Mama's Bitter Seed"
7.	"Man of Considerable Taste"
8.	"How Long Can This Go On?"
9.	"Too Many Old Flames"
10.	"Slick Chick"
11.	"It Should Have Been Me"
12.	"Sunny Road"
13.	"Loving Mother for You"
