= Billy Boy Arnold =

American blues harmonica player, singer and songwriter (born 1935)

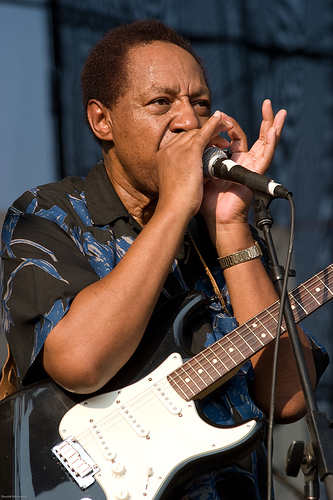
- Arnold in 2007

Background information
- Born: William Arnold; September 16, 1935 (age 90); Chicago, Illinois, U.S.
- Genres: Chicago blues; rhythm and blues
- Occupations: Musician; songwriter
- Instruments: Harmonica; vocals; guitar
- Years active: 1952–present
- Relatives: Jerome Arnold (brother)

William "Billy Boy" Arnold (born September 16, 1935) is an American blues harmonica player, singer, and songwriter. Arnold is a self-taught harmonica player and has worked with blues musicians such as Bo Diddley, Johnny Shines, Otis Rush, Earl Hooker, Howlin' Wolf, Muddy Waters and others.

== Biography ==
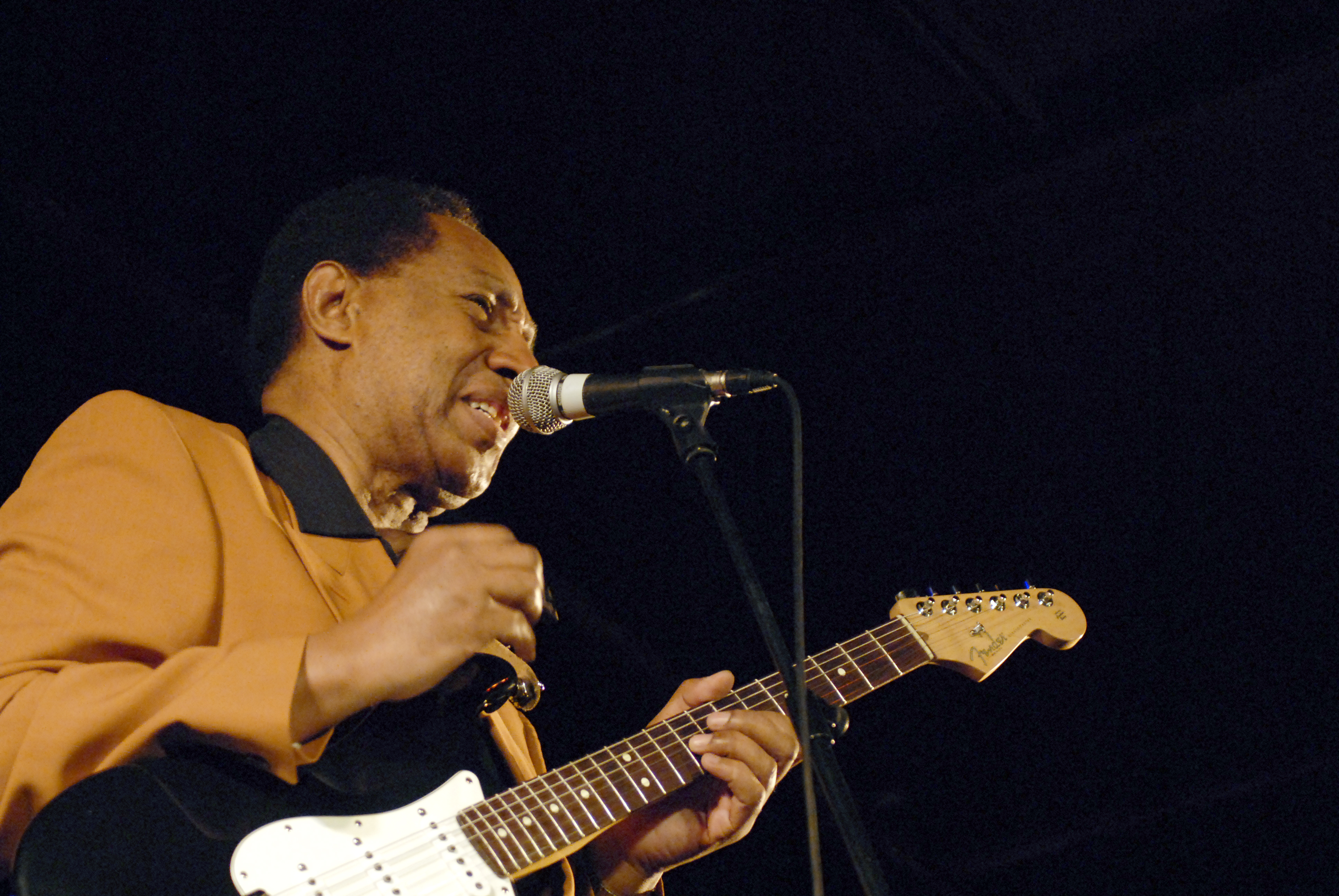
Billy Boy Arnold performing at the International Jazz Festival in Wellington, New Zealand in 2006.

Born in Chicago, Illinois, as one of 16 children, he began playing harmonica as a child, and in 1948 received informal lessons from his neighbor, Sonny Boy Williamson I, shortly before the latter's death. Arnold made his recording debut in 1952 with "Hello Stranger" on the small Cool label, the record company giving him the nickname "Billy Boy".

In the early 1950s, he joined forces with street musician Bo Diddley and played harmonica on the March 2, 1955 recording of the Bo Diddley song "I'm a Man" released by Checker Records. The same day as the Bo Diddley sessions, Arnold recorded the self-penned "You Got to Love Me" which was not released until the box set Chess Blues 1947–1967 in 1992.

Arnold signed a solo recording contract with Vee-Jay Records, recording the originals of "I Wish You Would" and "I Ain’t Got You". Both were later covered by the Yardbirds. "I Wish You Would" was also recorded by David Bowie on his 1973 album Pin Ups and by Sweet on their 1982 album, Identity Crisis.

In the late 1950s Arnold continued to play in Chicago clubs and in 1963 he recorded an LP, More Blues From The South Side, for the Prestige label, but as playing opportunities dried up he pursued a parallel career as a bus driver and, later parole officer.

By the 1970s, Arnold had begun playing festivals, touring Europe and recording again, including as part of the American Blues Legends '75 package organised by Big Bear Music. He recorded a session for BBC Radio 1 disc jockey John Peel on October 5, 1977. He also recorded in 1979 the tracks that later became the Catfish album of 1999, in London with Tony McPhee and the Groundhogs.

In 1993, he released the album Back Where I Belong on Alligator Records, followed by Eldorado Cadillac (1995) and on Stony Plain Records with the Duke Robillard Band Boogie ’n’ Shuffle (2001). In 2012, Arnold released Blue and Lonesome featuring Tony McPhee and the Groundhogs. Another tribute to Arnold was the album The Blues Soul of Billy Boy Arnold (Stony Plain - SPCD 1378, 2014).

In 2014, he was nominated for a Blues Music Award in the "Traditional Blues Male Artist of the Year" category.

In November 2021, the University of Chicago Press published Arnold's first-person memoir, "The Blues Dream of Billy Boy Arnold", written in collaboration with Kim Field.

His younger brother is bassist Jerome Arnold, with whom he has recorded.

== Discography ==
=== Studio albums ===
- More Blues on the South Side (Prestige, 1966)
- Kings of Chicago Blues Vol. 3 (Vogue, 1973)
- Blow the Back Off It (Red Lightnin', 1975)
- Checkin' It Out (Red Lightnin', 1979)
- Ten Million Dollars (Blue Phoenix, 1984)
- Back Where I Belong (Alligator, 1993)
- Eldorado Cadillac (Alligator, 1995)
- Boogie 'n' Shuffle (Stony Plain, 2001)
- Consolidated Mojo (Electro-Fi, 2005)
- Billy Boy Arnold Sings Sonny Boy (Electro-Fi, 2008)
- Billy Boy Arnold Sings Big Bill Broonzy (Electro-Fi, 2012)
- The Blues Soul of Billy Boy Arnold (Stony Plain, 2014)

=== Live albums ===
- Live at the Venue 1990 (Catfish, 2000)

=== Compilation albums ===
- American Blues Legends '75 (with various artists, Big Bear, 1975)
- Crying and Pleading (Charly, 1980)
- Goin' to Chicago (Testament, 1995)
- Catfish (Catfish, 1999)
- Mark Hummel's Blues Harmonica Blowouts – "Still Here and Gone" 1993–2007 (live with various artists, Electro-Fi, 2007)
- Remembering Little Walter (with various artists, Blind Pig, 2013)
