= Fritz Rau =

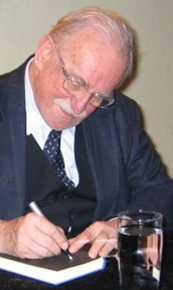
Fritz Rau (2006)

Fritz Rau (9 March 1930 – 19 August 2013) was a German music promoter, who was influential in the development of the appreciation of jazz and blues music in Europe in the 1950s and 1960s, and has since been a leading promoter of rock and pop music. He was nominated to the Blues Hall of Fame in 2012, together with his former business partner Horst Lippmann.

== Life and career ==
Rau was born in Pforzheim, but after the death of his parents moved at the age of ten to live with relatives. He studied in Ettlingen, and later graduated with a degree in law from the University of Heidelberg. He worked as a court clerk in Rhineland-Palatinate, and in a law firm in Neustadt an der Weinstraße, while at the same time becoming involved in running a jazz club, Cave 54, in Heidelberg. In December 1955, he organised his first major concert, featuring Albert Mangelsdorff at Heidelberg Town Hall, where his abilities were noticed by concert agent and promoter Horst Lippmann. Lippmann then hired him to help run the Jazz at the Philharmonic tours of Europe arranged by Norman Granz, and they began to work together regularly from 1957. Rau also became concert organiser of the German Jazz Federation.

In 1962 he and Lippmann established the concert agency "Lippmann + Rau", and organised the first European tour by the American Folk Blues Festival. This brought American blues musicians such as Willie Dixon, Howlin' Wolf, Muddy Waters, Sonny Boy Williamson II, John Lee Hooker, Memphis Slim, T-Bone Walker, Buddy Guy, Otis Rush, Little Brother Montgomery, J.B. Lenoir, Lonnie Johnson, Victoria Spivey, Big Joe Williams, Sleepy John Estes and others to Europe for the first time. Several annual tours by American blues musicians over the following years directly influenced a generation of young musicians, especially in Britain where new bands such as The Rolling Stones and The Yardbirds with an interest in blues music were already emerging. Albums by the AFBF artists were also released on Lippmann and Rau's own Scout and L+R labels. The promotional approach adopted by Lippmann and Rau has been criticised for taking a conservative and romantic view of blues music, and presenting it as a heritage rather than putting in the context of the civil rights movement in the US.

Lippmann and Rau worked together to promote a wide variety of jazz, rock, pop and gospel acts across Europe in the 1970s and 1980s. After Lippmann's death in 1997, Rau worked as an independent promoter and tour organiser, and also helped establish the Lippmann + Rau Music Archive in Lippmann's home town of Eisenach.
