= Evil Hearted You =

1965 song by the Yardbirds

- West German picture sleeve

Single by the Yardbirds
- A-side: "Still I'm Sad" (double A-side)
- Released: 1 October 1965
- Recorded: 26 August 1965
- Studio: Advision Sound, London
- Genre: Rock
- Length: 2:24
- Label: Columbia
- Songwriter(s): Graham Gouldman
- Producer(s): Giorgio Gomelsky

The Yardbirds UK singles chronology
"Heart Full of Soul" (1965)	"Evil Hearted You" / "Still I'm Sad" (1965)	"Shapes of Things" (1966)

"Evil Hearted You" is a 1965 single by the English rock group the Yardbirds. It was written by future 10cc member Graham Gouldman, who also wrote the group's two prior singles, "For Your Love" and "Heart Full of Soul". It reached No. 3 on the main UK singles chart.

== Recording and releases ==
The Yardbirds recorded the song at Advision Studios, London, on 26 August 1965. (Note: Earlier sources, including Alan Clayson, give the recording date as 23 August 1965. Greg Russo, in his 2016 updated Yardbirds' biography, lists it as "26 August 1965" with the explanation: "This information comes directly from the original tape box. These sessions were not recorded on 08/17/65 or 08/23/65 as stated in other publications.") When it was released 1 October 1965 in the UK, "Evil Hearted You", along with the second side, "Still I'm Sad" became a double A-side hit. The Record Retailer singles chart counted both sides and reported it reached number three. The NME singles chart reported the two songs separately – "Evil Hearted You" at number ten and "Still I'm Sad" at number nine. There was no single release in the US, but the song was included on the Yardbirds' second Epic Records album Having a Rave Up, which was released 15 November 1965.

== Critical commentary ==
In her pop music column in Disc Weekly, Penny Valentine thought the decision to release the single as a double A-side was "madness", since "Still I'm Sad" was "super" while "Evil Hearted You" was "so dull".

Among retrospective reviewers, the music critic Cub Koda describes the song as a "minor-key pop classic" and the guitarist Jeff Beck's solo as "equal parts classical and James Bond soundtrack". The biographer Martin Power writes:

"Evil Hearted You" had a hint of Italian composer Ennio Morricone, with Beck's contribution taking it to a whole new level of excitement, his clattering, heavily reverbed guitar and shimmering, two-octave slide solo sounding almost ghostly.

In a review for AllMusic, Richie Unterberger calls the song "one of the gloomiest hit singles in all of 1960s British rock" and adds:

[It] throws in all of Gouldman's mid-'60s bag of tricks: multiple abrupt tempo changes, a haunting Middle Eastern-influenced melody extremely heavy on the minor chords, a lyric abjectly pining for a woman's love, and adroit integration of several contrasting sections.

== Other versions ==
"Evil Hearted You" was recorded by the American group the Human Beinz, prior to changing their name. Unterberger describes it as "a faithful version".

American rock band Pixies recorded a version of the song in Spanish. It was released as a B-side on the "Planet of Sound" single.

== Bibliography ==
- Clayson, Alan (2002). The Yardbirds. San Francisco, California: Backbeat Books. ISBN 0-87930-724-2.
- Koda, Cub; Russo, Gregg (2001). Ultimate! (Boxed set booklet). The Yardbirds. Los Angeles: Rhino Records. OCLC 781357622. R2 79825.
- Power, Martin (2014). Hot Hired Guitar: The Life of Jeff Beck. London: Omnibus Press. ISBN 978-1-78323-386-1.
- Russo, Greg (October 2016). Yardbirds: The Ultimate Rave-Up (6th ed.). West Caldwell, New Jersey: Crossfire Publications. ISBN 978-0-9791845-7-4.
