= American Folk Blues Festival =

Music festival in Europe (1962–1985)

- Event poster
- Genre: Blues, folk music
- Locations: Germany, UK (Manchester, London), France (Paris)
- Years active: 1962–70, 1972, 1980–83, 1985
- Founders: Horst Lippmann, Fritz Rau

The American Folk Blues Festival was a music festival that toured Europe as an annual event for several years beginning in 1962. It introduced audiences in Europe, including the UK, to leading blues performers of the day such as Muddy Waters, Howlin' Wolf, John Lee Hooker and Sonny Boy Williamson, most of whom had never previously performed outside the US. The tours attracted substantial media coverage, including TV shows, and contributed to the growth of the audience for blues music in Europe.

== Background ==
German jazz publicist Joachim-Ernst Berendt first had the idea of bringing original African-American blues performers to Europe. Jazz and rock and roll had become very popular, and both genres drew influences directly back to the blues. Berendt thought that European audiences would flock to concert halls to see them in person.

Promoters Horst Lippmann and Fritz Rau brought this idea to reality. By contacting Willie Dixon, an influential blues composer and bassist from Chicago, they were given access to the blues culture of the southern United States. The first festival was held in 1962, and they continued almost annually until 1972, after an eight-year hiatus reviving the festival in 1980 until its final performance in 1985.

== Performances and audiences ==
The concerts featured some of the leading blues artists of the 1960s, such as Muddy Waters, Howlin' Wolf, Willie Dixon, John Lee Hooker and Sonny Boy Williamson, some playing in unique combinations such as T-Bone Walker playing guitar for pianist Memphis Slim, Otis Rush with Junior Wells, and Sonny Boy Williamson with Muddy Waters. The Festival DVDs include the only known footage of Little Walter, and rare recordings of Hooker playing harmonica instead of his customary guitar.

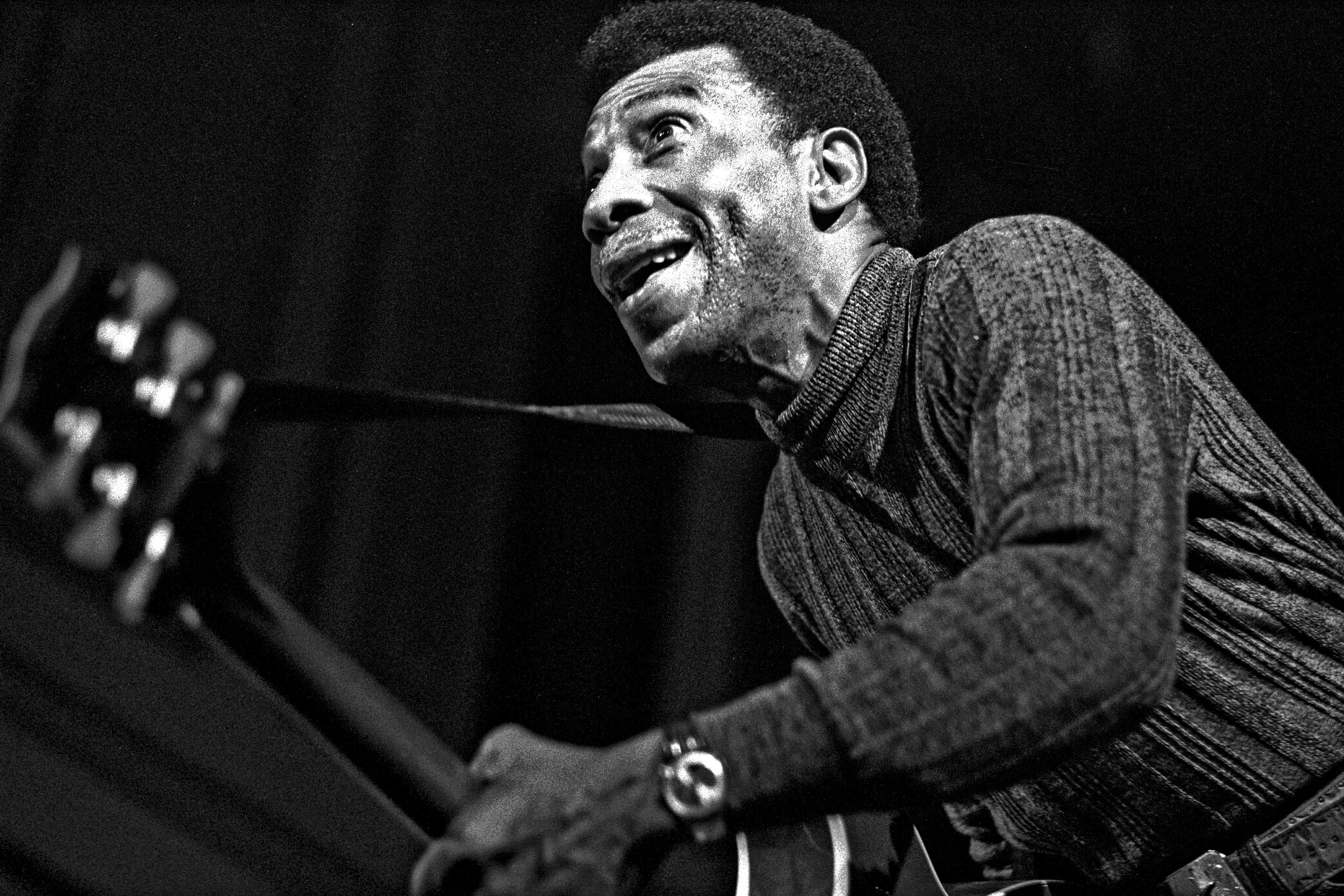
T-Bone Walker at a later iteration of AFBF, 1972

The audience at Manchester in 1962, the first venue for the festival in Britain, included Mick Jagger, Keith Richards, Brian Jones and Jimmy Page. Subsequent attendees at the first London festivals are believed to have also included such influential musicians as Eric Burdon, Eric Clapton, and Steve Winwood. Collectively, these were the primary movers in the blues explosion that would lead to the British Invasion.

Sonny Boy Williamson's visit to London with the 1963 festival led to him spending a year in Europe including recording the Sonny Boy Williamson and the Yardbirds album, (first released on Star-Club Records in 1965), and recording with the Animals.

== Performers ==
Blues musicians who performed on the American Folk Blues Festival tours included Muddy Waters, Sonny Boy Williamson, John Lee Hooker, Sippie Wallace, T-Bone Walker, Sonny Terry & Brownie McGhee, Memphis Slim, Otis Rush, Lonnie Johnson, Eddie Boyd, Big Walter Horton, Junior Wells, Big Joe Williams, Mississippi Fred McDowell, Willie Dixon, Otis Spann, Big Mama Thornton, Bukka White, Jimmy Reed, Howlin' Wolf (with a band made up of Sunnyland Slim, Hubert Sumlin, Willie Dixon and drummer Clifton James), Champion Jack Dupree, Son House, Armand "Jump" Jackson, Skip James, Sleepy John Estes, Little Brother Montgomery, Victoria Spivey, J. B. Lenoir, Little Walter, Carey Bell, Louisiana Red, Lightnin' Hopkins, Joe Turner, Buddy Guy, Magic Sam, Lee Jackson, Matt "Guitar" Murphy, Roosevelt Sykes, Doctor Ross, Koko Taylor, Hound Dog Taylor, Archie Edwards, Helen Humes and Sugar Pie DeSanto.

== Discography ==
Many of the concerts were released on a long-running annual series of records, which was collated again for release in the 1990s.

Official:

- American Folk Blues Festival, 1962–1968
- The Lost Blues Tapes (1993)
- Blues Giants
- American Folk Blues Festival 1970

Available on DVD:

- The American Folk Blues Festival 1962–1966, Vols 1–3 (black and white, recorded live at the Baden-Baden studio of the German public radio and TV network ARD, and (volume 3) of the Danish national broadcaster. The DVD was by Reelin' In The Years Productions.
- American Folk-Blues Festival: The British Tours 1963–1966

Bootleg:

- Muddy Waters – Hoochie Coochie Man (Laserlight Fake)

== See also ==
- List of blues festivals
- List of folk festivals

== Bibliography ==
- The First Time We Met The Blues, David Williams, Music Mentor Books, ISBN 978-0954706814
- Ulrich Adelt (2007). "Germany Get the Blues: Negotiations of Race and Nation at the American Folk Blues Festival". Black, White and Blue: Racial Politics of Blues Music in the 1960s (PhD Thesis). p. 130ff. ISBN 978-0-549-34196-3.
