= Mitchell K. Hall =

American historian

Mitchell K. Hall is professor of history at Central Michigan University. Hall is a specialist in the study of peace and war, and the Vietnam War. He was editor of the journal Peace & Change, and is a past president of the Peace History Society. He taught for two years at Indiana University–Purdue University Indianapolis before arriving at CMU in 1989. joined CMU in 1989.

== Selected publications ==
- The Emergence of Rock and Roll: The Rise of American Youth Culture (New York: Routledge, 2014).
- The Vietnam War Era: People and Perspectives (Santa Barbara: ABC-CLIO, 2009).
- Historical Dictionary of the Nixon-Ford Administrations (Lanham, MD: Scarecrow Press, 2008).
- Crossroads: American Popular Culture and the Vietnam Generation (Lanham, MD: Rowman & Littlefield, 2005).
- The Vietnam War (London: Longman Publishers, 2000; second edition 2007) (Seminar Studies in History). Italian edition, La Guerra del Vietnam (Bologna: Societa editrice il Mulino, 2003).
