= Good Morning, School Girl =

Blues standard first recorded by John Lee "Sonny Boy" Williamson

Single by Sonny Boy Williamson I
- B-side: "Sugar Mama Blues"
- Released: 1937
- Recorded: Aurora, Illinois, May 5, 1937
- Genre: Blues
- Length: 3:00
- Label: Bluebird
- Songwriter: Unknown

"Good Morning, School Girl" is a blues standard that has been identified as an influential part of the blues canon. Pre-war Chicago blues vocalist and harmonica pioneer John Lee "Sonny Boy" Williamson first recorded it in 1937. Subsequently, a variety of artists have recorded versions of the song, usually calling it "Good Morning Little Schoolgirl".

== Original song ==
Sonny Boy Williamson I recorded "Good Morning, School Girl" in 1937 during his first recording session for Bluebird Records. The song is an uptempo blues with an irregular number of bars. Although identified with Chicago blues, a write-up in the Blues Hall of Fame notes "it was a product of Sonny Boy’s west Tennessee roots and his pre-Chicago ensemble work". The melody has been traced to “Back and Side Blues”, a 1934 blues song recorded by Son Bonds. "Good Morning, School Girl" features Williamson's vocal and harmonica with accompaniment by Big Joe Williams and Robert Lee McCoy (also known as Robert Nighthawk) on guitars.

== Blues renditions ==
In October 1948, Leroy Dallas recorded a version of the song, titled "Good Morning Blues". Texas bluesman Smokey Hogg recorded his version, calling it "Little School Girl". In 1950, the song reached number nine on the Billboard Best-Selling Retail Rhythm & Blues Records chart and number five on the magazine's Most Played Juke Box R&B chart. Memphis one-man-band Joe Hill Louis recorded an electric version titled "Good Morning Little Angel" in February or March 1953.

In the late 1950s and early 1960s, several versions of "Good Morning Little Schoolgirl" were recorded as acoustic country-style blues, including versions by John Lee Hooker, Lightnin' Hopkins, Mississippi Fred McDowell, Muddy Waters, and Doctor Ross. In 1965, Junior Wells with Buddy Guy recorded it as a Chicago blues, with a distinctive guitar and bass line, for their influential Hoodoo Man Blues album. McDowell included a 1971 performance on Live in New York and in 1978, Muddy Waters recorded an updated rendition for I'm Ready.

== Rock and R&B adaptations ==
=== Larry Williams version ===
Early rock and roll singer and pianist Larry Williams recorded "Little School Girl" on January 6, 1958 at Radio Recorders in Hollywood, California. Although it uses some of Williamson's lyrics and melody, music writer Gene Sculatti notes the more dance-inspired version. Specialty Records released the song as the B-side to "Ting-A-Ling", with the writer credit listed as "L. Williams".

=== Don and Bob/Yardbirds version ===
"Good Morning, Little Schoolgirl"

Single by Don and Bob
- B-side: "I'm Lost"
- Released: 1961
- Recorded: 1961
- Genre: Rhythm and blues
- Length: 2:25
- Label: Argo
- Songwriters: Don Level, Bob Love

In 1961, Don Level and Bob Love, as the rhythm and blues duo "Don and Bob", recorded a different version of "Good Morning Little Schoolgirl" for Argo Records, a Chess subsidiary. Although they use the phrase "good morning little schoolgirl", the song has different chord changes and lyrics, including references to popular dance styles of the time.

When the Yardbirds were looking for a song to follow up to their first single, "I Wish You Would", they chose the Don and Bob tune. The group's guitarist Eric Clapton explained in an early interview:

[The Yardbirds were] working about every single night of the week. Trouble was finding new material for a disc. We remembered this 'Good Morning Little School Girl' from a rather obscure R and B artiste—a friend of ours had it on a long-player. So we rushed in and recorded it.

The single was released on October 20, 1964, in the UK, where it reached number 44 in the singles chart, the band's first record to do so. Epic Records, the Yardbirds' American label, did not issue the single in the US, but in 1965 included the song on their first U.S. album, For Your Love. Later, in his autobiography, Clapton described the early recordings:

[They] sounded pretty lame. We just sounded young and white, and even though our second single, a cover of a rock version of 'Good Morning Little Schoolgirl', sounded much better, I felt just that we were falling short of the mark in some way. This was not something I felt just about the Yardbirds, but about other bands that I admired, like Manfred Mann, the Moody Blues, and the Animals, all of whom were far better live than they were on recordings.

The group recorded a live version at the Marquee Club in London, which was released on the British debut album, Five Live Yardbirds, in December 1964. On the live version, Clapton and bassist Paul Samwell-Smith provided the vocals instead of lead singer Keith Relf. The Yardbirds single version was credited to "Demarais" or "H.G. Demarais" (Dee Marais, a Shreveport, Louisiana, record label owner/distributor and business associate of Leonard Chess), although some later reissues list Sonny Boy Williamson as the songwriter. Album credits for live version are either listed as Demarais or "Level–Love".

=== Other versions ===
Numerous artists have recorded or performed the song through the years, usually with the title "Good Morning Little Schoolgirl". In 1964, Rod Stewart released his version as his debut solo single for Decca Records. In 1967, the Grateful Dead recorded a version for their self-titled debut album based on Wells' arrangement. Ron "Pigpen" McKernan provided the vocal and harmonica, which an AllMusic reviewer called a "greasy harp-fuelled take". The song was a staple of their early live performances.

English group Ten Years After updated the song with a blues-rock arrangement for their 1969 album Ssssh. In an album review, Jim Newsom noted the seven-minute version included "reworked lyrics leaving little doubt as to what the singer had in mind for the title character".

== Recognition and legacy ==
In 1990, Sonny Boy Williamson's "Good Morning, School Girl" was inducted into the Blues Foundation Hall of Fame in the "Classics of Blues Recordings – Single or Album Track" category.
