= Horst Lippmann =

German jazz musician, concert promoter, writer and television director (1927–1997)

- Born: 17 March 1927; Eisenach, Germany
- Died: 18 May 1997 (aged 70) Frankfurt am Main
- Genres: Jazz
- Occupations: Musician, promoter, writer
- Instrument: Drums

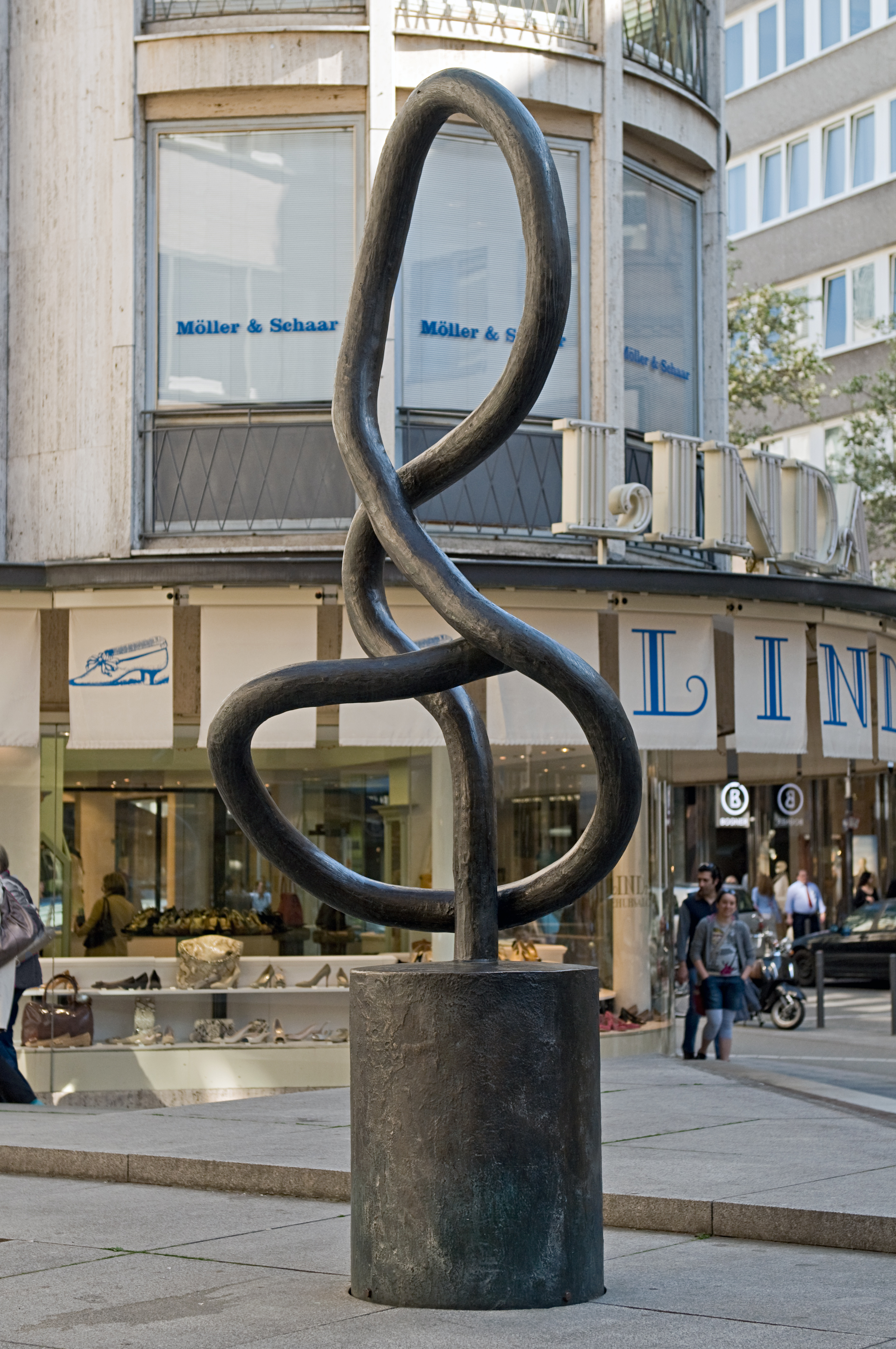
Sculpture Black Clef, created by Taro Miyabe in 1982, at the Horst-Lippmann-Platz in Frankfurt am Main

Horst Lippmann (17 March 1927 in Eisenach, Germany – 18 May 1997 in Frankfurt am Main) was a German jazz musician, concert promoter, writer and television director, best known as promoter of the influential American Folk Blues Festival tours of Europe during and after the 1960s.

== Life ==
The son of a hotelier, Lippmann played drums in the illegal Frankfurter Hot Club in the 1940s, and wrote for one of the first German jazz magazines, Mitteilungen für Freunde der modernen Tanzmusik (Messages for Friends of Modern Dance Music). After the war he played in the combos of the Hot Club with Günter Boaz. Together with Olaf Hudtwalcker, he was involved in the founding of the German Jazz Federation, and organized and participated in concert tours by the West German jazz clubs. In 1953 he founded the German Jazz Festival at Frankfurt.

In the mid-1950s he formed the Lippmann + Rau concert agency with Fritz Rau, and began bringing jazz, blues and rock and roll stars to Germany for the first time. Between 1962 and 1982 he organized the American Folk Blues Festival, initially by contacting Chicago blues musician and songwriter Willie Dixon. The festivals were arranged almost annually during the 1960s, performing in England and France as well as Germany and being recorded for television programmes, and brought such musicians as Muddy Waters, Sonny Boy Williamson, Howlin' Wolf, Lonnie Johnson, Big Joe Williams, John Lee Hooker, Skip James, Little Walter, Buddy Guy, and Memphis Slim before European audiences for the first time. Attendees of early festivals included such influential musicians as Mick Jagger, Eric Burdon, Eric Clapton, and Steve Winwood. Lippmann and Rau entered the Blues Hall of Fame in 2012. They also were the promoters in Germany for Jimi Hendrix in 1969.

Lippmann was also known in Germany as a radio personality and as director of television broadcasts.
