= Smokestack Lightning =

1956 song by Howlin' Wolf

"Smoke Stack Lightning"

Single by Howlin' Wolf
- B-side: "You Can't Be Beat"
- Released: March 1956
- Recorded: January 1956
- Studio: Chess, Chicago
- Genre: Blues
- Length: 2:32
- Label: Chess
- Songwriter: Chester Burnett a.k.a. Howlin' Wolf
- Producers: Leonard Chess, Phil Chess, Willie Dixon

Howlin' Wolf singles chronology
"Come to Me, Baby" (1955)	"Smoke Stack Lightning" (1956)	"I Asked for Water" (1956)

"Smokestack Lightning" (also "Smoke Stack Lightning" or "Smokestack Lightnin'") is a blues song recorded by Howlin' Wolf in 1956. It became one of his most popular and influential songs. It is based on earlier blues songs, and numerous artists later interpreted it.

== Background ==
Wolf had performed "Smokestack Lightning" in one form or another at least by the early 1930s, when he was performing with Charley Patton in small Delta communities. The song, described as "a hypnotic one-chord drone piece", draws on earlier blues, such as Tommy Johnson's "Big Road Blues", the Mississippi Sheiks' "Stop and Listen Blues", and Charley Patton's "Moon Going Down". Wolf said the song was inspired by watching trains in the night: "We used to sit out in the country and see the trains go by, watch the sparks come out of the smokestack. That was smokestack lightning." In 1951, he recorded the song as "Crying at Daybreak". It contains the line "O-oh smokestack lightnin', shinin', just like gold, oh don't you hear me cryin'", similar to the Mississippi Sheiks' lyric "A-ah, smokestack lightnin', that bell shine just like gold, now don't you hear me talkin'".

== Original song ==
At Chess' studio in Chicago in January 1956, Howlin' Wolf recorded "Smokestack Lightning". The song takes the form of "a propulsive, one-chord vamp, nominally in E major but with the flatted blue notes that make it sound like E minor", and lyrically it is "a pastiche of ancient blues lines and train references, timeless and evocative". Longtime Wolf guitarist Hubert Sumlin is credited with the distinctive guitar line. Howlin' Wolf sang and played harmonica, backed by pianist Hosea Lee Kennard, guitarists Willie Johnson and Hubert Sumlin, bassist Willie Dixon, and drummer Earl Phillips.

In 1956, "Smokestack Lightning" reached number 11 on the Billboard R&B chart. As the UK experienced an R&B boom in the early 1960s, British R&B groups regularly covered "Smokestack Lightning" in their live acts. Due to the song's renewed popularity, Pye International Records issued it in the UK on a moderately successful EP in late 1963 and then on a single the following year, where it peaked at number 42 in the singles chart. It was later included on the albums Moanin' in the Moonlight and The Howlin' Wolf Album.

== Recognition ==
In a song review for AllMusic, Bill Janovitz described "Smokestack Lightning" as "almost like a distillation of the essence of the blues ... a pleasingly primitive and raw representation of the blues, pure and chant-like. Wolf truly sounds like a man in otherwise inexpressible agony, flailing for words." In 1999, the song received a Grammy Hall of Fame Award, honoring its lasting historical significance. Rolling Stone magazine ranked it at number 291 in its list of the "500 Greatest Songs of All Time" and the Rock and Roll Hall of Fame included it in its list of the "500 Songs that Shaped Rock and Roll". In 1985, the song was inducted into the Blues Foundation Hall of Fame in the "Classics of Blues Recordings" category and, in 2009, it was selected for permanent preservation in the National Recording Registry of the U.S. Library of Congress.

Janovitz also identifies "Smokestack Lightning" as a blues standard "open to varied interpretation, covered by artists ranging from the Yardbirds to Soundgarden, all stamping their personal imprint on the song". Clapton identifies the Yardbirds' performances of the song as the group's most popular live number. They played it almost every show, and sometimes it could last up to 30 minutes. One version lasting 5:35 is included on the Yardbirds UK debut album, Five Live Yardbirds (1964) and the US split studio/live album Having a Rave Up with The Yardbirds (1965). Howlin' Wolf reportedly referred to the group's interpretation as "the definitive version of his song".
