= Paul Samwell-Smith =

English musician and record producer (born 1943)

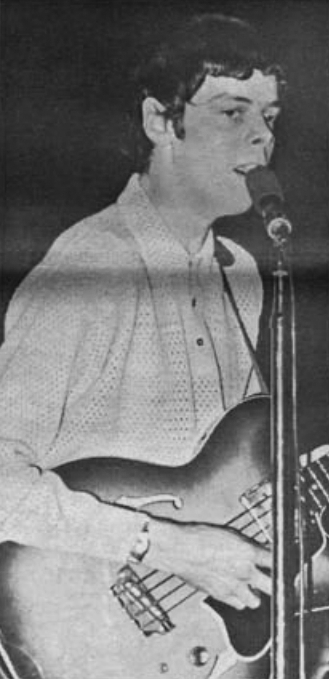
- Samwell-Smith with the Yardbirds in 1965

Background information
- Born: Paul G. Smith; 8 May 1943 (age 83); Brentford, West London, England
- Genres: Blues rock, psychedelic rock
- Occupations: Musician, record producer
- Instruments: Bass; vocals; guitar; keyboards; percussion
- Years active: 1960s–present
- Label: Island
- Formerly of: The Yardbirds; Renaissance; Box of Frogs

Paul Granville Samwell-Smith (born Paul Granville Smith, 8 May 1943) is an English musician and record producer. He was a founding member and the bassist of the 1960s English rock band the Yardbirds, which launched leading guitarists Eric Clapton, Jeff Beck and Jimmy Page to fame.

== Early life ==
Paul Granville Smith was born in Brentford, west London, England on 8 May 1943. Samwell was added to his surname when his parents decided they wanted to merge both of their surnames together, so that his mother would not be known as Mrs. Smith. As a youth, Samwell-Smith attended Hampton School with Yardbirds drummer Jim McCarty. Samwell-Smith took up the bass guitar after hearing Ricky Fenson (who was also an early member of the Rolling Stones) playing the instrument.

== The Yardbirds ==
In late May 1963, he formed the Yardbirds with Keith Relf, Anthony Topham, Chris Dreja, and Jim McCarty. During this period his primary instrument was a short-scale Epiphone Rivoli bass. He played on the UK albums Five Live Yardbirds and Yardbirds (also known as Roger the Engineer) and on the US albums For Your Love, Having a Rave Up, and Over Under Sideways Down (which was Roger the Engineer retitled for the US market), all released on Epic Records. He provided background vocals on many songs like "Good Morning Little School Girl", "For Your Love", "Heart Full of Soul", "Evil Hearted You", and more. He composed the Gregorian chant arrangements and lyrics of the songs "Still I'm Sad" and "Turn Into Earth". While in the Yardbirds he started working on the technical side in the studio. In June 1966, becoming tired of touring and wishing to focus on record production, he left the Yardbirds and was replaced by Jimmy Page. The last Yardbirds album he played on was Roger the Engineer.

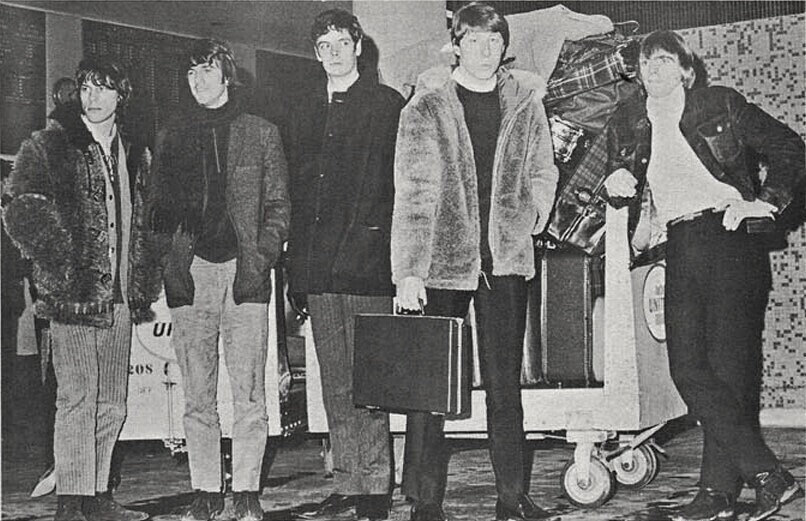
The Yardbirds arriving in the United States, early 1966. Samwell-Smith stands in the centre

Samwell-Smith was a major contributor to the original tracks written by the Yardbirds during his tenure with them. Whilst in the group he co-produced and engineered much of their music, working with record producers such as Mickie Most, Simon Napier-Bell and Giorgio Gomelsky.

In the early 1980s, Samwell-Smith played in the Yardbirds reunion band Box of Frogs with original Yardbirds members Chris Dreja and Jim McCarty. Box of Frogs did not tour because Chris Dreja was busy with his photography and Samwell-Smith was busy in the recording studio.

He was inducted to the Rock and Roll Hall of Fame as a member of the Yardbirds in 1992.

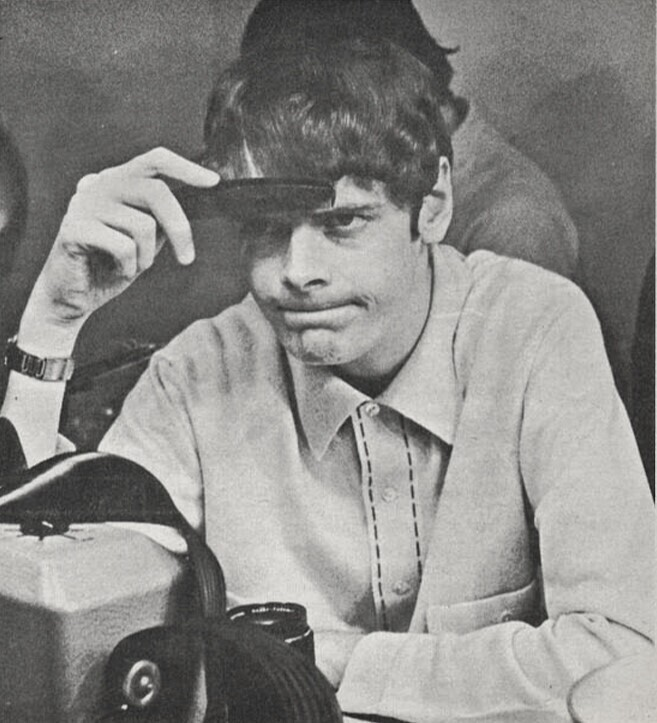
Samwell-Smith in early 1966

== Records and film ==
=== Producer ===
Samwell-Smith went on to become a successful producer, with credits including Cat Stevens's albums Mona Bone Jakon, Tea for the Tillerman (both 1970), Teaser and the Firecat (1971) and Catch Bull at Four (1972). An article in The Washington Post praised Samwell-Smith's "deft, understated touch" on these recordings as a primary reason for their commercial success, and commented: "The chamber ensemble palette Samwell-Smith employed, consisting mainly of acoustic guitars, piano, upright bass and hand percussion, and the refined arrangements he crafted, perfectly complement the interior landscapes that Stevens was exploring. Stevens had the pure, raw talent, certainly, but it was Samwell-Smith who seemed to understand how best to transmute and position that talent for maximum artistic impact." Samwell-Smith also produced recordings for Jethro Tull, Carly Simon, Renaissance, Murray Head, Chris de Burgh, Beverley Craven, Toto Coelo, The Roches, Illusion and Claire Hamill. Other production credits include two of Amazing Blondel's albums for Island Records; the first and second albums by All About Eve for Mercury; and "American Tune" (1973 single) with Paul Simon.

=== Film ===
Paul Samwell-Smith was the musical producer for the film Harold and Maude in 1971 (with music written by Cat Stevens), which became a cult classic. Two decades later, he produced the soundtrack of Postcards from the Edge in 1990, as a music sound recording and recording supervisor.

== Legacy ==
Regarding Samwell-Smith's years with the Yardbirds, a 2020 article in Guitar World opined: "As a bassist, Paul Samwell-Smith was solid and occasionally prominently inventive. No doubt, had he stuck to that he'd have been feted as an influence by many."
