= Crawdaddy Club =

Nightclub in Richmond, Surrey, England

Coordinates: 51°27′48″N 0°18′9″W

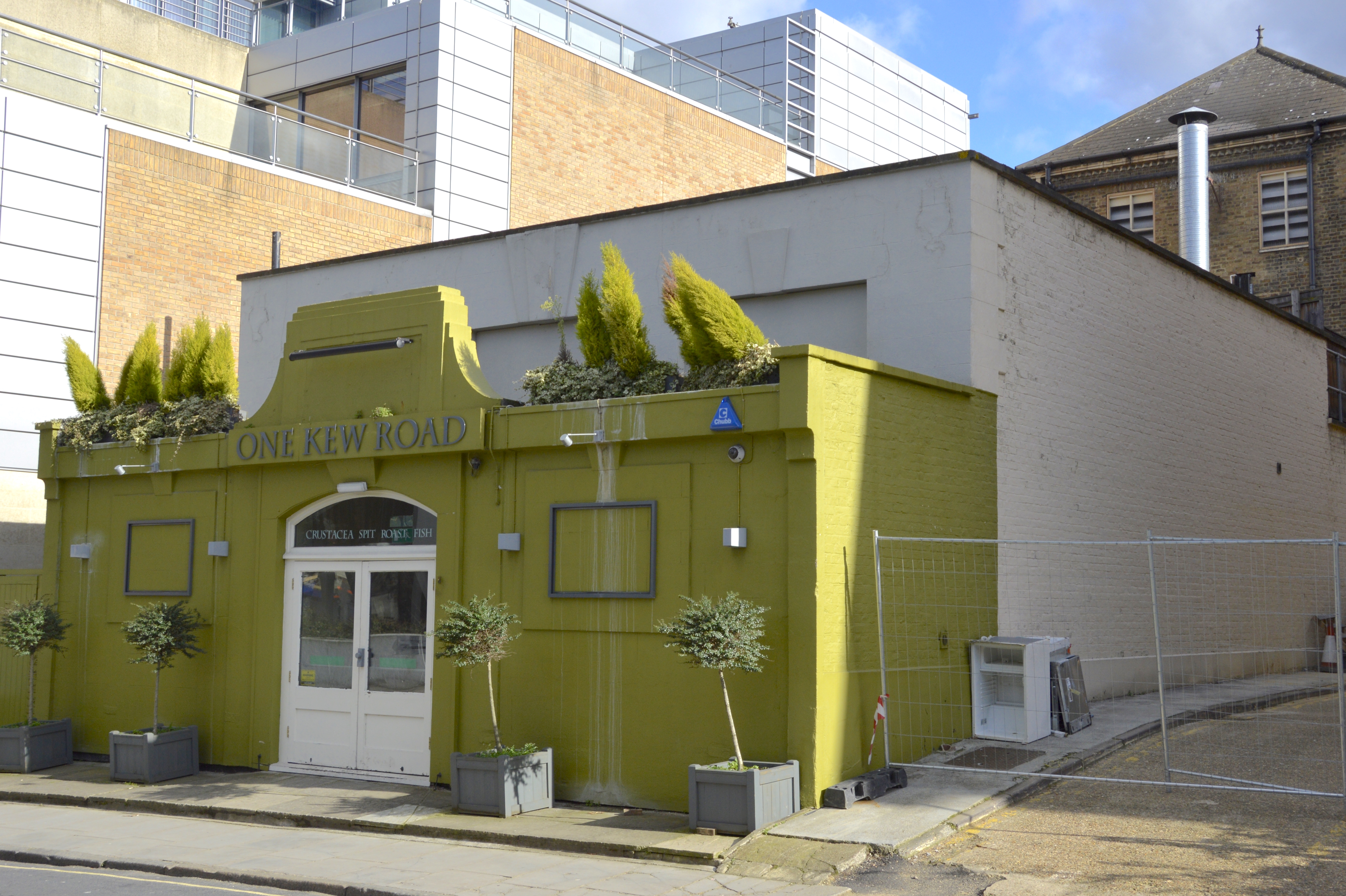
The back room of the Station Hotel in 2014, original home of the Crawdaddy Club

The Crawdaddy Club was a music venue in Richmond, Surrey, England, which opened in 1963. The Rolling Stones were its house band in its first year and were followed by The Yardbirds. Several other notable British blues and rhythm and blues acts also played there.

== History ==
Giorgio Gomelsky was a Georgian émigré who worked as an assistant film editor by day and a music promoter by night. He began in the jazz scene before starting the Piccadilly Club, a blues club in central London. When that closed in early 1963 he needed a new venue and, since he knew the landlord of the Station Hotel in suburban Richmond, he took over the back room, which had been little used since its jazz sessions had petered out. The name of the club derived from Bo Diddley's 1960 song "Doing the Craw-Daddy", which The Rolling Stones regularly performed as part of their set. In turn the club would inspire the name of the American music magazine Crawdaddy!

Gomelsky's first house band was the Dave Hunt Rhythm & Blues Band whom he knew from the Piccadilly. Sometimes they used a young drummer called Charlie Watts, and for about six weeks in January–February 1963 their guitarist was Ray Davies, who later formed The Kinks.

The Rolling Stones played their first gig at the Crawdaddy in February 1963, because the Dave Hunt band were snowed in during the coldest winter since 1740. Although the Stones had played their first gig the previous summer, Bill Wyman did not become a member until 7 December 1962, and Charlie Watts joined in January 1963, so the Crawdaddy saw the first public performance with them in the band. This first gig was not a commercial success; Gomelsky had to plead with customers of the main hotel to attend, offering two entries for the price of one ticket.

Within three weeks word had spread and the Stones took over the residency; by April they had two gigs a week at the Crawdaddy and a weekly slot at Eel Pie Island, 2 miles (3.2 km) away in Twickenham. The Beatles came to see them on 14 April 1963, and afterwards went back to Mick Jagger's flat in Chelsea. Audiences overflowed onto the street, and the Crawdaddy was forced to move up the road to a larger venue, the Richmond Athletic Ground. During that time, the Stones had their first chart hit, a cover of Chuck Berry's "Come On".

When the Stones became too big for small local clubs and went on tour, their residency at the Crawdaddy was taken over by another leading R&B group from nearby Kingston upon Thames, The Yardbirds, featuring Eric Clapton. Other artists who played at the club included Led Zeppelin, Long John Baldry, Elton John and Rod Stewart.

The Crawdaddy Club also ran events at the same time at The Star public house in Broad Green, Croydon. The main band was The Yardbirds, but other bands from the Richmond Crawdaddy would visit and play. It hosted a lot of American R&B artists who would jam with them, including Sonny Boy Williamson. The Animals would also visit to enjoy a pint at the bar after gigs at The Orchid, Purley. Julie Driscoll started her singing career there after being dared to get up and sing.

In March 2011, the Crawdaddy Club was revived at the Athletic Ground by Mike Rivers and his wife Sylvie. Gigs have been held on a monthly basis, and feature top R&B bands, including The Others, who were the third house band at the original club after The Rolling Stones and The Yardbirds. They have continued to run events at the Athletic Ground and elsewhere to the present day, hosting many bands who have gone on to great success including at the UK Blues Awards, alongside original performers from the early days of the Club. Since the passing of Mike Rivers the club has been continued by his dedicated team who now run it as a charitable, not for profit entity, dedicated to preserving the legacy of live music in the borough of Richmond, as well as promoting youthful and emerging acts. The Club sponsored the lifetime achievement awards at the 2024 UK Blues Awards, and is sponsoring the Emerging Act category in 2025.
