= I Wish You Would (Billy Boy Arnold song) =

Single by Billy Boy a.k.a. Billy Boy Arnold
- B-side: "I Was Fooled"
- Released: June 1955
- Recorded: May 5, 1955
- Studio: Universal Recording, Chicago
- Genre: Blues
- Length: 2:55
- Label: Vee-Jay
- Songwriter(s): Billy Boy Arnold

Billy Boy Arnold singles chronology
"I Ain't Got No Mone" (1953)	"I Wish You Would" (1955)	"I Ain't Got You" (1956)

"I Wish You Would" is a song recorded by Chicago blues musician Billy Boy Arnold in 1955. It was developed while Arnold was performing with Bo Diddley and incorporates a Diddley-style rhythm. Called "a timeless Chicago blues classic", "I Wish You Would" is Arnold's best-known song and has been recorded by several artists, including the Yardbirds, who recorded it for their debut single in 1964.

== Original song ==
"I Wish You Would" was developed from "Diddy Diddy Dum Dum", a song Billy Boy Arnold wrote and sang with Bo Diddley. Leonard Chess, the owner/producer of Diddley's record label, Checker Records, planned to record the song as Diddley's second single. However, Arnold heard that Chess did not like him, so he took the song to Chess' rival, Vee-Jay Records. Vee-Jay suggested that he change the lyrics, so Arnold came up with "I Wish You Would".

Early in the morning about the break of day
That's when my baby went away
Crying and pleading won't do you no good
Come back baby I wish you would

The song features a one-chord modal blues structure with a repeating guitar figure and Diddley-style rhythm. Backing Arnold (vocal and harmonica) are Jody Williams (guitar), Milton Rector (bass), and Earl Phillips (drums). The single, credited to "Billy Boy", reportedly sold well, but did not appear in the national record charts. Arnold revisited "I Wish You Would" several times during his career, producing new studio versions and live versions of the song for a variety of record labels.

Arnold later commented that because of "I Wish You Would" he was unfairly labeled as a Bo Diddley stylist:

I was a straight blues guy ... Bo Diddley's stuff was rock'n'rollish, it wasn't straight blues, and when I did 'I Wish You Would,' and it had that similar type of beat, that just throws me in the same pot with Bo Diddley, 'cause everybody identified the song as a Bo Diddley type of song. But I had no intention of ever doing anything like Bo Diddley, 'cause that wasn't my style of music.

== The Yardbirds versions ==
"I Wish You Would"

Single by the Yardbirds
- B-side: "A Certain Girl"
- Released: May 1, 1964 (UK); August 17, 1964 (US)
- Recorded: March 1964
- Studio: Olympic, London
- Genre: Blues rock
- Length: 2:19
- Label: Columbia (UK); Epic (US)
- Songwriter(s): Billy Boy Arnold
- Producer(s): Giorgio Gomelsky

The Yardbirds UK singles chronology
"I Wish You Would" (1964)	"Good Morning Little Schoolgirl" (1964)

The Yardbirds US singles chronology
"I Wish You Would" (1964)	"For Your Love" (1965)

English rock band the Yardbirds recorded "I Wish You Would" for their debut single in 1964. Recorded at Olympic Studios in London in March 1964, it lacks the Bo Diddley-style beat and is considerably shorter than live versions performed by the Yardbirds around this time.

Columbia UK issued the song, with "A Certain Girl" as the B-side, for the group's debut single on May 1, 1964, with Epic US following on August 17, 1964. The single did not enter the main record charts in the UK or US, but was later released on the Yardbirds' first American album, For Your Love, which reached number 96 on Billboard's Top LPs chart in 1965.

Group bassist and music director Paul Samwell-Smith later commented, "'I Wish You Would' [was] made with the idea of getting our stage sound. It was a mistake, because trying to get a stage sound captured in a studio is very difficult." Several live versions were recorded by the Yardbirds, which were later released. A version from 1963 with Eric Clapton was released on London 1963 – The First Recordings! (1981); a 1965 recording by the BBC with Jeff Beck was released on Yardbirds ... On Air (1991); and a 1968 version with Jimmy Page appears on Last Rave-Up in LA.

== Bibliography ==
- Dahl, Bill (1996). Erlewine, Michael; Bogdanov, Vladimir; Woodstra, Chris; Koda, Cub (eds.). Billy Boy Arnold. San Francisco: Miller Freeman Books. ISBN 0-87930-424-3.
- Jones, Nick (July 17, 1965). "Yardbirds—Why We Went 'Commercial'". Melody Maker. London. ISSN 0025-9012.
- Koda, Cub (2001). Ultimate! (Box set booklet). The Yardbirds. Los Angeles: Rhino Records. OCLC 781357622. R2 79825.
- Morris, Chris (April 14, 2001). "Declaration of Independents". Billboard. Vol. 113, no. 15. ISSN 0006-2510.
- Russo, Greg (2016). Yardbirds: The Ultimate Rave-Up. Floral Park, New York: Crossfire Publications. ISBN 978-0-9791845-7-4.
