= List of the Yardbirds members =

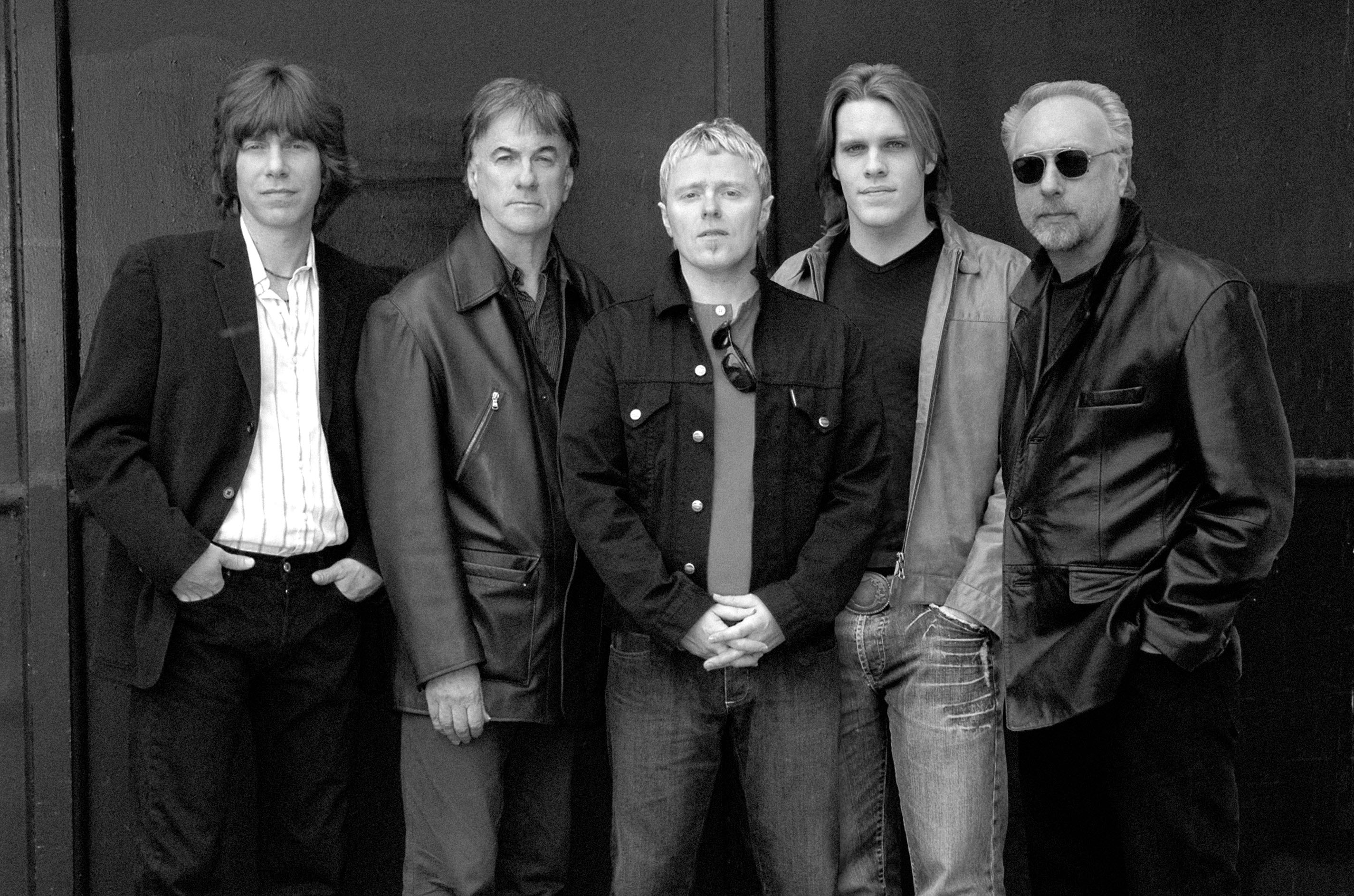
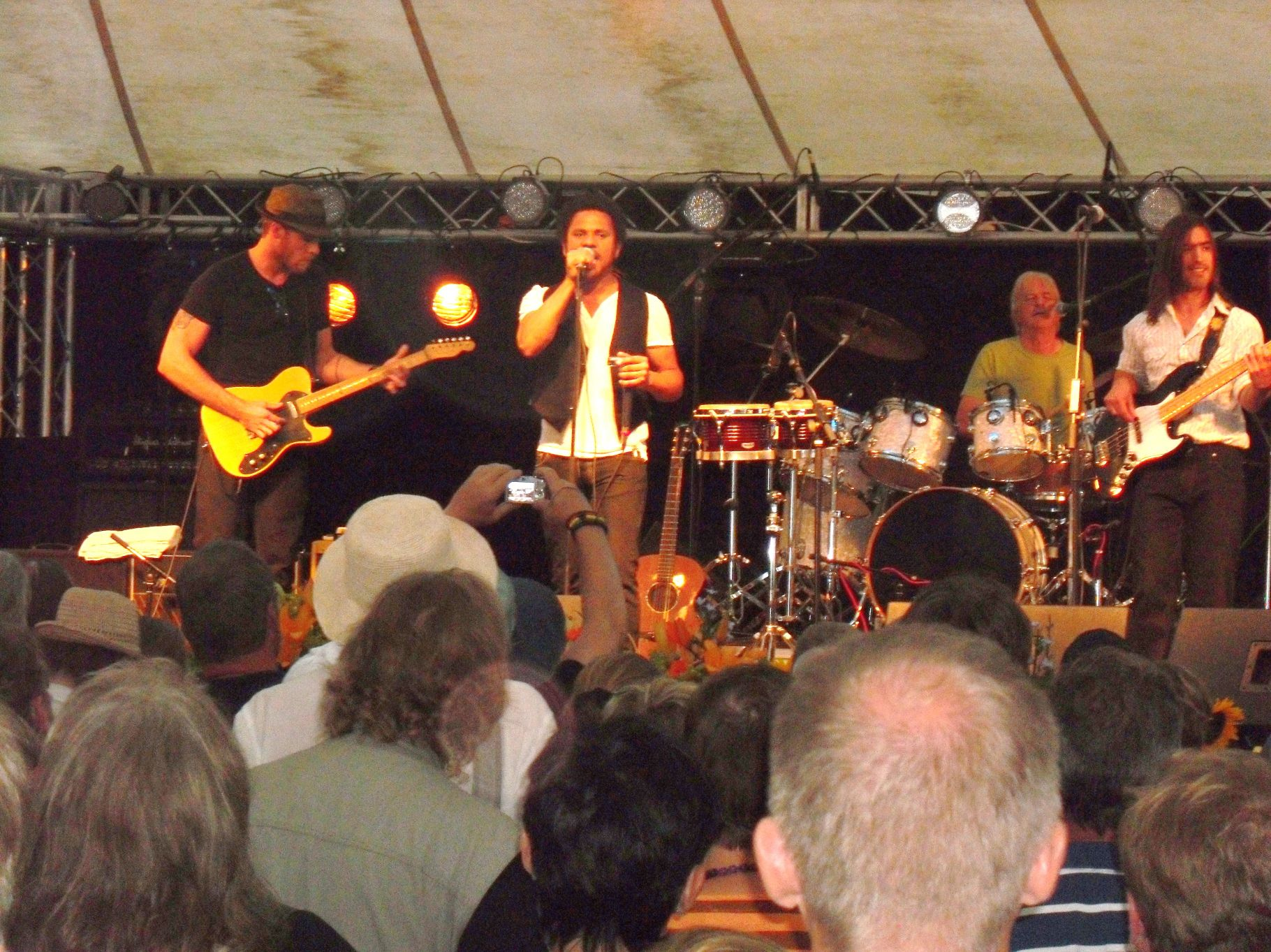
The Yardbirds in 2005 (top) and 2010 (bottom)

The Yardbirds are an English blues rock band from London. Formed in May 1963, the group originally included lead vocalist Keith Relf, lead guitarist Anthony "Top" Topham, rhythm guitarist Chris Dreja, bassist Paul Samwell-Smith, and drummer Jim McCarty. In October, Topham was replaced by Eric Clapton. He remained until 13 March 1965, when he left due to creative disagreements. Clapton recommended Jimmy Page to replace him, but he declined and Jeff Beck took over. Page later joined on bass the following June, after Samwell-Smith abruptly quit; Dreja later took over the role, allowing Page to join Beck on guitar. This lineup was short-lived, however, as Beck left in November 1966. The group continued as a four-piece until July 1968, when Relf and McCarty left due to creative differences, primarily with Page. Dreja initially remained, but by August, Page formed a new group under the name The New Yardbirds, with vocalist Robert Plant, bassist John Paul Jones and drummer John Bonham, who later renamed themselves Led Zeppelin.

McCarty and Dreja reformed the Yardbirds in 1992, adding new members "Detroit" John Idan (lead vocals, lead guitar) and Rod Demick (bass, harmonica, backing vocals) from the drummer's eponymous band. Months later Demick left the band, Ray Majors joined on lead guitar, and Idan moved to bass, Laurie Garman also joined on harmonica. A recording of the Jim McCarty Band featuring Demick and Idan was released under the Yardbirds name as Reunion Jam. In 1996, Majors was replaced by Gypie Mayo, and later Garman was replaced by Alan Glen. This lineup remained stable for seven years, releasing the band's first new studio album since 1967, Birdland, in 2003. Shortly after the album's touring cycle, Glen left the Yardbirds and was replaced by Billy Boy Miskimmin. Mayo also left the band at the end of 2004, with Jerry Donahue taking his place. Donahue remained for a year, before he was replaced by Ben King.

In 2008, Glen returned to replace Miskimmin, although only remained for a year before leaving again. Also in 2009, Idan left the Yardbirds after 14 years as the band's frontman. To replace Glen and Idan, the group added Andy Mitchell on lead vocals, acoustic guitar and harmonica, with David Smale joining on bass. The band's lineup remained stable until early 2012, when Dreja was forced to stop performing after suffering two strokes. The following July, it was announced that Dreja would be leaving the band, with original member Top Topham taking his place. On 30 January 2015, this lineup played its final show at the 100 Club in London. A few days later, it was announced that McCarty and Topham would return with former lead singer and guitarist Idan, bassist Kenny Aaronson and Myke Scavone on harmonica and percussion.

Within a month of announcing a new lineup in February 2015, the Yardbirds postponed all tour dates due to "health concerns and extenuating circumstances". In May, guitarist Earl Slick was added to the band's lineup in place of Topham, and the shows were rescheduled for later in the year. However, due to "scheduling conflicts" Slick was unable to tour with the group, and on 12 August 2015 Johnny A. was announced as the band's new lead guitarist. Johnny A. remained until July 2018, when he was replaced by Godfrey Townsend.

== Members ==
=== Current members ===
Image	Name	Years active	Instruments	Release contributions
	Jim McCarty	1963–1968; 1992–present	drums; percussion; backing and occasional lead vocals	all Yardbirds releases
	John Idan	1992–2009; 2015–present	lead vocals; rhythm guitar (2015–present); bass (1995–2009); lead guitar (1992–1995)	Reunion Jam (1999); Birdland (2003); Reunion Jam Vol. II (2006); Live at B.B. King Blues Club
	Kenny Aaronson	2015–present	bass	none to date
	Myke Scavone	2015–present	harmonica; percussion; backing vocals	none to date
	Godfrey Townsend	2018–present	lead guitar; backing vocals	none to date

=== Former members ===
Image	Name	Years active	Instruments	Release contributions
	Chris Dreja	1963–1968; 1992–2013; (died 2025)	rhythm guitar (1963–1966, 1992–2013); bass (1966–1968); backing vocals; occasional piano and lead guitar	all Yardbirds releases
	Keith Relf	1963–1968 (died 1976)	lead vocals; harmonica; percussion; rhythm guitar (1965–1968)	all Yardbirds releases from Five Live Yardbirds (1964) to London 1963: The First Recordings! (1981); BBC Sessions (1997); Live! Blueswailing July '64 (2003); Yardbirds '68 (2017)
	Paul Samwell-Smith	1963–1966	bass; backing and occasional lead vocals	all Yardbirds releases from Five Live Yardbirds (1964) to Roger the Engineer (1966); London 1963: The First Recordings! (1981); BBC Sessions (1997); Live! Blueswailing July '64 (2003)
	Anthony "Top" Topham	1963; 2013–2015; (died 2023)	lead guitar; rhythm guitar and backing vocals (2013–2015)	none
	Eric Clapton	1963–1965	lead guitar; occasional lead vocals	Five Live Yardbirds (1964); For Your Love (1965); Having a Rave Up (1965); Sonny Boy Williamson and the Yardbirds (1966); London 1963: The First Recordings! (1981); Live! Blueswailing July '64 (2003)
	Jeff Beck	1965–1966 (died 2023)	lead guitar; occasional lead vocals	For Your Love (1965); Having a Rave Up (1965); Roger the Engineer (1966); BBC Sessions (1997); Birdland (2003) – guest appearance on one track only
	Jimmy Page	1966–1968	lead guitar; rhythm guitar (1966); bass (1966)	Little Games (1967); Live Yardbirds: Featuring Jimmy Page (1971); BBC Sessions (1997); Yardbirds '68 (2017)
	Rod Demick	1992–1995	bass; harmonica; backing vocals	none
	Laurie Garman	1995–1996	harmonica	none
	Ray Majors	1995–1996 (died 2022)	lead guitar; backing vocals	none
	Gypie Mayo (John Cawthra)	1996–2004 (died 2013)	lead guitar; backing vocals	Birdland (2003)
	Alan Glen	1996–2003; 2008–2009	harmonica; percussion	Birdland (2003)
	Billy Boy Miskimmin	2003–2008	harmonica; percussion	Live at B.B. King Blues Club (2007)
	Jerry Donahue	2004–2005	lead guitar	none
	Ben King	2005–2015	lead guitar	Live at B.B. King Blues Club (2007); Making Tracks (2012)
	Andy Mitchell	2009–2015	lead vocals; acoustic guitar; harmonica; percussion	Making Tracks (2012)
	David Smale	2009–2015	bass; backing vocals	Making Tracks (2012)
	Earl Slick (Frank Madeloni)	2015	lead guitar	none
	Johnny A. (John Antonopoulos)	2015–2018	lead guitar	none

== Line-ups ==
Period	Members	Releases
May–October 1963	Keith Relf – lead vocals, harmonica; Top Topham – lead guitar; Chris Dreja – rhythm guitar; Paul Samwell-Smith – bass, backing vocals; Jim McCarty – drums, percussion, backing vocals	none
October 1963 – March 1965	Keith Relf – lead vocals, harmonica; Chris Dreja – rhythm guitar; Paul Samwell-Smith – bass, backing vocals; Jim McCarty – drums, percussion, backing vocals; Eric Clapton – lead guitar, occasional lead vocals	Five Live Yardbirds (1964); For Your Love (1965); Having a Rave Up (1965); Sonny Boy Williamson and the Yardbirds (1966); London 1963: The First Recordings (1981); Live! Blueswailing July '64 (2003); Glimpses 1963–1968 (2011)
March 1965 – June 1966	Keith Relf – lead vocals, harmonica; Chris Dreja – rhythm guitar, piano; Paul Samwell-Smith – bass, backing vocals; Jim McCarty – drums, percussion, backing vocals; Jeff Beck – lead guitar, occasional lead vocals	For Your Love (1965); Having a Rave Up (1965); Roger the Engineer (1966); Glimpses 1963–1968 (2011)
June–August 1966	Keith Relf – lead vocals, harmonica; Chris Dreja – rhythm guitar; Jim McCarty – drums, percussion, backing vocals; Jeff Beck – lead guitar; Jimmy Page – bass	"Psycho Daisies" (1966) (Beck, Page, & McCarty only); Glimpses 1963–1968 (2011) (3 live tracks from 27/6/1966)
August–November 1966	Keith Relf – lead vocals, harmonica; Chris Dreja – bass, backing vocals; Jim McCarty – drums, percussion, backing vocals; Jeff Beck – lead and rhythm guitars; Jimmy Page – lead and rhythm guitars	"Happenings Ten Years Time Ago" (1966) (with John Paul Jones on bass); "Stroll On" (1967)
November 1966 – July 1968	Keith Relf – lead vocals, harmonica, rhythm guitar; Chris Dreja – bass, backing vocals; Jim McCarty – drums, percussion, backing vocals; Jimmy Page – lead guitar	Little Games (1967); Live Yardbirds: Featuring Jimmy Page (1971); Glimpses 1963–1968 (2011); Yardbirds '68 (2017)
Band inactive 1969–1992
1984 – 1986 (Partial comeback as Box of Frogs)	Chris Dreja – rhythm guitar, percussion, backing vocals; Jim McCarty – drums, backing vocals, percussion, keyboards; Paul Samwell-Smith – bass, backing vocals percussion, synthesizer; John Fiddler – lead vocals, guitars, percussion, synthesizers; Notable session contributors: Jimmy Page – lead guitar; Jeff Beck – lead guitar; Ray Majors – lead guitar, backing vocals, percussion; Rory Gallagher – lead and slide guitar, electric sitar; Mark Feltham – harmonica; Steve Hackett – lead guitar; Graham Gouldman – rhythm guitar, backing vocals	Box of Frogs (1984); Interchords (1984); Strange Land (1986)
1992–1995	Chris Dreja – rhythm guitar, backing vocals; Jim McCarty – drums, percussion, backing vocals; Rod Demick – bass, harmonica, backing vocals; John Idan – lead vocals, lead guitar	none
1995–1996	Chris Dreja – rhythm guitar, backing vocals; Jim McCarty – drums, percussion, backing vocals; John Idan – lead vocals, bass; Ray Majors – lead guitar, backing vocals; Laurie Garman – harmonica	none
1996	Chris Dreja – rhythm guitar, backing vocals; Jim McCarty – drums, percussion, backing vocals; John Idan – lead vocals, bass; Laurie Garman – harmonica; Gypie Mayo – lead guitar, backing vocals	none
1996–2003	Chris Dreja – rhythm guitar, backing vocals; Jim McCarty – drums, backing vocals; John Idan – lead vocals, bass; Gypie Mayo – lead guitar, backing vocals; Alan Glen – harmonica, percussion	Birdland (2003)
2003 – November 2004	Chris Dreja – rhythm guitar, backing vocals; Jim McCarty – drums, backing vocals; John Idan – lead vocals, bass; Gypie Mayo – lead guitar, backing vocals; Billy Boy Miskimmin – harmonica, percussion, backing vocals	none
November 2004 – October 2005	Chris Dreja – rhythm guitar, backing vocals; Jim McCarty – drums, backing vocals; John Idan – lead vocals, bass; Billy Boy Miskimmin – harmonica, percussion, backing vocals; Jerry Donahue – lead guitar	none
October 2005 – 2008	Chris Dreja – rhythm guitar, backing vocals; Jim McCarty – drums, backing vocals; John Idan – lead vocals, bass; Billy Boy Miskimmin – harmonica, percussion, backing vocals; Ben King – lead guitar, percussion	Live at B.B. King Blues Club (2007)
2008 – May 2009	Chris Dreja – rhythm guitar, backing vocals; Jim McCarty – drums, backing vocals; John Idan – lead vocals, bass; Ben King – lead guitar, percussion; Alan Glen – harmonica, percussion	none
May 2009 – July 2013	Chris Dreja – rhythm guitar, backing vocals; Jim McCarty – drums, backing vocals; Ben King – lead guitar, percussion; Andy Mitchell – lead vocals, acoustic guitar, harmonica, percussion; David Smale – bass, backing vocals	Making Tracks (2012)
July 2013 – January 2015	Jim McCarty – drums, backing vocals; Ben King – lead guitar, percussion; Andy Mitchell – lead vocals, acoustic guitar, harmonica, percussion; David Smale – bass, backing vocals; Top Topham – rhythm guitar, backing vocals	none
February–May 2015	Jim McCarty – drums, backing vocals; Top Topham – lead guitar, backing vocals; John Idan – lead vocals, rhythm guitar; Kenny Aaronson – bass; Myke Scavone – harmonica, percussion, backing vocals	none
May–August 2015	Jim McCarty – drums, backing vocals; John Idan – lead vocals, rhythm guitar; Kenny Aaronson – bass; Myke Scavone – harmonica, percussion, backing vocals; Earl Slick – lead guitar	none
August 2015 – July 2018	Jim McCarty – drums, backing vocals; John Idan – lead vocals, rhythm guitar; Kenny Aaronson – bass; Myke Scavone – harmonica, percussion, backing vocals; Johnny A. – lead guitar	none
July 2018 – present	Jim McCarty – drums, vocals; John Idan – lead vocals, rhythm guitar; Kenny Aaronson – bass; Myke Scavone – harmonica, percussion, backing vocals; Godfrey Townsend – lead guitar, backing vocals	none
