= Ben King (guitarist) =

British guitarist (born 1984)

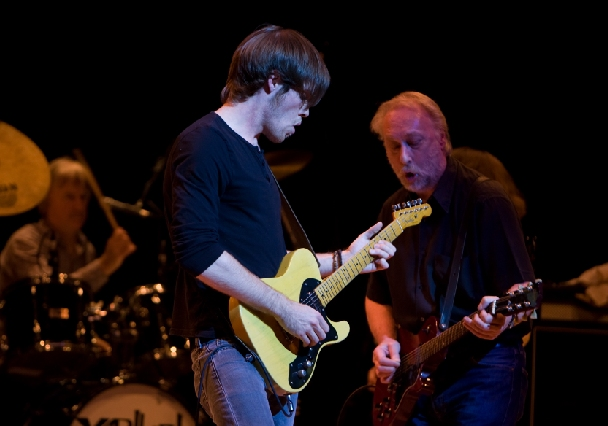
- King playing alongside Chris Dreja in Basingstoke, England in September 2008

Background information
- Born: 22 July 1984 (age 41); Guildford, Surrey, England
- Origin: London, England
- Occupation: Guitarist
- Formerly of: The Yardbirds (2005-2015)

Ben King (born 22 July 1984) is a British guitarist, who joined English band The Yardbirds in October 2005. He has gained popularity as a musician owing to his extensive technical ability of the guitar coupled with his young age upon entry to the Yardbirds at only 21 years old.

== Career ==
Born to a musical family (his father having also been a professional guitarist) in 1984, King spent the majority of his life devoted to the guitar, growing up listening to the vast range of music provided by his parents. King developed an astute understanding of the guitar at a very early stage, garnering both a technical and philosophical approach alongside a head-down work ethic.

Having spent time in various bands and gaining local notoriety for his talent, he moved to Guildford, Surrey where he enrolled at the Academy of Contemporary Music. King received a good amount of attention from the faculty with his talents, and gained the interest of ex-Alice Cooper guitarist Pete Friesen and Yardbirds bass guitarist John Idan.

Having completed his vocational studies, King was offered an audition by Idan, founding Yardbirds members Jim McCarty and Chris Dreja. Speaking of Idan's interest in King, McCarty commented:

Idan met Ben and [he] happened to be best guitar[ist] there. John recommended him. He was great. We were looking for someone who could create some of the sounds we were used to.

— Jim McCarty, 2006

King was offered a role within The Yardbirds and replaced Jerry Donahue as lead guitarist in October 2005. The band booked a run of shows across England in that year before beginning to tour internationally in countries such as Germany, France, Sweden, Canada, Japan and the United States.

King features on The Yardbirds' 2007 live release Live at B.B. King Blues Club (Favored Nations). A clip of the song "I'm A Man", from this album was used by 20th Century Fox on the first episode of season 19 of The Simpsons. He also performs on, co-produced, mixed, and art directed the band's 2014 live album and DVD Making Tracks.

King was dropped from the Yardbirds lineup in 2015, and was replaced by original lead guitarist Top Topham, who had been playing in place of Dreja since 2013.
