= Live! Blueswailing July '64 =

Live album by the Yardbirds
- Released: 23 September 2003
- Recorded: 7 August [sic] 1964
- Venue: Marquee Club, London
- Genre: Blues rock
- Length: 31:19
- Label: Castle Music

The Yardbirds chronology
Birdland (2003)	Live! Blueswailing July '64 (2003)	Reunion Jam Vol. II (2006)

Live! Blueswailing July '64 is a live album by English rock group the Yardbirds. The recordings were discovered in 2003 and when the album was released that year, the date and location of the performance was uncertain. However, it since has been determined that it was recorded at the Marquee Club in London on 7 August 1964. (Note: A 31 July 1964 recording date, when the group also performed at the Marquee, has also been suggested.) As with the group's British debut album (recorded at the Marquee in March) it contains some of the earliest live recordings with guitarist Eric Clapton.

== Recording ==
After the song "Got Love If You Want It", it is announced that Eric Clapton's guitar needs to be tuned, and in the meantime, Keith Relf tells the story of how at an earlier gig, Chris Dreja's Gibson guitar was broken in two by a falling speaker cabinet. He also claims that Clapton's guitar is the only black Fender Jazzmaster in the world. Dreja adds:

He's [Clapton is] playing to the words [and Relf's vocal on "The Sky Is Crying"] ... In a way, it's that pivotal moment when he started to master the style that's lived with him his whole life. He suddenly started to feel confident to play the style I think is what Eric's all about. He was playing as a true accompanist on the guitar.

== Critical reception ==
Professional ratings
Review scores
Source	Rating
AllMusic	3/5 stars

AllMusic reviewer Thom Jurek gave the album three out of five stars. He believes that the Yardbirds' performance and the sound quality of the recording is superior to the group's first live album, Five Live Yardbirds (1964). He notes:

[I]n the clos[ing track] – one of the most startling rock versions of "The Sky Is Crying" on record – the listener gets the clearest picture yet of Clapton as an early and worthy guitar hero.

== Track listing ==
Songwriters and track running times are taken from the original Castle/Sanctuary CD. Other releases may have different listings.

No.	Title	Writer(s)	Length
1.	"Someone to Love Me"	Snooky Pryor	2:17
2.	"Too Much Monkey Business"	Chuck Berry	3:07
3.	"I Got Love If You Want It"	James Moore a.k.a. Slim Harpo	4:15
4.	"Smokestack Lightnin'"	Howlin' Wolf	5:52
5.	"Good Morning Little Schoolgirl"	Sonny Boy Williamson I	3:36
6.	"She Is So Respectable/Humpty Dumpty"	O'Kelly Isley, Ronald Isley, Rudolph Isley	5:31
7.	"The Sky Is Crying"	Elmore James	6:41

== Personnel ==
The Yardbirds

- Keith Relf – harmonica, vocals
- Jim McCarty – drums
- Eric Clapton – guitar
- Chris Dreja – rhythm guitar
- Paul Samwell-Smith – bass

Technical

- Roger Dopson – coordination
- Neil Slaven – liner notes, annotation
- Norman Jopling – quotes researched and compiled
- Nick Watson – audio restoration, digital mastering
- Sam Szczepanski – product manager
- Paul Bevoir – artwork, design
- Hamish Grimes – photography

== Bibliography ==
- Live! Blueswailing July '64 (Album notes). The Yardbirds. Sundazed Music. 2004. LP labels. LP 5181.
- Russo, Greg (2016). Yardbirds: The Ultimate Rave-Up. Floral Park, New York: Crossfire Publications. ISBN 978-0-9791845-7-4.
- Slaven, Neil (2003). Live! Blueswailing July '64 (Album notes). The Yardbirds. Castle Music/Sanctuary Records. OCLC 178825608. 06076-81331-2.
