= Bad Reputation (Dirty White Boy album) =

Studio album by Dirty White Boy
- Released: 1990
- Studio: Granny's House, The Enterprise, Amigo Studios
- Genre: Glam metal, hard rock
- Label: Polydor
- Producer: Beau Hill

Professional ratings
Review scores
Source	Rating
Select	3/5 stars

Bad Reputation is a 1990 album by the rock band Dirty White Boy. It was the only album released by the band and spawned two singles "Let's Spend Momma's Money", which peaked at 93 on the UK Singles Chart and "Lazy Crazy". The album was produced by Beau Hill and released on the Polydor label. It is known that the band were unhappy with the sound of the final product and this could be another reason they decided to split.

== Track listing ==
All tracks written by David Glen Eisley and Earl Slick; except where noted:

1. "Bad Reputation" 3:58 (D. Eisley, K. Richards, E. Slick)
2. "Lazy Crazy" 4:40
3. "Let's Spend Momma's Money" 4:27 (D. Eisley, K. Richards, E. Slick)
4. "You Give Me Love" 5:30 (D. Eisley, K. Richards, E. Slick)
5. "Dead Cat Alley" 6:36
6. "Hammer On the Heart" 4:53
7. "Hard Times" 5:27
8. "Soul of a Loaded Gun" 5:39
9. "One Good Reason" 4:32
10. "Badlands" 5:26

== Personnel ==
- David Glen Eisley - lead vocals, keyboards and harmonica
- Earl Slick - lead guitar and backing vocals
- F. Kirk Alley - bass guitar and backing vocals
- Keni Richards - drums, percussion and backing vocals
- Billy Trudel - backing vocals
