= Dirty White Boy (band) =

American rock band

- Origin: Los Angeles, California, U.S.
- Genres: Glam metal, hard rock
- Years active: 1988–1991
- Labels: Polydor
- Past members: David Glen Eisley; Earl Slick; Keni Richards; F. Kirk Alley; Pete Comita

Dirty White Boy was an American hard rock/glam metal band formed in Los Angeles in 1988. The band released an album called Bad Reputation in 1990, and toured the U.S. and Europe to support it before breaking up due to poor album sales.

The band was constituted of a trio of musicians, who had already gained some recognition in the music industry. They decided to make this band in order to stay up to date with the latest music trends. Frontman David Glen Eisley had just been ousted from the band Giuffria (at the advice of non-member Gene Simmons, who basically dissolved the band) and was looking to get involved in a new project; Keni Richards had previously been the drummer for the band Autograph, who had a major hit in the mid-1980s with "Turn Up the Radio" and had recently broken up; Earl Slick had already developed a prolific career as a session guitarist, and occasional solo artist, throughout the 1970s and 1980s, playing with the likes of David Bowie and John Lennon. Bassist, and later tattoo artist, F. Kirk Alley replaced the original bassist Pete Comita (ex-Cheap Trick), and was the only member of the band who had not had any prior mainstream experience.

== Members ==
- David Glen Eisley – lead vocals, keyboards, and harmonica (1988–1991)
- Earl Slick – guitar and backing vocals (1988–1991)
- F. Kirk Alley – bass guitar and backing vocals (1988–1991)
- Keni Richards – drums, percussion, and backing vocals (1988–1991: died 2017)
- Pete Comita – bass guitar and backing vocals (1988)

== Discography ==
- Bad Reputation (1990)
