= Earl Slick =

American guitarist (born 1952)

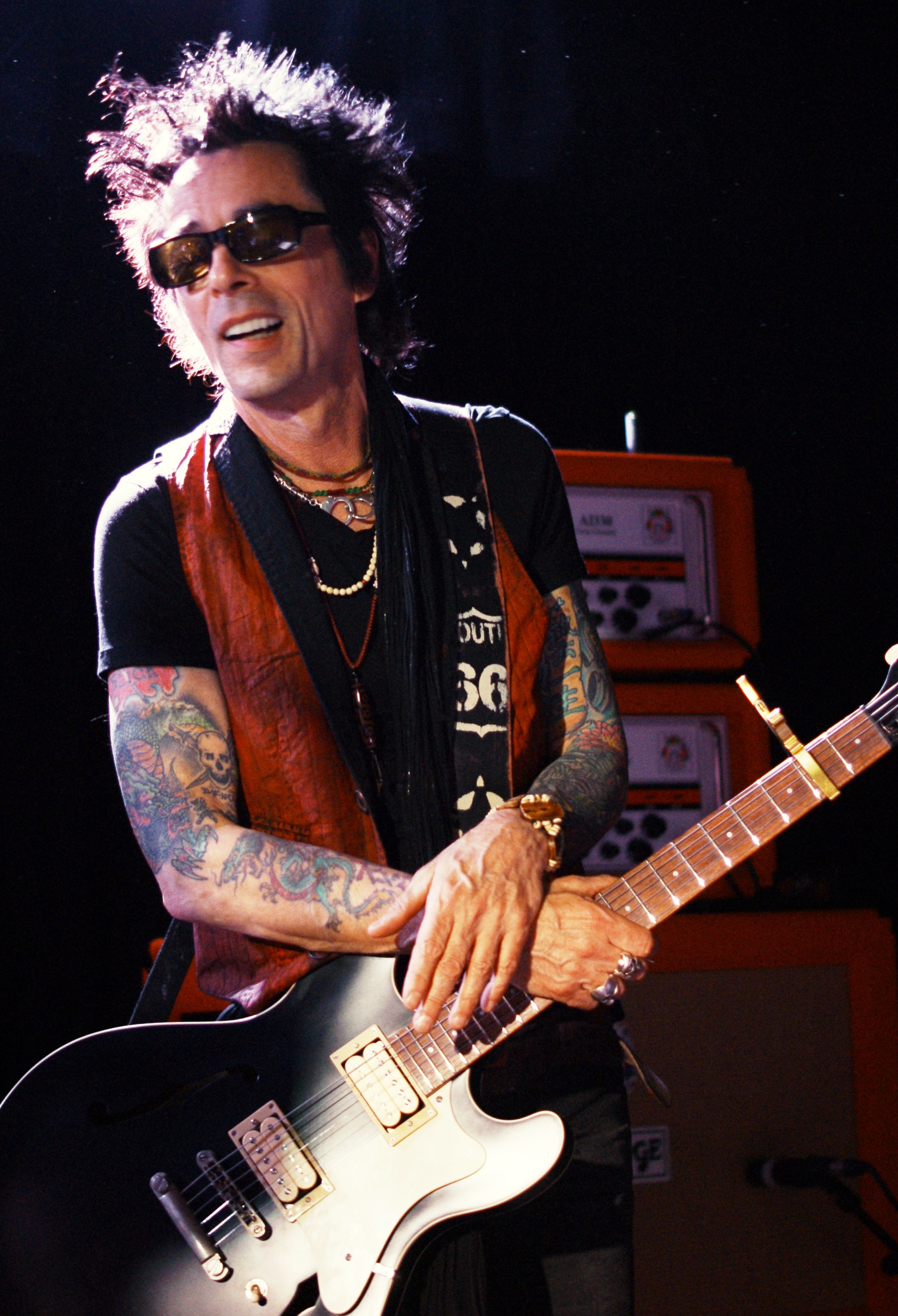
- Slick performing with New York Dolls in 2011

Background information
- Born: Frank Madeloni; October 1, 1952 (age 74); Brooklyn, New York, United States
- Genres: Blues rock; hard rock; alternative rock; punk rock
- Occupations: Musician; songwriter
- Instrument: Guitar
- Years active: 1970s–present
- Website: earlslick.net

Earl Slick (born Frank Madeloni; October 1, 1952, in Brooklyn, New York) is an American guitarist best known for his collaborations with David Bowie, John Lennon, Yoko Ono and Robert Smith. He has also worked with John Waite, Tim Curry and David Coverdale, in addition to releasing several solo recordings, and two records with Phantom, Rocker & Slick, the band he formed with Slim Jim Phantom and Lee Rocker (both from Stray Cats).

== Musical career ==
In the early 1970s, Earl Slick gained his reputation on the New York music scene as a guitarist while playing in a band called Mack Truck featuring singer-songwriter Jimmie Mack and his brother, drummer Jack Mack along with keyboard player and Grammy award-winning mixer Jan Fairchild. His work with Scottish singer-songwriter Jim Diamond was as the duo Slick Diamond. They toured and gave performances for a short time in the late 1970s.

Slick was initially hired by David Bowie, on the recommendation of a friend, to replace Mick Ronson as lead guitarist for the Diamond Dogs tour in 1974 (the live album David Live was recorded during this tour). Slick also played lead guitar on Bowie's Young Americans and Station to Station albums, released in 1975 and 1976 respectively. After disagreements with Bowie's management, Slick was replaced as lead guitarist for the 1976 Station to Station tour by Stacey Heydon. Slick continued working in the studio with former Mott the Hoople frontman Ian Hunter, John Lennon, and Yoko Ono, but also formed his own solo band, releasing both Razor Sharp and Earl Slick Band in 1976. He provided guitar to Carmen Maki's 1979 album Night Stalker. In 1980, Slick formed Silver Condor with east coast singer/writer Joe Cerisano. Silver Condor's first album was released in 1981 on Columbia Records. During the recording Silver Condor's first he was invited to record on Lennon and Ono's Double Fantasy. During the sessions for Double Fantasy, the material for 1984's Milk and Honey was recorded as well. Slick also joined Ono in the studio for her solo album, Season of Glass.

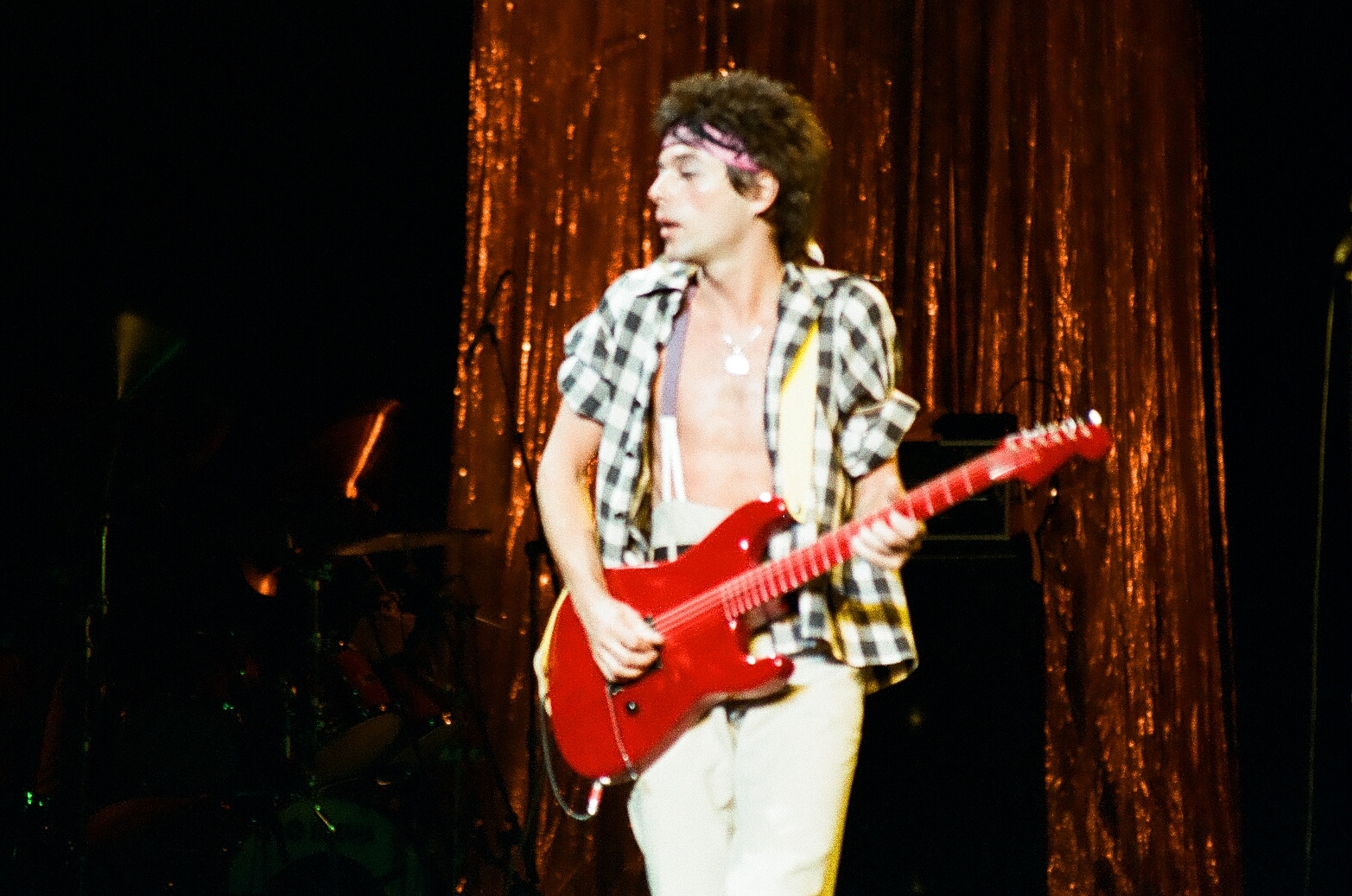
Slick in 1983 during David Bowie's Serious Moonlight Tour

In 1983, Slick rejoined David Bowie's touring band for the Serious Moonlight Tour, which supported the Let's Dance album. Stevie Ray Vaughan had played guitar on the album but left the band right before the tour due to a dispute between his and Bowie's management. Slick was asked to step in as a last-minute replacement due to his prior working relationship with Bowie.

After the Serious Moonlight Tour, Slick played on the Box of Frogs' self-titled album and Game Theory's Distortion EP. At that time, Slick co-founded Phantom, Rocker & Slick with Slim Jim Phantom and Lee Rocker. The band released two records, Phantom, Rocker & Slick and Cover Girl. Rolling Stones' guitarist Keith Richards contributed to the single "My Mistake"—an experience Slick cited as one of the most memorable in his career. Between the two Phantom, Rocker & Slick albums, Slick appeared with Carl Perkins and a host of other musicians including Eric Clapton, George Harrison, Ringo Starr, and Rosanne Cash for 1985's Blue Suede Shoes: A Rockabilly Session.

In 1990, Slick collaborated with David Glen Eisley in the band Dirty White Boy, which released only one album, Bad Reputation (1990), and industry showcases in London and Los Angeles. He also played briefly in Little Caesar in 1991–1992. Working with mentor Michael Kamen, Slick contributed to several soundtracks in the 1990s, including Hudson Hawk and Nothing but Trouble. He released another solo record, In Your Face, in 1991.

In the early 1990s Slick worked for 4 years as a timeshare salesman.

In the early 2000s Slick returned to Bowie's roster, appearing on the studio albums Heathen (2002) and Reality (2003). Slick toured with Bowie in support of those albums as well, and performed on the Bowie DVD and double CD, A Reality Tour. Working with producer Mark Plati Slick released a solo album, Zig Zag, with guest performances by Bowie, Robert Smith, Joe Elliott, Royston Langdon and Martha Davis of The Motels. Slick then contributed guitar tracks to a Mark Plati remix of The Cure's A Forest, which appeared on Join the Dots: B-Sides and Rarities in 2004.

From 2006, he was a member of both The Eons with singer-songwriter Jeff Saphin and Slinky Vagabond. Slinky Vagabond were Glen Matlock, Clem Burke, and Keanan Duffty. Slinky Vagabond (the name comes from the lyrics to the David Bowie song "Young Americans") played their debut concert at the Joey Ramone Birthday Bash in May 2007.

In January 2013, he contributed guitar parts for Bowie on his penultimate album, The Next Day.

In May 2015, Slick joined the Yardbirds, replacing guitarist Top Topham. In August 2015 it was announced that Slick had left the band and was replaced by Johnny A.

In February 2016, he performed a tribute to Bowie at the Brit Awards with Bowie's Reality touring band and the New Zealand singer, Lorde.

== Equipment ==
In 2010, Slick announced that he had begun marketing his own line of customized guitar straps, called Slick Straps, in an exclusive distribution deal with Guitar Fetish, an online guitar customizing shop. In addition to the Slick Straps line, Slick has been quoted as endorsing the GFS line of guitar effects pedals marketed by Guitar Fetish.

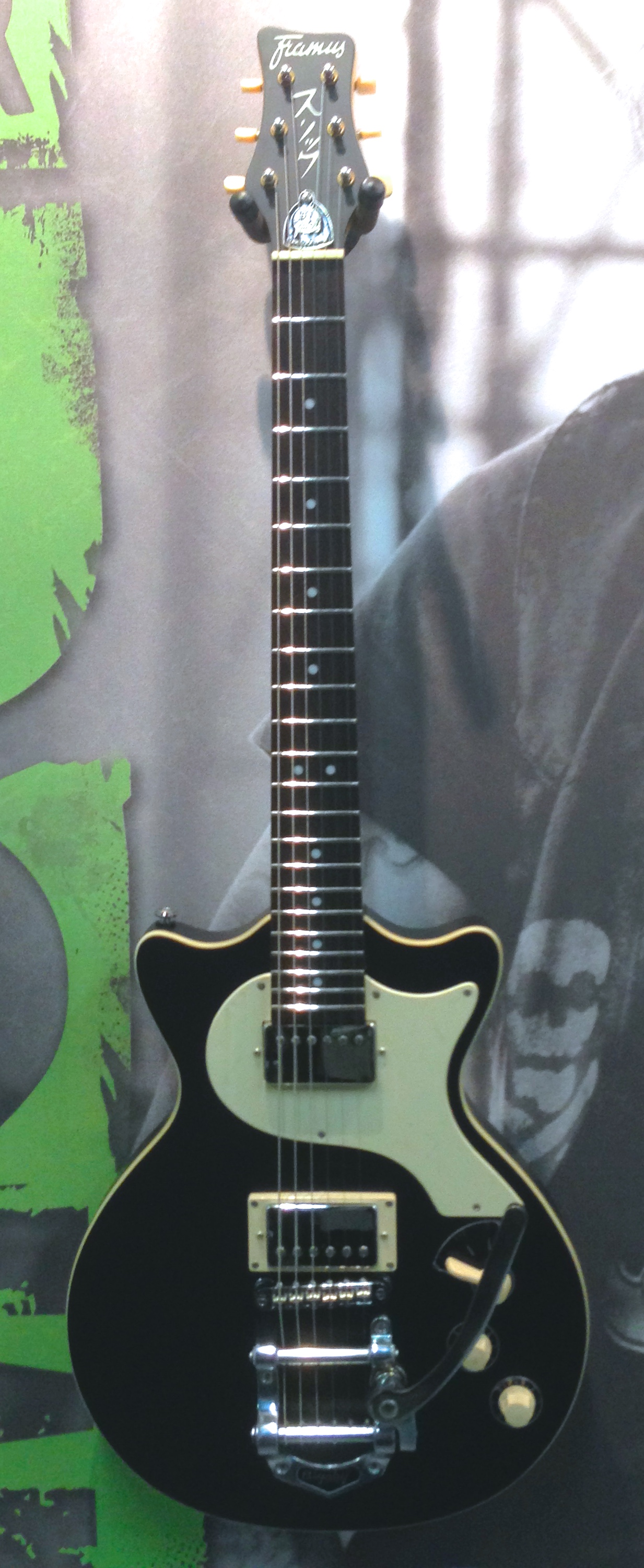
Framus Earl Slick model, Anaheim NAMM Show, 2013

In 2011, Framus International announced the release of the Earl Slick Signature Model guitar.

In 2014, Slick announced the exclusive distribution deal with Guitar Fetish of his own brand of guitars, featuring his own custom-wound pickups, and aged hardware and finishes. Each is a "stripped-down" model, with only a single volume knob for simplicity. There are currently nine models available including the SL-50 and SL-51 (Telecaster copies), the SL-54 (a one-pickup "strat"-style), the SL-57 (3 single-coil pickup Strat copy), the SL-59 (similar to a double-cutaway Les Paul Junior) and the SL-60 (double-cutaway with dual P90 pickups).

== Discography ==
=== Solo ===
- The Earl Slick Band (1976)
- Razor Sharp (1976)
- In Your Face (1991)
- Lost & Found (1998)
- Live '76 (2001)
- Slick Trax (2002)
- Zig Zag (2003)
- Fist Full of Devils (2021)

=== with David Bowie ===
- Ziggy Stardust: The Motion Picture (guitar over-dubs recorded in 1974)
- David Live (1974)
- Young Americans (1975)
- Station to Station (1976)
- Heathen (2002)
- Reality (2003)
- A Reality Tour (2004)
- The Next Day (2013)
- Cracked Actor (Live Los Angeles '74) (RSD 2017 release, concert from 1974 tour) (2017)
- Glastonbury 2000 (live, 3 LP/2 CD/1 DVD) (2018)
- Serious Moonlight (live 1983) (Double live album from 1983 tour released on Loving the Alien Boxset and as a stand-alone CD (only) set in 2019)
- I'm Only Dancing (The Soul Tour 74) (2 LP / 2 CD) (RSD 2020 release, concert from 1974 tour)

=== with Ian Hunter ===
- Overnight Angels (1977)

=== with John Lennon & Yoko Ono ===
- Double Fantasy (1980)
- Milk and Honey (1984)

=== with Yoko Ono ===
- Season of Glass (1981)

=== with Silver Condor ===
- Silver Condor (1981)

=== with Phantom Rocker and Slick ===
- Phantom Rocker and Slick (1986)
- Cover Girl (1986)

=== with Jacques Dutronc ===
- C.Q.F.D...utronc (1987)

=== with Dirty White Boy ===
- Bad Reputation (1990)

=== with Little Caesar ===
- Influence (1992)

=== with David Coverdale ===
- Into the Light (2000)

=== with Chris Catena ===
- Discovery (2009; guest artist)

== Personal life ==
Slick was married to Fanny bassist/singer Jean Millington. He has a daughter and two sons.

== See also ==
- Rock 'n' Roll Guns for Hire: The Story of the Sidemen
