= Birdland (The Yardbirds album) =

Studio album by the Yardbirds
- Released: April 2003
- Recorded: 2001–2003
- Studio: Mothership, Hollywood, California
- Genre: Rock
- Length: 56:52
- Label: Favored Nations
- Producer: Ken Allardyce

The Yardbirds chronology
Ultimate! (2001)	Birdland (2003)	Live! Blueswailing July '64 (2003)

Birdland is a studio album by the reconstituted English rock group the Yardbirds, which was released in 2003, and the band's fifth studio album overall. Original drummer Jim McCarty and rhythm guitarist Chris Dreja reformed the group in 1994 and, for the album, the Yardbirds lineup included lead singer and bassist John Idan, lead guitarist Gypie Mayo, and harmonica player Alan Glen. The album features contributions by several guests, including Joe Satriani, Steve Vai, Slash, Brian May, and original group guitarist Jeff Beck.

The album contains seven new originals, composed mainly by McCarty or Dreja, and eight remakes of classic Yardbirds songs from the 1960s. The song "An Original Man (A Song for Keith)" was dedicated to Keith Relf, original Yardbirds singer who died in 1976.

Birdland reached number 25 on Billboard's Independent Albums chart in the US and number 67 in Germany.

== Critical reception ==
In a review for AllMusic, critic Richie Unterberger gave the album two out of five stars. He noted that while the new lineup cannot be compared to the original, it "is a lot better than you'd expect, and certainly far more respectable than most reunion/comeback efforts by decimated lineups of classic outfits". He added that the remakes of some of the classic Yardbirds songs are "not done badly, though you feel as though you're listening to a really good Yardbirds tribute band rather than the real deal".

Jason McNeil, in a review for PopMatters, wrote: "Perhaps the greatest thing the group has going for it is sounding contemporary without sounding like your run-of-the-mill roadhouse covers band". In going through the album's songs, he praises the remakes of "I'm Not Talking" and "The Nazz Are Blue", but faults those of "Train Kept a Rollin'" and "Over Under Sideways Down".

Dan Forte, writing for Vintage Guitar magazine, believed that McCarty and Dreja were still very strong performers and that new member Gypie Mayo's (formerly guitarist with Dr. Feelgood) "blues roots and over-the-top daring are the perfect combination". He also identified the remakes of "Mister, You're a Better Man Than I" with Brian May on guitar and "Happenings Ten Years Time Ago" with Steve Lukather as "the best cameos".

== Track listing ==
No.	Title	Writer(s)	Guest musician	Length
1.	"I'm Not Talking"	Mose Allison		2:45
2.	"Crying Out for Love"	Jim McCarty		4:37
3.	"The Nazz Are Blue"	Chris Dreja, Jeff Beck, McCarty, Keith Relf, Paul Samwell-Smith	Jeff "Skunk" Baxter	3:12
4.	"For Your Love"	Graham Gouldman	Johnny Rzeznik	3:21
5.	"Please Don't Tell Me 'Bout the News"	McCarty		3:59
6.	"Train Kept a Rollin'"	Tiny Bradshaw, Lois Mann, Howie Kay	Joe Satriani	3:38
7.	"Mr. Saboteur"	McCarty		4:55
8.	"Shapes of Things"	Relf, McCarty, Samwell-Smith	Steve Vai	2:38
9.	"My Blind Life"	Dreja	Jeff Beck	3:33
10.	"Over Under Sideways Down"	Dreja, Relf, McCarty, Beck, Samwell-Smith	Slash	3:16
11.	"Mr. You're a Better Man Than I"	Mike Hugg, Brian Hugg	Brian May	3:24
12.	"Mystery of Being"	McCarty		4:07
13.	"Dream Within a Dream"	McCarty (music), Edgar Allan Poe (lyrics)		4:44
14.	"Happenings Ten Years Time Ago"	Relf, McCarty, Beck, Jimmy Page	Steve Lukather	3:23
15.	"An Original Man (A Song for Keith)"	Dreja, McCarty, John Idan, Gypie Mayo		5:20

== Personnel ==
The Yardbirds

- Chris Dreja – rhythm guitar
- Alan Glen – harmonica, percussion
- John Idan – bass guitar, lead vocals
- Gypie Mayo – lead guitar
- Jim McCarty – drums, percussion, vocals

Additional musicians

- Jeff "Skunk" Baxter – guitar
- Jeff Beck – guitar
- Steve Lukather – guitar
- Brian May – guitar
- Joe Satriani – guitar
- Slash – guitar
- Steve Vai – guitar
- Johnny Rzeznik – guitar and backing vocal
- Martin Ditcham – additional percussion
