= Alan Glen =

British blues harmonica player (born 1951)

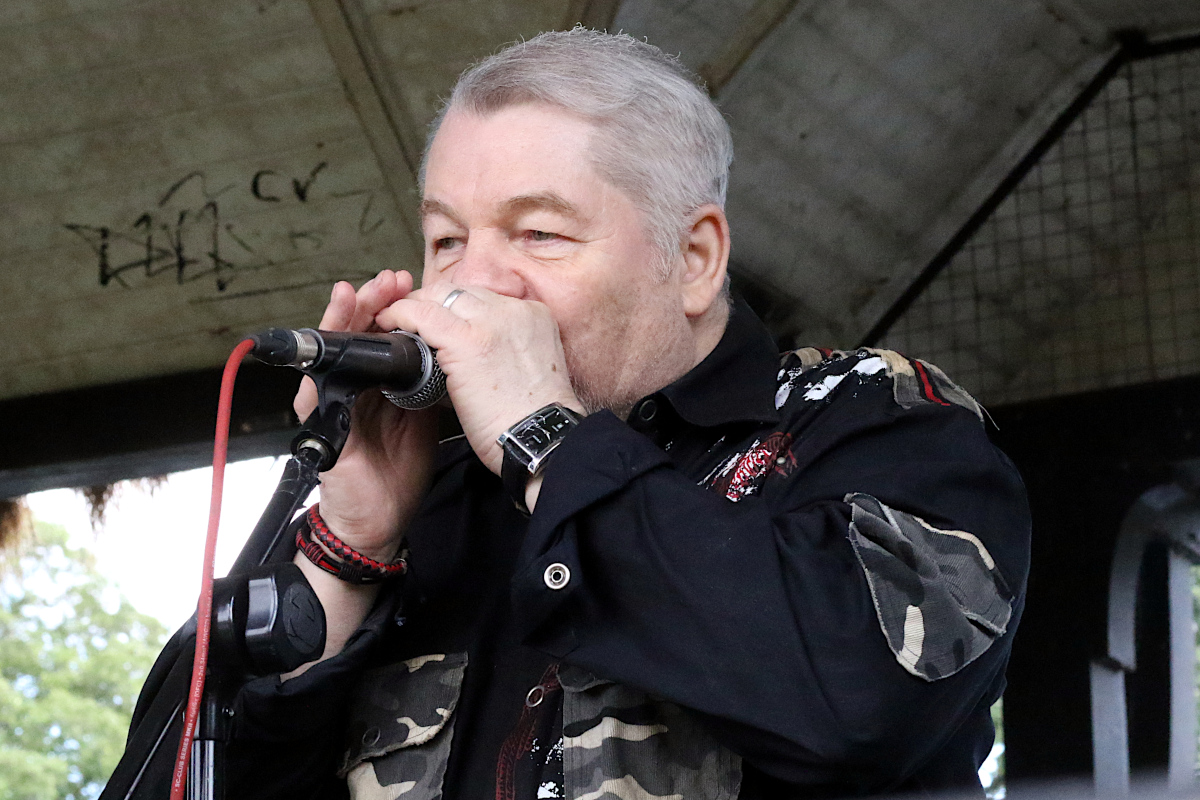
- Glen in 2023

Background information
- Born: 21 December 1951 (age 74)
- Origin: Wuppertal, West Germany
- Genres: Blues; rock; roots reggae
- Occupations: Musician; songwriter
- Instruments: Harmonica; vocals; guitar; percussion
- Labels: China; Favored Nations; I.R.S; M&G; Fat Possum; Big Cat; Real World; Note

Alan Glen (born 21 December 1951) is a British blues harmonica player, best known for his work with The Yardbirds, Nine Below Zero, Little Axe, and his own bands, The Barcodes and The Incredible Blues Puppies.

== Career ==
Glen started playing harmonica after seeing Muddy Waters, and the 'American Folk-Blues Festivals' which visited London in the late 1960s and early 1970s. His early influences being Little Walter, Sonny Boy Williamson, and Junior Wells. Early bands he was involved with were Crowjane Bluesband, The Radical Sheiks and Brothers Grimm, before going on to join Nine Below Zero (1991–1995), and The Yardbirds(1996–2003 and 2008–2009).

Glen has played on over 50 albums and recorded/performed with: Alannah Myles, Jeff Beck, Steve Vai, Slash (on the Yardbirds' album Birdland), John Mayall, Steve Lukather, Skunk Baxter, Lee 'Scratch' Perry, Horace Andy, Junior Delgado, Bernie Marsden, Papa George, Geoff Everett, Gary Fletcher, Gordon Smith, Micky Moody, he has recorded eight albums with Little Axe. In addition he appeared alongside Alan Barnes, Jim Mullen and Roger Cotton on the With Friends Like These album for the Barcodes, which also included Zoot Money. He played with Peter Green, Mick Taylor and Hubert Sumlin at the Long Beach Blues Festival.

He recorded the album On The Road Again with Dr. Feelgood. Other collaborators include Art Themen, Pee Wee Ellis, Dub Syndicate, Paul Cox, Archive (band), Alan Barnes, Little Axe and Gypie Mayo. Glen has played at Brecon Jazz Festival and Nice Jazz Festivals, Hollywood House of Blues, the Hilton, Las Vegas, Sporting Lisbon Stadium, Wembley Arena, Ronnie Scott's Club and The Royal Albert Hall, as well as various television and radio performances.

== Tours ==
Nine Below Zero - 1993 - Spain, Portugal & Scandinavia (with Sting)

Nine Below Zero - 1993 - USA (with Alvin Lee)

Nine Below Zero - 1994 - USA & Canada (with Alannah Myles)

Nine Below Zero - 1994 - 12 Nights at the Royal Albert Hall with Eric Clapton)

Nine Below Zero - 1994 - UK tour (supporting The Kinks)

Nine Below Zero - 1994 - UK tour (supporting Brian May)

Little Axe - 1996 - European tour

The Yardbirds - 1996 - Australia tour

The Yardbirds - 1998 - USA & Canada

The Yardbirds - 2000 - USA & Canada The Yardbirds - 2001 - European Tour

The Yardbirds - 2003 - 'Birdland' tour - USA & Canada

The Yardbirds - 2008 - European tour

Soundcheck magazine referred to Glen as "one of the finest blues harp players and slide guitarists of his generation," and also received praise from Net Rhythms for his harmonica playing.

Glen's original music was used on the soundtrack of the BB King Biopic "Life of Riley"

== Selected discography ==
- The Yardbirds -
  - Birdland (Favored Nations) - 2003
- Nine Below Zero –
  - Off the Hook (China Records) - 1992
  - Hot Music for a Cold Night (I.R.S. Records) - 1994
  - Best of Nine Below Zero (I.R.S. Records) - 1994
  - "Ice Station Zebro" (Pangea Records ) - 1995
  - "'Live' in Europe 1992" (Floating World Records ) - 2011
- Dr. Feelgood –
  - On the Road Again (Grand Records) - 1994
- Little Axe –
  - Slow Fuse - (M&G Records) - 1996
  - Hard Grind - (Fat Possum Records) - 2002
  - Champagne and Grits - (Real World Records) - 2004
  - "Stone Cold Ohio" ( Real World Records ) - 2006
  - Bought for a Dollar, Sold for a Dime" - (Real World Records) - 2010
  - "If You Want Loyalty, Buy a Dog" (On-U Sounds) - 2011
  - "Wanted Live" (LA Records) - 2012
  - London Blues (On-U Sounds) - 2018
- Junior Delgado –
  - Reasons (Big Cat Records) - 1999
- Dub Syndicate –
  - Acres of Space (Lion & Roots) - 2001
  - Rasta Far I (Collision Cause Chap) - 2006
- The Barcodes -
  - Keep your Distance (Note Records) - 2000
  - Independently Blue (Note Records) - 2004
  - With Friends Like These (Note Records) - 2006
  - Live - In Session for the BBC (Note Records) - 2007
  - "Be Cool - The Best of The Barcodes" ( Note Records ) - 2011
- Incredible Blues Puppies -
  - Puppy Fat (Note Records) - 2005
  - In The Doghouse (Note Records) - 2008
- Roger Cotton and Alan Glen -
  - Born in Black & White (Note Records) - 2003
- Gordon Smith -
  - "The Essential Gordon Smith" ( Note Records ) - 2009
  - "Gordon Smith - Live" (Brooks Blues) - 2011

== See also ==
- List of harmonicists
