= Box of Frogs =

English rock band

- Origin: London
- Years active: 1983–1986
- Labels: Epic
- Spinoff of: The Yardbirds
- Past members: Chris Dreja; Paul Samwell-Smith; Jim McCarty; John Fiddler

Box of Frogs were an English rock band formed in 1983 by former members of the Yardbirds, who released their first album in 1984. The core group consisted of Chris Dreja, Paul Samwell-Smith, and Jim McCarty. Vocals on their eponymous album were done by John Fiddler (formerly of Medicine Head and British Lions). On the second album, Fiddler sang on five songs, with guests singers Graham Parker, Ian Dury and Roger Chapman performing the remaining songs. Many musicians guested on their albums (including guitarists Rory Gallagher, Earl Slick and Steve Hackett, harmonica player Mark Feltham, and keyboardists Max Middleton and Peter-John Vettese). Former Yardbirds bandmates Jeff Beck and Jimmy Page played lead guitar on parts of their first and second albums, respectively.

== History ==
The group's formation and unusual band name were explained on the sticker affixed to original LP releases:

On June 23, 1983, as part of London's historic Marquee Club's 25th Anniversary celebrations, three original Yardbirds – Paul Samwell-Smith, Chris Dreja and Jim McCarty – found themselves together on stage again. This same venue had been a regular nightspot for the legendary guitar-based blues-rock band that was the springboard for the likes of Clapton, Beck and Page.

For Paul, Chris and Jim, the reunion made them realize they had to make more music in the Yardbirds' tradition. They added Medicine Head's John Fiddler on vocals to form the nucleus of the band.

On Christmas Eve 1983, Jeff Beck joined them at a recording session at a farmhouse south of London and added his unique touch to four of the tracks. As other old friends jumped into the sessions the idea for the group's new name came about. Now with a fresh spirit and basic rock and roll roots there is a new band from across the pond.

The group showed promise on the first album of rock radio friendly tunes, featuring Jeff Beck. The album was popular on college campuses. Plans were made for a US tour, but it is alleged that Samwell-Smith, Dreja, and McCarty hated the idea of the tour, much to John Fiddler's dismay. Jeff Beck, who along with Dzal Martin was considered as the lead guitarist for such a tour, was reportedly disgusted at his ex-bandmates' refusal to tour America. He took no part on the second album, Strange Land (1986), and Fiddler barely chose to do so before walking out. "Asylum" is one of the few songs Fiddler sang on, and was the only one featuring Page.

The group's two albums, Box of Frogs (1984) and Strange Land (1986), were combined for release on a single CD by Renaissance Records in 1996. AllMusic's Stephen Thomas Erlewine gave the album four and a half out of five stars, although he commented:

Both albums are rather uneven and a little undistinguished, yet they may appeal to fans of mainstream AOR hard rock from the early '80s. For Yardbirds fans, this is essentially a curiosity, since it doesn't have the spark, sound or style of the Yardbirds, despite featuring Jim McCarty, Chris Dreja and Paul Samwell-Smith.

== Personnel ==
- John Fiddler - lead and backing vocals, guitars, percussion, synthesizers
- Chris Dreja - guitar, percussion, occasional backing vocals
- Paul Samwell-Smith - bass guitar, backing vocals, percussion, synthesizers
- Jim McCarty - drums, percussion, backing vocals, keyboards

== Discography ==
=== Albums ===
==== Box of Frogs (1984) ====
Box of Frogs

Studio album by Box of Frogs
- Released: June 1984
- Studio: Ridge Farm
- Genre: Blues rock; arena rock; hard rock
- Length: 46:44
- Producer: Paul Samwell-Smith; John Fiddler

Box of Frogs chronology
| London 1963 – The First Recordings! (by The Yardbirds) (1981) | Box of Frogs (1984) | Interchords (1984) |

===== Track listing =====
All tracks are written by Paul Samwell-Smith, Chris Dreja, Jim McCarty, John Fiddler (except noted).

| No. | Title | Writer(s) | Length |
|---|---|---|---|
| 1. | "Back Where I Started" | | 3:54 |
| 2. | "Harder" | Fiddler, Ray Majors | 3:44 |
| 3. | "Another Wasted Day" | | 4:12 |
| 4. | "Love Inside You" | Fiddler | 2:47 |
| 5. | "The Edge" | | 4:02 |
| 6. | "Two Steps Ahead" | | 4:33 |
| 7. | "Into The Dark" | | 4:07 |
| 8. | "Just A Boy Again" | | 5:38 |
| 9. | "Poor Boy" | | 4:26 |

===== Personnel =====
Box of Frogs

- Paul Samwell-Smith - bass guitar, backing vocals, percussion, synthesizer, producer
- Jim McCarty - drums, percussion, backing vocals
- John Fiddler - lead and backing vocals, acoustic and electric guitar, percussion, synthesizer, assistant producer
- Chris Dreja - rhythm guitar, percussion, backing vocals, photography

Additional musicians

- Jeff Beck - lead guitar (tracks 1, 3, 6, 9)
- Ray Majors - lead guitar, backing vocals, percussion (track 2)
- Dzal Martin - lead guitar (tracks 4, 7, 8), slide guitar (track 4)
- Rory Gallagher - slide guitar (tracks 5, 7), electric sitar (track 7)
- Mark Feltham - harmonica (track 1)
- Guy Barker - trumpet (track 7)
- Peter-John Vettese - keyboards (tracks 1, 3), piano (track 8)
- Max Middleton - keyboards (tracks 2, 4, 5, 7)
- Geraint Watkins - piano (track 9)

Production

- Mark Larson - design
- Gary Edwards - overdubs and mixing
- Max Norman - recording engineer
- Patty Dryden - illustration

==== Strange Land (1986) ====
Strange Land

Studio album by Box of Frogs
- Released: 1986
- Studio: Battery Studios; Island Studios; Redan Recorders; Ridge Farm Studios
- Genre: Arena rock; Blues rock; Hard rock
- Length: 42:05

Box of Frogs chronology
| Interchords (1984) | Strange Land (1986) | Yardbirds ...On Air (by The Yardbirds) |

===== Track listing =====
All tracks are written by Paul Samwell-Smith, Chris Dreja, Jim McCarty (except noted).

| No. | Title | Writer(s) | Lead vocals | Length |
|---|---|---|---|---|
| 1. | "Get it While You Can" | Gary O'Connor | Graham Parker | 3:50 |
| 2. | "You Mix Me Up" | | John Fiddler | 3:22 |
| 3. | "Average" | | Ian Dury | 4:18 |
| 4. | "House on Fire" | | Fiddler | 4:21 |
| 5. | "Hanging from the Wreckage" | | Fiddler | 3:39 |
| 6. | "Heart Full of Soul" | Graham Gouldman | Roger Chapman | 3:50 |
| 7. | "Asylum" | | Fiddler | 4:49 |
| 8. | "Strange Land" | | Chapman | 4:51 |
| 9. | "Trouble" | Samwell-Smith, Dreja, McCarty, Fiddler | Fiddler | 5:40 |

Bonus cassette version tracks:

| No. | Title | Lead vocals | Length |
|---|---|---|---|
| 10. | "I Keep Calling" | Fiddler |
| 11. | "20/20 Vision" | Fiddler |

===== Personnel =====
Box of Frogs

- Paul Samwell-Smith - bass, production, backing vocals
- Jim McCarty - drums, keyboards, backing vocals, percussion
- Chris Dreja - rhythm guitar, percussion
- John Fiddler - vocals on tracks listed above

Additional musicians

- John Knightsbridge - lead guitar (track 1)
- Rory Gallagher - lead guitar (tracks 2, 4, 6), slide guitar (track 4), electric sitar (tracks 5, 6)
- Steve Hackett - lead guitar (tracks 3, 9)
- Dzal Martin - guitar (tracks 4, 7, 9), lead guitar (track 4, (Note: on the outro) 8)
- Jimmy Page - lead guitar (track 7)
- Graham Gouldman - rhythm guitar, backing vocals (track 6)
- Max Middleton - synthesizer (tracks 1, 3), keyboard outro solo (track 3)
- Peter-John Vettese - synthesizer (tracks 2 to 4) emulator synthesizer (track 3, 5, 6, 8, 9), keyboards (track 6)
- Geraint Watkins - piano (track 4)
- David Clayton - keyboards (track 7), synthesizer (track 9)
- Neil Lockwood - backing vocals (track 1)
- Carroll Thompson, Julie Roberts - backing vocals (tracks 2, 4)

Production

- Mark Larson - art direction
- Simon Hanhart - engineer at Battery Studio
- Stephen Street - engineer at island
- Gary Edwards - engineer at Redan Recorders
- Jeremy Allom and Louis Austin - engineers at Ridge Farm
- John H. Howard - illustration
- George Marino - mastering

=== Singles ===
- "Back Where I Started" / "The Edge" - 1984 (UK)
- "Back Where I Started" / "Nine Lives" / "The Edge" - 1984 (UK - 12-inch)
- "Into The Dark" / "X-tracks medley": "Two Steps Ahead" / "Just A Boy Again" / "Harder" / "Another Wasted Day" / "Back Where I Started" - 1984 (UK)
- "Into The Dark" / "X-tracks medley" - 1984 (UK - 12-inch)
- "Two Steps Ahead" / "The Edge" - 1984 (US)
- "Two Steps Ahead" / "Two Steps Ahead" - 1984 (US - 12-inch promo)
- "Average" / "Strange Land" / "I Keep Calling" - 1986 (UK - 12-inch)
- "Heart Full of Soul" - 1986 (Netherlands)

=== Transcription discs ===
- Interchords - 1984
