= John Idan =

American guitarist and singer

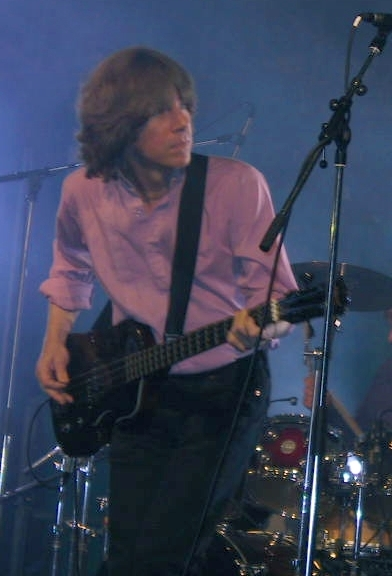
- Idan with the Yardbirds in 2006

Background information
- Born: Detroit, Michigan, U.S.
- Genres: Blues; rock; soul; pop; progressive rock
- Occupation: Musician
- Instruments: Vocals; guitar; bass
- Years active: 1988–present
- Labels: Garden of Idan; Favored Nations; Kissingspell
- Member of: The Yardbirds; The John Idan Group
- Formerly of: The Top Topham – John Idan Band; Ric Lee's Natural Born Swingers
- Website: johnidan.net

John Idan is an American guitarist and vocalist, best known for his work with the Yardbirds, the McCarty Band, and his own bands, the John Idan Group and the Top Topham – John Idan Band.

== Career ==
John Idan, who is originally from Detroit, Michigan, discovered his musical talent at an early age..

Following his high school band, he soon started playing with his first professional band 'The Natural Blues Band' making himself a name around Detroit and southeast Michigan. After the breakup of the Natural Blues Band Idan went on a holiday to London during which he met former Yardbirds' guitarist Top Topham and drummer Jim McCarty. In 1988 he moved to the UK to become the singer and lead guitarist of their blues band. Idan soon became known as 'Detroit' John Idan on the London blues scene.

In 1992 he left the McCarty Band to pursue his own musical interests and founded his band 'Realfire'. Throughout the same time The Yardbirds were reforming. Idan became their lead vocalist and bassist.

Since then Idan has toured the world numerous times with them and has played sold out shows on a variety of world class stages such as The Royal Albert Hall in London; The Royal Festival Hall, the House of Blues in LA (guesting: Steve Vai), South by South West (guesting: Slash) etc. He has recorded two main albums with the Yardbirds, the star-studded Birdland in 2003 and Live at B.B. King Blues Club in 2006. After having been in the band for 14 years, Idan announced his departure in summer of 2008 stating an urge for more creativity and his desire to become a lead guitarist again.

In 2008 he released his debut solo album The Folly on which he plays all the instruments with exception of a string quartet. In the same year he formed his own outfit 'The John Idan Group'. He has since been recording for his 2nd album and worked on various musical projects playing in the UK, Europe and the USA.

In 2015, Idan rejoined The Yardbirds, now as rhythm guitarist. He has also recently been playing guitar and singing with Ric Lee's Natural Born Swingers, a band led by Ric Lee of Ten Years After.

== Selected discography ==
- John Idan –
  - "The Folly" (Garden of Idan) – 2008
- The Yardbirds –
  - Birdland (Favored Nations) – 2003
  - "Live at B.B. King's" (Favored Nations) – 2006
  - "Reunion Concert" – 1991
- The Topham McCarty Band (Kissingspell) – 2002
- The McCarty Band –
  - Two Steps Ahead (Kissingspell) – 2002
- Renaissance Illusion –
  - Through the Fire – 2002
- Beehive (Lord Dome feat. John Idan) – "I Can't Hold On" – 2011
