= The Yardbirds =

English blues and psychedelic rock band

- The Yardbirds, 1966. From left: Jeff Beck, Jimmy Page, Chris Dreja, Keith Relf and Jim McCarty.

Background information
- Origin: London, England
- Genres: Blues rock; psychedelic rock; R&B
- Works: Discography
- Years active: 1963–1968; 1992–present
- Labels: Columbia; Epic
- Spinoffs: Led Zeppelin; Renaissance; Armageddon; Box of Frogs
- Members: Jim McCarty; Kenny Aaronson; John Idan; Myke Scavone; Godfrey Townsend
- Past members: Chris Dreja; Keith Relf; Paul Samwell-Smith; Top Topham; Eric Clapton; Jeff Beck; Jimmy Page; Rod Demick; Laurie Garman; Dylan Henry; Ray Majors; Gypie Mayo; Alan Glen; Billy Boy Miskimmin; Jerry Donahue; Ben King; Andy Mitchell; David Smale; Earl Slick; Johnny A.
- Website: theyardbirds.com

The Yardbirds are an English blues rock band formed in London in 1963. The band started the careers of three of rock's most famous guitarists: Eric Clapton (1963–1965), Jeff Beck (1965–1966) and Jimmy Page (1966–1968), all of whom ranked in the top five of Rolling Stone magazine's 2011 list of 100 greatest guitarists.The Yardbirds were formed in London in 1963 by vocalist and harmonica player Keith Relf and fellow musicians Paul Samwell-Smith, Chris Dreja, Jim McCarty and Anthony “Top” Topham. Relf remained the band's frontman throughout its original 1963–1968 existence and was central to its development from a blues-based club band into one of the most innovative British rock groups of the decade.

During those years, the Yardbirds successively featured three lead guitarists who later became among rock’s most celebrated figures: Eric Clapton, Jeff Beck and Jimmy Page. Their presence has sometimes overshadowed the importance of the band’s founding members, particularly Relf, whose vocals, harmonica playing and songwriting were integral to the Yardbirds’ distinctive sound. The band's other members during 1963–1968 were vocalist/harmonica player Keith Relf, drummer Jim McCarty, rhythm guitarist Chris Dreja, and bassist Paul Samwell-Smith, with Dreja switching to bass when Samwell-Smith departed in 1966. The band had a string of hits in the mid-1960s, including "For Your Love", "Heart Full of Soul", "Evil Hearted You", "Still I'm Sad", "Shapes of Things", "Over Under Sideways Down", and "Happenings Ten Years Time Ago".

Originally a blues-based band noted for their signature "rave-up" instrumental breaks, the Yardbirds broadened their range into pop, mixed raw rockabilly and blues, pioneered psychedelic rock and early hard rock, and contributed to many electric guitar innovations of the mid-1960s. Some rock critics and historians also cite their influence on the later punk rock, progressive rock, and heavy metal trends. Following the band's split in 1968, Relf and McCarty formed Renaissance, and Page formed Led Zeppelin. The Yardbirds re-formed in the 1990s, featuring McCarty and Dreja as the only original members. Dreja left the band in 2012, leaving McCarty as the sole original member of the band.

The band was inducted into the Rock and Roll Hall of Fame in 1992. They were included at No. 89 in Rolling Stone's list of the "100 Greatest Artists of All Time" and ranked No. 37 on VH1's 100 Greatest Artists of Hard Rock.

== History ==
=== Beginnings and Clapton line-up (1963–1965) ===
"Got Love If You Want It"
20 second sample of the Yardbirds cover "Got Love if You Want It" by Slim Harpo, from Five Live Yardbirds

The band formed in the southwest London suburbs in 1963. Relf and Samwell-Smith were originally in a band named the Metropolitan Blues Quartet. After being joined by Dreja, McCarty, and Anthony "Top" Topham, they performed at Kingston School of Art in late May 1963 as a backup band for Cyril Davies. Following a couple of gigs in September 1963 as the Blue-Sounds, they changed their name to the Yardbirds. McCarty claims that Relf was the first to use the name; he may have got it from Jack Kerouac's novel On the Road, where it referred to railroad yard hoboes. He adds that Topham identified it as a nickname for jazz saxophonist Charlie "Yardbird" Parker.

The quintet achieved notice on the burgeoning British rhythm and blues scene when they took over as the house band at the Crawdaddy Club in Richmond, succeeding the Rolling Stones. Their repertoire drew from the Chicago blues of Howlin' Wolf, Muddy Waters, Bo Diddley, Sonny Boy Williamson II, and Elmore James, including "Smokestack Lightning", "Good Morning Little School Girl", "Boom Boom", "I Wish You Would", "Rollin' and Tumblin'", "Got Love if You Want It", and "I'm a Man".

Original lead guitarist Topham left and was replaced by Eric Clapton in October 1963. Crawdaddy Club impresario Giorgio Gomelsky became their manager and first record producer. Under Gomelsky's guidance, the Yardbirds toured Britain as the back-up band for blues legend Sonny Boy Williamson II in December 1963 and early 1964. Recordings from those performances were released two years later during the height of Yardbird popularity on the album Sonny Boy Williamson and the Yardbirds.

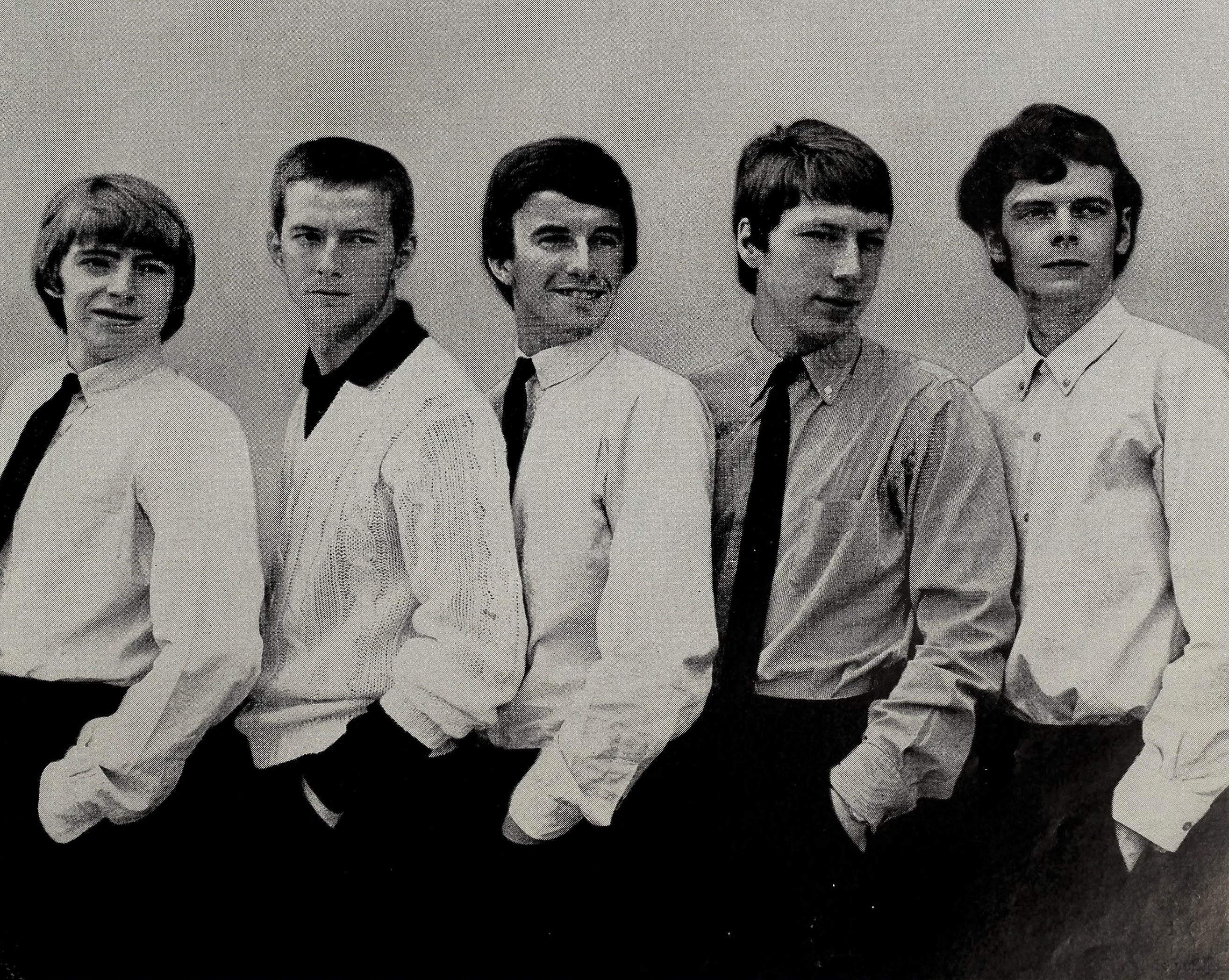
The Yardbirds in 1964. L to R: Keith Relf, Eric Clapton, Jim McCarty, Chris Dreja, Paul Samwell-Smith.

After the tours with Williamson, the Yardbirds signed to EMI's Columbia label in February 1964, and they recorded more live tracks on 20 March at the legendary Marquee Club in London. The resulting album of mostly American blues and R&B covers, Five Live Yardbirds, was released by Columbia nine months later, and it failed to enter the UK Albums Chart. Over time, Five Live gained stature as one of the few high-quality live recordings of the era and as a historical document of both the British rock and roll boom of the 1960s and Clapton's time in the band.

The Clapton line-up recorded two singles, the blues "I Wish You Would" and "Good Morning, School Girl", before the band scored its first major hit with "For Your Love", a Graham Gouldman composition with a prominent harpsichord part by Brian Auger. "For Your Love" was a Top 10 hit in the UK, Canada, and the US, but it displeased Clapton, a blues purist whose vision extended beyond three-minute singles. Frustrated by their commercial approach, he abruptly left the band in March 1965, shortly after the single was released. Soon after, Clapton joined John Mayall & the Bluesbreakers, and Jeff Beck replaced Clapton in the Yardbirds on his friend Jimmy Page's recommendation. The band had first approached Page to replace Clapton, but Page was content with his lucrative sessions work and was worried about both his health and the politics of Clapton's departure. Beck played his first gig with the Yardbirds two days after Clapton's departure.

=== Beck line-up (1965–1966) ===
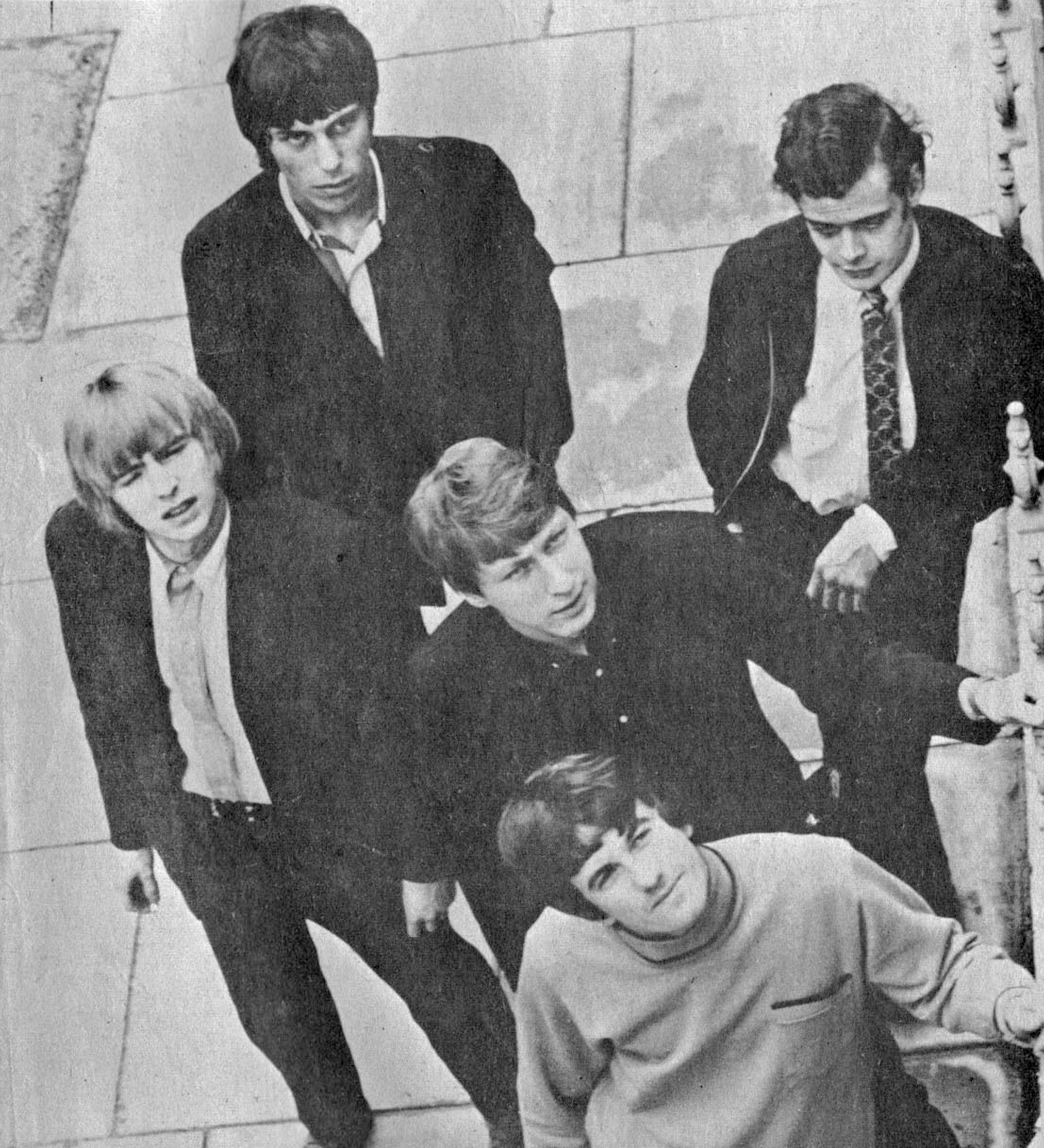
The Yardbirds in 1965. Clockwise from top: Jeff Beck, Paul Samwell-Smith, Chris Dreja, Jim McCarty, Keith Relf.

Beck's exploration of fuzz tone, reverb, feedback, sustain, distortion, and hammer-on soloing fit well into the increasingly raw style of British beat music. The Yardbirds experimented with eclectic arrangements reminiscent of Gregorian chants and various European and Asian styles while Beck infused a pervasive Middle Eastern influence into the mix. Beck was voted No. 1 lead guitarist of 1966 in the British music magazine Beat Instrumental.

The Beck-era Yardbirds produced many groundbreaking recordings, including the hit singles "Heart Full of Soul", "Evil Hearted You"/"Still I'm Sad", a cover of Bo Diddley's "I'm a Man" (US only), "Shapes of Things", and "Over Under Sideways Down", the last from the album Yardbirds (known popularly as Roger the Engineer).

Beck's fuzz-tone guitar riff on "Heart Full of Soul" helped introduce Indian-influenced guitar stylings to the UK singles chart in the summer of 1965. The follow-up, the reverb-laden "Evil Hearted You", furthered the Eastern influence, while its B-side, "Still I'm Sad", featured the band chanting like Gregorian monks. The Diddley cover, "I'm a Man", was hard blues rock and featured the Yardbirds' signature "rave-up", where the tempo shifted to double time and Relf's harmonica and Beck's scratching guitar raced to a climax before falling back into the original beat.

The band embarked on its first US tour in late August 1965. A pair of albums were put together for the US market: For Your Love and Having a Rave Up with the Yardbirds, half of which came from the earlier Five Live Yardbirds album, combined with new tracks such as "You're a Better Man Than I" and "Train Kept A-Rollin'", both recorded with legendary producer Sam Phillips at Sun Studios in Memphis, Tennessee, during the first US tour. There were three more United States tours during Beck's time with the band and a brief European tour in April 1966.

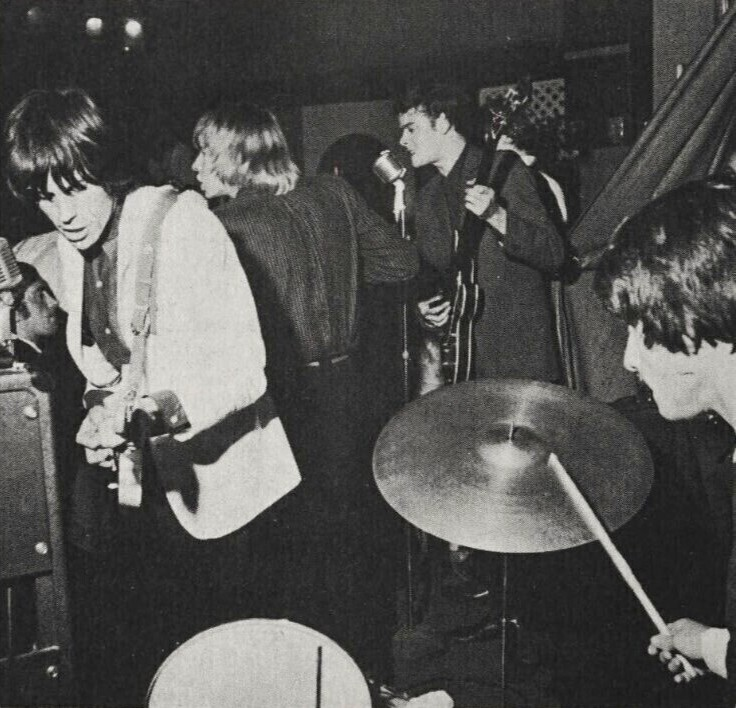
The Yardbirds performing c. early 1966

The single "Shapes of Things", released in February 1966, "can justifiably be classified as the first psychedelic rock classic", according to music journalist Richie Unterberger, and it heralded the coming of British psychedelia three months before the Beatles' "Paperback Writer"/"Rain". Reaching No. 3 on the UK charts and No. 11 in the US, "Shapes" was also the Yardbirds' first self-penned hit, the previous three UK A-sides having been written by Gouldman. Relf's vague anti-war protest lyrics and Beck's feedback-driven, Middle Eastern-influenced solo reflected the band's increasing embrace of psychedelia, as did the UK B-side "You're a Better Man Than I" and the follow-up single, "Over Under Sideways Down". The latter was released in May 1966 and features more quixotic lyrics by Relf and another Eastern-inspired guitar line by Beck.

The "Over Under Sideways Down" sessions took place in April 1966 and produced the album Yardbirds. It was commonly referred to as "Roger the Engineer", which were the words scrawled under a cartoon by Dreja of engineer Roger Cameron that appears on the cover of the UK release. In the US, an abridged version of the album, minus the cartoon cover art, was released as Over Under Sideways Down. The recording session marked the Yardbirds' split with manager Giorgio Gomelsky, as writer Simon Napier-Bell took over management and shared production credit with Samwell-Smith.

The band, led by Relf and McCarty, eschewed cover material, writing the entire album themselves. They were allotted "a whole week" to record the album, according to Dreja, resulting in a "crammed" albeit eclectic mix of blues, hard rock, monkish chanting ("Turn into Earth", "Ever Since the World Began"), and African tribal rhythms ("Hot House of Omagararshid"). Beck's guitar lines were a unifying constant throughout. Roger the Engineer was ranked at No. 350 on Rolling Stone magazine's "500 Greatest Albums of All Time".

=== Beck/Page line-up (1966) ===
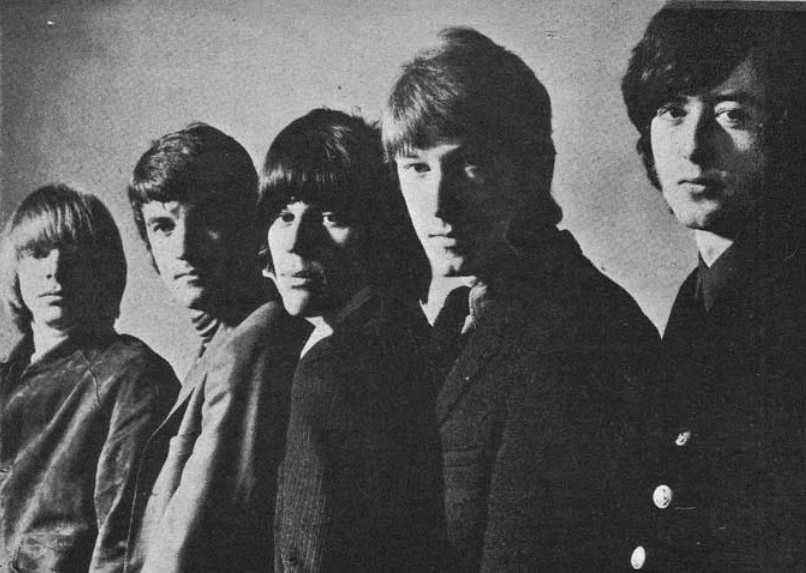
The Yardbirds in 1966. L to R: Keith Relf, Jim McCarty, Jeff Beck, Chris Dreja, Jimmy Page.

Roger the Engineer was released in June 1966. Soon afterward, Samwell-Smith quit the band at a drunken gig at Queen's College in Oxford and embarked on a career as a record producer. Jimmy Page, who was at the show, agreed that night to play bass until rhythm guitarist Dreja could rehearse on the instrument. The band toured with Page on bass, and Beck and Dreja on guitars, playing dates in Paris, the UK, the Midwestern US, and the California coast. Beck fell ill late in the latter tour and was hospitalised in San Francisco. Page took over as lead guitarist at the Carousel Ballroom in San Francisco on 25 August, and Dreja switched to bass. Beck stayed in San Francisco to recuperate with his girlfriend Mary Hughes, while the rest of the band completed the tour. After the Yardbirds reunited in London, Dreja remained on bass and the group's dual lead guitar attack was born.

The Beck/Page lead guitar partnership created the avant-garde/psychedelic rock single "Happenings Ten Years Time Ago" (with future Led Zeppelin bassist John Paul Jones on bass instead of Dreja), which the band recorded in July and September 1966. The single's UK B-side was "Psycho Daisies", two minutes of garage punk sludge featuring Beck on vocals and lead guitar, and Page on bass. The single's B-side in the US, "The Nazz Are Blue", also features a lead vocal by Beck.

The Yardbirds also recorded "Stroll On", a reworking of "Train Kept A-Rollin'", recorded for Michelangelo Antonioni's critically acclaimed film Blow-Up. Relf changed the song's lyrics and title to avoid having to seek permission from the copyright holder. Their appearance in the film, about a hip fashion photographer (played by David Hemmings) undergoing an existential crisis in Swinging London, came after the Who declined and the In-Crowd were unable to attend the filming. Andy Warhol's "Factory" band the Velvet Underground was also considered for the part but was unable to acquire UK work permits. Director Antonioni instructed Beck to smash his guitar in emulation of the Who's Pete Townshend. The guitar that Beck destroys in the film was a cheap Höfner instrument.

The Beck/Page line-up recorded little else in the studio. No live recordings of the dual-lead guitar lineup have surfaced except for "Great Shakes", a commercial recorded for Great Shakes milkshakes using the opening riff of "Over Under Sideways Down", included on the 1992 Little Games Sessions & More compilation.

One recording made by Beck and Page in May 1966, just weeks before Page joined the Yardbirds, was "Beck's Bolero". This piece was inspired by Ravel's "Bolero" and credited to Page (although Beck also claims to have written the song), with John Paul Jones on bass, Keith Moon on drums, and Nicky Hopkins on piano. Around the time of this session, the idea of a "supergroup" involving Beck, Page, Moon, and Who bassist John Entwistle originated, with Entwistle suggesting it would "go over like a lead balloon" and Moon quipping that they could call the band "Lead Zeppelin". Although all the musicians remained with their bands, Page recalled the conversation in 1968 when deciding on the name for Led Zeppelin. "Beck's Bolero" was first released in 1967 as the B-side of Beck's first solo single, "Hi Ho Silver Lining", and was included the following year on the Jeff Beck Group's debut album, Truth.

The Yardbirds opened for the Rolling Stones' 1966 UK tour with Ike & Tina Turner, Peter Jay, and Long John Baldry also on the bill. The band released the "Happenings" single, shot their scenes in Blow-Up, and then headed back to the US for a show at the Fillmore Auditorium in San Francisco. They also performed a slot on American Bandstand host Dick Clark's "Caravan of Stars" tour, which they joined in Texas. After a few shows with the Caravan, Beck stormed out and headed back to San Francisco and Mary Hughes. The band, still in Texas, continued on the Dick Clark tour as a quartet, with Page as the sole lead guitarist. They caught up with Beck in late November, at which point Beck officially left the band. Beck's lack of professionalism, his temper, Relf's drunkenness, the gruelling and unrewarding Dick Clark Caravan, and other pressures were cited, none of which involved Beck being fired. The Yardbirds finished their remaining US dates with Page as sole lead guitarist and headed back to the UK for more shows scheduled by Napier-Bell.

=== Page line-up and split (1966–1968) ===
Page introduced playing the guitar with a cello bow, which was suggested to him by violinist David McCallum Sr.. Page also introduced the combination of a wah-wah pedal with a distortion fuzzbox. Other innovations included the use of a taped noise loop in live settings (as heard n the psychedelic dirge "Glimpses") and open-tuned guitar to enhance the sitar-like sounds the Yardbirds were known for.

Meanwhile, the act's commercial fortunes were declining. "Happenings Ten Years Time Ago" had only reached No. 30 on the US Hot 100 and had fared worse in the U.K. The band dropped Napier-Bell and entered into a partnership with Columbia Records hit-making producer Mickie Most, who was known for his work with the Animals, Herman's Hermits, and Donovan, yet this move failed to reignite their chart success. Most was hired by the Yardbirds' label to broaden their pop appeal and rectify their waning chart performance; however, the band's change in sound under his direction was poorly received. After the disappointing sales of "Happenings", the single "Little Games" released in March 1967 flopped so badly in the UK (where it was backed by "Puzzles") that EMI did not release another Yardbirds record there until after the band broke up. A 1968 UK release of the "Goodnight Sweet Josephine" single was planned but cancelled. A version of Tony Hazzard's "Ha Ha Said the Clown" (recorded by Relf with session musicians and none of the other Yardbirds), backed by the Relf–McCarty original "Tinker Tailor, Soldier Sailor", was the band's last single to enter the US Top 50, peaking at No. 44 on the Billboard chart in the summer of 1967.

Epic released The Yardbirds Greatest Hits in the US in March 1967. Greatest Hits described to the Yardbirds' growing American audience an almost complete picture of "what made the Yardbirds a great band", according to AllMusic critic Bruce Eder. In the description by author Greg Russo, the compilation also presented young garage rock musicians of the psychedelic era with a handy textbook of the band's work during 1965–66. Greatest Hits was the Yardbirds' best-selling US album release, peaking at No. 28 on the Billboard chart. The band spent the first half of 1967 touring Australia, New Zealand, Denmark, and France (including a stop in Cannes to help promote Blow-Up). They also played a handful of shows in the UK in June, before heading to Vancouver to begin their fourth tour of North America with Page.

Their final album, Little Games, was released in July 1967, again only in the US. It was a commercial and critical non-entity. A cover of Harry Nilsson's "Ten Little Indians" charted briefly in the US. The Yardbirds spent much of the rest of that year touring in the US with new manager Peter Grant, and their live shows became heavier and more experimental. The band rarely played their 1967 Mickie Most-produced singles onstage, preferring to mix the Beck-era hits with blues standards and experimental psychedelia, such as "Glimpses", a Page-written piece from Little Games featuring bowed guitars, pre-recorded noise loops, and a hypnotic wah-wah guitar groove. They also covered the Velvet Underground ("I'm Waiting for the Man"), Bob Dylan ("Most Likely You Go Your Way And I'll Go Mine") and American folk singer Jake Holmes, whose "Dazed and Confused" with an overhauled arrangement by Page and lyrics modified by Relf, was shaped in fall of 1967 and a live fixture of the final American tour in 1968. "Dazed and Confused" went down so well that Page selected it for the first Led Zeppelin record, on which it appears with further revised lyrics and Page credited as the writer. Page and Holmes would settle on an "Inspired by" credit for Holmes in 2011.

By 1968, the psychedelic blues rock of the Jimi Hendrix Experience and former Yardbird Eric Clapton's band Cream was enormously popular, yet Relf and McCarty wished to pursue a style influenced by folk and classical music. Page wanted to continue with the kind of "heavy" music for which Led Zeppelin would become iconic. Dreja was developing an interest in photography. By March, Relf and McCarty had decided to leave the band but were persuaded by the other two to stay at least for one more American tour. The band's final single was recorded in January 1968 and released two months later. Reflecting the divergences of the band members and their producer, the A-side, "Goodnight Sweet Josephine", was another Mickie Most-produced pop single, while the B-side, "Think About It", featured a proto-Zeppelin Page riff and snippets of the "Dazed and Confused" guitar solo. It failed to chart on the Billboard Hot 100.

A concert and some album tracks were recorded in New York City in March and early April (including the unreleased song "Knowing That I'm Losing You", an early version of a track that would be re-recorded by Led Zeppelin as "Tangerine"). All were shelved at the band's request, but after Led Zeppelin became successful Epic tried to release the concert material as Live Yardbirds: Featuring Jimmy Page. The album was quickly withdrawn after Page's lawyers filed an injunction. The Yardbirds played their final shows on 31 May and 1 June at the Shrine Auditorium in Los Angeles and on 4 and 5 June at the Spring Fair at the Montgomery International Speedway in Alabama. The Los Angeles shows were documented in the bootleg release Last Rave-Up in L.A. Relf and McCarty left the Yardbirds on 12 June ("Two Yardbirds Fly"). The remaining band returned home to play one last show, on 7 July 1968, at the College of Technology in Luton, Bedfordshire, supported by the Linton Grae Sound.

=== The New Yardbirds/Led Zeppelin (1968) ===
Page and Dreja, with a tour of Scandinavia scheduled for late summer 1968, saw the break-up as an opportunity to put a new lineup together, with Page as producer and Grant as manager. Page initially described his vision for the new band as "a new sort of collage of sound" that would include mellotron keyboard while still featuring the guitar. Drummers B.J. Wilson of Procol Harum, Paul Francis, and session man Clem Cattini, who had guested on more than a few Yardbirds tracks under Most's supervision, were considered for the band, as was vocalist and composer Terry Reid. Reid declined because of a new recording contract with Most, and Reid recommended the then-unknown Robert Plant. Plant, in turn, recommended his childhood friend John Bonham as a drummer. Dreja bowed out to pursue a career as a rock photographer.

Bassist/keyboardist/arranger John Paul Jones, who had worked with Page on countless sessions including several with the Yardbirds, approached Page and offered to be the new bassist. Rehearsals began in mid-August 1968; in early September, Page's revised Yardbirds embarked as the New Yardbirds on the Scandinavian tour, after which the band returned to the UK to produce what would become the debut Led Zeppelin album.

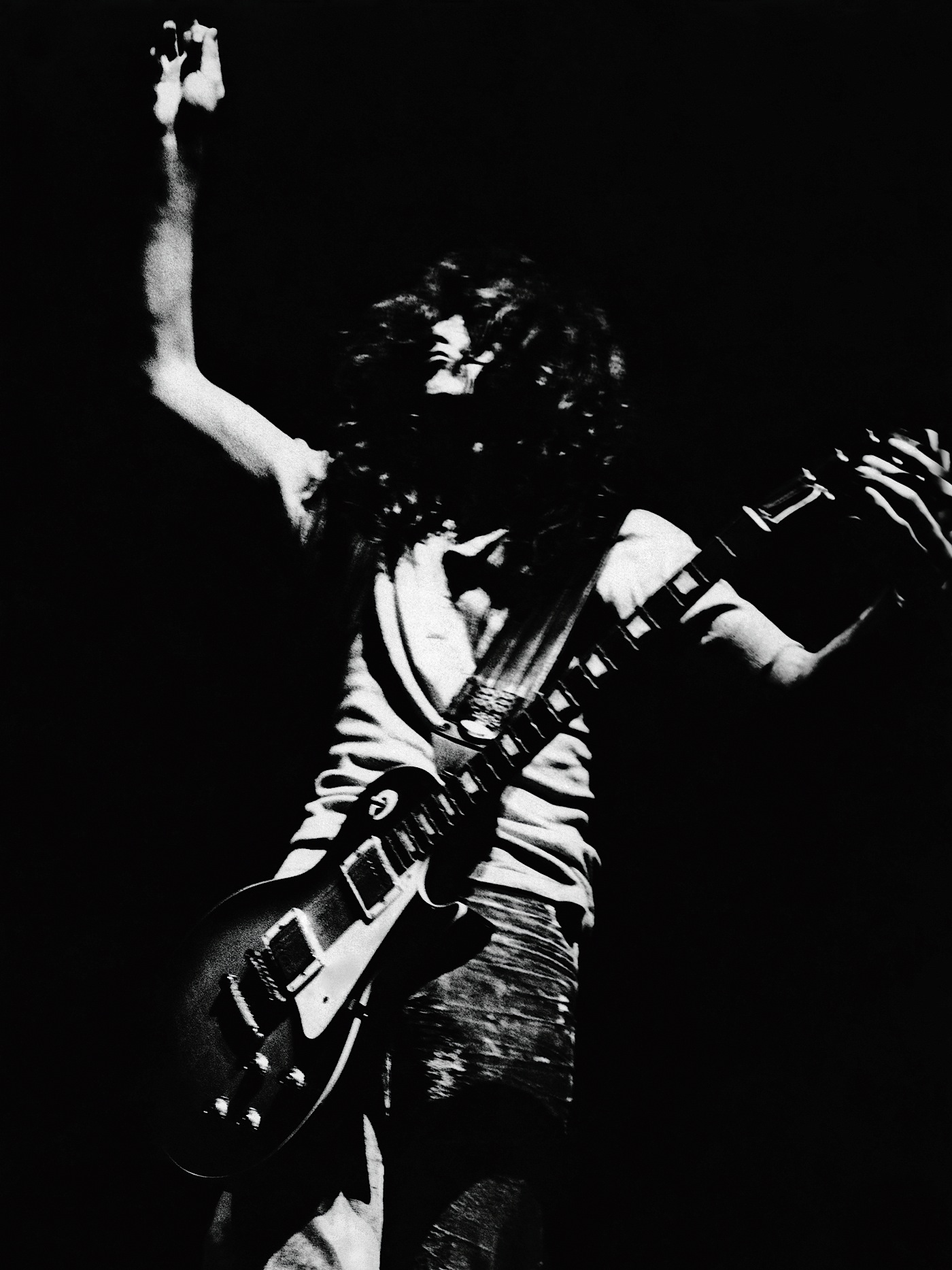
Jimmy Page onstage with Led Zeppelin, 1969

While Page's new roster still played a few songs from the Yardbirds' canon – usually "Train Kept a-Rollin'", "Dazed and Confused" or "For Your Love" and snatches of Beck's "Shapes of Things" solo – a name (and identity) change was in order in October 1968. They appeared on contracts, promotional material, ticket stubs and other collateral as "The Yardbirds" or "The New Yardbirds" for three shows in October 1968, with the Marquee Club date reported as the Yardbirds' "farewell London appearance" and the Liverpool University show 19 October advertised as the Yardbirds' "last ever appearance". This may have been motivated, at least in part, by a cease-and-desist order from Dreja, who claimed that he maintained legal rights to "The Yardbirds" name, although most sources indicate that Page and Grant fully intended to change the name after they returned from Scandinavia with or without the nudge from Dreja. From 19 October 1968 onwards, they were Led Zeppelin, the name taken from the Who band members Moon and Entwistle's "lead balloon" discussion of the "supergroup" that had played on the "Beck's Bolero" sessions in May 1966. The spelling of "lead" was changed to avoid confusion over the pronunciation. This effectively marked the end of the Yardbirds for the next 24 years.

=== After the Yardbirds (1968–1992) ===
Relf and McCarty formed an acoustic rock band called Together and then Renaissance, which recorded two albums for Island Records over two years. McCarty formed the band Shoot in 1973. Relf, after producing albums for Medicine Head (with whom he also played bass) and Saturnalia, resurfaced in 1975 with a new quartet, Armageddon; a hybrid of heavy metal, hard rock and folk influences, which now included former Renaissance bandmate Louis Cennamo, drummer Bobby Caldwell (previously a member of Captain Beyond and Johnny Winter), and guitarist Martin Pugh (from Steamhammer, Rod Stewart's An Old Raincoat Won't Ever Let You Down, and most recently in 7th Order). They recorded one promising album before Relf died in an electrical accident in his home studio on 12 May 1976. In 1977, Illusion was formed, featuring a reunited lineup of the original Renaissance, including McCarty and Keith's sister Jane Relf.

At the Marquee Club in London on 23 June 1983, McCarty, Dreja, and Samwell-Smith reunited for a 20th anniversary show as the Yardbirds, with singer John Fiddler (ex-Medicine Head) and guitarist John Knightsbridge, Jeff Beck, and Jimmy Page making guest appearances. This show eventually led to a short-lived Yardbirds semi-reunion group called Box of Frogs, which occasionally included Beck and Page plus various friends (including Fiddler and Knightsbridge) with whom they had all recorded over the years. The group recorded two albums for Epic, the self-titled Box of Frogs (1984) and Strange Land (1986).

McCarty was also part of the British Invasion All-Stars with members of Procol Harum, the Creation, the Nashville Teens, the Downliners Sect, and the Pretty Things. Phil May and Dick Taylor of the Pretty Things, together with McCarty, recorded two albums in Chicago as the Pretty Things–Yardbirds Blues Band – The Chicago Blues Tapes 1991 and Wine, Women, Whiskey, both produced by George Paulus.

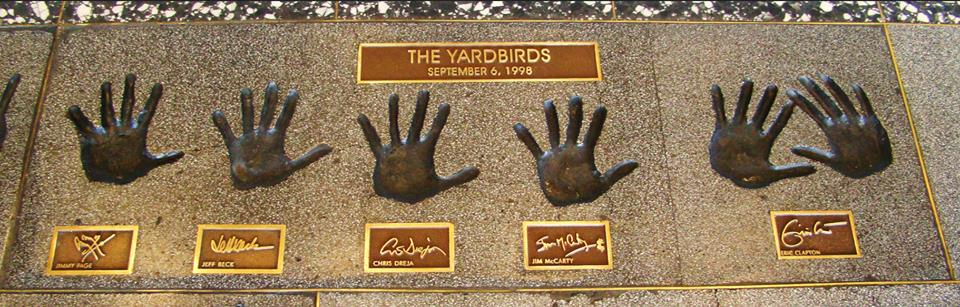
1998 handprints of members of the Yardbirds at the Rock and Roll Hall of Fame: (left to right) Page, Beck, Dreja, McCarty, Clapton

The Yardbirds were inducted into the Rock and Roll Hall of Fame in January 1992. Nearly all the surviving musicians who had been part of the band's heyday, including Beck and Page, appeared at the ceremony (original lead guitarist Top Topham was not included). Clapton, whose Hall of Fame induction was the first of three, was unable to attend because of his obligations while recording and working on a show for the MTV Unplugged series.

=== Re-formation (1992–present) ===
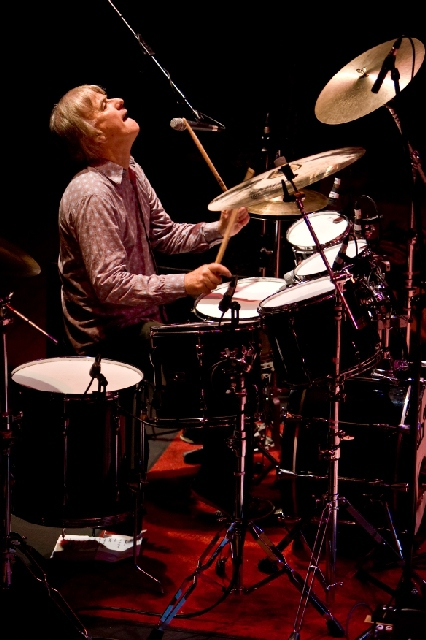
Jim McCarty onstage, 2008

In 1992 Peter Barton from Rock Artist Management contacted Jim McCarty about the prospect of reforming the Yardbirds. McCarty was interested but only if Chris Dreja would agree, but at the time he thought it highly unlikely that Dreja would want to tour again. Barton then contacted Dreja, who agreed to give it a try. Their debut gig was booked at the Marquee Club in London along with the newly reformed Animals. It was a great success. The lineup featured John Idan on guitar (later bass) and lead vocals. Barton managed the band and booked all their dates for more than a decade; he still works with the band on occasion.

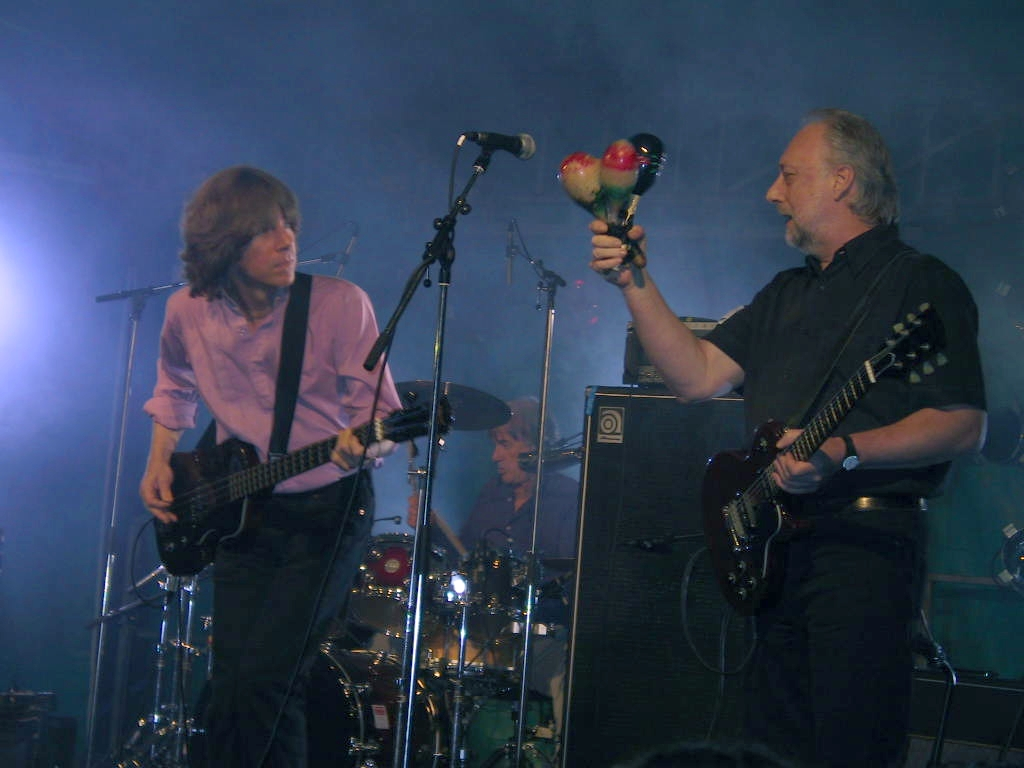
The Yardbirds at Langueux, France, 9 September 2006. L to R: John Idan, Jim McCarty (behind the drums) and Chris Dreja. Photo: Corentin Lamy.

Along with McCarty, Dreja and Idan, the reunited 1992 Yardbirds lineup featured Rod Demick (bass, harmonica, backing vocals) from McCarty's eponymous band. Months later Demick left, and Ray Majors (formerly from the Mott the Hoople offshoot band Mott) joined on lead guitar, while Idan moved to bass, and Laurie Garman also joined on harmonica. A recording of the Jim McCarty Band featuring Demick and Idan was released under the Yardbirds name as Reunion Jam.

In 1996 Majors was replaced by Gypie Mayo, and later that year, Garman was replaced by Alan Glen.

In 2003 a new album by The Yardbirds, Birdland, was released on the Favored Nations label by a lineup including Chris Dreja, Jim McCarty, Gypie Mayo (lead guitar, backing vocals), John Idan (bass, lead vocals) and Alan Glen (harmonica, backing vocals). The album is a mixture of new material mostly penned by McCarty and re-recordings of some of their greatest hits. Guest appearances include Joe Satriani, Steve Vai, Slash, Brian May, Steve Lukather, Jeff "Skunk" Baxter, John Rzeznik, Martin Ditchum, and Simon McCarty. Also, Jeff Beck reunited with his former bandmates on the song "My Blind Life" and their first guitarist from the 1960s, Top Topham, made a rare guest appearance onstage in 2005.

After the release of Birdland, Mayo was replaced briefly by Jerry Donahue, and subsequently in 2005 by the then 20-year-old guitarist Ben King, while Glen was replaced by Billy Boy Miskimmin from Nine Below Zero fame.

In 2007, the Yardbirds released a live CD, recorded on 19 July 2006, titled Live at B.B. King Blues Club, featuring the McCarty, Dreja, Idan, King, and Miskimmin line-up. The first episode of the 2007/08 season of The Simpsons featured the Yardbirds' "I'm a Man" from the album.

According to his website, Idan resigned from the Yardbirds in August 2008, although his last gig with them was on Friday 24 April 2009, when they headlined the first concert in the new Live Room venue at Twickenham rugby stadium. This was also Glen's last gig with the band after temporarily standing in when Miskimmin was unavailable. Idan and Glen were replaced by Andy Mitchell (lead vocals, harmonica, acoustic guitar) and David Smale (bass, backing vocals), brother of the virtuoso guitarist Jonathan Smale. Dreja sat out the US spring 2012 tour to recover from an illness. In 2013, Dreja left the band for medical reasons; he was replaced by original Yardbirds guitarist Topham.

By December 2014 the then-current lineup of the Yardbirds had disbanded. In an email McCarty said he would be "working on solo ventures and other Yardbirds projects in 2015". However, the Yardbirds continued to tour in 2015.

In May 2015, Topham left the band and was replaced by Earl Slick, although Slick never played a gig with the band.

On 17 October 2015, the Yardbirds played the Eel Pie Club in Twickenham, west London, with a line-up of Jim McCarty, John Idan, Ben King, David Smale and Billyboy Miskimmin. Boston-based guitarist Johnny A. became the newest member of the Yardbirds for their North American tour running from 30 October to 22 November 2015. Johnny A. continued to tour as the Yardbirds' lead guitarist from 2016 to 2018, performing a total of 110 shows before departing. His last show with the Yardbirds was on 23 June 2018 at The Egyptian Theater in Park City, Utah. Former Ram Jam harmonica player Myke Scavone joined the band at the end of 2015.

On 15 April 2016, the band played at the Under the Bridge venue in London with a line-up of Jim McCarty, John Idan, Johnny A, Kenny Aaronson and Billyboy Miskimmin.

Dreja died in a London nursing home on 25 September 2025 at age 79.

== Musical style ==
Along with John Mayall & the Bluesbreakers, the Yardbirds were part of the British blues scene of the 1960s. As the blues rock genre developed, some acts like Chicken Shack were playing a louder and more aggressive style, while the Yardbirds emphasized instrumental textures and extended instrumental improvisations. They covered blues classics like Howlin' Wolf's "Smokestack Lightning" (1956) and Bo Diddley's 1955 "I'm a Man" which had a repetitive structure where instrumental solos were brief breaks between repetition of verses. The Yardbirds often extended these instrumental sections into "heavy jams". Music journalist Phil Smee referred to their single "Happenings Ten Years Time Ago" as freakbeat, connecting earlier beat music with the 1966 current of psychedelic experimentation. Jon "Mojo" Mills writing in Shindig! magazine similarly referred to "What Do You Want" from Roger the Engineer as freakbeat.

== Members ==
Current members

- Jim McCarty – drums, percussion, backing vocals (1963–1968, 1992–present)
- John Idan – lead vocals (1995–2009, 2015–present), lead guitar (1992–1994), bass (1994–2009), rhythm guitar (2015–present)
- Kenny Aaronson – bass (2015–present)
- Myke Scavone – harmonica, percussion, backing vocals (2015–present)
- Godfrey Townsend – lead guitar, backing vocals (2018–present)

Timeline

== Discography ==
- Five Live Yardbirds (1964, UK)
- For Your Love (1965, US)
- Having a Rave Up with the Yardbirds (1965, US)
- Yardbirds (aka Roger the Engineer) (1966, UK)
- Over Under Sideways Down (1966, US)
- Little Games (1967, US)
- Birdland (2003)

== See also ==
- Freakbeat
- Swinging London
