= Top Topham =

English guitarist (1947–2023)

- Also known as: Sanderson Topham
- Born: Anthony Topham; 3 July 1947; Southall, England
- Died: 23 January 2023 (aged 75) London, England
- Genres: Blues, blues-rock
- Occupation: Musician
- Instrument: Guitar
- Years active: 1963–1970, 1988–2023
- Labels: Blue Horizon, CBS, Sony
- Website: toptopham.com

Anthony "Top" Topham (3 July 1947 – 23 January 2023) was an English musician and visual artist who was best known as a blues guitarist and also for being the first lead guitarist of The Yardbirds. Topham left the band before they achieved mainstream popularity and was replaced by Eric Clapton, the first of three lead guitarists from the Yardbirds to gain an international reputation (the other two being Jeff Beck and Jimmy Page).

Aside from his musical career, Topham also worked as an interior designer and painter.

== Biography ==
=== The Yardbirds ===
In May 1963, Topham and his friend at secondary school, Chris Dreja, visited the Railway Hotel in Norbiton. The hotel's entertainment featured traditional jazz music in the upstairs lounge, and allowed budding musicians to play during the breaks. There, Dreja and Topham met singer and harmonica player Keith Relf, bassist Paul Samwell-Smith, and drummer Jim McCarty and decided to form The Yardbirds, with Topham as lead guitarist. Two weeks later, they played their first gig at the Eel Pie Island, supporting the Cyril Davies All-Stars. Two months after the formation of the Yardbirds, Giorgio Gomelsky offered them the residency at the Crawdaddy Club and became their manager. As the Yardbirds had to turn professional, Topham faced parental disapproval coupled with the anxiety of abandoning his art studies. He could not devote himself to the Yardbirds full-time and he left. His replacement was a fellow art student from the same secondary school, Eric Clapton.

Topham recalled, "I was only 15 then, three or four years younger than the rest, and there was no way my parents would let me go out five or six nights a week to play music, even though I was already bringing home double what my father was earning. I was going on to Epsom Art School and they wanted me to take it seriously. Eric Clapton was the obvious person to replace me. Later on, I didn't regret leaving because they'd moved away from the blues music that I was interested in. Even if I'd stayed with them to become professional, I think I would have left later for the same reasons Eric left."

=== Post-Yardbirds ===
Topham went on to art college, where he formed bands with his friend Duster Bennett. He joined Winston G and the Wicked (later renamed The Fox), playing alongside Marc Bolan.

After a final gig with Winston G at London's Roundhouse, Topham revived his association with Bennett, recording a live album with him. This led to an introduction to Mike Vernon and his Blue Horizon label. Topham became a session musician for Blue Horizon, playing with Peter Green and Christine McVie.

Topham recorded a solo album for Blue Horizon, Ascension Heights. While Bennett was touring with John Mayall in 1970, Topham fell seriously ill and had to abandon the music industry again. Topham joined the spiritual movement Subud, in which he participated for the rest of his life, taking first the name Rashid and then Sanderson.

Upon his recovery two years later, he entered the fine-arts business, but a chance meeting with Jim McCarty led Topham to return to the blues in 1988. The Topham-McCarty Band was formed and played for two years until Topham decided in July 1990 to pursue country blues. As a session musician he played 12-string guitar on "Broken Waltz Time" on the Bill Morrissey album, Night Train (Philo Records). Later, Topham and Jim McCarty teamed up again to contribute the track "Drifting" for the double album Rattlesnake Guitar: The Music of Peter Green.

In the 2000s, Topham guested with the latest edition of The Yardbirds under the co-leadership of McCarty and Dreja, and performed with John Idan in sporadic concerts of his own. He also played alongside eminent boogie-woogie pianist Bob Hall. He officially became a member of The Yardbirds again in 2013, replacing Dreja, who was forced to leave the band for medical reasons. In May 2015, Topham left The Yardbirds and was replaced by Johnny A.

== Death ==
Topham died on 23 January 2023, at the age of 75. No cause of death was given. Topham's death came thirteen days after that of Yardbirds member Jeff Beck.

== Discography ==
- 2008 – The Complete Blue Horizon Sessions – Top Topham – producer : Mike Vernon

== Bibliography ==
- M. Bane (1982), White Boy Singin' the Blues, London: Penguin, ISBN 0-14-006045-6.
- Bob Brunning (1986, 1995, 2002), Blues: The British Connection, Helter Skelter Publishing: London, ISBN 1-900924-41-2 (Second edition 1995 known as: Blues in Britain).
- Bob Brunning (1990, 1998), The Fleetwood Mac Story: Rumours and Lies, Omnibus Press: London, ISBN 0-7119-6907-8
- Martin Celmins (1995, 1998, 2003), Peter Green – Founder of Fleetwood Mac, Sanctuary: London, foreword by B. B. King, ISBN 1-86074-233-5
- L. Fancourt (1989), British Blues on Record (1957–1970), Retrack Books.
- Dick Heckstall-Smith (1989), The Safest Place in the World: A Personal History of British Rhythm and blues, Quartet Books Limited, ISBN 0-7043-2696-5; Second Edition known as: Blowing The Blues – Fifty Years Playing The British Blues, 2004, Clear Books, ISBN 1-904555-04-7
- Christopher Hjort (2007), Strange Brew: Eric Clapton and the British Blues Boom, 1965-1970, foreword by John Mayall, Jawbone Publishing, ISBN 1-906002-00-2
- Paul Myers (2007), Long John Baldry and the Birth of the British Blues, Vancouver: GreyStone Books, ISBN 1-55365-200-2
- Harry Shapiro (1997), Alexis Korner: The Biography, Bloomsbury Publishing PLC, London, Discography by Mark Troster, ISBN 0-7475-3163-3
- R. F. Schwartz (2007), How Britain got the Blues : The Transmission and Reception of American Blues Style in the United Kingdom Ashgate, ISBN 0-7546-5580-6
- Mike Vernon, The Blue Horizon Story: 1965-1970, Vol. 1, notes of the booklet of the Box Set (60 pages).
