= Chris Dreja =

English musician (1946–2025)

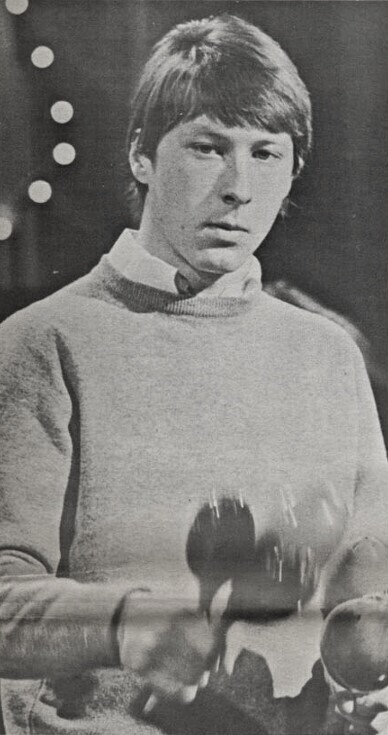
- Dreja with the Yardbirds in 1966

Background information
- Born: Christopher Walenty Dreja; 11 November 1946; Surbiton, Surrey, England
- Died: 25 September 2025 (aged 78) London, England
- Genre: Rock
- Occupation: Guitarist; bassist; photographer
- Years active: 1963–2013
- Formerly of: The Yardbirds; Box of Frogs

Christopher Walenty Dreja (11 November 1946 – 25 September 2025) was an English musician and photographer. He was best known as the rhythm guitarist and bassist for the rock band The Yardbirds. He left the music business in the late 1960s after The Yardbirds folded and became a professional photographer. In 1992, he and the rest of The Yardbirds were inducted into the Rock and Roll Hall of Fame. In later life he would play Yardbirds concerts until a series of strokes forced him to retire from live touring around 2011.

== Early life ==
Christopher Walenty Dreja was born on 11 November 1946 in Surbiton, and raised in Kingston upon Thames, Surrey. His father, Alojzy Dreja (1 January 1918 – 11 December 1985), was from Poland; he had been exiled to Britain in 1940, and served as a pilot in the Polish Air Force in Great Britain during World War II. He married Joyce Guillan in 1943 and they had three sons, Stefan, Christopher and Nicholas. Dreja's elder brother Stefan happened to meet guitarist Top Topham when they studied at the same pre-college art program, and introduced Topham to his brother.

Topham and Dreja were influenced by folk-blues guitarist Gerry Lockran, who influenced them to switch from acoustic to electric guitars according to Greg Russo in his book The Yardbirds: The Ultimate Rave-Up. They made their debut with electric guitars at a concert with Duster Bennett and Jimmy Page. Their other guitar influences included Hubert Sumlin, Duane Eddy, Brian Jones, and Chuck Berry.

== Career ==
=== Music ===
Dreja and Topham became core members of the Metropolitan (or Metropolis) Blues Quartet. During the space of a year Keith Relf, Jim McCarty, and Paul Samwell-Smith joined the group which became the Yardbirds. The 15-year-old Topham left the group when the band went professional, but Dreja continued on to play rhythm guitar with musicians such as Eric Clapton and later Jeff Beck and Jimmy Page.

Dreja changed from rhythm to bass guitar following the departure of the original bassist, Samwell-Smith. Dreja co-authored many Yardbirds group compositions, especially those on the album Yardbirds. Additionally, he drew the picture which would be used as the album cover. Due to this drawing the album has been referred to as Roger the Engineer.

Dreja played in the Yardbirds spin-off band Box of Frogs in the 1980s, and was part of the Yardbirds' reformation from 1992 until 2013, when he retired from the band for medical reasons. In 1992, he along with the rest of The Yardbirds, were inducted into the Rock and Roll Hall of Fame. In 2002, the Yardbirds re-emerged and a new album, Birdland, was released.

=== Photography ===
After the group broke up, Page offered Dreja the position of bassist in a new band he was forming (later to become Led Zeppelin). Dreja declined in order to pursue a profession in photography and the position was filled by John Paul Jones. He photographed Led Zeppelin for the back cover of their debut album. He worked in a photo studio in New York for a few years and at one point did a shooting session with Andy Warhol.

Dreja mentioned that although he possessed quite a unique surname, most people he worked with in New York never realised that he was the same Chris Dreja from the Yardbirds: "I was working in New York in a studio and after two years or so no one had ever at that point equated Chris Dreja of photography with Chris Dreja of the Yardbirds! Some messenger came to the studio and said something like 'Ain't you that Chris Dreja with that Yardbirds band.' It was great in one way." Dreja also photographed artists such as Bob Dylan, the Righteous Brothers and Ike and Tina Turner.

== Personal life and death ==
Dreja lived in London. In the 1960s, he married an American woman, Pat Lally, from New Jersey. After suffering a series of strokes in 2012 and 2013, Dreja retired from The Yardbirds and was replaced by original lead guitarist Top Topham. In a 2014 interview, Jim McCarty updated fans on Chris: "Well, he's OK, he's sort of surviving. He can get around and survive in a quiet way, but he really can't play any more."

Dreja died from complications of a stroke and COPD at a nursing home in London, on 25 September 2025, at the age of 78.

== Equipment ==
During the 1960s Dreja recorded songs on both the electric and bass guitar, including Watkins Rapier, Harmony, a Gibson 335, Les Paul, and Fender Jaguar and Jazzmaster guitars and an Epiphone Rivoli bass. In his later Yardbird years, Dreja continued to use a Les Paul on stage.
