= Tangerine (Led Zeppelin song) =

Song by Led Zeppelin

from the album Led Zeppelin III
- Released: 5 October 1970
- Recorded: May–June 1970 (?); 6 July 1970
- Studio: Rolling Stones Mobile Studio, Headley Grange, Hampshire; Island Studios, London
- Genre: Folk rock; country rock
- Length: 3:12
- Label: Atlantic
- Composer: Jimmy Page
- Lyricists: Jimmy Page; Keith Relf
- Producer: Jimmy Page

"Tangerine" is a folk rock song by the English band Led Zeppelin. Recorded in 1970, it is included on the second, more acoustic-oriented side of Led Zeppelin III (1970). The plaintive ballad reflects on lost love and features strummed acoustic guitar rhythm with pedal steel guitar.

The Yardbirds, with guitarist Jimmy Page, recorded an early version of the song in 1968, titled "Knowing That I'm Losing You". When it was released on the Page-produced 2017 album Yardbirds '68, Keith Relf's vocal was left out. "Tangerine" has been performed in concert by Led Zeppelin at different points in their career and has been recorded by other musicians.

== Background ==
"Tangerine" dates back to Page's time as lead guitarist with the Yardbirds. In April 1968, the group recorded demos for several songs at the Columbia Studios in New York City. (Note: Several writers use a date in May or June 1968 for the recording session, although 4 April 1968, appears in Yardbirds' biographies by Gregg Russo and Alan Clayson.) Page biographer George Case notes that "Knowing That I'm Losing You" is very similar to "Tangerine" and suggests that Jackie DeShannon inspired the tune. Recordings from these sessions (with producer Manny Kellem) and the concert performance later used for Live Yardbirds: Featuring Jimmy Page were rejected for release at the time, but were issued in 2017 on the Yardbirds '68 compilation album produced by Page. While the demo recorded by the Yardbirds featured a vocal by Keith Relf, the 2017 release does not include it.

To develop material for a follow-up album to Led Zeppelin II, Page and singer Robert Plant took a working holiday at Bron-Yr-Aur, a rustic retreat in South Snowdonia, Wales. Plant in particular was inspired by the back-to-the-land trends in northern California and the British folk scene. Accompanied only by acoustic guitar, hand-claps, and harmonica, the pair created tunes that served as the basis for several songs on Led Zeppelin III and later albums. Although written earlier, "Tangerine" reflects this rural sensibility and journalist Nigel Williamson includes it with the acoustic material born of the Bron-Yr-Aur sojourn. Other earlier influences include songs recorded at Mickie Most's Donovan sessions, when John Paul Jones and Page were studio musicians.

== Composition and recording ==
The song begins with a guitar figure, then a pause to set the right tempo. The guitar proceeds with an A minor–G–D guitar progression. Page actually plays two guitar parts – one on a six-string and the other on a twelve-string Giannini Craviola acoustic guitar – which, due to the audio mixing, almost sound as one.

Plant then sings the first verse accompanied by the backing guitar chords:

Measuring a summer's day
I only find it slips away to grey
The hours, they bring me pain

Bassist John Paul Jones complements Page on mandolin.

The second verse contains the chorus, at the beginning of which Jones on bass and drummer John Bonham come in – Jones follows the chord changes and Bonham plays a straightforward backing beat. Through the use of double tracking, Plant provides a harmony vocal line. Page also adds pedal steel guitar fills; however, he departs from the typical American country music approach by adding a wah-wah pedal tonal effect. For the third verse, Plant returns to singing accompanied by guitar chording.

The verses are broken up with an instrumental middle section with Page, Jones, and Bonham. Page solos on a heavily sustained Gibson Les Paul Standard electric guitar, which is also double tracked. Led Zeppelin biographer Dave Lewis calls it "a smooth woman-tone solo" (Note: Eric Clapton used what he called a "woman tone" for several guitar parts in Cream's "I Feel Free" and "Sunshine of Your Love".) After a second chorus, the song winds down with pedal steel fills and ends with an acoustic guitar figure. Led Zeppelin recorded the song at Headley Grange, Headley, East Hampshire, using the Rolling Stones Mobile Studio. The song was engineered and later mixed by Andy Johns at Olympic Studios in London.

== Personnel ==
According to Jean-Michel Guesdon and Philippe Margotin:

- Robert Plant – vocals
- Jimmy Page – acoustic guitars (six-string and twelve-string), lead guitar, pedal steel guitar
- John Paul Jones – bass, mandolin
- John Bonham – drums

== Disagreement over lyrics ==
Although writers do not question who composed the music for the song, (Note: Page/Led Zeppelin biographer Case notes: "The strummed A minor–G–D guitar figure and pedal steel licks are doubtless all Page's invention". Yardbirds' drummer Jim McCarty also believes the music was Page's: "Jimmy must have had that musical idea already – he had those chords. When he did it, I thought it was the strongest song.") there is some disagreement over who wrote the lyrics. In addition to being credited as the songwriter on all Led Zeppelin releases, Page claims to be responsible for the lyrics: "I'd written it after an old emotional upheaval and I just changed a few of the lyrics for the new version". "Tangerine" and "Dazed and Confused" are the only Led Zeppelin songs with lyrics that credit Page as the sole songwriter. (Note: After legal action, the credit for "Dazed and Confused", which the Yardbirds also performed, was changed to "By Page – Inspired by Jake Holmes".)

However, Case, Shadwick, and Williamson identify the Yardbirds' song as a joint or co-composition by Page and Yardbirds' singer and primary lyricist Keith Relf. Yardbirds' drummer Jim McCarty and bassist Chris Dreja both assert that Relf wrote the words for "Knowing That I'm Losing You"; they and Jane Relf (sister and singer who performed with Relf in Renaissance) believe some of his original lines found their way into "Tangerine".

== Release and influence ==
"Tangerine" was issued as an album track on Led Zeppelin III on 5 October 1970 in the US and 23 October 1970 in the UK and quickly went to number one on the album charts. It was included on the LP record's second side, which featured more acoustic- and folk-influenced tunes. Williamson notes that "the song also points the way to the future ... the acoustic guitar intro can easily be seen as an early template for 'Stairway to Heaven'". During Led Zeppelin's 1971–72 tours, they regularly performed the song and recordings appear on several bootleg albums.

== See also ==
- Led Zeppelin bootleg recordings
- List of cover versions of Led Zeppelin songs § Tangerine

== Notes ==
Footnotes

Citations

References

- Guesdon, Jean-Michel; Margotin, Philippe (2018). Led Zeppelin All the Songs: The Story Behind Every Track. Running Press. ISBN 978-0-316-448-67-3.
- Moskowitz, David V. (2015). The 100 Greatest Bands of All Time: A Guide to the Legends Who Rocked the World. ABC-CLIO. ISBN 9781440803406.
- Case, George (2007). Jimmy Page: Magus, Musician, Man – An Unauthorized Biography. New York City: Hal Leonard. ISBN 978-1-4234-0407-1.
- Case, George (2011). Led Zeppelin FAQ: All That's Left to Know About the Greatest Hard Rock Band of All Time. Milwaukee, Wisconsin: Backbeat Books. ISBN 978-1-61713-025-0.
- Clayson, Alan (2002). The Yardbirds. San Francisco: Backbeat Books. ISBN 0-87930-724-2.
- Clayson, Alan (2006). Led Zeppelin: The Origin of the Species: How, Why and Where It All Began (1st. ed.). UK: Chrome Dreams. ISBN 1-84240-345-1.
- Lewis, Dan; Pallett, Simon (2005). Led Zeppelin: The Concert File. London: Omnibus Press. ISBN 1-84449-659-7.
- Lewis, Dave (2012). Led Zeppelin: A Celebration. London: Omnibus Press. ISBN 978-0857128195.
- Power, Martin (2016). No Quarter: The Three Lives of Jimmy Page. London: Omnibus Press. ISBN 978-1783235360.
- Russo, Greg (2016). Yardbirds: The Ultimate Rave-Up. Floral Park, New York: Crossfire Publications. ISBN 978-0-9791845-7-4.
- Shadwick, Keith (2005). Led Zeppelin: The Story of a Band and Their Music 1968–1980 (1st. ed.). San Francisco: Backbeat Books. p. 138. ISBN 978-0-87930-871-1.
- Schiller, David (2019). Guitar: The World's Most Seductive Instrument. New York City: Workman Publishing. ISBN 978-1-5235-0772-6.
- Wall, Mick (2010). When Giants Walked the Earth: A Biography of Led Zeppelin. St. Martin's Griffin. ISBN 978-0-312-59039-0.
- Welch, Chris (1998). Led Zeppelin: Dazed and Confused: The Stories Behind Every Song. New York City: Thunder's Mouth Press. ISBN 1-56025-818-7.
- Williamson, Nigel (2007). The Rough Guide to Led Zeppelin. Rough Guides. ISBN 978-1-84353-841-7.
- Yorke, Ritchie (1993). Led Zeppelin: The Definitive Biography. Underwood-Miller. ISBN 0-88733-177-7.
