= Bron-Y-Aur Stomp =

- Netherlands single picture sleeve, 1970

Song by Led Zeppelin

from the album Led Zeppelin III
- Released: 5 October 1970
- Recorded: 13 December 1969; May–June 1970 (?); 6 July 1970
- Studio: Olympic Sound Studios, Barnes, London; Rolling Stones Mobile Studio, Headley Grange, Hampshire; Island Studios, London
- Genre: Folk rock; country blues; skiffle
- Length: 4:17
- Label: Atlantic
- Songwriters: Jimmy Page; Robert Plant; John Paul Jones
- Producer: Jimmy Page

"Bron-Y-Aur Stomp" is a song recorded by English rock band Led Zeppelin for their third album, Led Zeppelin III, released in 1970.

== Background ==
The title of the song is a misspelling of Bron-Yr-Aur by omission of the 'r' in yr, and takes its name from a house in Gwynedd, Wales, where the members of Led Zeppelin retreated in 1970 to write much of Led Zeppelin III after having completed a concert tour of North America. Bron yr Aur means "hill of gold". Its pronunciation is [ˈbrɔn ər ˈaɪr]. The cottage had no electricity or running water, but the change of scenery provided inspiration for many of the songs on the album, including "Bron-Y-Aur Stomp".

== Composition and recording ==
Jimmy Page and Robert Plant wrote "Bron-Y-Aur Stomp" in 1970. The song was heavily influenced by a number called "Waggoner's Lad" by Bert Jansch, a Scottish folk musician and founding member of the band Pentangle. It is a country music-inflected hoedown, with lyrics about walking in the woods with Plant's blue-eyed Merle dog named Strider. Plant reportedly named his dog after Aragorn (often called Strider) from J. R. R. Tolkien's The Lord of the Rings. However, there are no explicit references to Tolkien works in "Bron-Y-Aur Stomp".

The group recorded the song at Headley Grange in 1970, using the Rolling Stones Mobile Studio. They completed it at Island Studios in London, and Ardent Studios in Memphis, Tennessee. Guitarist Jimmy Page used an acoustic guitar, drummer John Bonham played spoons and castanets, and bassist John Paul Jones played a double bass.

== Personnel ==
According to Jean-Michel Guesdon and Philippe Margotin:

- Robert Plant – vocals
- Jimmy Page – acoustic guitars
- John Paul Jones – double bass
- John Bonham – drums, castanets, spoons
- Unidentified musicians – maracas, hand claps

== Jennings Farm Blues ==
Led Zeppelin also recorded the song as an electric blues rock instrumental, "Jennings Farm Blues", a rough mix of which later surfaced as a studio out-take on a number of Led Zeppelin bootleg recordings. Jennings Farm is the name of the property at Blakeshall on which the Plant family stayed in the early 1970s. "Jennings Farm Blues" was released on 2 June 2014, as part of the remastering process of all nine albums.

== See also ==
- List of cover versions of Led Zeppelin songs
- List of Led Zeppelin songs written or inspired by others

== Bibliography ==
- Guesdon, Jean-Michel; Margotin, Philippe (2018). Led Zeppelin All the Songs: The Story Behind Every Track. Running Press. ISBN 978-0-316-448-67-3.
