= Over the Hills and Far Away (Led Zeppelin song) =

- Netherlands single picture sleeve

Single by Led Zeppelin

from the album Houses of the Holy
- B-side: "Dancing Days"
- Released: 24 May 1973 (US)
- Recorded: 1972
- Studio: Stargroves, East Woodhay, England
- Genre: Folk rock; hard rock; boogie rock; folk metal
- Length: 4:42
- Label: Atlantic
- Songwriters: Jimmy Page; Robert Plant
- Producer: Jimmy Page

Led Zeppelin singles chronology
| "Rock and Roll" (1972) | "Over the Hills and Far Away" (1973) | "D'yer Mak'er" (1973) |

Audio sample
- file; help

"Over the Hills and Far Away" is the third track from English rock band Led Zeppelin's 1973 album Houses of the Holy. In the US, it was released as a single, with "Dancing Days" as the B-side.

== Composition and recording ==
Jimmy Page and Robert Plant wrote the song in 1970 at Bron-Yr-Aur, a small cottage in Wales where they stayed after completing a gruelling North American concert tour. Initially it was titled "Many, Many Times".

Written in the key of G Major, with a tempo of 91 BPM and a 4/4 time signature, Page plays a six-string acoustic guitar introduction and repeats the theme with a 12-string acoustic guitar in unison. This leads into section led by electric guitar with the whole of the band. Following the final verse, the rhythm section fades out, gradually replaced by the echo returns from Page's electric guitar and a few chords played by Jones on clavinet.

== Releases and performances ==
In the US, the song was released as the first single from Houses of the Holy and reached number 51 on the Billboard Hot 100 chart. The group often performed the song in concert, beginning before its album debut.

Archive footage of the song being performed live in Seattle in 1977 and at Knebworth in 1979 was used for an officially distributed video of the song, used to promote the 1990 Led Zeppelin Remasters release. The video accompanied a CD single which was released following the successful "Travelling Riverside Blues" release.

== Reception ==
Cash Box said the song "is a bit deceiving" in that "what opens as an acoustic song soon turns into an amazingly powerful Led Zeppelin classic complete with rock melody."

In a contemporary review for Houses of the Holy, Gordon Fletcher of Rolling Stone criticized "Over the Hills and Far Away", calling the track dull, as well as writing the track is "cut from the same mold as "Stairway to Heaven", but becomes dull without that song's torrid guitar solo".

The song has received greater acclaim in more recent years. Rolling Stone ranked "Over the Hills and Far Away" at No. 16 in its list of "The 40 Greatest Led Zeppelin Songs of All Time" in 2012. Andrew Unterberger of Spin, in 2014, ranked "Over the Hills and Far Away" as Led Zeppelin's best song, writing that it "best demonstrates just about everything the band does well: the unforgettable and impossible-to-pin-down opening riff, the life-affirming transition from acoustic to electric, the constant switches in tone and dynamic, the piercing solo with double-tracked climax, the impeccable interplay of guitar, bass, and drum, the inimitable Plant shrieking, the gorgeous coda, even the super-oblique title". Critic Bill Wyman, writing for Vulture in 2015, ranked it as Led Zeppelin's sixth best song.

== Charts ==
1973 singles charts
| Chart | Peak | Ref(s) |
|---|---|---|
| Canada RPM 100 | 63 | |
| US Billboard Hot 100 | 51 | |
| US Cash Box Top Singles | 28 | |
| US Record World 100 Top Pop | 31 | |

2007 digital song charts (download)
| Chart | Peak | Ref(s) |
|---|---|---|
| US Billboard Hot Digital Songs | 63 | |

== Personnel ==
According to Jean-Michel Guesdon and Philippe Margotin:

- Robert Plant – vocals
- Jimmy Page – acoustic guitars (six- and twelve-string), electric guitars
- John Paul Jones – bass, keyboards
- John Bonham – drums

== See also ==
- List of cover versions of Led Zeppelin songs – "Over the Hills and Far Away" entries
- Over the Hills and Far Away (traditional song)

== Bibliography ==
- Guesdon, Jean-Michel; Margotin, Philippe (2018). Led Zeppelin All the Songs: The Story Behind Every Track. Running Press. ISBN 978-0-316-448-67-3.
