= That's the Way (Led Zeppelin song) =

Song by Led Zeppelin

from the album Led Zeppelin III
- Released: 5 October 1970
- Recorded: May–June 1970 (?); 30 May 1970
- Studio: Rolling Stones Mobile Studio, Headley Grange, Hampshire; Olympic Sound Studios, London
- Genre: Folk rock
- Length: 5:37
- Label: Atlantic
- Songwriters: Jimmy Page, Robert Plant
- Producer: Jimmy Page

"That's the Way" is a folk rock ballad by the English rock band Led Zeppelin from their third album, Led Zeppelin III, released in 1970. As with several of the tracks on the album, it is an acoustic song.

== Composition ==
Jimmy Page and Robert Plant wrote the piece in 1970 on a retreat at Bron-Yr-Aur cottage, Wales. Page noted that the two developed it and recorded a rough demo after a long walk before they returned to the cottage.

The original working title of the song was "The Boy Next Door". On the surface, the lyrics are about one boy's parents being against his friendship with another boy due to his long hair and coming from the wrong side of town. It also reflects on the group's early American tours, when they were sometimes harassed for their appearance.

Instrumentation for the song is sparse, consisting of a strummed twelve-string acoustic guitar, with overdubbed mandolin and steel guitar fills; percussion and bass are absent from much of the song until the instrumental outro. According to Page, "And right at the end, where everything opens up, I played a dulcimer." He also plays the bass heard at the conclusion: "I was doing a bunch of overdubs and got excited. [Bassist] John Paul Jones went home, so I put the bass part on it as well! [laughs] That didn't happen often, believe me!"

== Personnel ==
According to Jean-Michel Guesdon and Philippe Margotin (except for pedal steel):

- Robert Plant – vocals
- Jimmy Page – acoustic guitars, pedal steel guitar, dulcimer, bass, vocal harmonies (?)
- John Paul Jones – mandolin, vocal harmonies (?)
- John Bonham – tambourine

== Reception ==
In a contemporary review of Led Zeppelin III, Lester Bangs of Rolling Stone describes "That's the Way" as the first Led Zeppelin song that has ever truly moved him. Bangs praises the understated, but effective acoustic guitar and vocal approach. In a later review for AllMusic, Denise Sullivan calls it "one of Led Zeppelin's most beautiful ballads (in the true tradition of the folk ballad)".

== See also ==
- List of cover versions of Led Zeppelin songs § That's the Way

== Sources ==
- Guesdon, Jean-Michel; Margotin, Philippe (2018). Led Zeppelin All the Songs: The Story Behind Every Track. Running Press. ISBN 978-0-316-448-67-3.
- Lewis, Dave (1994). The Complete Guide to the Music of Led Zeppelin. London: Omnibus Press. ISBN 0-7119-3528-9.
- Welch, Chris (1994). Led Zeppelin. London: Orion Books. ISBN 1-85797-930-3.
