= Houses of the Holy =

Studio album by Led Zeppelin
- Released: 28 March 1973
- Recorded: December 1971 – August 1972
- Studios: Rolling Stones Mobile (Stargroves and Headley Grange); Island and Olympic (London)
- Genres: Hard rock; art rock
- Length: 40:57
- Label: Atlantic
- Producer: Jimmy Page

Led Zeppelin chronology
Untitled (1971)	Houses of the Holy (1973)	Physical Graffiti (1975)

Singles from Houses of the Holy
- 1. "Over the Hills and Far Away" / "Dancing Days" Released: 24 May 1973; 2. "D'yer Mak'er" / "The Crunge" Released: 17 September 1973

Houses of the Holy is the fifth studio album by the English rock band Led Zeppelin, released on 28 March 1973 in the United States and on 30 March 1973 in the United Kingdom by Atlantic Records. The album benefited from two band members installing studios at home, which allowed them to develop more sophisticated songs and arrangements and expand their musical style. Several songs subsequently became fixtures in the group's live set, including "The Song Remains the Same", "The Rain Song" and "No Quarter". Other material recorded at the sessions, including the title track, was shelved and released on the later albums Physical Graffiti (1975) and Coda (1982). All instruments and vocals were provided by the band members Robert Plant (vocals), Jimmy Page (guitar), John Paul Jones (bass, keyboards), and John Bonham (drums). The album was produced by Page and mixed by Eddie Kramer. The cover was the first for the band to be designed by Hipgnosis and was based on a photograph taken at Giant's Causeway in Northern Ireland.

Although critical response was mixed, Houses of the Holy became a commercial success, later receiving a Diamond certification by the Recording Industry Association of America (RIAA) in 1999 for at least 10 million copies sold in the US. In 2020, the album was ranked at number 278 on Rolling Stone's 2020 list of the "500 Greatest Albums of All Time".

== Recording ==
By 1972, Led Zeppelin had achieved sustained commercial and critical success from both their studio albums and live shows. They were keen to record on location using the Rolling Stones Mobile Studio as it had been an enjoyable experience for their untitled fourth album, released the previous year. After touring Australia, in April 1972 the group decided to take the mobile studio to Mick Jagger's home, Stargroves, a manor house and country estate in Hampshire. Eddie Kramer returned as recording engineer.

Some songs from the album had initially been tried out in earlier sessions, such as "No Quarter", which was first attempted during a session at Headley Grange Estate, in East Hampshire. Both guitarist and producer Jimmy Page and bassist and keyboardist John Paul Jones had installed home studios, which allowed them to arrive at Stargroves with complete compositions and arrangements.

Page's home studio used some of the equipment from Pye Mobile Studios, which had been used to record the Who's 1970 live album Live at Leeds. Because of his home studio, he was able to present a complete arrangement of "The Rain Song", including non-standard guitar tunings and a variety of dynamics, and "Over the Hills and Far Away", featuring multiple guitar parts. Meanwhile, Jones had developed a new arrangement of "No Quarter". Once the group were settled in Stargroves, they composed the other songs through jam sessions together. Further recording took place at Olympic Studios in May, and during the band's 1972 North American tour additional recording sessions were conducted at Electric Lady Studios in New York. Some songs recorded during these various sessions did not make it onto Houses of the Holy, though several were released on later albums. A series of rock 'n' roll covers, including songs that appeared on Elvis Presley's Elvis' Golden Records, were recorded at Electric Lady Studios, which remain unreleased.

== Composition ==
The album was a stylistic turning point for the band. The composition and production laid foundations for subsequent releases. According to the band's biographer Dave Lewis, "while the barnstorming effect of the early era was now levelling off, and though devoid of the electricity of Zeppelin I and II, the sheer diversity of the third album, and lacking the classic status of the fourth, Houses of the Holy nevertheless found its rightful niche." The album largely abandoned their previous music's weighty, dark blues rock distortion in favor of a clean, expansive rock sound—as evinced by Page's sharper, brighter guitar tone. It was also likely the most eclectic musically of their albums, in the opinion of Consequence of Sound writer Kristofer Lenz, who observed swing rhythms on "Dancing Days", and experiments with reggae and psychedelic music on "D'yer Mak'er" and "No Quarter", respectively. Pete Prown and HP Newquist have called it "a diverse collection of rockers, ballads, reggae, funk, and fifties-style rock 'n' roll".

=== Side one ===
The album's opening track, "The Song Remains The Same", was originally a Page-composed instrumental called "The Overture". Plant added lyrics that referred to the group's experiences on tour, and it was given a working title of "The Campaign". His lead vocal was sped up slightly in the final mix, while Page played an electric twelve string guitar and a six-string electric. For live performances, he used the Gibson EDS-1275 double-neck guitar that was also used for playing "Stairway to Heaven" in concert.

"The Rain Song" was composed at Page's home studio, including the entire arrangement and the vocal melody. He was inspired to write the song after George Harrison complained that Led Zeppelin "never did any ballads". The opening chords are the same as Harrison's song "Something" from the Beatles' Abbey Road. The backing track was recorded at Olympic, with a working title of "Slush". Plant added some sensitive lyrics which matched the music, Jones added a string section played on the Mellotron, while Page played acoustic and Danelectro electric guitars in various different tunings. The song was regularly performed live, with Page using the Gibson EDS-1275. Page and Plant revived the track for their 1994–95 tour.

"Over the Hills and Far Away" was written about the hippie lifestyle, including references to the "open road". The song was developed in two halves, with a quiet acoustic section leading into a livelier electric one. The song was one of the first to be introduced into Led Zeppelin's live set, being first played in mid-1972.

"The Crunge" was written by Bonham and developed out of a jam at Stargroves. He decided to create a funk beat that stepped on and off the beat, making it impossible to dance to. Plant improvised a set of lyrics in the manner of James Brown over the music, parodying Brown's "Take it to the Bridge" vocal style towards the end of the track. To further show that the song was a tongue-in-cheek joke, the group considered putting "dance steps" to the song on the cover at one stage. The track was occasionally performed as an impromptu piece in concert, usually in the middle of another song such as the fast guitar solo section in "Dazed and Confused".

=== Side two ===
"Dancing Days" was inspired by the enjoyable sessions at Stargroves, and the lyrics show a general optimism to life. Kramer recalled the group dancing around in the garden at Stargroves, listening to the playback of the final mix. A promotional copy of the track was sent out by Atlantic for radio play in March 1973, as a preview for the album.

"D'yer Mak'er" (Note: The title comes from an old British joke – "My wife's gone on holiday?" "D'Yer Mak'er?" (which when pronounced quickly sounds like "Jamaica") "No, she went of her own accord.") originated with Bonham trying to combine reggae with 1950s doo-wop (Note: This led to the remark "Whatever happened to Rosie and the Originals?" on the sleeve) by leaving a short off-beat. Jones later disapproved of the track, saying it was treated as a joke and not thought out well, but Plant thought it could be a hit and suggested it should be released as a single. Led Zeppelin's general policy was to not release singles in the UK, and though test and promotional pressings were produced there, the rest of the group vetoed the idea. In the United States, it became a top 20 hit.

"No Quarter" was composed by Jones. An early arrangement of the song was attempted for their fourth album, but abandoned. Jones reworked the track to add acoustic and electric piano, and various synthesizers. The track quickly became a live favourite, and was featured at every show from 1973 through 1979, providing Jones with an extended solo showcase in the middle, and a jam session with a variety of different styles. Plant revived the song for his 1990 tour, and it was performed by Page and Plant in 1994. Jones performed a solo instrumental performance on tour in 1999, and Plant performed it solo again in 2005. It was part of the set at the Ahmet Ertegun Tribute Concert in 2007.

"The Ocean" began with Bonham shouting "We've done four already but now we're steady and then they went, one, two, three, four," referring to the number of takes already recorded. The title and lyrics refer to the group's fans and their devotion to the band. The middle of the track features an a cappella vocal break sung by Plant, Bonham and Jones, while the ending was another pastiche of the doo-wop style.

=== Unreleased material ===
The album's title track was recorded at Olympic and mixed at Electric Lady. It was ultimately left off the album, as there were enough tracks to fill two sides of an LP, and was released on the follow-up, Physical Graffiti, in 1975. That album also included two other songs from Houses of the Holy's Stargroves sessions, "The Rover" and "Black Country Woman" (the latter recorded in the outdoor garden).

Another track from the Stargroves sessions, "Walter's Walk", was eventually released on Coda in 1982.

== Packaging ==
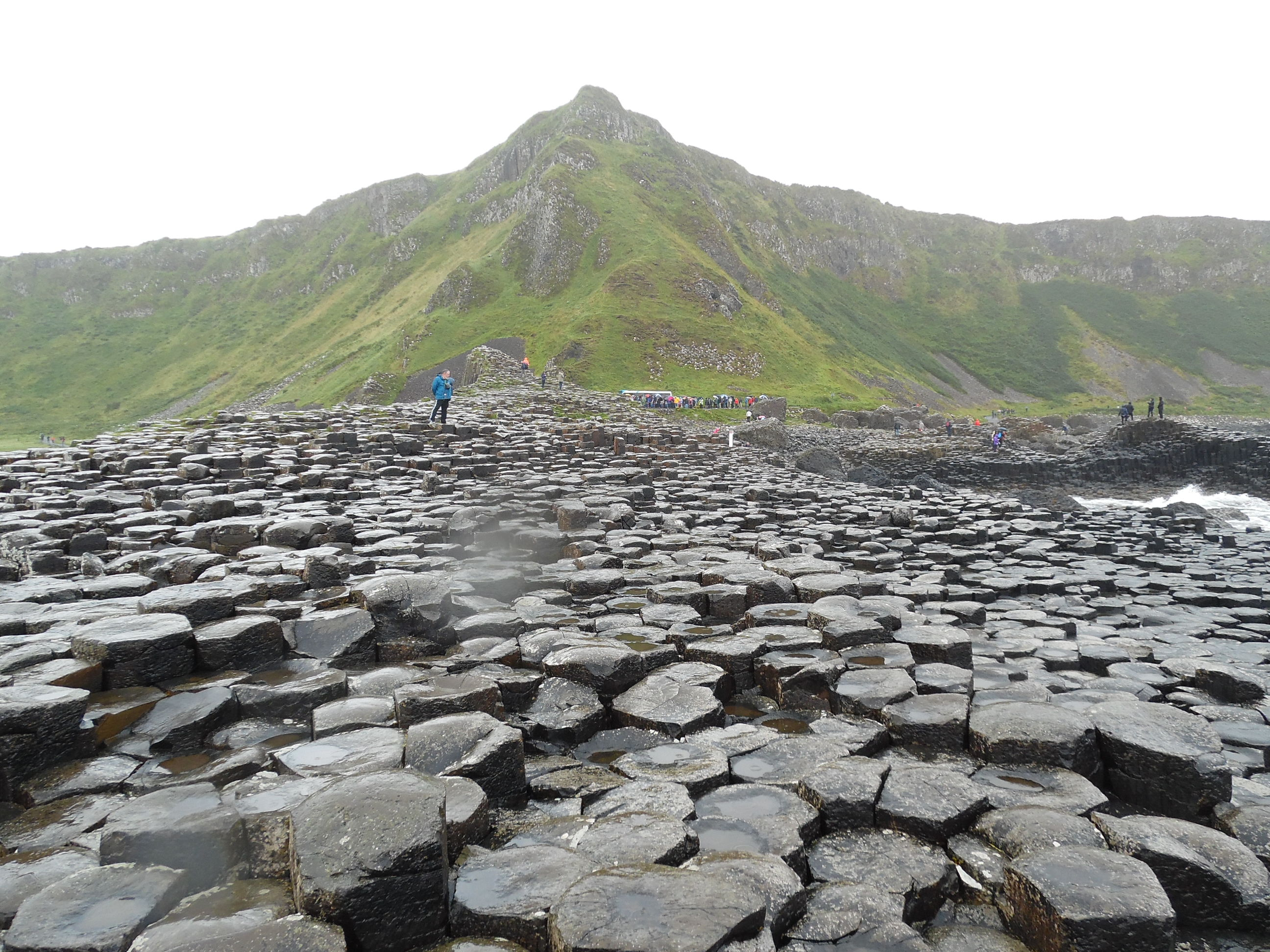
The cover photograph was shot at the Giant's Causeway, Northern Ireland

Houses of the Holy was the first album by the group to have an explicit title that was not eponymous, but like the previous one, neither the band's name nor the album title was printed on the sleeve. However, manager Peter Grant did allow Atlantic Records to add a wrap-around paper title band to US copies of the sleeve that had to be broken or slid off to access the record. The first CD release of the album in the 1980s had the title logos printed on the cover itself.

The cover art for Houses of the Holy was inspired by Arthur C. Clarke's novel Childhood's End (1953). The cover is a collage of several photographs which were taken at the Giant's Causeway, Northern Ireland, by Aubrey Powell of Hipgnosis. This location was chosen ahead of an alternative one in Peru which had also been considered.

The photo shoot featured two naked child models, Stefan and Samantha Gates, aged five and seven. It was a frustrating affair over the course of 10 days. Shooting was done first thing in the morning and at sunset in order to capture the light at dawn and dusk, but the desired effect was never achieved due to constant rain and clouds. The photos of the two children were taken in black and white and were multi-printed to create the effect of 11 individuals that can be seen on the album cover (six on the front, five on the back). The results were unsatisfactory, but some accidental tinting effects in post-production created a suitable cover. The inner gatefold photograph was taken at Dunluce Castle nearby the Causeway. In February 2010, Stefan Gates was featured on a BBC Radio 4 documentary about the cover. He said there was something sinister about the image, though his sister disagreed. He also admitted to never having heard the album. The programme ended with Gates returning to Giant's Causeway and listening to the album on a portable player, after which he said that a great weight had been lifted from him. Samantha also appeared on the back cover of the band's 1976 album Presence.

Page has stated that the album cover was the second version submitted by Hipgnosis. The first, by artist Storm Thorgerson, featured an electric green tennis court with a tennis racket on it. Furious that Thorgerson was implying, by means of a visual pun, that their music sounded like a "racket", the band fired him and hired Powell in his place.

In 1974, the album was nominated for a Grammy Award in the category of Best Album Package. The cover was rated number 6 on VH1's 50 Greatest Album Covers in 2003.

== Release and reception ==
Retrospective professional reviews
Review scores
Source	Rating
AllMusic	5/5 stars
Christgau's Record Guide	A−
Encyclopedia of Popular Music	4/5 stars
Entertainment Weekly	A
The Great Rock Discography	8/10
MusicHound Rock	4/5
Pitchfork	9.3/10
Rolling Stone	5/5 stars
The Rolling Stone Album Guide	4.5/5 stars
Tom Hull – on the Web	A−

This was Led Zeppelin's final studio release on Atlantic Records before forming their own label, Swan Song Records, in 1974, which would be distributed by Atlantic. It was also the only Led Zeppelin album that contained complete printed lyrics for each song.

"The epic scale suited Zeppelin: They had the largest crowds, the loudest rock songs, the most groupies, the fullest manes of hair. Eventually excess would turn into bombast, but on Houses, it still provided inspiration."

— Gavin Edwards, Rolling Stone (2003)

Although intended for release in January 1973, delays in producing the album cover meant that it was not released until March, when the band was on its 1973 European tour. The album was promoted heavily before the commencement of Led Zeppelin's subsequent North American Tour, ensuring that it had ascended the top of the American chart by the beginning of the tour. Because much of the album had been recorded almost a year previously, many of the songs which are featured on the album had already been played live by Led Zeppelin on their concert tours of North America, Japan, Europe and the UK in 1972–73.

Houses of the Holy originally received mixed reviews, with much criticism from the music press being directed at the off-beat nature of tracks such as "The Crunge" and "D'yer Mak'er". Gordon Fletcher from Rolling Stone called the album "one of the dullest and most confusing albums I've heard this year", believing the band had digressed from "the epitome of everything good about rock" to a watered-down heavy metal act. However, the album was a commercial success and topped the UK charts and spent 39 weeks on the Billboard 200 albums chart including two weeks at number one (their longest stint since Led Zeppelin III). The album was number four on Billboard magazine's top albums of 1973 year end chart.

In Christgau's Record Guide: Rock Albums of the Seventies (1981), Robert Christgau appraised Houses of the Holy favourably. While mocking the solemnity of "No Quarter" and finding some tracks derivative of previous albums, he found side one "solid led" with "sprung rhythm" and a "James Brown tribute/parody/ripoff" in "The Crunge" that complements the second side's "two amazing, well, dance tracks" in "Dancing Days"'s "transmogrified shuffle" and the reggae of "D'yer Mak'er". "Throughout the record, the band's playing is excellent," wrote AllMusic's Stephen Thomas Erlewine, "making the eclecticism of Page and Robert Plant's songwriting sound coherent and natural."

In 2003, Rolling Stone ranked it at number 149 on the magazine's list of the "500 Greatest Albums of All Time." It was re-ranked at number 148 in a 2012 revised list, and re-ranked at number 278 in 2020. In 1991, Chuck Eddy ranked Houses of the Holy 45th in his book of the 500 best heavy metal albums, writing that as with "the Byrds in the sixties and college radio in the eighties", the band "forfeit hookage for janglage". He noted that despite fans of the band's "lead mode" being critical of the funk and reggae excursions, "fun" songs like those and "Dancing Days" mark the album's best material, highlighting Bonham's great steel drum-esque sounds on "D'yer Maker", as well as praising "The Rain Song" for being "my kinda new age".

Accolades for Houses of the Holy
Publication	Country	Accolade	Year	Rank
The Book of Rock Lists	United States	"The Top 40 Albums (1973)"	1981	13
Grammy Award	United States	"Grammy Award for Best Recording Package"	1974	Nominee
Classic Rock	United Kingdom	"100 Greatest British Rock Album Ever"	2006	90
Rock and Roll Hall of Fame	United States	"The Definitive 200: Top 200 Albums of All-Time"	2007	51
Rolling Stone	United States	"The 500 Greatest Albums of All Time"	2020	278
Pitchfork Media	United States	"Top 100 Albums of the 1970s"	2004	75

(*) designates unordered lists.

== 2014 reissue ==
2014 reissue ratings
Aggregate scores
Source	Rating
Metacritic	98/100
Review scores
Source	Rating
Classic Rock	9/10
Consequence of Sound	A−
Mojo	4/5 stars
Pitchfork	9.3/10
Q	5/5 stars
Rolling Stone	4.5/5 stars

A remastered version of Houses of the Holy was reissued on 27 October 2014, along with Led Zeppelin IV. The reissue comes in six formats: a standard CD edition, a deluxe two-CD edition, a standard LP version, a deluxe two-LP version, a super deluxe two-CD plus two-LP version with a hardback book, and as high resolution 24-bit/96k digital downloads. The deluxe and super deluxe editions feature bonus material. The reissue was released with an altered-colour version of the original album's artwork as its bonus disc's cover.

At Metacritic, which assigns a normalised rating out of 100 to reviews from mainstream publications, the reissue received an average score of 98, based on nine reviews, indicating "universal acclaim". Consequence of Sound writer Kristofer Lenz said, "The remastering of this album is a blessing to the careful compositions and mannered performances throughout the record." "Houses of the Holy might be Zeppelin's most impressive album on a purely sonic level," wrote Pitchfork's Mark Richardson, "and this particular remaster reinforces that notion." He was disappointed, however, by the bonus disc of alternate mixes, which merely provide "a chance to hear familiar performances in familiar songs in a way that sounds slightly unfamiliar".

== Track listing ==
All tracks written by Jimmy Page and Robert Plant, except where noted.

=== Original release ===
Side one
No.	Title	Writer(s)	Date and Location	Length
1.	"The Song Remains the Same"		May 1972, Stargroves	5:32
2.	"The Rain Song"		May 1972, Stargroves	7:39
3.	"Over the Hills and Far Away"		May 1972, Stargroves	4:50
4.	"The Crunge"	Page; Plant; John Paul Jones; John Bonham	April 1972, Headley Grange	3:17
Total length:				21:18

Side two
No.	Title	Writer(s)	Date and Location	Length
1.	"Dancing Days"		May 1972, Stargroves	3:43
2.	"D'yer Mak'er"	Page; Plant; Jones; Bonham	May 1972, Stargroves	4:23
3.	"No Quarter"	Jones; Page; Plant	December 1971, Island Studios	7:00
4.	"The Ocean"	Page; Plant; Jones; Bonham	May 1972, Stargroves	4:31
Total length:				19:37 40:55

=== Deluxe edition (2014) ===
2014 deluxe edition bonus disc
No.	Title	Writer(s)	Recording Date	Length
1.	"The Song Remains the Same" (Guitar overdub reference mix)		18 May 1972	5:29
2.	"The Rain Song" (Mix minus piano)		18 May 1972	7:45
3.	"Over the Hills and Far Away" (Guitar mix backing track)		16 April 1972	4:22
4.	"The Crunge" (Rough mix – Keys up)	Page; Plant; Jones; Bonham	16 April 1972	3:16
5.	"Dancing Days" (Rough mix with vocal)		12 April 1972	3:46
6.	"No Quarter" (Rough mix with John Paul Jones keyboard overdubs – No vocal)	Page; Plant; Jones	3 December 1971	7:03
7.	"The Ocean" (Working mix)	Page; Plant; Jones; Bonham	15 April 1972	4:26
Total length:				36:10

== Personnel ==
Personnel taken from Houses of the Holy sleeve notes.

Led Zeppelin

- Robert Plant – vocals
- Jimmy Page – guitars; production
- John Paul Jones – bass guitar (tracks 1–6, 8), Mellotron (track 2), Piano (tracks 2, 6, 7), organ (track 5), synthesizers (tracks 4, 7), bass synth, electric piano (track 7), backing vocals (track 8)
- John Bonham – drums; backing vocals (track 8)

Production

- Eddie Kramer – engineering, mixing
- George Chkiantz – engineering
- Keith Harwood – engineering
- George Marino – mastering (remastered CD)

Design and cover

- Hipgnosis – sleeve design
- Aubrey Powell – cover photography

== Charts ==
=== Weekly charts ===
1973–1974 weekly chart performance for Houses of the Holy
Chart (1973–1974)	Peak position
Australian Albums (Kent Music Report)	1
Austrian Albums (Ö3 Austria)	3
Canada Top Albums/CDs (RPM)	1
Danish Albums (Hitlisten)	24
Dutch Albums (Album Top 100)	3
Finnish Albums (The Official Finnish Charts)	2
German Albums (Offizielle Top 100)	8
Italian Albums (Musica e Dischi)	4
Japanese Albums (Oricon)	3
Norwegian Albums (VG-lista)	4
Spanish Albums Chart	9
UK Albums (Official Charts)	1
US Billboard 200	1
US Top 100 Albums (Cash Box)	1

2014 weekly chart performance for Houses of the Holy
Chart (2014)	Peak position
Australian Albums (ARIA)	33
Belgian Albums (Ultratop Flanders)	37
Belgian Albums (Ultratop Wallonia)	20
Danish Albums (Hitlisten)	24
Finnish Albums (Suomen virallinen lista)	11
French Albums (SNEP)	29
Hungarian Albums (MAHASZ)	12
Italian Albums (FIMI)	17
New Zealand Albums (RMNZ)	9
Portuguese Albums (AFP)	12
Scottish Albums (Official Charts)	16
Swedish Albums (Sverigetopplistan)	15
Swiss Albums (Schweizer Hitparade)	20
UK Rock & Metal Albums (Official Charts)	3

2024 weekly chart performance for Houses of the Holy
Chart (2024)	Peak position
Greek Albums (IFPI)	3

=== Year-end charts ===
Year-end chart performance for Houses of the Holy
Chart (1973)	Position
US Top 100 Albums (Cash Box)	2
West German Albums Chart	16

== Certifications ==
Certifications for Houses of the Holy
Region	Certification	Certified units/sales
Argentina (CAPIF)	Gold	30,000^{^}
Australia (ARIA)	2× Platinum	140,000^{^}
France (SNEP)	2× Gold	200,000^{*}
Germany (BVMI)	Gold	250,000^{^}
Italy (FIMI)	Gold	25,000^{‡}
Spain (Promusicae)	Gold	50,000^{^}
United Kingdom (BPI)	Platinum	300,000^{^}
United States (RIAA)	11× Platinum	11,000,000^{^}
^{*} Sales figures based on certification alone.^{^} Shipments figures based on certification alone.^{‡} Sales+streaming figures based on certification alone.

== See also ==
- List of best-selling albums in the United States
- List of Billboard 200 number-one albums of 1973
- List of UK Albums Chart number ones of 1973
