= Bron-Yr-Aur =

Stone cottage near Machynlleth in Wales

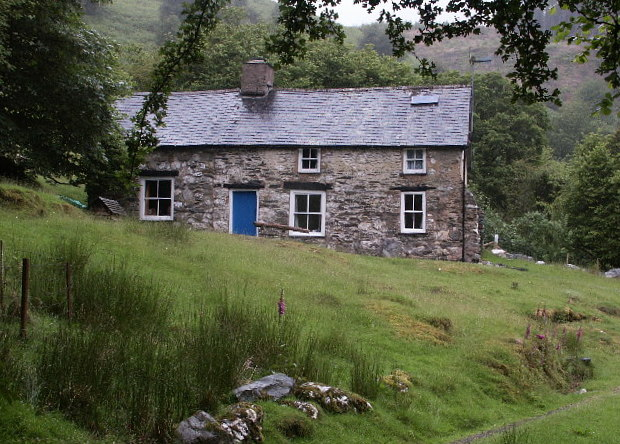
Bron-Yr-Aur in June 2004

Bron-Yr-Aur (Welsh for 'hill of gold'; Welsh pronunciation: [brɔn ər ˈai̯r]) is a privately owned 18th-century cottage in Gwynedd, mid-Wales, on the outskirts of Machynlleth, best known for its association with the English rock band Led Zeppelin. In 1970, Jimmy Page and Robert Plant went there and wrote many of the songs that appeared on the band's third and fourth studio albums. The cottage overlooks the Dyfi Valley.

== Overview ==
During the 1950s, the cottage was used as a holiday home by the family of future Led Zeppelin vocalist Robert Plant. In 1970, Plant and guitarist Jimmy Page spent time there after a long and gruelling concert tour of North America. Though the cottage had no running water or electricity, they used it as a retreat to write and record some of their third album, Led Zeppelin III. Also in retreat at the cottage were Plant's wife Maureen and their 18-month-old daughter Carmen, Page's girlfriend Charlotte Martin, and Led Zeppelin roadies Clive Coulson and Sandy MacGregor.

Page explained:

Robert [Plant] and I went to Bron-Yr-Aur in 1970. We'd been working solidly right up to that point. Even recordings were done on the road. We had this time off and Robert suggested the cottage. I certainly hadn't been to that area of Wales. So we took our guitars down there and played a few bits and pieces. This wonderful countryside, panoramic views and having the guitars ... it was just an automatic thing to be playing. And we started writing.

According to the guitarist, the time spent at Bron-Yr-Aur in 1970

...was the first time I really came to know Robert [Plant]. Actually living together at Bron-Yr-Aur, as opposed to occupying nearby hotel rooms. The songs took us into areas that changed the band, and it established a standard of travelling for inspiration... which is the best thing a musician can do.

Led Zeppelin songs that can be traced to Plant and Page's time at Bron-Yr-Aur in 1970 include "Over the Hills and Far Away" and "The Crunge" (both from Houses of the Holy), "The Rover", "Bron-Yr-Aur" and "Down by the Seaside" (from Physical Graffiti), "Poor Tom" (released on Coda) and three they actually used on Led Zeppelin III: "Friends", "Bron-Y-Aur Stomp" and "That's the Way". There were also two songs recorded, called "Another Way To Wales" and "I Wanna Be Her Man", which were never officially released. A primitive recording of the latter song can be heard on bootleg label Antrabata's studio outtake sessions.

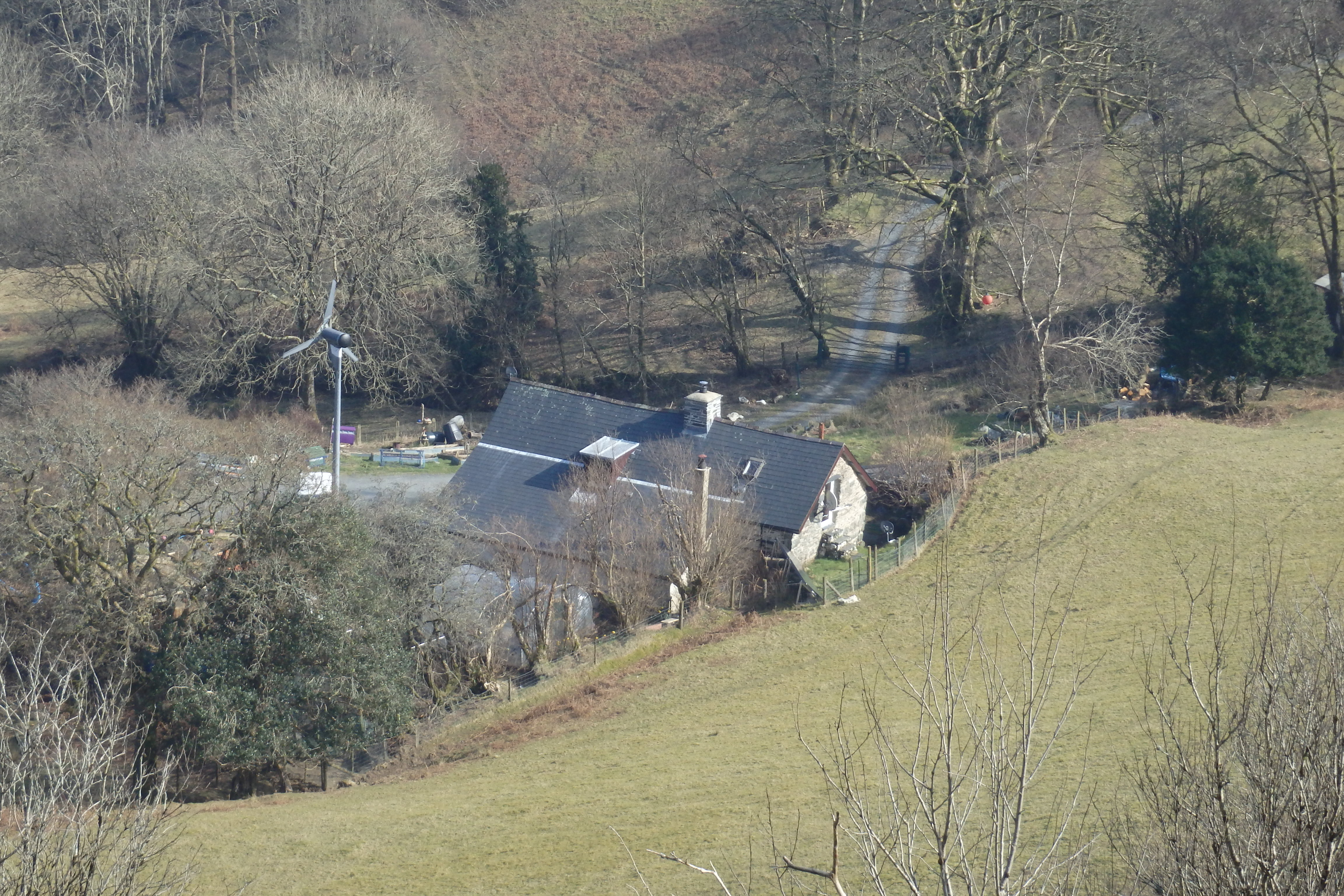
View from hillside of Bron-Yr-Aur in 2016

When on stage at Page and Plant's Unledded reunion in 1994, Plant announced that Page's daughter, Scarlet Page, was conceived "about half an hour" after "That's the Way" was written at Bron-Yr-Aur.

Led Zeppelin used the name of the house in the title of two songs. "Bron-Y-Aur Stomp" (the house's name was accidentally misspelled on the album cover) is a country music-inflected hoedown on Led Zeppelin III, in which Robert Plant sings about walking in the woods with Strider, his blue-eyed merle dog. An earlier, fully electric instrumental version of this song, "Jennings Farm Blues", was recorded at Olympic Studios in 1969 and included on a bootleg album of studio outtakes, Studio Gems. "Bron-Yr-Aur", by contrast, is an instrumental played by Page on six-string acoustic guitar. It appeared on the later album Physical Graffiti, and in the films Almost Famous and The Song Remains the Same.

On 16 June 2016, Page testified under oath, due to the legal proceedings regarding the rights to the song, that he wrote the acoustic guitar intro to "Stairway to Heaven" at Headley Grange, and not at Bron-Yr-Aur.
