= Zacron =

English artist (1943–2012)

Zacron, born Richard Drew (1943 - January 2012) was an English artist who designed the Led Zeppelin III album cover.

== Biography ==
Zacron was born in Sutton, Surrey in 1943. He studied painting, drawing, design and etching at Studio 35 in Surbiton from 1957-1960 with Eric Clapton, and later at Kingston College of Art where he met Jimmy Page. He lectured at Leeds College of Art from 1967-1970. He taught at Acton County School. He also taught for a short while at Elliott Comprehensive in Putney.

Zacron's innovation in graphic techniques laid the foundation for his creation of the Led Zeppelin III album cover in 1970. This album cover is a small component of a vast and varied body of work spanning five decades, with much of his work having a close association to rock and roll. He also designed the sleeve for Fancy's 1975 album Something To Remember.

Zacron has been described as "multi-sided and multi-talented" with "a robust ethos of independence and bravery, a lifelong quest for knowledge". He was a public advocate of artistic freedom and a notable financial contributor to the Great Ormond Street Hospital in London for terminally ill children, organised by Light and Sound at Abbey Road Studios.

He died in January 2012 from bowel cancer, but his death was not revealed publicly until August that year.
