= Led Zeppelin III =

Studio album by Led Zeppelin
- Released: 5 October 1970
- Recorded: November 1969 – August 1970
- Studios: Rolling Stones Mobile; Headley Grange (Hampshire); Island and Olympic (London)
- Genres: Hard rock; folk rock; psychedelic folk
- Length: 43:04
- Label: Atlantic
- Producer: Jimmy Page

Led Zeppelin chronology
Led Zeppelin II (1969)	Led Zeppelin III (1970)	Untitled (1971)

Singles from Led Zeppelin III
- 1. "Immigrant Song" Released: 5 November 1970

Led Zeppelin III is the third studio album by the English rock band Led Zeppelin, released on 5 October 1970. It was recorded in three locations. Much of the work was done at Headley Grange, a country house, using the Rolling Stones Mobile Studio. Additional sessions were held at Island Studios and Olympic Studios in London. As with the prior album, the band eschewed the use of guest musicians, with all music performed by band members Robert Plant (vocals), Jimmy Page (guitars), John Paul Jones (bass, keyboards), and John Bonham (drums). The range of instruments played by the band was greatly enhanced on this album, with Jones especially emerging as a multi-instrumentalist, playing a wide range of keyboard and stringed instruments, including various synthesizers, mandolin and double bass, in addition to his usual bass guitar. As with prior albums, Page served as producer on the album, with mixing done by Andy Johns and Terry Manning.

The album showed a progression from straightforward rock towards folk and acoustic music. While hard rock influences were still present, such as on "Immigrant Song", acoustic-based songs such as "Gallows Pole" and "That's the Way" showed Led Zeppelin were capable of playing different styles successfully. The band wrote most of the material themselves, but as with prior records, included two songs that were re-interpretations of earlier works: "Gallows Pole", based on a traditional English folk song, by way of American singer Fred Gerlach; and "Hats Off to (Roy) Harper", a reworking of a blues song by Bukka White. The acoustic material developed from a songwriting session between Plant and Page at Bron-Yr-Aur cottage in Wales, which influenced the musical direction.

The album was one of the most anticipated of 1970, and its shipping date was held up by the intricate inner sleeve design based around a volvelle, with numerous images visible through holes in the outer cover. It was an immediate commercial success upon release and topped the UK and US charts. Although many critics were initially confused over the change in musical style and gave the album a mixed response, Led Zeppelin III has since been acknowledged as representing an important milestone in the band's history and a turning point in their music.

== Background ==
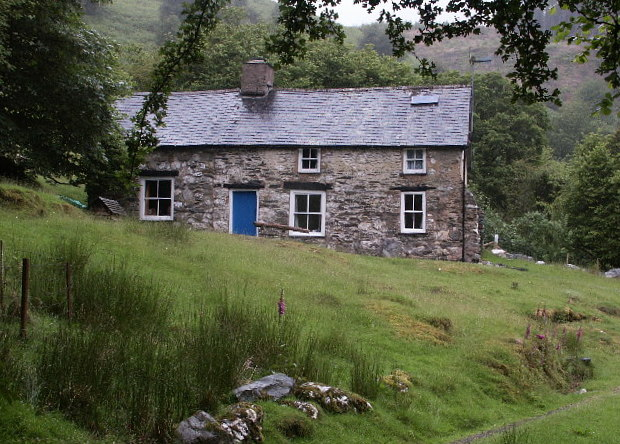
Three songs on Led Zeppelin III were written by Page and Plant while holidaying in Bron-Yr-Aur cottage.

By 1970, Led Zeppelin had achieved commercial success in both the UK and the US with their first two albums. They were determined to have a proper break, having recorded most of Led Zeppelin II in various locations while on tour, financing the sessions with the album sales and tour receipts. Following an exhausting concert tour of North America that spring, lead singer Robert Plant recommended to guitarist and producer Jimmy Page that they should retreat to Bron-Yr-Aur, an 18th-century cottage in Snowdonia, Wales, on a hilltop overlooking the Dyfi Valley, three miles (4.8 km) north of the market town Machynlleth. Plant had spent holidays there with his family.

This remote setting had no running water or electric power, which encouraged a slight change of musical direction for the band towards an emphasis on acoustic arrangements. Page later explained that the tranquillity of Bron-Yr-Aur stood in sharp contrast to the continual touring of 1969, affecting the overall tone of the songwriting and dominance of acoustic guitars. His playing was influenced by folk guitarists Davey Graham and Bert Jansch, who regularly used alternative guitar tunings. Plant also recalled the band were "obsessed with change" and enjoyed listening to John Fahey. The band specifically wanted a change in direction, to show they could play any style of music they wanted.

== Recording ==
The first recording sessions for Led Zeppelin III took place at Olympic Studios in November 1969. A press statement from manager Peter Grant said the group were recording a non-album track to be released as a single, but this was ultimately abandoned. Further sessions took place towards the end of the year, in between touring, before the decision was made to stop working and take a break at Bron-Yr-Aur. After preparing material for the album there, Page and Plant were joined by drummer John Bonham and bassist/keyboardist John Paul Jones at Headley Grange, a mansion in East Hampshire, to rehearse the songs. The rural atmosphere gave a relaxed feel to the sessions, and the band found it to be a more enjoyable environment in which to develop songs than a studio in the city.

The album was recorded between May and June 1970 at Headley Grange (using the Rolling Stones Mobile Studio) and at Olympic, with further recording at Island Records' Island Studios in Notting Hill the following month. Mixing took place at Ardent Studios, Memphis, in August 1970, partway through the group's sixth American concert tour. The album was produced by Page and engineered by Andy Johns and Terry Manning. Page had first met Manning when the latter's band, Lawson and Four More, had supported Page's old band the Yardbirds in 1966. Manning had been to several Led Zeppelin shows, and this led to Page asking him to engineer the new album.

== Songs ==
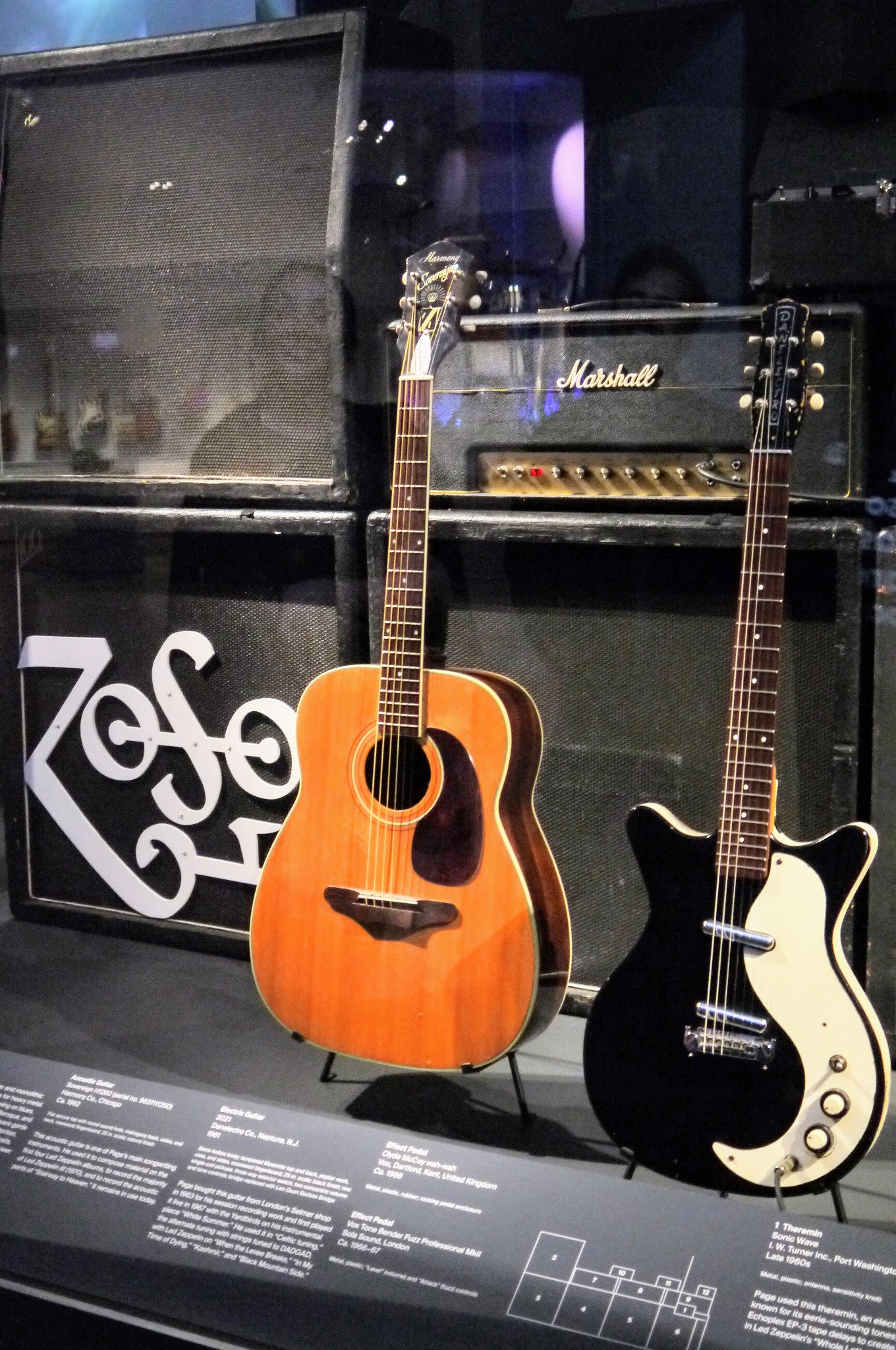
The majority of the album's songs were recorded with Page's 1962 Harmony Sovereign H1260 (left).

Led Zeppelin III marked a change in focus for the band, from late 1960s hard rock to a more acoustic-based sound. These styles had been present to a lesser degree on the band's first two releases, such as "Babe I'm Gonna Leave You" and "Ramble On", from the first and second albums, respectively. However, on this album, the group used more acoustic arrangements, and they would remain prominent to various degrees in the group's later releases. With Led Zeppelin III, the group's songwriting dynamic also changed, from Page's domination of the first two albums towards a more democratic situation in which all four group members contributed their own compositions and ideas. Plant wrote all of the lyrics, with the exception of "Tangerine".

=== Side one ===
"Immigrant Song" was written about the Viking invasions of England and inspired by a short tour of Iceland in June 1970. It was released as a single in the US and became a top 20 hit. It was the opening song for the band's appearance at the Bath Festival of Blues and Progressive Music and at subsequent gigs for the next two years. It was included in the 2003 movie School of Rock, after Jack Black made a short video with fans asking for permission for its use. Page clarified that the song's opening is a combination of a voice and echo feedback.

"Friends" is an acoustic track that uses a C6 tuning on guitar. Page explained: "I played a Harmony acoustic tuned to C–A–C–G–C–E on 'Friends' ... It's a C [type] tuning, but not a [typical] C tuning. I made it up." The song includes a string section arranged by Jones, which Page had wanted to achieve an Indian style of sound. The song was re-recorded as an experimental arrangement with the "Bombay Orchestra" (most likely the informal name of a group of freelance musicians brought together by flautist Vijay Raghav Rao) in March 1972, along with "Four Sticks" from the following untitled album. That arrangement appeared on the 2015 reissue of the retrospective album Coda. The song segues into "Celebration Day" via a Moog synthesiser drone.

"Since I've Been Loving You" was one of the first songs to be written for the album, in late 1969. It is a blues song in the key of C minor, featuring Jones on Hammond organ and bass pedals, simultaneously. The song became a live performance staple for the band throughout the rest of their career, replacing "I Can't Quit You Baby" from the first album as the band's slow blues showcase, with Page's guitar solo featured on both the recorded version and in the band's live show.

"Out on the Tiles" was mostly written by Bonham, who came up with the idea for the riffs that run through the track. The introduction was used to open live versions of "Black Dog" (from Led Zeppelin IV) and Bonham's drum solo on the 1977 US tour.

=== Side two ===
"Gallows Pole" is an updated arrangement of a traditional folk song called "The Maid Freed from the Gallows", inspired by a version recorded by Fred Gerlach. Page played a variety of acoustic and electric guitars and banjo, while Jones played mandolin as well as bass. It was reworked by Page and Plant for their 1994 album No Quarter: Jimmy Page and Robert Plant Unledded.

"Tangerine" was written by Page in 1968, when the Yardbirds were still together. The track features pedal steel guitar as well as acoustic. It was added to the group's live acoustic set in 1971 and performed regularly into the following year. It was then revived as a four-part harmony arrangement in 1975.

"That's the Way" had the original title of "The Boy Next Door". It was written in Bron-Yr-Aur about the problems two people faced in a relationship and the clashes with their families. The song became a staple of the group's acoustic set throughout the 1970s and was played at the Bath Festival, where Led Zeppelin performed acoustically for the first time in the UK. Page thought highly of Plant's lyrics and considered it a breakthrough in their development as a songwriting team. The pair had gone for a walk and, on their return, sat down by a ravine with a tape recorder, where Page started to play the tune, to which Plant improvised a verse.

"Bron-Y-Aur Stomp" was originally called "Jennings Farm Blues" and recorded as an electric arrangement, at the end of 1969. It was subsequently reworked as an acoustic number and featured Bonham playing spoons.

The closing track, "Hats Off to (Roy) Harper", was based on the Bukka White blues song "Shake 'Em On Down" and named as a tribute to their friend and folk singer, Roy Harper. The original LP credited the arrangement to "Charles Obscure", a band in-joke. It features Plant's voice fed through a vibrato amplifier.

=== Unreleased material ===
Page said that the group had 16 tracks to choose from for release on Led Zeppelin III. Six other songs that were recorded during the Led Zeppelin III sessions were released at a later date: "Poor Tom" was released on Coda; "Bron-Yr-Aur" was included on the 1975 double album Physical Graffiti; "Hey, Hey, What Can I Do" was released as the B-side to the 1970 "Immigrant Song" single, and on the 1972 sampler album The New Age of Atlantic, later appearing on the first box set in 1990 and then Coda (Deluxe Edition) in 2015, along with "St. Tristan's Sword"; and both "Jennings Farm Blues" and "Key to the Highway/Trouble in Mind" later appeared on the 2014 deluxe edition of the album.

== Packaging and artwork ==
The volvelle used on the front cover

Led Zeppelin III's original vinyl edition was packaged in a gatefold sleeve with an innovative cover, designed by Zacron, a multi-media artist whom Page had met in 1963 whilst Zacron was a student at Kingston College of Art. Zacron subsequently graduated from the Royal Academy of Arts and became a lecturer at the University of Leeds. Page asked him if he would help design a sleeve for the album, which he helped arrange in January 1970.

The cover and interior gatefold art consisted of a surreal collection of seemingly random images on a white background, many of them connected thematically with flight or aviation. Behind the front cover was a rotatable laminated card disc, or volvelle, covered with more images, including photos of the band members, which showed through holes in the cover; moving an image into place behind one hole would usually bring one or two others into place behind other holes. The back cover was a composite shot of the best photographs from the photography sessions. Zacron chose the images because he wanted to "show them as the giant force they were in music". In France, this album was released with a different album cover, simply showing a photo of the four band members.

Zacron later said that, upon his completion of the artwork, Page telephoned him while he was in New York to express his satisfaction with the results, saying, "I think it is fantastic". However, he later thought the artwork was unsatisfactory because of working to a deadline.

== Release and reception ==
Retrospective professional reviews
Review scores
Source	Rating
AllMusic	5/5 stars
Christgau's Record Guide	B+
Classic Rock	4.5/5 stars
The Daily Telegraph	4/5 stars
Encyclopedia of Popular Music	4/5 stars
The Great Rock Discography	9/10
MusicHound Rock	3.5/5
Q	5/5 stars
The Rolling Stone Album Guide	4/5 stars
Tom Hull – on the Web	A

Led Zeppelin III was one of the most anticipated albums of 1970, and advance orders in the US alone were close to the million mark. The volvelle-designed sleeve held up production and caused a two-month delay. In the run-up to release, the group bought a full-page advertisement in Melody Maker magazine at the end of September, which simply said, "Thank you for making us the world's number one band." The album was released in the US on 5 October, then in the UK on 23 October. It immediately topped the British charts.

Although the band's expanding musical boundaries were greeted warmly by some, detractors attacked the heavier tracks as being mindless noise. In a review for Rolling Stone, critic Lester Bangs praised "That's the Way" as "beautiful and genuinely moving", while characterising the band's heavier songs as crude and little differentiated from each other. Others criticised the acoustic material for imitating the music of Crosby, Stills, Nash & Young, which Page disputed, as the group had featured a similar style on both of their previous albums. Page later said that the negative press given to the third album affected him so much that he did not give press interviews for 18 months after its release, adding that the criticism was one of the reasons why the band's untitled follow-up album contained no written information on it at all. Page later came to believe that journalists had little time to listen to the material and were simply looking for "the new 'Whole Lotta Love'" instead of appreciating the album on its own merits.

A positive review came from Robert Christgau, who originally assigned it an A-minus grade and wrote in his "Consumer Guide" review for The Village Voice: "I have always approved theoretically of Led Zep's concept, and now the group has finally whipped it into shape. It's amazing to realize that Robert Plant's vocals can convey that same overbearing power when Page plays acoustic, as he does to great effect on several cuts here. No drum solos, either. Heavy."

Led Zeppelin III was a trans-Atlantic number one hit. In the UK, it reached No. 1 on 7 November 1970 and remained on the chart for 40 weeks. In the US, it entered the chart at No. 3 on 24 October and reached No. 1 the following week. It remained on the chart for 19 weeks and was certified Gold on 8 October 1970. However, following the lukewarm, if not confused and sometimes dismissive reception from critics, sales lagged after this initial peak.

Despite mostly indifferent reviews and lower sales than Led Zeppelin's previous two albums, Led Zeppelin III's reputation has increased over time. The RIAA certified the album 2 times platinum in 1990, and 6 times platinum in 1999. The 2014 reissue of the album helped itself get back into the Billboard Top 10.

Accolades for Led Zeppelin III
Publication	Country	Accolade	Year	Rank
The Book of Rock Lists	US	"The Top 40 Albums (1970)"	1981	39
Mojo	UK	"The 100 Greatest Albums Ever Made"	1996	99
Colin Larkin	UK	All Time Top 1000 Albums	1998	361
Q	UK	"50 Best British Albums Ever"	2004	9
Robert Dimery	US	1001 Albums You Must Hear Before You Die	2005	*
Classic Rock	UK	"100 Greatest British Rock Album Ever"	2006	31
Loudwire	US	"The Best Hard Rock Album of Each Year Since 1970"	2024	1
(*) designates unordered lists.

== 2014 reissue ==
2014 reissue ratings
Aggregate scores
Source	Rating
Metacritic	98/100
Review scores
Source	Rating
The Austin Chronicle	3.5/5 stars
Consequence of Sound	A−
Paste	9/10
Pitchfork	9.5/10
Q	5/5 stars
Rolling Stone	5/5 stars

Along with the group's self-titled debut album and their second album, Led Zeppelin II, the album was remastered and reissued on 2 June 2014. The reissue comes in six formats: a standard CD edition; a deluxe two-CD edition; a standard LP version; a deluxe two-LP version; a super deluxe two-CD plus two-LP version with a hardback book; and as high-resolution, 24-bit/96k digital downloads. The deluxe and super deluxe editions feature bonus material containing alternative takes, backing tracks and the previously unreleased songs "Bathroom Sound", "Jennings Farm Blues" and "Key to the Highway/Trouble in Mind". The LP versions replicate the original volvelle sleeve design. The reissue was released with an inverted colour version of the original album's artwork as its bonus disc's cover.

The reissue was met with widespread critical acclaim. At Metacritic, which assigns a normalised rating out of 100 to reviews from mainstream publications, the album received an average score of 98, based on 10 reviews. The bonus disc was hailed by Pitchfork journalist Mark Richardson as "easily the best" of the three reissues. In Rolling Stone, David Fricke wrote of highlights in the bonus disc: "'Jennings Farm Blues', an electric run at the folk gallop 'Bron-Y-Aur Stomp', shows Zeppelin exploring options, and the medley 'Keys to the Highway/Trouble in Mind', by Page and Plant, feels like a deep-blues breath before the next rush forward."

== Track listing ==
=== Original release ===
Side one
No.	Title	Writer(s)	Length
1.	"Immigrant Song"	Jimmy Page; Robert Plant	2:26
2.	"Friends"	Page; Plant	3:55
3.	"Celebration Day"	Page; Plant; John Paul Jones	3:29
4.	"Since I've Been Loving You"	Page; Plant; Jones	7:25
5.	"Out on the Tiles"	Page; Plant; John Bonham	4:04
Total length:			21:19

Side two
No.	Title	Writer(s)	Length
1.	"Gallows Pole"	Traditional arr. Page and Plant	4:58
2.	"Tangerine"	Page	3:12
3.	"That's the Way"	Page; Plant	5:38
4.	"Bron-Y-Aur Stomp"	Page; Plant; Jones	4:20
5.	"Hats Off to (Roy) Harper"	Traditional arr. Charles Obscure	3:41
Total length:			21:49 43:08

=== Deluxe edition (2014) ===
2014 deluxe edition bonus disc
No.	Title	Writer(s)	Recording Date	Length
1.	"The Immigrant Song" (alternate mix)	Page; Plant	29 May 1970	2:25
2.	"Friends" (backing track – no vocal)	Page; Plant	5 June 1970	3:43
3.	"Celebration Day" (alternate mix)	Page; Plant; Jones	3 June 1970	3:18
4.	"Since I've Been Loving You" (rough mix of first recording)	Page; Plant; Jones	5 June 1970	7:16
5.	"Bathroom Sound" ("Out on the Tiles" backing track – no vocal)	Page; Plant; Bonham	3 June 1970	4:00
6.	"Gallows Pole" (rough mix)	Traditional arr. Page and Plant	5 July 1970	5:17
7.	"That's the Way" (rough mix with dulcimer and backwards echo)		30 May 1970	5:22
8.	"Jennings Farm Blues" ("Bron-Y-Aur Stomp" rough mix of all guitar overdubs that day)	Page; Plant; Jones	13 December 1970	5:54
9.	"Key to the Highway" / "Trouble in Mind" (rough mix)	Big Bill Broonzy; Charlie Segar / Richard M. Jones	10 June 1970	4:05
Total length:				41:29

== Personnel ==
=== Led Zeppelin ===
- John Bonham – drums, percussion
- John Paul Jones – bass, Hammond organ, Moog synthesiser, mandolin, double bass in "Bron-Y-Aur Stomp", string arrangement in "Friends"
- Jimmy Page – guitars, pedal steel guitar, banjo, bass and dulcimer on "That's the Way", production
- Robert Plant – vocals

=== Production ===
- Peter Grant – executive producer
- Andy Johns – recording engineer, mixing engineer
- Terry Manning – mixing engineer, mastering engineer
- Zacron – cover artwork

== Charts ==
=== Weekly charts ===
1970–1971 weekly chart performance for Led Zeppelin III
Chart (1970–1971)	Peak position
Australian Albums (Kent Music Report)	1
Canada Top Albums/CDs (RPM)	1
Danish Albums Chart	11
Dutch Albums (Album Top 100)	3
Finnish Albums (The Official Finnish Charts)	2
German Albums (Offizielle Top 100)	3
Italian Albums (Musica e Dischi)	1
Japanese Albums (Oricon)	8
Norwegian Albums (VG-lista)	3
Spanish Albums Chart	6
UK Albums (Official Charts)	1
US Billboard 200	1

2014 weekly chart performance for Led Zeppelin III
Chart (2014)	Peak position
Australian Albums (ARIA)	23
Austrian Albums (Ö3 Austria)	24
Belgian Albums (Ultratop Flanders)	19
Belgian Albums (Ultratop Wallonia)	17
Danish Albums (Hitlisten)	11
Finnish Albums (Suomen virallinen lista)	7
French Albums (SNEP)	16
Hungarian Albums (MAHASZ)	5
Italian Albums (FIMI)	21
New Zealand Albums (RMNZ)	7
Portuguese Albums (AFP)	16
Scottish Albums (Official Charts)	7
Spanish Albums (Promusicae)	19
Swedish Albums (Sverigetopplistan)	14
Swiss Albums (Schweizer Hitparade)	20

=== Year-end charts ===
1971 year-end chart performance for Led Zeppelin III
Chart (1971)	Position
West German Albums Chart	22

== Certifications ==
Certifications for Led Zeppelin III
Region	Certification	Certified units/sales
Argentina (CAPIF)	Platinum	60,000^{^}
Australia (ARIA)	3× Platinum	210,000^{^}
Canada (Music Canada)	Gold	50,000^{^}
France (SNEP)	Platinum	300,000^{*}
Germany (BVMI)	Gold	250,000^{^}
Italy (FIMI) sales since 2009	Platinum	50,000^{‡}
Norway (IFPI Norway)	Silver	20,000
Spain (Promusicae)	Gold	50,000^{^}
Switzerland (IFPI Switzerland)	Gold	25,000^{^}
United Kingdom (BPI)	Platinum	300,000^{^}
United States (RIAA)	6× Platinum	6,000,000^{^}
^{*} Sales figures based on certification alone.^{^} Shipments figures based on certification alone.^{‡} Sales+streaming figures based on certification alone.

== Bibliography ==
- Alfred (2010). Led Zeppelin – III Platinum Edition Piano/Vocal/Chords. Van Nuys, California: Alfred Music. ISBN 978-1470637989.
- Lewis, Dave (1990). Led Zeppelin: A Celebration. Omnibus Press. ISBN 978-0-711-92416-1. Archived from the original on 25 October 2020.
- Lewis, Dave (2012). From a Whisper to a Scream: The Complete Guide to the Music of Led Zeppelin. Omnibus Press. ISBN 978-0-857-12788-4.
- McParland, Robert (2018). Myth and Magic in Heavy Metal Music. McFarland. ISBN 978-1-476-63298-8.
- Welch, Chris (1994). Led Zeppelin. London: Orion Books. ISBN 978-1-85797-930-5.
