= Physical Graffiti =

Studio album by Led Zeppelin
- Released: 24 February 1975
- Recorded: July 1970; January–February 1971; May 1972; January–February 1974
- Genre: Hard rock
- Length: 82:59
- Label: Swan Song
- Producer: Jimmy Page

Led Zeppelin chronology
Houses of the Holy (1973)	Physical Graffiti (1975)	Presence (1976)

Singles from Physical Graffiti
- 1. "Trampled Under Foot" / "Black Country Woman" Released: 2 April 1975

Physical Graffiti is the sixth studio album by the English rock band Led Zeppelin. Released as a double album on 24 February 1975 in the United States and on 28 February 1975 in the United Kingdom, it was the group's first album to be released under their new label, Swan Song Records. The band wrote and recorded eight new songs for the album in early 1974 at Headley Grange, a country house in Hampshire, which gave them ample time to improvise arrangements and experiment with recording. The total playing time covered just under three sides of an LP, so they decided to expand it into a double album by including seven previously unreleased tracks from the sessions for the band's earlier albums Led Zeppelin III (1970), Led Zeppelin IV (1971) and Houses of the Holy (1973). The album covered a range of styles including hard rock, progressive rock, rock 'n' roll and folk. The album was then mixed over summer 1974 and planned for an end-of-year release; however, its release was delayed because the Peter Corriston–designed die-cut album cover proved difficult to manufacture.

Physical Graffiti was commercially and critically successful upon its release and debuted at number one on album charts in the UK and number three in the United States. It was promoted by a successful US tour and a five-night residency at Earl's Court, London. The album has been reissued on CD several times, including an expansive 40th anniversary edition in 2015. Physical Graffiti was later certified 16× platinum in the United States by the Recording Industry Association of America (RIAA) in 2006, signifying shipments of over eight million copies in the US.

== Recording ==
The first attempt by Led Zeppelin to record songs for Physical Graffiti took place in November 1973 at Headley Grange in Hampshire, England, where they had previously recorded their untitled fourth album. The recording equipment consisted of Ronnie Lane's Mobile Studio. Guitarist and producer Jimmy Page and drummer John Bonham recorded an instrumental which was later reworked as "Kashmir" during this visit. However, these sessions quickly came to a halt, and the studio time was turned over to Bad Company, who used it to record songs for their debut album. The press reported that bassist/keyboardist John Paul Jones was ill and unable to record. However, he had become disillusioned with the group and tired of touring, and told manager Peter Grant he was considering quitting. (Note: Jones later joked that he had considered becoming the choirmaster at Winchester Cathedral had he left Led Zeppelin in 1973.) Grant asked him to reconsider and to take the rest of the year off to recuperate.

The group reconvened at Headley Grange in January and February 1974, where they recorded eight tracks engineered by Ron Nevison. Lead singer Robert Plant later referred to these eight tracks as "the belters," including "off-the-wall stuff that turned out really nice." As with previous sessions at Headley Grange, the informal atmosphere allowed the group to improvise and develop material while recording. Sometimes the group would rehearse or record a track several times, discuss what went wrong or what could be improved, and then realise they'd worked out a better alternative arrangement. Bonham was a driving force in the sessions, regularly suggesting ideas and the best ways to play complicated arrangements successfully. This led to him getting a lead songwriting credit on several tracks.

The eight songs extended beyond the length of a conventional album, nearly spanning three sides of an LP, so the group decided to create a double album and add material they'd recorded for previous albums but never issued. This included various jam sessions such as "Boogie with Stu," which Page thought would be unsuitable as a track on a single album. Additional overdubs were laid down, and the final mixing of the album was performed in July 1974 by Keith Harwood at Olympic Studios, London. Page coined the title Physical Graffiti to reflect the physical and written energy that went into producing the set.

The band was also working on a track titled "Swan Song", with instrumental portions recorded during the Physical Graffiti sessions in 1974, with plans to add lyrics. The song was ultimately left off the album, but Page wanted to revisit it, and his 1980s band The Firm recorded a version of it called "Midnight Moonlight". The original track was never released, but can be heard in various bootlegs.

== Songs ==
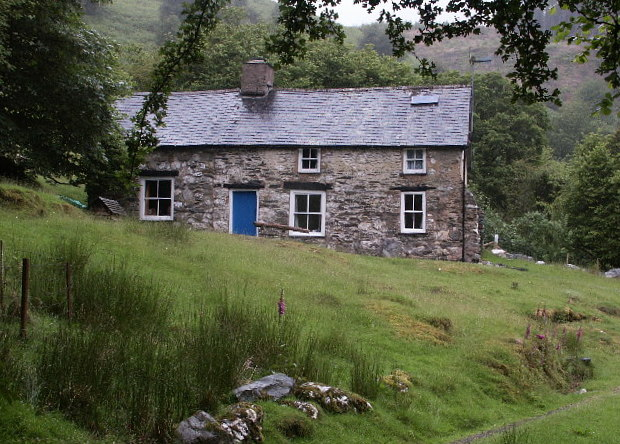
Bron-Yr-Aur cottage was the birthplace of "The Rover", "Bron-Yr-Aur", and "Down by the Seaside".

The album spanned several years of recording and covered a range of musical styles, including hard rock ("Custard Pie", "The Rover", "The Wanton Song", "Sick Again", "Houses of the Holy"), eastern-influenced orchestral rock ("Kashmir"), progressive rock ("In the Light"), driving funk ("Trampled Under Foot"), acoustic rock and roll ("Boogie with Stu", "Black Country Woman"), love ballad ("Ten Years Gone"), blues rock ("In My Time of Dying"), soft rock ("Down by the Seaside"), country rock romp ("Night Flight"), and acoustic guitar instrumental ("Bron-Yr-Aur").

Several tracks from the album became live staples at Led Zeppelin concerts, particularly "In My Time of Dying", "Trampled Under Foot", "Kashmir", "Ten Years Gone", "Black Country Woman", and "Sick Again".

=== Side one ===
"Custard Pie" was recorded at Headley Grange in early 1974. The first take was played at a faster tempo than the finished version, with various improvised vocals. After a basic run-through, the group then discussed possibilities for rearranging it. Page played the guitar solo through an ARP synthesiser, while Jones overdubbed a Hohner Clavinet part and Plant played harmonica.

"The Rover" was written in 1970 at Bron-Yr-Aur, a cottage near Machynlleth, Wales. It was first recorded at Headley Grange in May 1970 as an acoustic number for Led Zeppelin III. It was reworked as an electric number in 1972 for Houses of the Holy, which formed the basis for the backing track. Page subsequently added guitar overdubs in 1974 with Keith Harwood engineering. (Note: The original sleeve features the credit "Guitar lost by Nevison, salvaged by the grace of Harwood" and refers to the various recording sessions for the track.)

"In My Time of Dying" is based on a traditional song that Bob Dylan recorded on his debut album in 1962. The track was recorded live, with Page later adding further slide guitar overdubs. Bonham led the arrangement and structure, deciding where the stop/start sections should fall and how the group would know when to come back in. The very end of the song features his off-mic cough, causing the rest of the group to break down. Bonham subsequently shouted "That's got to be the one, hasn't it?", feeling it was the best take. It was left on the album to show fans that Led Zeppelin were a working band that took care in their recordings.

=== Side two ===
"Houses of the Holy" was recorded as the title track for the album of the same name in May 1972 at Olympic Studios with Eddie Kramer engineering. It was left off that album because it was too similar to other tracks, such as "Dancing Days", which were considered better. Unlike some of the other older material on Physical Graffiti, it required no further overdubbing or remixing.

"Trampled Under Foot" developed from a jam session driven by Jones at the Clavinet. The song went through several arrangement changes before reaching the version heard on the album, with the group rehearsing different ideas and arguing over the overall style. Bonham decided the track was too "souly" and rearranged it into a funk style, suggesting that Page should play a guitar riff throughout in place of chords. The lyrics are a series of double entendres around driving and cars. The song quickly became a popular live piece played at many shows from 1975 onwards, and was later revived by Plant for his solo tours. It was released as a single in the US on 2 April (with "Black Country Woman" as the B-side) and was a top 40 hit.

"Kashmir" was an idea from Page and Bonham, and was first attempted as an instrumental demo in late 1973. Plant wrote the lyrics while on holiday in Morocco. Jones played Mellotron on the track and arranged strings and brass parts played by session musicians. The song was one of the album's most critically acclaimed tracks and was played at every gig from 1975 onwards. Page and Plant played it on their 1994 tour, and it was reworked in 1998 by Sean "Puffy" Combs for his single "Come With Me" which featured Page on guitar.

=== Side three ===
"In the Light" was recorded at Headley Grange in early 1974. It was initially called "In the Morning" and went through several rehearsals and takes to work out a basic structure. Page later added a drone/chant introduction.

"Bron-Yr-Aur" was a solo acoustic piece by Page, named after the cottage where he had composed and arranged much of Led Zeppelin III with Plant. It was recorded at Island Studios in mid-1970. The track was later used as background music in the group's film The Song Remains the Same.

"Down by the Seaside" was originally written as an acoustic track at Bron-Yr-Aur in 1970, and was influenced by Neil Young. The band reworked it as an electric track during sessions for the fourth album the following year. Page and Bonham led the arrangement, changing the tempo from slow to fast and back again.

"Ten Years Gone" was mostly composed by Plant about an old love affair, and was combined with an instrumental piece from Page, featuring overdubbed electric and acoustic guitar parts. When the track was performed live, Jones played a triple-neck guitar featuring mandolin, six- and 12-string guitars to reproduce the various guitar overdubs on the studio recording.

=== Side four ===
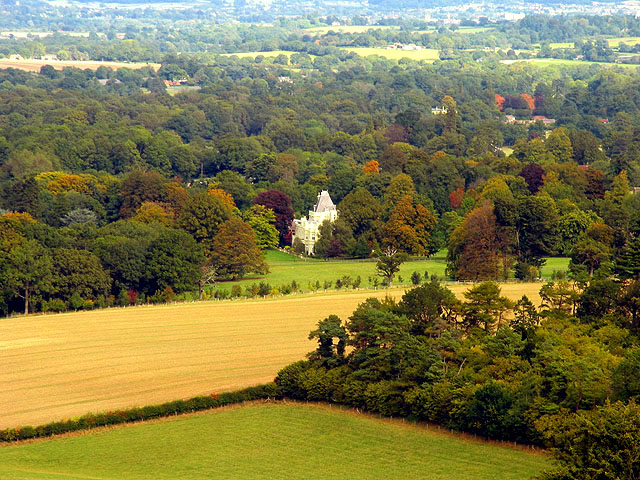
Some older material for Physical Graffiti was recorded at Stargroves.

"Night Flight" was recorded at Headley Grange in 1971 for the fourth album. In addition to the usual bass, Jones plays Hammond organ on the track, and Page plays guitar through a Leslie speaker. Plant wrote the lyrics after reading a news headline entitled "Nuclear Damage Test Threat" and wondered why there seemed to be little peace and love in the world.

"The Wanton Song" was built around a Page guitar riff. Unlike some of the other tracks recorded at the 1974 Headley Grange sessions, it was straightforward to arrange, with the group building the song around the riffs.

"Boogie with Stu" was a jam session with Rolling Stones pianist Ian Stewart based around the Ritchie Valens song "Ooh My Head". (Note: The track is co-credited to "Mrs. Valens", a reference to Ritchie's mother. The credit came after the band learned she never received any royalties from her son's hits.) It was recorded in 1971 at Headley Grange during the same session that produced "Rock and Roll" for the group's fourth album. It did not credit Valens or Bob Keane, instead crediting Valens' mother. Eventually a lawsuit was filed by Keane, and half of the award went to Valens' mother, although she was not part of the suit.

"Black Country Woman" was recorded in the garden at Stargroves in 1972 for Houses of the Holy, as part of the group's desire to work in "off the wall" locations outside a traditional studio environment. The track was nearly abandoned when an aeroplane cruised overhead, but it was left on the final recording for effect.

Page and Plant wrote "Sick Again" about the 1973 tour and their experience meeting groupies. Bonham's drumming and Page's guitar riffs drove the track. The arrangement had been worked out before recording, and was straightforward to put down on tape.

=== Unreleased material ===
As Physical Graffiti collected various outtakes from earlier albums, little from the recording sessions was left over and not eventually released. An early arrangement of "Custard Pie", different from the final version, was reworked as "Hots on For Nowhere" on the following album, Presence. A number of other outtakes from earlier album sessions that had not been put on Physical Graffiti were later included on the 1982 album Coda.

== Artwork and packaging ==
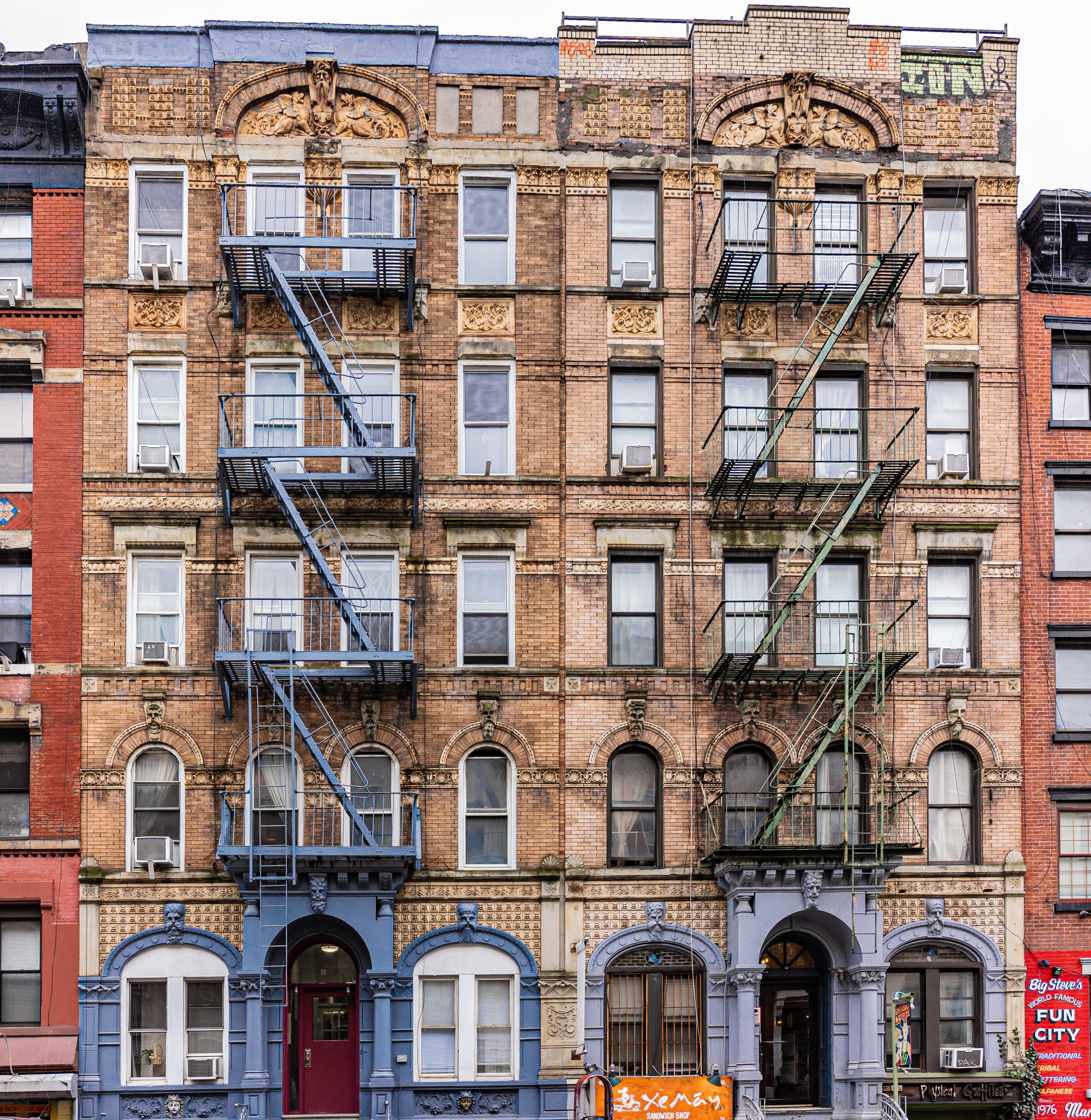
The five-storey 96 and 98 St. Mark's Place in New York's East Village

The album was originally released with a die-cut sleeve design depicting a New York City tenement block, through whose windows various cultural icons could be interchangeably viewed. Art director Mike Doud and album designer Peter Corriston were looking for a symmetrical building with interesting details that wasn't obstructed by other objects and would fit the square album cover. They then developed the rest of the cover around the idea of people moving in and out of the tenement, with various sleeves that could be placed under the main cover and fill the windows with different pieces of information.

The two 5-storey buildings photographed for the album cover are located at 96 and 98 St. Mark's Place in New York City. The original photograph underwent a number of tweaks to arrive at the final image. The fourth floor had to be cropped out to fit the square album cover format. (The front doorway and stoop at 96 St. Mark's Place is also the location used by the Rolling Stones for the music video promoting their single "Waiting on a Friend", from their 1981 album Tattoo You).

Eschewing the usual gatefold design in favour of a special die-cut cover, the original album jacket included four covers made up of two inners (for each disc), a middle insert cover and an outer cover. The middle insert cover is white and details all the album track listings and recording information. The outer cover has die-cut windows on the building, so when the middle cover is wrapped around the inner covers and slid into the outer cover, the title of the album is shown on the front cover, spelling out the name "Physical Graffiti". Images in the windows touched upon a set of American icons and a range of Hollywood ephemera. Pictures of W. C. Fields and Buzz Aldrin alternated with the snapshots of Led Zeppelin. Photographs of Lee Harvey Oswald, Marcel Duchamp and Pope Leo XIII are also featured. Per the liner notes, AGI/Mike Doud (London) and Peter Corriston (New York) created the package concept and design. Elliott Erwitt, B. P. Fallon, and Roy Harper photographed the album. "Tinting Extraordinaire": Maurice Tate, and window illustration by Dave Heffernan. In 1976, the album was nominated for a Grammy Award in the category of best album package.

== Release and critical reception ==
Professional ratings
Review scores
Source	Rating
AllMusic	5/5 stars
Christgau's Record Guide	B+
The Daily Telegraph	5/5 stars
Encyclopedia of Popular Music	4/5 stars
MusicHound Rock	4.5/5
Q	5/5 stars
The Rolling Stone Album Guide	4/5 stars
Tom Hull – on the Web	B+
The Village Voice	B

Physical Graffiti was Led Zeppelin's first release on their own Swan Song Records label, launched in May 1974. Until this point, all of Led Zeppelin's albums had been released on Atlantic Records, which would distribute Swan Song. The album was first announced to the press on 6 November with a planned release date of 29 November and an accompanying US tour (the band's tenth) starting in January. Delays in producing the album's sleeve design prevented its release before the tour began. It was finally released on 24 February 1975.

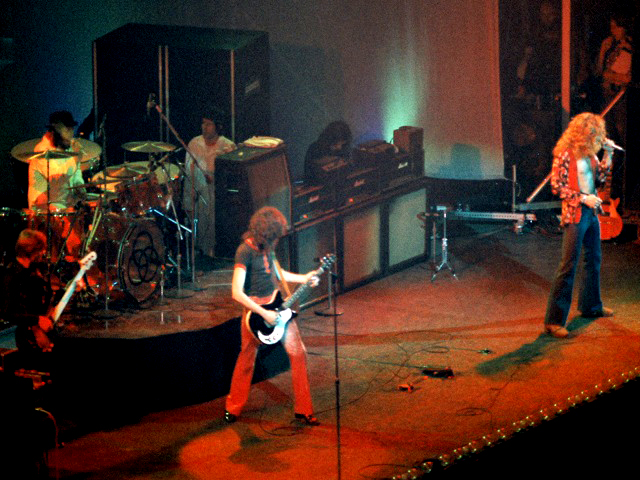
Led Zeppelin touring the US shortly before the release of Physical Graffiti

The album was a commercial and critical success, building a huge advance order after the delayed release date; when it was eventually issued, it reached No. 1 in the UK charts. In the US, it debuted at No. 3 on the Billboard Pop Albums chart, rising to No. 1 the following week and staying there for six weeks. Physical Graffiti has since proven to be one of the most popular releases by the group, shipping 8 million copies in the United States. It was the first album to go platinum on advance orders alone. Shortly after its release, all previous Led Zeppelin albums simultaneously re-entered the top-200 album chart.

The group debuted several songs from Physical Graffiti live at a warm-up gig in Rotterdam, Netherlands, on 11 January, a week before the US tour, which lasted until 27 March. The tour was also successful, and was followed up by a series of shows at Earl's Court, London. Tickets sold out within four hours, and promoter Mel Bush described the demand as "unprecedented demand in the history of rock music", so two further dates were added. The shows attracted rave reviews, and critics noted the band enjoyed playing the new material on Physical Graffiti more than the older songs.

NME's Nick Kent reviewed the album three months before it was released. He speculated it could be the group's best work to date, saying "the album's tonal density is absolutely the toughest, most downright brutal I've heard all year". In March 1975, Billboard magazine's reviewer wrote: "[Physical Graffiti] is a tour de force through a number of musical styles, from straight rock to blues to folky acoustic to orchestral sounds." Similarly, Jim Miller stated in Rolling Stone that the double album was "the band's Tommy, Beggar's Banquet and Sgt. Pepper rolled into one: Physical Graffiti is Led Zeppelin's bid for artistic respectability". Village Voice critic Robert Christgau maintained his long-held ambivalence regarding Led Zeppelin, writing that except for side two, the material often wanders into "wide tracks, misconceived opi, and so forth", and "after a while Robert Plant begins to grate".

In 2003, Rolling Stone ranked it at number 70 on the magazine's list of the "500 Greatest Albums of All Time". It was re-ranked at number 73 in a 2012 revised list, and re-ranked at number 144 in 2020.

Plant later felt that Physical Graffiti represented the band at its creative peak, and has since said that it is his favourite Led Zeppelin album. Page has also said the album was a "high-water mark" for the group, and the creative energy from jamming and gradually working out song structures together led to some strong material. Reviewing the album for BBC Music in 2007, Chris Jones described it as "a towering monument to the glory of Zeppelin in their high-flying heyday".

Accolades for Physical Graffiti
Publication	Country	Accolade	Year	Rank
Grammy Award	US	"Grammy Award for Best Recording Package"	1976	Nominee
Rolling Stone	US	"The 500 Greatest Albums of All Time"	2020	144
Pitchfork	US	"Top 100 Albums of the 1970s"	2004	95
AllMusic	US	"Top Digital Albums"	2012	20
AllMusic	US	"Top Pop Catalog"	2012	3
AllMusic	US	"Billboard 200"	2012	43
Classic Rock	UK	"100 Greatest Rock Album Ever"	2001	5
Mojo	UK	"The 100 Greatest Albums Ever Made"	1996	47
Q	UK	"100 Greatest Albums Ever"	2003	41
Record Collector	UK	"Classic Albums from 21 Genres for the 21st century"	2005	*
Robert Dimery	US	1001 Albums You Must Hear Before You Die	2005	*
Q	UK	"100 Best Albums Ever"	2006	57
Classic Rock	UK	"100 Greatest British Rock Album Ever"	2006	7
Rock and Roll Hall of Fame	US	"The Definitive 200: Top 200 Albums of All-Time"	2006	93

(*) designates unordered lists.

== Reissues ==
Professional ratings
Aggregate scores
Source	Rating
Metacritic	97/100
Review scores
Source	Rating
Consequence of Sound	A−
The Guardian	5/5 stars
Pitchfork	10/10
Uncut	8/10

Physical Graffiti was first issued on CD as a double-disc set in 1987. However, it was done without input from the band, and the first pressing accidentally edited off the studio banter at the end of "In My Time of Dying" (later fixed on repressings). Page was unhappy with his lack of input over the CDs and decided he would produce new versions himself. He booked a week in May 1990 with engineer George Marino to remaster the entire back catalogue. Eight tracks from Physical Graffiti appeared on the four-disc Boxed Set and three on Remasters, both in 1990; the remainder appeared on Boxed Set 2 in 1993, while the album was properly reissued in 1994.

An extended remastered version of Physical Graffiti was reissued on 23 February 2015, almost exactly forty years after the original album was released. The reissue comes in six formats: a standard two-CD edition, a deluxe three-CD edition, a standard two-LP version, a deluxe three-LP version, a super deluxe three-CD plus three-LP version with a hardback book, and as high resolution 24-bit/96k digital downloads. The deluxe and super deluxe editions feature bonus material containing alternative takes and arrangements of songs. The reissue was released with an altered colour version of the original album's artwork as its bonus disc's cover.

== Track listing ==
=== Original release ===
All tracks are written by Jimmy Page and Robert Plant, except where noted.

Side one
No.	Title	Writer(s)	Date and location	Length
1.	"Custard Pie"		January–February 1974, Headley Grange, Hampshire	4:13
2.	"The Rover"		May 1972, Stargroves (Houses of the Holy outtake)	5:36
3.	"In My Time of Dying"	John Paul Jones; Page; Plant; John Bonham	January–February 1974, Headley Grange	11:04
Total length:				20:53

Side two
No.	Title	Writer(s)	Date recorded	Length
1.	"Houses of the Holy"		May 1972, Olympic Studios, London (Houses of the Holy outtake)	4:01
2.	"Trampled Under Foot"	Jones; Page; Plant	January–February 1974, Headley Grange	5:35
3.	"Kashmir"	Bonham; Page; Plant	January–February 1974, Headley Grange	8:37 (Note: The running times listed for "Kashmir" and "Ten Years Gone" on original LP pressings, and some compact disc versions, of the album were significantly in error; "Kashmir" was listed at 9:41, "Ten Years Gone" at 6:55.)
Total length:				18:13

Side three
No.	Title	Writer(s)	Date recorded	Length
1.	"In the Light"	Jones; Page; Plant	January–February 1974, Headley Grange	8:44
2.	"Bron-Yr-Aur (Note: Some cassette and 8-track versions of the album place "Bron-Yr-Aur" immediately after "Kashmir")"	Page	July 1970, Island Studios, London (Led Zeppelin III outtake)	2:06
3.	"Down by the Seaside"		February 1971, Island Studios, London (Led Zeppelin IV outtake)	5:14
4.	"Ten Years Gone"		January–February 1974, Headley Grange	6:31
Total length:				22:35

Side four
No.	Title	Writer(s)	Date recorded	Length
1.	"Night Flight"	Jones; Page; Plant	January 1971, Headley Grange (Led Zeppelin IV outtake)	3:36
2.	"The Wanton Song"		January–February 1974, Headley Grange	4:06
3.	"Boogie with Stu"	Bonham; Jones; Page; Plant; Ian Stewart; Ritchie Valens	January 1971, Headley Grange (Led Zeppelin IV outtake)	3:51
4.	"Black Country Woman"		May 1972, Stargroves (Houses of the Holy outtake)	4:24
5.	"Sick Again"		January–February 1974, Headley Grange	4:43
Total length:				20:40 (82:59)

=== Deluxe edition (2015) ===
2015 deluxe edition bonus disc
No.	Title	Writer(s)	Length
1.	"Brandy & Coke" ("Trampled Under Foot") (Initial/Rough Mix)	Jones; Page; Plant	5:38
2.	"Sick Again" (Early Version)	Page; Plant	2:20
3.	"In My Time of Dying" (Initial/Rough Mix)	Bonham; Jones; Page; Plant	10:45
4.	"Houses of the Holy" (Rough Mix with Overdubs)	Page; Plant	3:51
5.	"Everybody Makes It Through" ("In the Light", Early Version/In Transit)	Jones; Page; Plant	6:29
6.	"Boogie with Stu" (Sunset Sound Mix)	Bonham; Jones; Page; Plant; Stewart; Valens	3:36
7.	"Driving Through Kashmir" ("Kashmir", Rough Orchestra Mix)	Bonham; Page; Plant	8:33
Total length:			41:29

== Personnel ==
Led Zeppelin

- Robert Plant – vocals, harmonica
- Jimmy Page – electric, acoustic, lap steel and slide guitars, production
- John Paul Jones – bass guitar, keyboards, mandolin, acoustic guitar
- John Bonham – drums, percussion

Additional musicians

- Ian Stewart – piano on "Boogie with Stu"
- Uncredited session musicians – strings and horns on "Kashmir"

Production

- George Chkiantz – engineering at Olympic (1972)
- Keith Harwood – engineering at Olympic (1974)
- Andy Johns – engineering at Island (1970 & 1971) and Headley Grange (1971)
- Eddie Kramer – engineering at Stargroves (1972)
- Ron Nevison – engineering at Headley Grange (1974)
- Peter Grant – executive producer
- George Marino and Jimmy Page – remastered CD release

Artwork

- Peter Corriston – artwork, design, cover design
- Mike Doud – artwork, design, cover design
- Elliot Erwitt – photography
- B. P. Fallon – photography
- Roy Harper – photography
- Dave Heffernan – illustrations

== Charts ==
=== Weekly charts ===
1975 weekly chart performance for Physical Graffiti
Chart (1975)	Peak position
Australian Albums (Kent Music Report)	2
Austrian Albums (Ö3 Austria)	2
Canada Top Albums/CDs (RPM)	1
Dutch Albums (Album Top 100)	7
Finnish Albums (The Official Finnish Charts)	5
German Albums (Offizielle Top 100)	4
Italian Albums (Musica e Dischi)	17
Japanese Albums (Oricon)	13
New Zealand Albums (RMNZ)	3
Norwegian Albums (VG-lista)	4
Spanish Albums Chart	2
UK Albums (Official Charts)	1
US Billboard 200	1

2015 weekly chart performance for Physical Graffiti
Chart (2015)	Peak position
Australian Albums (ARIA)	13
Austrian Albums (Ö3 Austria)	7
Belgian Albums (Ultratop Flanders)	13
Belgian Albums (Ultratop Wallonia)	9
Danish Albums (Hitlisten)	31
Finnish Albums (Suomen virallinen lista)	6
French Albums (SNEP)	23
German Albums (Offizielle Top 100)	4
Hungarian Albums (MAHASZ)	3
Italian Albums (FIMI)	20
New Zealand Albums (RMNZ)	6
Norwegian Albums (VG-lista)	12
Portuguese Albums (AFP)	5
Swedish Albums (Sverigetopplistan)	7
Swiss Albums (Schweizer Hitparade)	8
US Billboard 200	11

=== Year-end charts ===
1975 year-end chart performance for Physical Graffiti
Chart (1975)	Position
Austrian Albums (Ö3 Austria)	7
Canada Top Albums/CDs (RPM)	3
Dutch Albums (Album Top 100)	43
German Albums (Offizielle Top 100)	47
US Billboard 200	10

2015 year-end chart performance for Physical Graffiti
Chart (2015)	Position
Belgian Albums (Ultratop Flanders)	173
Belgian Albums (Ultratop Wallonia)	130

== Certifications ==
Certifications for Physical Graffiti
Region	Certification	Certified units/sales
Argentina (CAPIF)	Gold	30,000^{^}
Australia (ARIA)	2× Platinum	140,000^{^}
France (SNEP)	Gold	100,000^{*}
Germany (BVMI)	Gold	250,000^{^}
Italy (FIMI) sales since 2009	Gold	25,000^{‡}
Japan (RIAJ)	Gold	100,000^{^}
New Zealand (RMNZ)	2× Platinum	30,000^{^}
United Kingdom (BPI)	2× Platinum	600,000^{^}
United States (RIAA)	16× Platinum	8,000,000^{^}
^{*} Sales figures based on certification alone.^{^} Shipments figures based on certification alone.^{‡} Sales+streaming figures based on certification alone.

== See also ==
- List of best-selling albums in the United States
