= Stairway to Heaven =

1971 song by Led Zeppelin

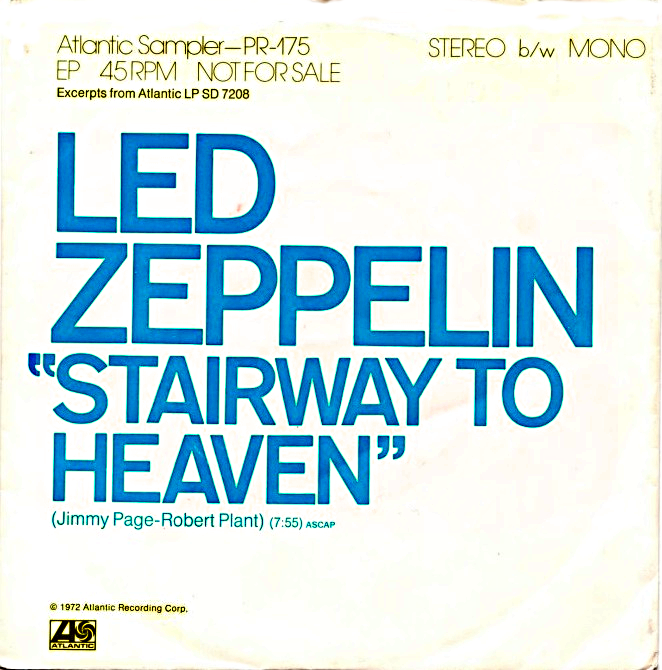
- American radio promotional sleeve

Promotional single by Led Zeppelin

from the album Led Zeppelin IV
- Released: 8 November 1971
- Recorded: December 1970, January 1971, February 1971
- Studio: Island Studios, London; Rolling Stones Mobile Studio, Stargroves, East Woodhay, Hampshire; Ronnie Lane's Mobile Studio, Headley Grange, Hampshire
- Genre: Progressive rock; folk rock; hard rock
- Length: 8:02
- Label: Atlantic
- Songwriters: Jimmy Page; Robert Plant
- Producer: Jimmy Page

Audio
- "Stairway to Heaven" on YouTube

"Stairway to Heaven" is a song by the English rock band Led Zeppelin, released on 8 November 1971 on the band's untitled fourth studio album (commonly known as Led Zeppelin IV), by Atlantic Records. Composed by the band's guitarist Jimmy Page with lyrics written by lead singer Robert Plant, it is widely regarded as one of the greatest rock songs of all time.

The song has three sections, each one progressively increasing in tempo and volume. The song begins in a slow tempo with acoustic instruments (guitar and recorders) before introducing electric instruments. The final section is an uptempo hard rock arrangement, highlighted by Page's guitar solo and Plant's vocals, which ends with the plaintive a cappella line: "And she's buying a stairway to heaven".

"Stairway to Heaven" was voted number three in 2000 by VH1 on its list of the "100 Greatest Rock Songs", in 2004 Rolling Stone magazine ranked "Stairway to Heaven" number 31 on its "500 Greatest Songs of All Time" list. It was the most-requested song on FM radio stations in the United States at the time, despite never having been commercially released as a single in the US. In November 2007, through download sales promoting Led Zeppelin's Mothership release, "Stairway to Heaven" reached number 37 on the UK Singles Chart.

== Writing and recording ==
The initial idea was to have this quite fragile guitar that would open up this piece of music and for something that would accelerate as it went through from beginning to end. [...] but to actually pull this idea off properly [was a different story]. [...] It's all accelerating, it's all moving. [...] It's not necessarily orchestrating [...] but it's overdubbing, increasing the texture as it goes through.

— Jimmy Page of Led Zeppelin, as quoted by Daniel Rachel in The Art of Noise: Conversations with Great Songwriters (2014)

The song originated in 1970 when Jimmy Page and Robert Plant were spending time at Bron-Yr-Aur, a remote cottage in Wales, following Led Zeppelin's fifth American concert tour. According to Page, he wrote the music "over a long period, the first part coming at Bron-Yr-Aur one night". Page always kept a cassette recorder around, and the idea for "Stairway to Heaven" came together from bits of taped music. The first attempts at lyrics, written by Robert Plant next to an evening log fire at Headley Grange, were partly spontaneously improvised and Page claimed, "a huge percentage of the lyrics were written there and then". Page was strumming the chords, and Plant had a pencil and paper.

Led Zeppelin began recording "Stairway to Heaven" in December 1970 at Island Records' new recording studios on Basing Street in London. The song was completed by the addition of lyrics by Plant during the sessions for Led Zeppelin IV at Headley Grange, Hampshire, in 1971. Page then returned to Island Studios to record his guitar solo.

The complete studio recording was released on Led Zeppelin IV in November 1971. The band's record label, Atlantic Records, wanted to issue it as a single, but the band's manager Peter Grant refused requests to do so in both 1972 and 1973. As a result, many people bought the fourth album as if it were the single.

== Composition ==
"Stairway to Heaven"
Three 10-second excerpts demonstrating the different sections of the piece

"Stairway to Heaven" is described as progressive rock, folk rock, and hard rock. The song consists of three sections, beginning with a quiet introduction on a finger-picked, six-string acoustic guitar and four recorders (ending at 2:15) and gradually moving into a slow electric middle section (2:16–5:33), then a long guitar solo (5:34–6:44), before the faster hard rock final section (6:45–7:45), ending with a short vocals-only epilogue. Plant sings the opening, middle and epilogue sections in his mid-vocal range; he sings the hard rock section in his higher range, which borders on falsetto.

Written in the key of A minor, the song opens with an arpeggiated, finger-picked guitar chord progression with a chromatic descending bassline A-G♯-G-F♯-F. Page used a Harmony Sovereign H1260 acoustic guitar and a Fender Electric XII 12-string electric guitar played directly into the board for the rhythm parts. John Paul Jones contributed four overdubbed recorder tracks (probably soprano, alto, tenor, and bass) in the opening section (he used a Mellotron and, later, a Yamaha CP-70B Grand Piano and Yamaha GX1 to synthesise this arrangement in live performances) and a Hohner Electra-Piano electric piano in the middle section.

The sections build with more guitar layers, each complementary to the intro, with the drums entering at 4:18. The extended guitar solo in the song's final section was played for the recording on a 1959 Fender Telecaster given to Page by Jeff Beck (an instrument he used extensively with the Yardbirds) plugged into a Supro amplifier, although in an interview he gave to Guitar World magazine, Page said, "It could have been a Marshall, but I can't remember". Three improvised solos were recorded, with Page agonising about which to keep. Page later revealed, "I did have the first phrase worked out, and then there was the link phrase. I did check them out beforehand before the tape ran." He has likened the song to an orgasm. The Am–G–F–G chord sequence in the third section of the song, centred on A minor, is typical of a chord progression in the Aeolian mode.

== Personnel ==
According to Jean-Michel Guesdon and Philippe Margotin:

- Robert Plant – vocals
- Jimmy Page – acoustic guitars (six-string and twelve-string), electric guitars
- John Paul Jones – bass guitar, electric piano, recorder
- John Bonham – drums

== Live performances ==
The inaugural public performance of the song took place at Belfast's Ulster Hall on 5 March 1971. Bassist John Paul Jones recalls that the crowd was unimpressed: "They were all bored to tears waiting to hear something they knew."

The world radio premiere of "Stairway to Heaven" was recorded at the Paris Cinema on 1 April 1971, in front of a live studio audience, and broadcast three days later on the BBC. The song was performed at almost every subsequent Led Zeppelin concert, only being omitted on rare occasions when shows were cut short for curfews or technical issues. The band's final performance of the song was in Berlin on 7 July 1980, which was also their last full-length concert until 10 December 2007 at London's O2 Arena.

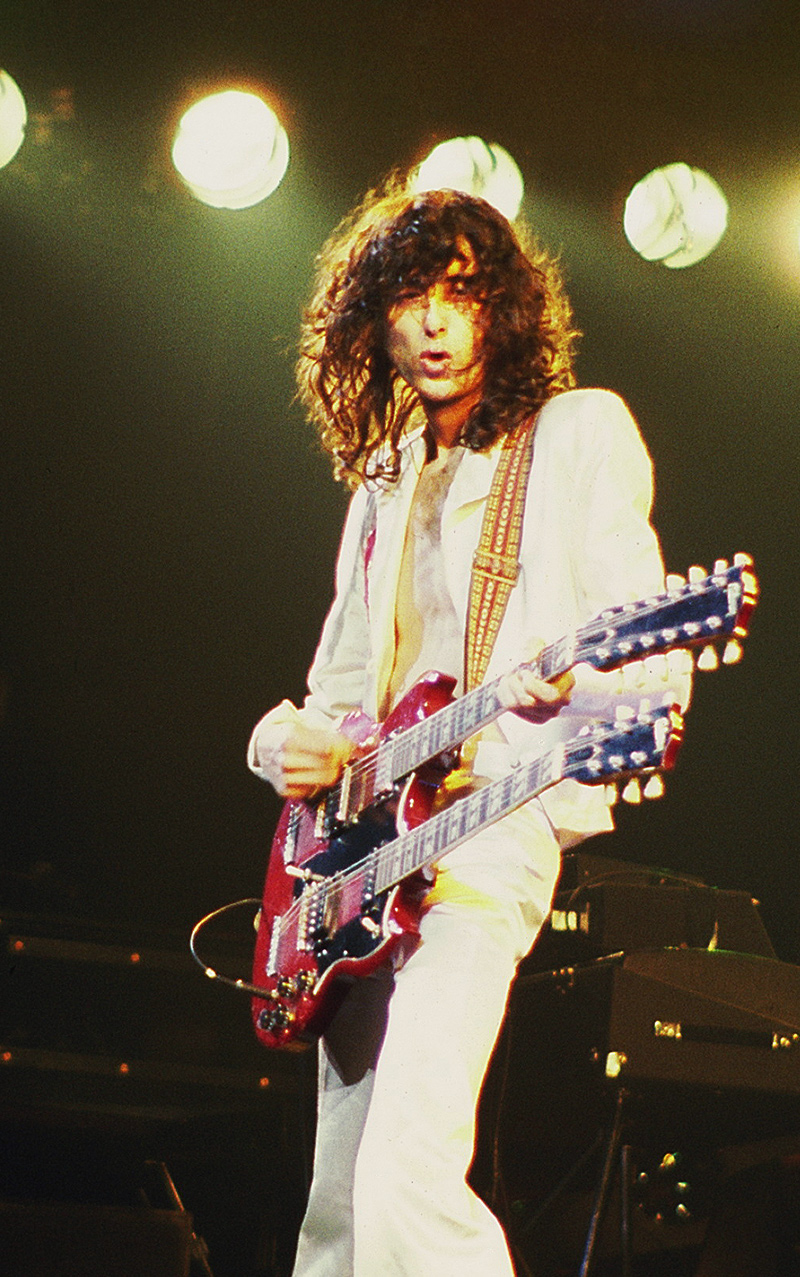
Jimmy Page used a double-necked guitar to perform "Stairway to Heaven" live.

When playing the song live, the band would often extend it to over 10 minutes, with Page playing an extended guitar solo and Plant adding a number of lyrical ad-libs, such as "Does anybody remember laughter?", "And I think you can see that", "wait a minute!" and "I hope so". For performing this song live, Page used a Gibson EDS-1275 double neck guitar so that he would not have to pause when switching from a six to a 12-string guitar, while John Paul Jones used a Mellotron to replicate the sound of the woodwind instruments he used on the studio recording.

By 1975, the band was using the song as its finale in concert. However, after their concert tour of the United States in 1977, Plant began to tire of "Stairway to Heaven": "There's only so many times you can sing it and mean it...It just became sanctimonious."

The song was played again by the surviving members of Led Zeppelin at the Live Aid concert in 1985; at the Atlantic Records 40th Anniversary concert in 1988, with Jason Bonham on drums; and by Jimmy Page as an instrumental version on his solo tours.

The first few bars were played alone during Page and Plant tours in lieu of the final notes of "Babe I'm Gonna Leave You", and in November 1994 Page and Plant performed an acoustic version of the song at a Tokyo news station for Japanese television. "Stairway to Heaven" was also performed at Ahmet Ertegun Tribute Concert at the O2 Arena, London on 10 December 2007.

Plant cites the most unusual performance of the song ever as being that performed at Live Aid: "with two drummers (Phil Collins and Tony Thompson) while Duran Duran cried at the side of the stage – there was something quite surreal about that."

== Sunset Sound mix ==
A slightly different version of this song by Led Zeppelin is included on the remastered deluxe two-CD version of Led Zeppelin IV titled "Stairway to Heaven (Sunset Sound Mix)". Page, along with Peter Grant and Andy Johns, had originally mixed the album at Sunset Sound in Los Angeles. Unhappy with the results, Page created the final mix of the album soon after at Island Studios in London. The Sunset Studio version runs 8:04, two seconds longer than the original version. It is noted by Jones and Page that the Sunset mix is muddier, and also guitar heavy.

== Success and legacy ==
"Stairway to Heaven" is often rated among the greatest rock songs of all time. Music journalist Stephen Davis wrote that the 1971 song ascended to "anthemic" status within two years. Page recalled, "I knew it was good. I didn't know it was going to become like an anthem, but I did know it was the gem of the album, sure."

"Stairway to Heaven" continues to top radio lists of the greatest rock songs, including a 2006 Guitar World readers poll of greatest guitar solos. On the 20th anniversary of the original release of the song, it was announced via US radio sources that the song had logged an estimated 2,874,000 radio plays. As of 2000, the song had been broadcast on radio over three million times. In 1990, a Tampa Bay, Florida, area station (then WKRL) kicked off its all-Led Zeppelin format by playing "Stairway to Heaven" for 24 hours straight. It is also the biggest-selling single piece of sheet music in rock history, with an average of 15,000 copies yearly. In total, over one million copies have been sold.

The band never authorised the song to be edited for single release, despite pressure from Atlantic Records. Page told Rolling Stone in 1975, "We were careful to never release it as a single", which forced buyers to buy the entire album.

In 2004, Rolling Stone magazine put it at number 31 on their list of "The 500 Greatest Songs of All Time", then number 61 in 2021. On 29 January 2009, Guitar World magazine rated Jimmy Page's guitar solo the best of the publication's 100 Greatest Guitar Solos in Rock and Roll History.

In 2001, the New York City-based classic rock radio station WAXQ conducted a listener survey to create a countdown of 1,043 rock songs (the number corresponding with the station's position on the dial at 104.3 FM). "Stairway to Heaven" garnered the most votes from listeners. WAXQ has conducted the survey annually since then; in each subsequent countdown that has followed, including the most recent in November 2025, "Stairway to Heaven" has been the top-ranked song.

Plant once gave $10,000 to listener-supported radio station KBOO in Portland, Oregon, during a pledge drive after the disc jockey solicited donations by promising the station would never play "Stairway to Heaven". Plant was station-surfing in a rental car he was driving to the Oregon Coast after a solo performance in Portland and was impressed with the non-mainstream music the station presented. When asked later for the reason why, Plant replied that it wasn't that he didn't like the song, but he'd heard it before.

"Stairway to Heaven" was selected by the Library of Congress for preservation in the National Recording Registry in 2023, based on its "cultural, historical or aesthetic importance in the nation's recorded sound heritage." That same year, Loudwire reported that the song's lyrics were among the most-searched in the rock genre from January 2019 through July 2023, according to an independent study of data pulled from Google Trends.

The carillon in the tower of Fürth's historic town hall plays "Stairway to Heaven" daily at 12:04 pm.

Many beginner guitarists attempt to learn the song. The taboo of playing the song in music shops has been observed in popular media such as Wayne's World. Writing for WRKR, Joe Davita called it one of the "10 Worst Guitar Center Songs" and said: "When first learning to play guitar, this song feels like a pipedream, but once you've mastered it, it's like Jimmy Page just handed you a rolled up rock 'n' roll diploma. Trust us, not even your parents want to hear you play it, much less any Guitar Center employee."

Page and Plant have long denied requests to license "Stairway to Heaven" for other media. Its incorporation into the initial trailer for Narnia: The Magician's Nephew, in October 2026, marked the first time the song was licensed for such use. The director, Greta Gerwig, met personally with the bandmates to obtain their approval.

== Spirit copyright infringement lawsuit ==
Page's opening acoustic guitar arpeggios bear a resemblance to the 1968 instrumental "Taurus" by the Los Angeles-based rock band Spirit, written by Spirit guitarist Randy California. In the liner notes to the 1996 reissue of Spirit's self-titled debut album, California wrote: "People always ask me why 'Stairway to Heaven' sounds exactly like 'Taurus', which was released two years earlier. I know Led Zeppelin also played 'Fresh Garbage' in their live set. They opened up for us on their first American tour."

In May 2014, Spirit bassist Mark Andes and a trust acting on behalf of California filed a copyright infringement suit against Led Zeppelin and injunction against the "release of the album containing the song" in an attempt to obtain a writing credit for California, who died in 1997. A lack of resources was cited as one of the reasons that Spirit did not file the suit earlier; according to a friend of California's mother, "Nobody had any money, and they thought the statute of limitations was done ... It will be nice if Randy got the credit." If the Spirit lawsuit had been successful, past earnings due to the song—estimated at more than US$550 million—would not have been part of the settlement, but the publisher and composers might have been entitled to a share of future profits.

On 11 April 2016, Los Angeles district judge Gary Klausner ruled that there were enough similarities between the song and the instrumental for a jury to decide the claim, and a trial was scheduled for 10 May. The copyright infringement action was brought by Michael Skidmore, a trustee for the late guitarist, whose legal name was Randy Wolfe. On 23 June, the jury ruled that the similarities between the songs did not amount to copyright infringement. In July, Skidmore's attorney filed a notice of appeal against the court's decision. In March 2017, the verdict was appealed, with a main argument being that the jury should have been able to hear a recorded version of "Taurus". On 28 September 2018, a three-judge panel of the Ninth Circuit allowed the appeal, vacating in part and remanding to the US District Court for the Central District of California for a new trial on several evidentiary and procedural issues. On 10 June 2019, the Ninth Circuit granted rehearing en banc, meaning the case would be reheard by a larger panel of eleven judges.

A Bloomberg Businessweek article shortly after that decision noted that a Ninth Circuit judge's interpretation of the laws implied that key elements of many classic rock songs, including "Stairway to Heaven", that were recorded prior to 1978 were not protected by copyright to begin with. The panel declared that the scope of copyright for those songs is limited to what was included in the deposit copy of the song's sheet music provided to the Copyright Office; at trial Page had testified that the deposit copy included neither the intro that was under dispute nor his guitar solo. Bloomberg reporter Vernon Silver found that the deposit copies of other classic rock songs from that era, such as "Hotel California", "Born to Run" and "Free Bird", include only the song's basic chords, lyrics and melody, without any solos or other distinctive musical touches. Copyright law experts could not say whether those elements are copyrighted or not; Led Zeppelin's lawyers have argued they are even if not included in the deposit copy. Silver made an electronic mashup of several of these elements from different songs and included it with the article.

On 9 March 2020, the United States Court of Appeals for the Ninth Circuit in San Francisco, California, ruled in favour of Led Zeppelin, in that "Stairway to Heaven" does not infringe on the copyright of "Taurus". The full Ninth Circuit used their decision to overturn the controversial "inverse ratio rule" upon which it had relied over the past several decades in past copyright rulings, stating "Because the inverse ratio rule, which is not part of the copyright statute, defies logic, and creates uncertainty for the courts and the parties, we take this opportunity to abrogate the rule in the Ninth Circuit and overrule our prior cases to the contrary." This verdict immediately applied to pending cases within the Ninth: a long battle over Katy Perry's "Dark Horse" in which a jury had found against her for US$2.8 million was overturned a week after the Ninth's verdict in "Stairway to Heaven", in part of the Ninth's new finding and that in the case of "Dark Horse", the similarity argument weighed heavily on the inverse ratio rule. On 5 October, the Supreme Court of the United States denied to grant certiorari to Andes and the trust, leaving the Ninth Circuit's ruling in place in favour of Led Zeppelin. The court's decision precludes further appeals, thus ending the copyright dispute.

== Claims of backmasking ==
"Stairway to Heaven" (section)
The claimed backmasked section

"Stairway to Heaven" (section) (reversed)
The same section reversed

In a January 1982 broadcast of the Trinity Broadcasting Network television program Praise the Lord hosted by Paul Crouch, it was claimed that hidden messages were contained in many popular rock songs through a technique called backmasking. One example of such hidden messages that was prominently cited was in "Stairway to Heaven". The alleged message, which occurs during the middle section of the song ("If there's a bustle in your hedgerow, don't be alarmed now...") when played backward, was purported to contain the Satanic references: "Here's to my sweet Satan / The one whose little path would make me sad whose power is Satan, / He'll give you, he'll give you 666 / There was a little tool shed where he made us suffer, sad Satan."

Following the claims made in the television program, California assemblyman Phil Wyman proposed a state law that would require warning labels on records containing backmasking. In April 1982, the Consumer Protection and Toxic Materials Committee of the California State Assembly held a hearing on backmasking in popular music, during which "Stairway to Heaven" was played backward and self-described "neuroscientific researcher" William Yarroll claimed that the human brain could decipher backward messages.

The band itself has mostly ignored such claims. Swan Song Records responded to the allegations by stating: "Our turntables only play in one direction—forwards." Led Zeppelin audio engineer Eddie Kramer called the allegations "totally and utterly ridiculous. Why would they want to spend so much studio time doing something so dumb?" Robert Plant expressed frustration with the accusations in a 1983 interview in Musician magazine: "To me it's very sad, because 'Stairway to Heaven' was written with every best intention, and as far as reversing tapes and putting messages on the end, that's not my idea of making music."

== Accolades ==
Accolades
Publication	Country	Accolade	Year	Rank
Rock and Roll Hall of Fame	US	"The Rock and Roll Hall of Fame's 500 Songs that Shaped Rock and Roll"	1994	*
Classic Rock	UK	"Ten of the Best Songs Ever!"	1999	1
VH1	US	"The 100 Greatest Rock Songs of All Time"	2000	3
RIAA	US	"Songs of the Century"	2001	53
Grammy Awards	US	"Grammy Hall of Fame Award"	2003	*
Rolling Stone	US	"The 500 Greatest Songs of All Time"	2004	31
Rolling Stone	US	"The 500 Greatest Songs of All Time"	2021	61
Q	UK	"100 Songs That Changed the World"	2003	47
Toby Creswell	Australia	"1001 Songs: the Great Songs of All Time"	2005	*
Q	UK	"100 Greatest Songs of All Time"	2006	8
Guitar World	US	"100 Greatest Guitar Solos"	2006	1
Rolling Stone	US	"100 Greatest Guitar Songs of All Time"	2008	8

(*) designates unordered lists.

== Charts ==
Chart (2007–10)	Peak position
Canadian Billboard Hot Digital Singles Chart	17
EU Billboard Hot 100 Singles Chart	79
Germany (GfK)	15
Irish Singles Chart	24
New Zealand RIANZ Singles Chart	13
Norwegian Singles Chart	5
Portuguese Singles Chart	8
Swedish Singles Chart	57
Swiss Singles Chart	17
UK Singles Chart	37
US Billboard Hot Digital Songs Chart	30
US Billboard Hot Singles Recurrents Chart	16

Note: The official UK Singles Chart incorporated legal downloads as of 17 April 2005.

=== Certifications and sales ===
Region	Certification	Certified units/sales
Denmark (IFPI Danmark)	Platinum	90,000^{‡}
Italy (FIMI) sales since 2009	2× Platinum	100,000^{‡}
New Zealand (RMNZ)	5× Platinum	150,000^{‡}
Spain (Promusicae)	Platinum	60,000^{‡}
United Kingdom (BPI) 2000 release	2× Platinum	1,200,000^{‡}
United States digital sales	—	1,700,000
^{‡} Sales+streaming figures based on certification alone.

== See also ==
- List of cover versions of Led Zeppelin songs § Stairway to Heaven
- List of Led Zeppelin songs written or inspired by others

== Bibliography ==
- Cramer, Alfred William (2009). Musicians and Composers of the 20th Century. Vol. 4. Salem Press. ISBN 978-1-58765-517-3.
- Creswell, Toby (2005). "Stairway to Heaven". 1001 Songs: the Great Songs of All Time (1st ed.). Prahran: Hardie Grant Books. ISBN 978-1-74066-458-5.
- Cross, Charles; Flannigan, Erik (1991). Led Zeppelin: Heaven and Hell, An Illustrated History. New York: Harmony Books. ISBN 0-517-583089.
- Davis, Stephen (2018) [1985]. Hammer of the Gods. London: Pan Books. ISBN 978-1-5098-5252-9.
- Guesdon, Jean-Michel; Margotin, Philippe (2018). Led Zeppelin All the Songs: The Story Behind Every Track. Running Press. ISBN 978-0-316-448-67-3.
- Macan, Edward (1997). Rocking the Classics: English Progressive Rock and the Counterculture. Oxford University Press. ISBN 978-0-19-509887-7.
- Roche, Eric (2004). The Acoustic Guitar Bible. London: SMT/Bobcat Books. ISBN 1-84492-063-1.
- Welch, Chris (2002). Peter Grant: The Man Who Led Zeppelin. Omnibus Press. ISBN 0-7119-9195-2.
