= Led Zeppelin North American Tour Spring 1970 =

1970 concert tour by Led Zeppelin

North America Spring 1970
- Tour by Led Zeppelin
- Poster for Led Zeppelin's concert at Dallas, used to help promote its Spring 1970 tour of North America
- Location: United States; Canada
- Associated album: Led Zeppelin II
- Start date: 21 March 1970
- End date: 18 April 1970
- No. of shows: 28 (29 originally scheduled)

Led Zeppelin concert chronology
- Europe 1970; North America Spring 1970; Iceland, Bath & Germany, Summer 1970

Led Zeppelin's Spring 1970 North American Tour was the fifth concert tour of North America by the English rock band. The tour commenced on 21 March and concluded on 18 April 1970. It took place a little over a week after the conclusion of their recent European concert tour.

== Overview ==
In many respects this tour was a tremendous success for the band, as they grossed a total of over $1,200,000, and broke attendance records at their Canadian concerts in Montreal, Quebec and Vancouver, British Columbia. The band were also made honorary citizens of the city of Memphis.

However, this stint of concerts also featured many unsavoury crowd control problems, with the shows often descending into violent confrontations between young concert-goers and the police. The tour occurred at a time when civil tension was very high in the United States, with numerous demonstrations taking place against the Vietnam War. On occasion Led Zeppelin were refused service in restaurants and in Texas they had a gun pulled on them.

Singer Robert Plant's observations of these disturbing events would prompt him to write some reflective lyrics for the song "That's the Way", which was composed just after the completion of this tour at Bron-Yr-Aur, and was later recorded for the band's forthcoming album Led Zeppelin III.

This was also the fateful tour during which guitarist Jimmy Page's 1960 Gibson Les Paul "Black Beauty" was stolen in an airport in Canada. In 2016, the guitar was returned to Page.

Initially, Stone the Crows were announced as the support act for the tour, but this arrangement was cancelled. During this tour and on all subsequent tours, the band dispensed with using any support bands for their concerts.

The final date of this tour, at Las Vegas, was cancelled as a result of cumulative strain on Plant's voice.

== Tour set list ==
The fairly typical set list for the tour was:

1. "We're Gonna Groove" (King, Bethea)
2. "I Can't Quit You Baby" (Dixon) (Dropped after 25 March)
3. "Dazed and Confused" (Page)
4. "Heartbreaker" (Bonham, Jones Page, Plant)
5. "Bring It On Home" (Page, Plant, Dixon) (Added on 27 March)
6. "White Summer"/"Black Mountain Side" (Page)
7. "Since I've Been Loving You" (Page, Plant, Jones)
8. "Organ Solo"/"Thank You" (Page, Plant, Jones)
9. "What Is and What Should Never Be" (Page, Plant)
10. "Moby Dick" (Page, Jones, Bonham)
11. "How Many More Times" (Page, Plant, Jones, Bonham)

Encores:

- "Whole Lotta Love" (Dixon, Page, Plant, Jones, Bonham)
- "Communication Breakdown" (Page, Jones, Bonham) (On 21 March and 27 March)

There were some set list substitutions, variations, and order switches during the tour.

== Tour dates ==
Date	City	Country	Venue
21 March 1970	Vancouver	Canada	Pacific Coliseum
22 March 1970	Seattle	United States	Seattle Center Arena
23 March 1970	Portland	United States	Memorial Coliseum
25 March 1970	Denver	United States	Denver Coliseum
26 March 1970	Salt Lake City	United States	Salt Palace
27 March 1970	Inglewood	United States	The Forum
28 March 1970	Dallas	United States	Memorial Auditorium
29 March 1970	Houston	United States	Hofheinz Pavilion
30 March 1970	Pittsburgh	United States	Civic Arena
31 March 1970	Philadelphia	United States	The Spectrum
2 April 1970	Charleston	United States	Charleston Civic Center
3 April 1970	Macon	United States	Macon Coliseum
4 April 1970	Indianapolis	United States	Indiana State Fairgrounds Coliseum
5 April 1970	Baltimore	United States	Baltimore Civic Center
7 April 1970	Charlotte	United States	Charlotte Coliseum
8 April 1970	Raleigh	United States	Dorton Auditorium
9 April 1970	Tampa	United States	Curtis Hixon Hall
10 April 1970	Miami Beach	United States	Miami Beach Convention Center
11 April 1970	St. Louis	United States	Kiel Auditorium
12 April 1970	Bloomington	United States	Met Center
13 April 1970	Montreal	Canada	Montreal Forum
14 April 1970	Ottawa	Canada	Ottawa Civic Centre
16 April 1970	Evansville	United States	Roberts Municipal Stadium
17 April 1970	Memphis	United States	Mid-South Coliseum
18 April 1970	Phoenix	United States	Arizona Veterans Memorial Coliseum
~~19 April 1970~~	~~Las Vegas~~	United States	~~Las Vegas Convention Center~~

== Sources ==
- Lewis, Dave and Pallett, Simon (1997) Led Zeppelin: The Concert File, London: Omnibus Press. ISBN 0-7119-5307-4.
