= Rolling Stones Mobile Studio =

Mobile recording studio

The Rolling Stones Mobile Studio (also known as the RSM) is a mobile recording studio inside a DAF F1600 Turbo truck, once owned by the English rock band the Rolling Stones. Numerous bands and artists have recorded music using the RSM, including the Who, Dire Straits, Deep Purple, Lou Reed, Bob Marley, Horslips, Nazareth, Fleetwood Mac, Bad Company, Status Quo, Led Zeppelin, Iron Maiden, Wishbone Ash, Motörhead and the Rolling Stones themselves. Today, the RSM resides at the National Music Centre in Calgary, where it remains a fully operational (though now stationary) recording studio.

== History ==
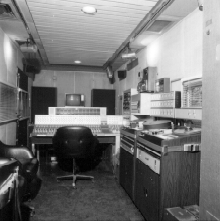

The concept for the Rolling Stones Mobile Studio came about in 1968 when the Rolling Stones, tired of the 9-to-5 limitations of commercial recording studios and being billed for studio time sometimes spent rehearsing or composing, decided to find a way to record at Mick Jagger's new Stargroves country estate. Since recording at this residential location would require all of the necessary recording equipment to be transported to Jagger's house, the band's road manager and pianist Ian Stewart introduced the idea of building a recording studio control room within a truck.

Under Stewart's guidance, a number of top engineers and producers, including Glyn Johns, were consulted in the project's creation, which was then taken to Dick Swettenham's company Helios Electronics. Known for making mixing consoles for some of the most exclusive studios of the time, the company then produced the first working version of the Rolling Stones Mobile Studio.

Originally intended only for use by the Rolling Stones, the RSM soon gained popularity with other rock bands, such as the Who, the Faces and Led Zeppelin. Several classic albums were recorded with the Mobile Studio, including most of Led Zeppelin's Led Zeppelin III (1970) and Led Zeppelin IV (1971), much of The Rolling Stones' Sticky Fingers (1971) and Exile on Main St. (1972), as well as the Stones' 1969 Hyde Park concert. The unit was used in a large variety of locations, everywhere from halls to barns to castles and the casino at Montreux, Switzerland. During the making of the sixth Deep Purple album, Machine Head, the Mobile nearly caught fire as it stood next to the casino, which was set ablaze during a Frank Zappa concert. This incident became the inspiration behind Deep Purple's most famous song, "Smoke on the Water", which mentioned the Mobile in the lyrics ("We all came out to Montreux ... to make records with a mobile") and later referred to the Mobile as the "Rolling truck Stones thing".

In spring 1973, Tapani Tapanainen was hired as the RSM's permanent assistant sound engineer. During the Rolling Stones 1973 European Tour, Mick McKenna joined the RSM and, working with Ian Stewart until his death in 1985, undertook the future development of the mobile studio to suit the changing patterns of work. From 1974 to 1975, the RSM was upgraded significantly. The 16-track recorder was upgraded to a 3M 24-track recorder and 12 new inputs were added to make a total of 32 inputs. Additionally, a large amount of work was done to improve the acoustic sound of the unit.

By the 1980s, the pattern of work had shifted towards more broadcast-oriented products, mostly for major UK clients such as LWT, BBC, Capital Radio, Tyne Tees Television and others. This prompted the inclusion of a synchronizing computer in 1982. This computer enabled audio and video tapes to be run in perfect time, which allowed the Mobile to record a show and then provide finished audio ready for transmission. This feature made it possible to provide the entire sound for several TV series incorporating such artists as Miles Davis, Willie Nelson, Paul Young and the Chieftains.

=== After the Stones ===
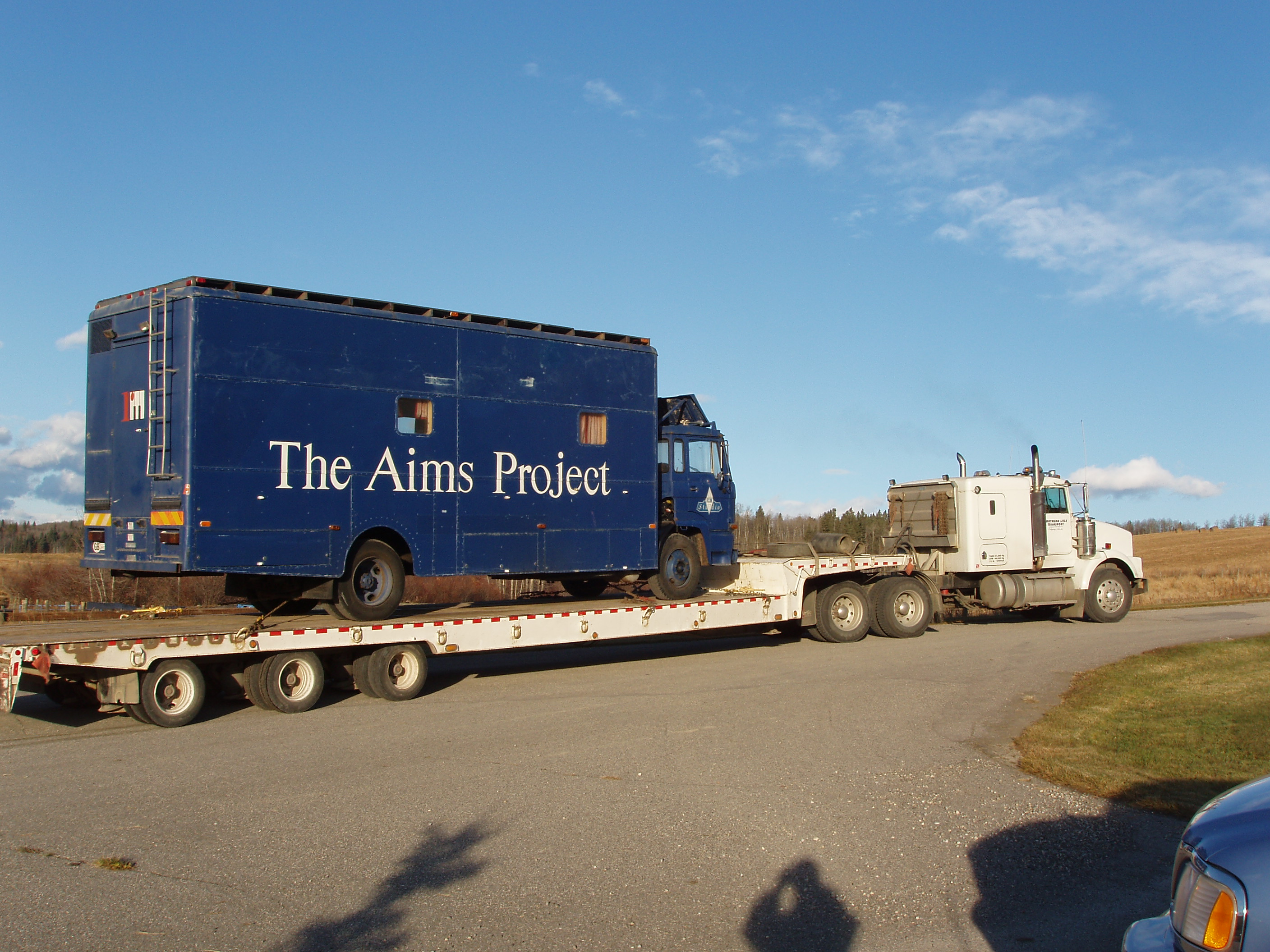
Moving the mobile

In 1985, the Rolling Stones sold the RSM to the band's bassist, Bill Wyman, who, in 1987, created the Ambition Invention Motivation Success (AIMS) project, a chance for new bands around the country to use the mobile studio to produce a top-quality demo. The blue livery and yellow sign writing matched the colours of the project's sponsor, Pernod. Producers Terry Taylor and Mick McKenna worked on about 60 tracks during the course of the project, which culminated with a final show at the Royal Albert Hall in February 1988.

The Mobile was subsequently returned to the commercial marketplace, which had become extremely competitive, both financially and technically. It remained in operation until its closure in April 1993. The last recordings made by it were with Mick's brother Chris Jagger and his band Atcha!, at the unit's base in Pinewood Studios.

In 1996, the Mobile, still in its original form, was sold through auction at Bonham’s and taken to the US by Loho Studios in New York City. After a bit of technical service, it was put into action in the underground music scene in New York, recording such live performances as Patti Smith, the Ramones and nearly 30 other bands at the Continental for the Best of NYC Hardcore album. In 1999, the "final" show of DGeneration, at Coney Island High in the East Village, NYC was recorded from the Mobile by Loho Studios' staff engineer, Greg Di Gesu.

The unit is currently owned by the National Music Centre in Calgary, Alberta, Canada (Cantos Music Collection acquired it in November 2001).

== Notable projects ==
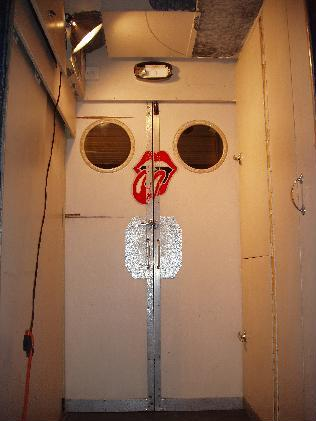
Mobile Studio entrance

=== Singles ===
- "Smoke on the Water" – Deep Purple
- "No Woman, No Cry" – Bob Marley and the Wailers
- "Bring Your Daughter... to the Slaughter" – Iron Maiden

=== Albums ===
- 1970: Led Zeppelin III – Led Zeppelin
- 1971: Sticky Fingers – The Rolling Stones
- 1971: Led Zeppelin IV – Led Zeppelin
- 1971: Who's Next – The Who
- 1972: Machine Head – Deep Purple
- 1972: Exile on Main St. – The Rolling Stones
- 1972: Happy to Meet – Sorry to Part – Horslips
- 1973: Houses of the Holy – Led Zeppelin
- 1973: Live Dates – Wishbone Ash
- 1973: Penguin – Fleetwood Mac
- 1973: Mystery to Me – Fleetwood Mac
- 1973: Recorded Live – Ten Years After
- 1973: Who Do We Think We Are – Deep Purple
- 1974: Burn – Deep Purple
- 1974: Rampant - Nazareth
- 1975: Physical Graffiti – Led Zeppelin
- 1975: Live! – Bob Marley and the Wailers
- 1975: Run with the Pack – Bad Company
- 1977: Live! – Status Quo
- 1977: Moonflower – Santana
- 1979: Life in a Day – Simple Minds
- 1980: Toyah! (live album) - Toyah
- 1981: Rocket 88 – Rocket 88
- 1983: Alchemy: Dire Straits Live – Dire Straits
- 1985: A Physical Presence – Level 42
- 1985: Live After Death – Iron Maiden
- 1986: Just in Time – Buddy Rich
- 1990: No Prayer for the Dying – Iron Maiden
