= Headley Grange =

Grade II listed building in Hampshire, England

- Location within Hampshire
- 51°06′50″N 0°49′16″W
- Type: Workhouse
- Location: Headley
- OS grid reference: SU 82610 35626

History
- Built: 1795

Site notes
- Area: Hampshire

Listed Building – Grade II
- Official name: Headley Grange
- Designated: 15 August 1985
- Reference no.: 1339007

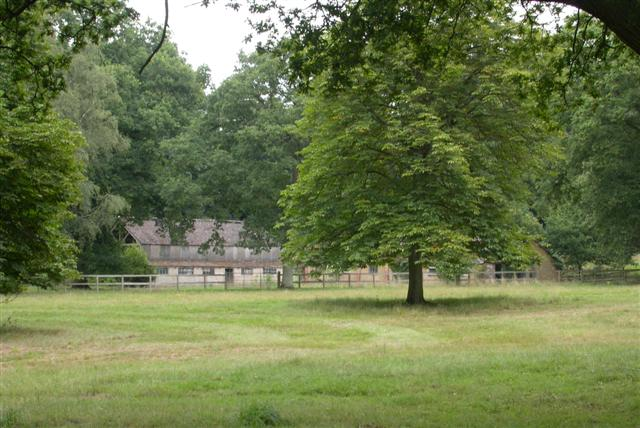
Barn in the grounds at Headley Grange

Headley Grange is a former workhouse in Headley, Hampshire, England. It is a Grade II listed historic building. It is best known for its use as a recording and rehearsal venue in the 1960s and 1970s, by acts including Led Zeppelin, Genesis, Bad Company and Help Yourself.

== Early history ==
Built in 1795, Headley Grange is a three-storey stone structure which was originally used as a workhouse for the poor, infirm, and orphaned. It was built for the poor of three parishes: Bramshott, Headley and Kingsley. It was the centre of a riot in 1830. The building was bought in 1870 by builder Thomas Kemp for £420; he converted it into a private residence, and named it Headley Grange.

== Use as a recording and rehearsal studio ==
Parts of Led Zeppelin's albums Led Zeppelin III, Led Zeppelin IV, Houses of the Holy and Physical Graffiti were composed and/or recorded at Headley Grange. Led Zeppelin vocalist Robert Plant wrote most of the lyrics to Led Zeppelin's "Stairway to Heaven" there in a single day. The Led Zeppelin song "Black Dog", which, like "Stairway", appeared on Led Zeppelin IV, was named after a black Labrador Retriever which was found hanging around Headley Grange during recording.

According to Led Zeppelin guitarist Jimmy Page:

Headley Grange was somewhat rundown; the heating didn't work. But it had one major advantage. Other bands had rehearsed there and hadn't had any complaints. That's a major issue, because you don't want to go somewhere and start locking into the work process and then have to pull out.

In an interview he gave to Mojo magazine in 2010, Page elaborated:

The reason we went there in the first place was to have a live-in situation where you're writing and really living the music. We'd never really had that experience before as a group, apart from when Robert [Plant] and I had gone to Bron-Yr-Aur. But that was just me and Robert going down there and hanging out in the bosom of Wales and enjoying it. This was different. It was all of us really concentrating in a concentrated environment and the essence of what happened there manifested itself across three albums (IV, Houses of the Holy, Physical Graffiti).

Help Yourself lived at The Grange from 1971 to 1973 and rehearsed for both their Beware The Shadow and Strange Affair albums whilst in residence.

Peter Gabriel and other Genesis members have acknowledged writing much of the material for their 1974 concept album The Lamb Lies Down on Broadway at the retreat.

== Depiction in It Might Get Loud ==
In the 2009 documentary It Might Get Loud, Page is filmed visiting Headley Grange and discussing the recording of Led Zeppelin IV there. He discussed how the drums for "When the Levee Breaks" were recorded in the cavernous hallway, with its reverberant acoustics.

He later recalled of this visit:

[My] memories of it were still very much as it was when we'd played there originally. It wasn't really being used back then, but the same family still own it. The lady who rented it to [Led Zeppelin] I think had passed on, but I think her granddaughter lives there now. My memories of it were really as it was in those old days with the heating not working and it being very damp, but it was still the scene of some very high-energy playing ... [In the film] I was quite overwhelmed when I went in, not only because of the past but also because now it was a house and I was poking around in a house that was a home. There was furniture, ornaments, pictures and even some musical instruments ... [T]he dimensions of the hall were still as I remembered it. I also went into the other rooms, including the room I slept in and where the fire was where we used to keep warm and it was quite overwhelming.
