= For Badgeholders Only =

Bootleg album featuring Led Zeppelin

Live album by Led Zeppelin
- Recorded: June 23, 1977
- Venues: Los Angeles Forum, Inglewood, California
- Label: Dragonfly Records

Part 2

For Badgeholders Only is a bootleg recording of a rock concert by English band Led Zeppelin, performed on June 23, 1977 at the Los Angeles Forum in Los Angeles, California, a show which came towards the end of the band's 1977 North American concert tour.

== Overview ==
When it first appeared, this release was notable not only for the band's strong performance and superb sound quality recording, but also for the surprise guest, Keith Moon from The Who. Moon plays throughout the nearly 20 minute drum solo and returns later for the encores.

This concert occurred just two days after the equally famous June 21, 1977 show, with that concert having been immortalised on the bootleg Listen to This Eddie. However, whereas the "Eddie" bootleg featured a recording made by audience member Mike Millard, the recording that appeared on the original "For Badgeholders Only" vinyl bootleg was the work of another audience member named Jon Wizardo, which was not known for many years until the release of the bootleg's master tapes in 2023. Millard did make his own recording of the June 23rd concert, but his tape did not appear until years later, when it was released on other bootlegs of the show. As with all bootlegs that have been made of Led Zeppelin concerts, these recordings were done in secret, and were issued illegally on vinyl and CD without the permission of the band.

The original vinyl issue of "For Badgeholders Only" was released on two separate double-LP releases, with the songs from the concert featured out-of-sequence, spread out over the two sets. The first release was simply titled "For Badgeholders Only", and came packaged in a plastic-wrapped sleeve, with a photocopied insert featuring a live shot of Page and a matrix number of "LZ 1234". "For Badgeholders Only (Part 2)", featured a picture of Plant and a matrix number of "LZ 7", and the remaining songs from the show, save for "The Song Remains the Same", which was not featured on either release. The labels on the records themselves all bore the same logo of a picture of a dragonfly on one side, and the words "Dragonfly Records" on the other. Later pressings of the album bore alternate labels on the records themselves, such as "Ruthless Rhymes", while still using the same covers.

As has since been revealed in recent years, it turns out that there were actually multiple tapers in the audience who were able to record the "Badgeholders" show. However, it appears that none of them were able to capture the entire concert without missing sections of music, or entire songs altogether. The release of Jon Wizardo's original recording master tapes reveals that he managed to fully tape the entire concert but elected to omit "The Song Remains The Same" from the original "Badgeholders" vinyl releases presumably due to numerous equipment errors audible on his original master recordings. Because of this, collectors and bootleg labels alike have taken it upon themselves to compile the best parts from the numerous sources, so as to create a seamless listening experience of the complete concert.

Given the potentially limitless possibilities in mixing the multiple sources, as well as the good sound quality that most of them share, this concert has been released on bootleg many times. In most cases, the bootlegs have used the same "For Badgeholders Only" name as the title, even though the content on the release may be different from other releases that use the same name. Some bootleg labels have opted to use different names for the show, with one such release having been titled "Sgt. Page's Badgeholders Club Band", being a play on both the "For Badgeholders Only" moniker, as well as the Beatles' album Sgt Pepper's Lonely Hearts Club Band. That bootleg release has since been discovered to have been directly copied from an existing fan-made compilation, made years before, entitled "Zeppelin Digital Volume 3".

== Album title ==
The title For Badgeholders Only most likely comes from Robert Plant's numerous references to "badgeholders" (a band/crew slang term for a groupie derived from the special badges reserved for that contingent) throughout the concert. For example, before performing "Trampled Under Foot", Plant asks "Is there anybody on the spotlights who could find us a badgeholder?"

== Set list of the complete concert ==
No.	Title	Writer(s)	Length
1.	"The Song Remains the Same"	Page, Plant	7:11
2.	"Sick Again (with The Rover intro segment)"	Page, Plant	6:05
3.	"Nobody's Fault but Mine"	Page, Plant	7:08
4.	"Over the Hills and Far Away"	Page, Plant	7:13
5.	"Since I've Been Loving You"	Page, Plant, Jones	9:36
6.	"No Quarter"	Page, Plant, Jones	31:11
7.	"Ten Years Gone"	Page, Plant	10:51
8.	"The Battle of Evermore"	Page, Plant	7:15
9.	"Going to California"	Page, Plant	6:29
10.	"Black Country Woman"	Page, Plant	2:25
11.	"Bron-Yr-Aur (Stomp)"	Page, Plant, Jones	7:06
12.	"White Summer"/"Black Mountain Side"	Page	8:54
13.	"Kashmir"	Page, Plant, Bonham	9:45
14.	"Trampled Under Foot"	Page, Plant, Jones	8:07
15.	"Out on the Tiles" / "Over the Top"/"Moby Dick (featuring Keith Moon)"	Page, Plant, Jones, Bonham	19:11
16.	"Jimmy Page Guitar Solo (interpolates "The Star-Spangled Banner")"	Page	15:40
17.	"Achilles Last Stand"	Page, Plant	9:51
18.	"Stairway to Heaven"	Page, Plant	12:00
19.	"Whole Lotta Love (featuring Keith Moon)"	Page, Plant, Jones, Bonham, Dixon	2:30
20.	"Rock and Roll (featuring Keith Moon)"	Page, Plant, Jones, Bonham	4:17

Some bootlegs state that "The Rover" is the second song on the track listing, though the song was only played as a segue between "The Song Remains the Same" and "Sick Again". Some bootleggers have been known to put the song in the track listing and state "Whole Lotta Love" and "Rock and Roll" as one song, but this is misleading and only results in an improperly labeled track listing.

== See also ==
- Led Zeppelin bootleg recordings
