= Destroyer (Led Zeppelin bootleg recording) =

1977 bootleg recording

One of the photos bootleggers have used for this album's cover. Due to the nature of bootlegging, there is usually no consensus on covers.

Another common album cover

Destroyer is a bootleg recording from the English rock group Led Zeppelin’s performance at Richfield Coliseum, Cleveland, Ohio, on 27 April 1977. The soundboard recording is from the first show of two nights at the venue, which were part of the band’s 1977 North American Tour. The album is technically titled simply Destroyer.

Initial vinyl pressings of the bootleg incorrectly credited Seattle, Washington, as the location of this show. A limited edition of the four-LP set came in a plastic film reel carrying case bearing the legend "recorded June 24 'LED ZEPPELIN DESTROYER Unique Permanent Zeppelin Storage Case.'" The liner notes thanked John Bonham for letting the bootleg producers use the tape, and some songs were marred by the random splicing into them of segments from other songs.

The later three-CD sets fixed these errors, and eventually versions remastered from lower-generation source tapes surfaced. The exceptional sound quality throughout the performance is described by some sources as "almost perfect". It was the first, and for many years the only, professionally recorded mixing desk tape to escape from the band's possession.

The bootleg should not be confused with an audience recording from the following night in Cleveland, sometimes entitled The Destroyer. Though marred by poorer sound quality, and incomplete as a result of using 60-minute (instead of the longer 90-minute) cassette tapes for the recording, many critics consider this second performance better than the more famous first Destroyer gig.

== Set list ==
1. ‘‘The Song Remains the Same’ – (3:40) (fades in)
2. ‘‘The Rover’(Intro)/‘Sick Again’ – (6:44)
3. ‘Nobody's Fault But Mine’ – (6:29)
4. ‘In My Time of Dying’/ ‘You Shook Me’ – (11:38)
5. ‘Since I've Been Loving You’ – (8:23)
6. ‘No Quarter’ – (19:46) (cut)
7. ‘Ten Years Gone’ – (9:14)
8. ‘The Battle Of Evermore’ – (6:22)
9. ‘Going To California’ – (5:48)
10. ‘Black Country Woman’
11. ‘‘Bron-Yr-Aur Stomp’ – (5:11)
12. ‘White Summer’/‘Black Mountain Side’ (cut) *
13. ‘‘Kashmir’ – (8:32)
14. ‘‘Out on the Tiles’ (intro)/‘Over The Top (not a song title) ‘Moby Dick’
15. ‘Guitar Solo’ – (9:45) (cut)
  - ‘Bowed Electric Guitar Solo and Theremin Solo’
  - ‘Star Spangled Banner’
  - ‘Guitar’
  - ‘Cello Bow Solo’
  - ‘Effects Solo’
16. ‘Achilles Last Stand’ – (9:40)
17. ‘Stairway To Heaven’ – (10:10)
18. ‘‘Rock And Roll’ – (3:26) (fades in)
19. ‘Trampled Under Foot’
- Black Mountain Side is on two CD tracks on several CD issues (because of the cut in the original tape). There is loss off about one second in the middle.

== See also ==
- Led Zeppelin bootleg recordings
