= Led Zeppelin North American Tour 1972 =

1972 concert tour by Led Zeppelin

North America 1972
- Tour by Led Zeppelin
- Poster for Led Zeppelin's concerts at San Diego, used to help promote its 1972 North American tour
- Location: United States; Canada
- Associated album: Led Zeppelin IV
- Start date: 27 May 1972
- End date: 28 June 1972
- No. of shows: 21 (including two European warm-up shows)

Led Zeppelin concert chronology
- Australasia 1972; North America 1972; Japan 1972

Led Zeppelin's 1972 North American Tour was the eighth concert tour of North America by the English rock band. The tour was divided into two legs with performances commencing on 27 May and concluding on 28 June 1972. It included two warm-up shows in Europe.

== History ==
Guitarist Jimmy Page considers Led Zeppelin at this point to have been at their artistic peak. However, despite selling out their concerts, the tour had the lowest profile of all of the band's eleven North American concert tours, being vastly overshadowed by the Rolling Stones' tour of the same period, much to the annoyance of Led Zeppelin. In order to prevent this from happening again, the band's manager, Peter Grant, decided to hire PR consultants to help promote subsequent tours.

During this concert stint the band stopped at New York City to mix tracks that had been recorded at Olympic Studios in London the previous month, for their forthcoming fifth album.

According to Led Zeppelin archivists Dave Lewis and Simon Pallett, it was at around this period in time that Grant began to implement the unprecedented policy of asking concert promoters for 90% of all gate receipts:

The group's stature was such that he was able to pull off this major swing with little resistance from the agents and promoters. Any deal with Led Zeppelin was better than no deal at all, they decided. As a consequence Led Zeppelin's fortune began to pile up at an even faster rate [than before].

For this tour, and all of Led Zeppelin's subsequent American tours, the band hired Dallas-based company Showco to provide its lighting and sound.

== Recordings ==
Like many other Led Zeppelin concert tours, several of the concerts performed by the band on this tour were recorded by fans as unofficial bootlegs. Some of these were subsequently released on bootleg titles such as Burn Like a Candle. Two of the concerts from this tour, at the L.A. Forum on 25 June and the Long Beach Arena on 27 June respectively, were professionally recorded by Eddie Kramer for a potential live release. These recordings were remastered by Page and officially released on the album How the West Was Won in 2003 and was later reissued in 2018.

No official live footage of the band was filmed during this tour. In an interview Page gave to The Times newspaper in 2010, when asked which performances from Led Zeppelin's career stand out to him now, he made reference to the tour but acknowledged the lack of visual recordings:

I think what we did on ... How the West was Won — that 1972 gig — is pretty much a testament of how good it was. It would have been nice to have had a little more visual recordings, but there you go. That's the conundrum of Led Zeppelin!

== Tour set list ==
This was the first tour in which Led Zeppelin used songs from their upcoming album Houses of the Holy ("Over the Hills and Far Away", "Dancing Days", and "The Ocean"). This was also the last concert tour on which Led Zeppelin included an acoustic section until it was revived in 1975 for their Earls Court performances. John Bonham sang co-lead vocals with Robert Plant during the song "Bron-Y-Aur Stomp". The decision to drop the acoustic set was perhaps made because their live concerts were regularly extending into three hour long marathons (and sometimes up to four and a half hours), which were becoming taxing on all four band members.

The fairly typical set list for the tour was:

1. "LA Drone" (Page, Jones) (15 June to 28 June)
2. "Immigrant Song" (Page, Plant)
3. "Heartbreaker" (Bonham, Page, Plant)
4. "Celebration Day" (Page, Plant, Jones) (on 27 May and 9 June only)
5. "Out on the Tiles" (intro) (Page, Plant, Bonham) / "Black Dog" (Page, Plant, Jones)
6. "Over the Hills and Far Away" (Page, Plant) (only on 19, 25, 27, and 28 June)
7. "Since I've Been Loving You" (Page, Plant, Jones)
8. "Stairway to Heaven" (Page, Plant)
9. "Going to California" (Page, Plant)
10. "Black Country Woman" (Page, Plant) (only on 19 June)
11. "That's the Way" (Page, Plant)
12. "Tangerine" (Page)
13. "Bron-Y-Aur Stomp" (Page, Plant, Jones)
14. "Dazed and Confused" (Page)
15. "What Is and What Should Never Be" (Page, Plant)
16. "Dancing Days" (Page, Plant) (only on 19 June, 25 June, 27 June, and 28 June)
17. "Moby Dick" (Bonham)
18. "Whole Lotta Love" (Bonham, Dixon, Jones, Page, Plant)

Encores (variations of the following list):

- "Rock and Roll" (Page, Plant, Jones, Bonham)
- "The Ocean" (Bonham, Jones, Page, Plant) (On 10 June, 19 June, 21 June, and 25 June)
- "Louie Louie" (Berry) (On 19 June, 21 June, and 25 June)
- "Thank You" (Page, Plant) (On 7 June, 19 June, 21 June, and 25 June)
- "Communication Breakdown" (Bonham, Jones, Page) (On 9 June, 11 June, 14 June, and 25 June)
- "Bring It On Home" (Dixon, Page, Plant) (On 13 June, 14 June, and 25 June)
- "Money (That's What I Want)" (Bradford, Gordie) (only on 19 June)
- "Weekend" (Post) (On 14 June)

== Tour dates ==
Date	City	Country	Venue
European warm-up shows
27 May 1972	Amsterdam	Netherlands	Oude Rai
28 May 1972	Brussels	Belgium	Forest National
North America
6 June 1972	Detroit	United States	Cobo Hall
7 June 1972	Montreal	Canada	Montreal Forum
9 June 1972	Charlotte	United States	Charlotte Coliseum
10 June 1972	Buffalo	United States	Buffalo Memorial Auditorium
11 June 1972	Baltimore	United States	Baltimore Civic Center
13 June 1972	Philadelphia	United States	The Spectrum
14 June 1972	New York	United States	Nassau Coliseum
15 June 1972	New York	United States	Nassau Coliseum
17 June 1972	Portland	United States	Memorial Coliseum
18 June 1972	Seattle	United States	Seattle Center Coliseum
19 June 1972	Seattle	United States	Seattle Center Coliseum
21 June 1972	Denver	United States	Denver Coliseum
22 June 1972	San Bernardino	United States	Swing Auditorium
23 June 1972	San Diego	United States	San Diego Sports Arena
25 June 1972	Inglewood (Los Angeles)	United States	The Forum
27 June 1972	Long Beach	United States	Long Beach Arena
28 June 1972	Tucson	United States	Tucson Community Center

Note: The 18 June show was moved to Seattle from the planned location in Vancouver at the last minute due to fans rioting.
