= The Best of Led Zeppelin =

1999–2000 greatest hits album series by Led Zeppelin

Greatest hits album series by Led Zeppelin
- Released: Early Days: 22 November 1999; Latter Days: 21 March 2000; Box set: 19 November 2002 (US)
- Recorded: October 1968 – December 1978
- Genre: Hard rock, blues rock, folk rock, heavy metal
- Length: Early Days: 1:08:09; Latter Days: 1:06:36; Box set: 2:14:54
- Label: Atlantic
- Producer: Jimmy Page

Led Zeppelin chronology
BBC Sessions (1997)	The Best of Led Zeppelin (1999–2000)	Led Zeppelin DVD (2003)

Early Days: Vol. 1

Latter Days: Vol. 2

Professional ratings
Review scores
Source	Rating
Allmusic	4/5 stars
The Encyclopedia of Popular Music	4/5 stars
Sputnikmusic	2/5 stars

The Best of Led Zeppelin is a two-volume best-of compilation album series by the English rock group Led Zeppelin; containing selections from all of the band's studio albums it was released by Atlantic Records. Volume one, Early Days was released on November 22, 1999; volume two, Latter Days, was released on March 21, 2000. Early Days is composed of tracks from the period in the band's history dating 1968 to 1971 and does not use a traditional "greatest hits" format as Led Zeppelin largely avoided single releases. (The band never had a Billboard No. 1 single.) Latter Days covered 1973 to 1979. Early Days debuted at #71 on the Billboard's Pop Albums chart and Latter Days debuted at #81. A combined disc set, called Early Days and Latter Days, was released on November 19, 2002 in the United States and on February 24, 2003 in the United Kingdom. Both Early Days and Early Days and Latter Days were certified platinum by the Recording Industry Association of America.

Both volumes are now out of print, and were replaced with the 2007 two-disc compilation Mothership.

== Early Days ==
=== Track listing ===
Side one
No.	Title	Writer(s)	Original album	Length
1.	"Good Times Bad Times"	John Bonham, John Paul Jones, Jimmy Page	Led Zeppelin, 1969	2:48
2.	"Babe I'm Gonna Leave You"	Anne Bredon, Page, Robert Plant	Led Zeppelin	6:41
3.	"Dazed and Confused"	Page; inspired by Jake Holmes	Led Zeppelin	6:27
Total length:				15:57

Side two
No.	Title	Writer(s)	Original album	Length
1.	"Communication Breakdown"	Bonham, Jones, Page	Led Zeppelin	2:29
2.	"Whole Lotta Love"	Bonham, Willie Dixon, Jones, Page, Plant	Led Zeppelin II, 1969	5:34
3.	"What Is and What Should Never Be"	Page, Plant	Led Zeppelin II	4:44
4.	"Immigrant Song"	Page, Plant	Led Zeppelin III, 1970	2:25
Total length:				15:17

Side three
No.	Title	Writer(s)	Original album	Length
1.	"Since I've Been Loving You"	Jones, Page, Plant	Led Zeppelin III	7:24
2.	"Black Dog"	Jones, Page, Plant	Led Zeppelin IV, 1971	4:54
3.	"Rock and Roll"	Bonham, Jones, Page, Plant	Led Zeppelin IV	3:41
Total length:				16:00

Side four
No.	Title	Writer(s)	Original album	Length
1.	"The Battle of Evermore"	Page, Plant	Led Zeppelin IV	5:52
2.	"When the Levee Breaks"	Bonham, Jones, Memphis Minnie, Page, Plant	Led Zeppelin IV	7:08
3.	"Stairway to Heaven"	Page, Plant	Led Zeppelin IV	8:02
Total length:				21:03

This enhanced CD contains 1969 television footage from Sweden of the band miming to "Communication Breakdown".

=== Charts ===
==== Weekly charts ====
1999–2000 weekly chart performance for Early Days – The Best of Led Zeppelin Volume One
Chart (1999–2000)	Peak position
Austrian Albums (Ö3 Austria)	23
Finnish Albums (Suomen virallinen lista)	28
German Albums (Offizielle Top 100)	71
Scottish Albums (OCC)	90
Swedish Albums (Sverigetopplistan)	4
Swiss Albums (Schweizer Hitparade)	84
UK Albums (OCC)	55
UK Rock & Metal Albums (OCC)	3
US Billboard 200	71

==== Year-end charts ====
2002 year-end chart performance for Early Days – The Best of Led Zeppelin Volume One
Chart (2002)	Position
Canadian Metal Albums (Nielsen SoundScan)	61

=== Certifications ===
Certifications for Early Days – The Best of Led Zeppelin Volume One
Region	Certification	Certified units/sales
Canada (Music Canada)	Gold	50,000^{^}
United Kingdom (BPI)	Silver	60,000^{^}
United States (RIAA)	Platinum	1,000,000^{^}
^{^} Shipments figures based on certification alone.

== Latter Days ==
=== Track listing ===
Side one
No.	Title	Writer(s)	Original album	Length
1.	"The Song Remains the Same"	Page and Plant	Houses of the Holy, 1973	5:28
2.	"No Quarter"	Jones, Page, and Plant	Houses of the Holy	6:59
3.	"Houses of the Holy"	Page and Plant	Physical Graffiti, 1975	4:01
Total length:				16:36

Side two
No.	Title	Writer(s)	Original album	Length
1.	"Trampled Under Foot"	Jones, Page, and Plant	Physical Graffiti	5:35
2.	"Kashmir"	Bonham, Page, and Plant	Physical Graffiti	8:33
Total length:				14:14

Side three
No.	Title	Writer(s)	Original album	Length
1.	"Ten Years Gone"	Page and Plant	Physical Graffiti	6:31
2.	"Achilles Last Stand"	Page and Plant	Presence, 1976	10:22
Total length:				17:06

Side four
No.	Title	Writer(s)	Original album	Length
1.	"Nobody's Fault but Mine"	Page and Plant	Presence	6:27
2.	"All My Love"	Jones and Plant	In Through the Out Door, 1979	5:53
3.	"In the Evening"	Jones, Page, and Plant	In Through the Out Door	6:49
Total length:				19:15

This enhanced CD contains a video of a live performance of "Kashmir" from Earls Court in 1975 matched to the studio track.

=== Charts ===
2000 weekly chart performance for Latter Days – The Best Of Led Zeppelin Volume Two
Chart (2000)	Peak position
UK Albums (OCC)	40
US Billboard 200	81

== Box set ==
=== Appearance ===
The sleeve that holds the two CDs is made of cardstock. The cover of the sleeve is mainly occupied by the same photo from the cover of Early Days. It features the members of Led Zeppelin in late Apollo mission astronaut suits in front of a starry background and a Led Zeppelin logo. The logo behind them shows many space-related images, but the only one wholly visible is the image of the moon's face with a space capsule stuck in its eye taken from the early silent movie A Trip to the Moon.

On the back of the sleeve is an array of information split up into two columns. On the left column, there is a photograph of the cover of Latter Days. It features the same astronaut suits, but the photos were taken later and so the members of Led Zeppelin are older. In the logo is an image of Saturn and behind all of the foreground is an image of Earth taken from space. Below that is the information about Atlantic. On the right column is a synopsis of the tracks on both discs.

==== Early Days disc ====
Early Days is packaged in a plastic jewel compact disc case. Much of the background is a drawing of stars, yet inside the case and behind the CD is an image of an artist's rendition of a supernova, apparently airbrushed. On the backside of the case is a list of the tracks. The background of the back cover appears to be a slightly out-of-focus photograph, likely taken by an amateur photographer.

The Early Days liner notes begin with the cover. On the cover is the same image that appears on the foreground of the sleeve. Inside the booklet is first a summary of the tracks, and then photos of the band ranging from 1969 to 1972. Then after that is a list of their albums, and the back page is a list of the band members, design and artwork credits, and information about the Enhanced CD capabilities on Early Days.

==== Latter Days disc ====
The packaging for Latter Days mirrors that of Early Days. The four band members are pictured in the same Apollo space suits in the same order, but they are older. Much of the background is of Earth as viewed from orbit. There is a picture of Saturn in place of the picture of the moon with the ship in its eye. Behind the CD is an image of the Eagle Nebula.

The liner notes are just like those of Early Days, except for the fact that the images range from the years 1973 to 1979.

=== Enhanced CD ===
Both the Early Days CD and the Latter Days CD are enhanced so they can play extra content on a computer. On Early Days, a music video of the song "Communication Breakdown" is included. On Latter Days, a video of the song "Kashmir" is included.

=== Charts ===
2002 weekly chart performance for Early Days and Latter Days
Chart (2002–2003)	Peak position
Finnish Albums (Suomen virallinen lista)	40
German Albums (Offizielle Top 100)	96
Italian Albums (FIMI)	22
New Zealand Albums (RMNZ)	17
UK Albums (OCC)	11
UK Rock & Metal Albums (OCC)	2
US Billboard 200	114

=== Certifications ===
Region	Certification	Certified units/sales
United Kingdom (BPI)	Platinum	300,000^{^}
United States (RIAA)	Platinum	1,000,000^{^}
^{^} Shipments figures based on certification alone.

== Personnel ==
Led Zeppelin

- John Bonham – drums, percussion
- John Paul Jones – bass guitar, keyboards, acoustic guitar, recorders
- Jimmy Page – electric and acoustic guitars, mandolin, production
- Robert Plant – vocals, harmonica

Additional musicians

- Sandy Denny – vocals on "The Battle of Evermore"
- Ian Stewart – piano on "Rock and Roll"
