= Led Zeppelin North American Tour 1977 =

1977 concert tour by Led Zeppelin

North American Tour 1977
- Tour by Led Zeppelin
- Location: United States
- Associated album: Presence
- Start date: 1 April 1977
- End date: 24 July 1977
- Legs: 3
- No. of shows: 44 (51 scheduled)

Led Zeppelin concert chronology
- Earls Court 1975; North America 1977; Knebworth Festival 1979

Led Zeppelin's 1977 North American Tour was the eleventh and final concert tour of North America by the English rock band. The tour was divided into three legs, with performances commencing on 1 April and concluding on 24 July 1977. The tour was originally intended to finish on 13 August, but was cut short following the death of Robert Plant's son, Karac.

== Overview ==
This was the first tour embarked on by the band following their enforced lay-off caused by Plant's car accident in Greece in 1975. During this sabbatical, the band had recorded their seventh studio album, Presence. Rehearsals for the tour eventually took place at Manticore Studios, Fulham in early 1977, where the band worked for two months on a new set list.

Led Zeppelin's manager Peter Grant conceived this series of concerts as an effort that would reassert Led Zeppelin as the dominant band of the decade. Fifty-one concerts were scheduled over a three-leg period, for 1.3 million ticket holders. It was Led Zeppelin's biggest ever tour, and tickets sold at a rate of 72,000 a day.

The tour was scheduled to commence on 27 February at Fort Worth, Texas, but Plant contracted laryngitis and the schedule was postponed for a month. It eventually kicked off on 1 April, at the Dallas Memorial Auditorium in Dallas. The delay reduced the amount of time the band had available to rehearse, since all their equipment had already been airlifted to the United States. As guitarist Jimmy Page explained:

We didn't have any instruments for a month. All the equipment was shipped over there five days before we were due to go. I didn't play a guitar for a month. I was terrified at the prospect of the first few shows.

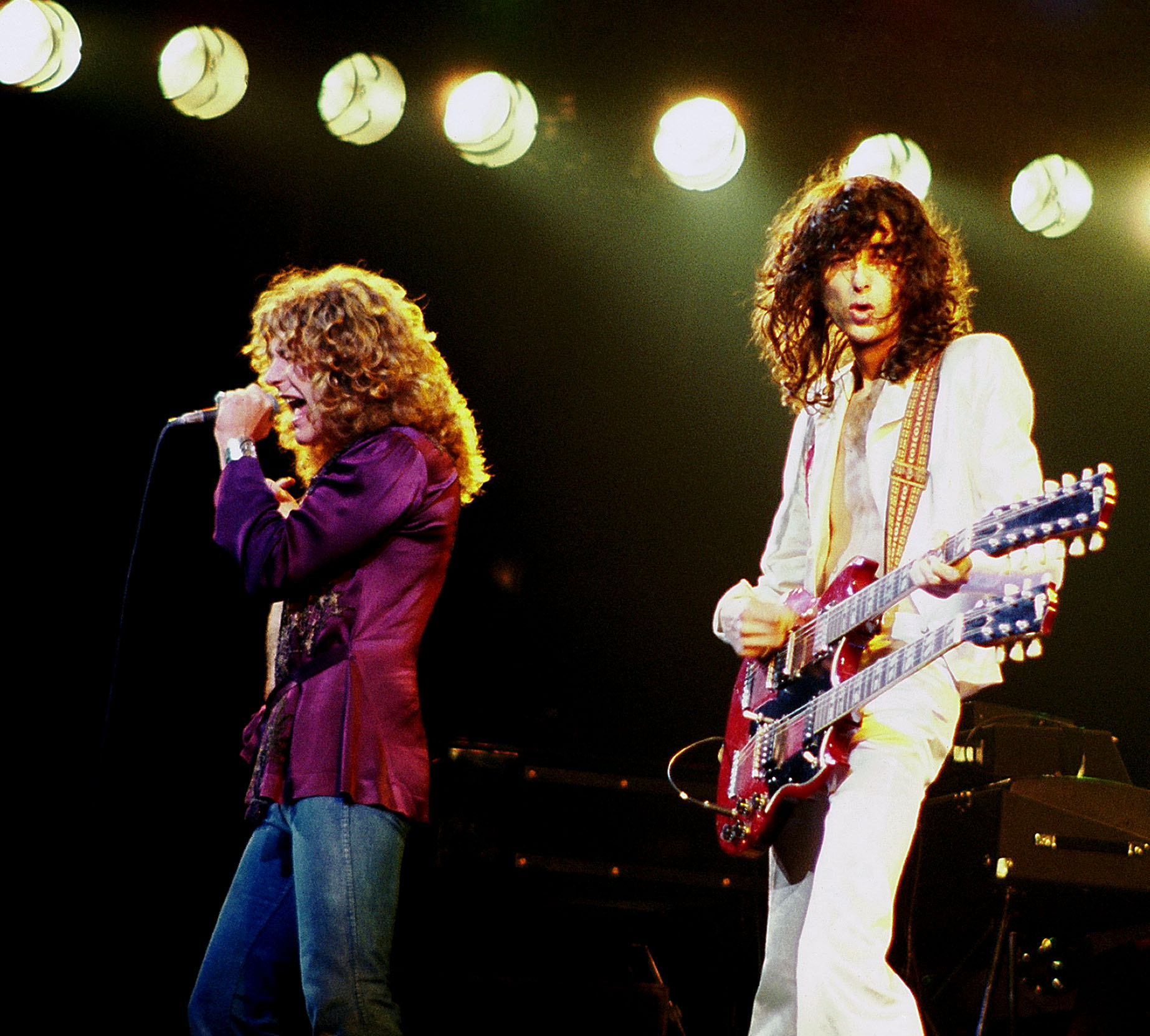
Page (right) and Plant (left) on stage during the 1977 North American Tour at Chicago Stadium on April 10, 1977, performing "Stairway to Heaven".

Led Zeppelin's 1977 North American Tour was a massive financial success, as the band sold out large arenas and stadiums. On 30 April they performed to 76,229 people at the Pontiac Silverdome, a new world record attendance for a solo indoor attraction, beating the 75,962 that The Who attracted there on 6 December 1975 for Opening Night, and grossed $792,361.50 (also a record breaker). Lengthy stints were spent in New York City and Los Angeles, where the band performed six sold-out shows each at Madison Square Garden and the Los Angeles Forum. In New York, the band did not advertise the concerts, relying solely on street demand to sell out the shows; enough ticket applications were received to sell out a further two nights had time permitted.

Dave Lewis, an expert on the band, considers that this tour,

with its staggered itinerary and massive arena and stadium venues, became the blueprint for which the likes of Bruce Springsteen and U2 would base their multimillion-dollar tours during the Eighties and Nineties. Back then, though, Grant and Zeppelin were making their own rules as they went along. The unwieldy scale of just how big the Zeppelin experience had become was encapsulated over those forty-four 1977 shows.

For the tour, the band chartered Caesar's Chariot, a 45-seat Boeing 707 owned by the Caesars Palace Hotel in Las Vegas, to shuttle them between cities. This plane should not be confused with the more famous Starship, which had been used by the band on its previous two concert stints in North America, but which was permanently grounded in 1977 due to engine problems. The set list played on this tour included an acoustic section, which had originally been revived by the band at their previous concerts at Earls Court Arena in 1975 and was retained for the 1977 concerts due to the lingering effects of Plant's injuries. Technically, only two songs from their most recent album, Presence (1976), were performed: "Nobody's Fault but Mine" and "Achilles Last Stand", although parts of the solo from "Tea for One" would be incorporated by Page during the solo of "Since I've Been Loving You".

For many of the concerts on this tour, Jimmy Page chose to wear a striking custom-made white silk dragon suit known as the "Poppy White Dragon Suit", as is captured in several famous photographs of the band. It was also on this tour that John Paul Jones introduced a custom triple-necked acoustic instrument which contained a mandolin, twelve-string guitar and six-string guitar. He used this instrument on "Ten Years Gone" and the acoustic portion of the setlist.

Keith Moon sat in with the band on 23 June 1977, at the Los Angeles Forum.

== Problems experienced ==
Though profitable financially, the tour was beset with difficulties. On 19 April, over 70 people were arrested as about 1,000 ticketless fans tried to gatecrash Cincinnati Riverfront Coliseum for two sold out festival seating/general admission concerts, while some gained entry by throwing rocks and beer bottles through glass entrance doors and some wall height, all-glass panes surrounding the outermost perimeter of the arena. On 3 June, after an open-air concert at Tampa Stadium was cut short because of a severe thunderstorm, a riot broke out in the audience, resulting in 19 arrests and 50 fans being injured. Police ultimately resorted to using tear gas to break up the crowd.

Guitarist Jimmy Page's ongoing heroin addiction also caused him to lose a noticeable amount of weight on this tour, and arguably began to hamper his performances. During a performance in Chicago on 9 April, Page fell ill and needed to sit in a chair to play "Ten Years Gone" before leaving the stage with severe stomach cramps. The show was concluded after only sixty-five minutes, with Page's illness later being attributed to a case of food poisoning; shortly thereafter, a makeup concert was scheduled for 3 August on the final leg of the tour. The Greensboro, North Carolina show began one hour late, with Plant stating, "Sorry, we left somebody in New York."

The tour also experienced some unsavory backstage problems, exacerbated by the hiring of London gangster John Bindon as Led Zeppelin's security coordinator. After a 23 July show at the "Day on the Green" festival at Oakland–Alameda County Coliseum in Oakland, California, Bindon, band manager Peter Grant, tour manager Richard Cole and drummer John Bonham were arrested when a member of promoter Bill Graham's staff was beaten after the performance. Graham's security man Jim Matzorkis had allegedly assaulted Peter Grant's 11-year-old son Warren for allegedly taking a dressing room sign. This was seen by Bonham, who then walked over and kicked the man; later, when Grant was informed of this incident, he went into the trailer, along with Bindon and assaulted the man with tour manager Richard Cole guarding the door; Bindon had stated he was provoked by members of Graham's crew prior to the incident.

Led Zeppelin's second Oakland show took place only after Bill Graham signed a letter of indemnification absolving Led Zeppelin from responsibility for the previous night's incident, but Graham refused to honour the letter and assault charges were laid against Grant, Cole, Bindon, and Bonham when the band arrived back at their hotel. The four received bail, and a suit was filed against them by Graham for $2 million. All four pleaded nolo contendere, receiving suspended sentences and fines.

The following day's second Oakland concert would prove to be the band's final live appearance in the United States. After the performance, news came that Plant's five-year-old son, Karac, had died from a stomach virus. The rest of the tour (including the Chicago Stadium makeup show, a second concert at the venue, and five additional concerts at the Louisiana Superdome, Rich Stadium, the Pittsburgh Civic Arena and John F. Kennedy Stadium) was immediately cancelled.

In recent years, Plant has reflected on the negative dynamics which increasingly became evident as the 1977 tour progressed:

By 1977, I was 29, just prior to Karac's passing, and that sort of wild energy that was there in the beginning had come to the point where we were showboating a bit. Unfortunately, we had no choice. We were on tours where places were going ape-shit. There was no way of containing the energy in those buildings. It was insane. And we became more and more victims of our own success. And the whole deal about the goldfish bowl and living in it, that kicked in.

According to Jack Calmes, the head of Showco (the company that had provided lights, sound, staging, and logistics for the band's American tours since 1973):

There was an extraordinary amount of tension at the start of that tour ... It just got off to a negative start. It was definitely much darker than any [Led] Zeppelin tour ever before that time ... The kind of people they had around them had deepened into some really criminal types. I think Richard Cole and perhaps some of the band and everybody around the band was so far into drugs at that point, that the drugs turned on them. They still had their moments of greatness (but) some of the shows were grinding and not very inspired ... The Bindon brothers were the thugs that were friends of Peter Grant's and were on this whole tour as security guards. And they kind of brought an element of darkness into this thing.

== Recordings ==
At least three indoor concerts from this tour (at Pontiac on 30 April, Houston on 21 May and Seattle on 17 July) were professionally shot by the TV International company for the band and projected live on to a giant video screen. None of these performances have been officially released, and to date, only the Seattle video and audio of the Houston show have been made available on unofficial Led Zeppelin bootleg recordings. Producer Jimmy Page was unable to locate multi-track sound recordings from any 1977 shows, and it is unknown if any exist. However, portions of the Seattle video (minus audio) were used to promote the Led Zeppelin Remasters release in 1990 and some were aired as part of the special MTV Led Zeppelin documentary. In addition, parts were included in the 1997 "Whole Lotta Love" promo.

Audio recordings from many of the tour's shows have been preserved on unofficial bootleg recordings. Notable bootlegs from this tour include Destroyer (the soundboard recording from Cleveland on 27 April), Listen to This Eddie (an audience recording from Los Angeles on 21 June) and For Badgeholders Only (an audience recording from Los Angeles on 23 June).

The second disc of the Led Zeppelin DVD contains semi-hidden bootleg footage from the show at the Los Angeles Forum (under the promos menu). The menu background audio features the complete opening number from the 21 June 1977 show ("The Song Remains the Same") with visuals bootlegged from various shows on the 1977 tour.

== Set list ==
1. "The Song Remains the Same"
2. "The Rover" (interlude)
3. "Sick Again"
4. "Nobody's Fault but Mine"
5. "In My Time of Dying"
6. "Since I've Been Loving You" / "Tea for One"
7. "No Quarter"
8. "Ten Years Gone"
9. "The Battle of Evermore"
10. "Going to California"
11. "Black Country Woman" / "Bron-Yr-Aur Stomp"
12. "White Summer" / "Black Mountain Side"
13. "Kashmir"
14. "Out on the Tiles" (interlude)
15. "Over the Top" / "Moby Dick"
16. "The Star-Spangled Banner"
17. "Achilles Last Stand"
18. "Stairway to Heaven"
  Encore
19. "Rock and Roll"
20. "Trampled Under Foot"

Notes

- Starting on 10 June, "In My Time of Dying" was permanently replaced by "Over the Hills and Far Away".
- On 10-11, 13 and 21 June, "Heartbreaker" was performed as an encore.
- "Black Dog" was performed on 13 and 19 April, 31 May, 13 June, and 23 July.
- Jerry Lee Lewis' "It'll Be Me" was performed during the Fort Worth show and the fifth Inglewood concert.
- On 25 June, "Communication Breakdown" was performed during the encore.
- "Dancing Days" was performed during the second Landover show and the last show in Inglewood.
- Starting on 18 May, a musical interlude of "Whole Lotta Love" was played before "Rock and Roll", and "Trampled Under Foot" was cut from the setlist.

== Tour dates ==
Date (1977)	City	Country	Venue
1 April (Note: Originally 4 March, but was rescheduled due to Plant's laryngitis.)	Dallas	United States	Dallas Memorial Auditorium
3 April (Note: Originally 3 March, but was rescheduled due to Plant's laryngitis.)	Oklahoma City	United States	Myriad Convention Center
6 April	Chicago	United States	Chicago Stadium
7 April	Chicago	United States	Chicago Stadium
9 April	Chicago	United States	Chicago Stadium
10 April	Chicago	United States	Chicago Stadium
12 April	Bloomington	United States	Metropolitan Sports Center
13 April	Saint Paul	United States	St. Paul Civic Center
15 April	St. Louis	United States	St. Louis Arena
17 April	Indianapolis	United States	Market Square Arena
19 April	Cincinnati	United States	Riverfront Coliseum
20 April	Cincinnati	United States	Riverfront Coliseum
23 April (Note: Originally 21 May, but was rescheduled due to Plant's laryngitis.)	Atlanta	United States	Omni Coliseum
25 April	Louisville	United States	Freedom Hall
27 April	Richfield	United States	Richfield Coliseum
28 April	Richfield	United States	Richfield Coliseum
30 April	Pontiac	United States	Pontiac Silverdome
18 May (Note: Originally 20 May, but was rescheduled due to Plant's laryngitis.)	Birmingham	United States	BJCC Coliseum
19 May (Note: Originally 1 March, but was rescheduled due to Plant's laryngitis.)	Baton Rouge	United States	LSU Assembly Center
21 May (Note: Originally 28 February, but was rescheduled due to Plant's laryngitis.)	Houston	United States	The Summit
22 May (Note: Originally 27 February, but was rescheduled due to Plant's laryngitis.)	Fort Worth	United States	Tarrant County Convention Center
25 May	Landover	United States	Capital Centre
26 May	Landover	United States	Capital Centre
28 May	Landover	United States	Capital Centre
30 May	Landover	United States	Capital Centre
31 May	Greensboro	United States	Greensboro Memorial Coliseum
3 June	Tampa	United States	Tampa Stadium
7 June	New York City	United States	Madison Square Garden
8 June	New York City	United States	Madison Square Garden
10 June	New York City	United States	Madison Square Garden
11 June	New York City	United States	Madison Square Garden
13 June	New York City	United States	Madison Square Garden
14 June	New York City	United States	Madison Square Garden
19 June	San Diego	United States	San Diego Sports Arena
21 June (Note: Originally scheduled from 9 to 16 March, but was rescheduled due to Plant's laryngitis.)	Inglewood	United States	The Forum
22 June	Inglewood	United States	The Forum
23 June	Inglewood	United States	The Forum
25 June	Inglewood	United States	The Forum
26 June	Inglewood	United States	The Forum
27 June	Inglewood	United States	The Forum
17 July	Seattle	United States	Kingdome
20 July	Tempe	United States	ASU Activity Center
23 July	Oakland	United States	Oakland-Alameda County Coliseum
24 July	Oakland	United States	Oakland-Alameda County Coliseum

== Cancelled dates ==
List of cancelled dates showing date, city, country, venue, and reason for cancellation
Date (1977)	City	Country	Venue	Reason
30 July	New Orleans	United States	Louisiana Superdome	Karac Plant's death.
2 August	Chicago	United States	Chicago Stadium	Karac Plant's death.
3 August	Chicago	United States	Chicago Stadium	Karac Plant's death.
6 August	Orchard Park	United States	Rich Stadium (Note: The venue was upgraded from Buffalo Memorial Auditorium.)	Karac Plant's death.
9 August	Pittsburgh	United States	Civic Arena	Karac Plant's death.
10 August	Pittsburgh	United States	Civic Arena	Karac Plant's death.
13 August	Philadelphia	United States	John F. Kennedy Stadium	Karac Plant's death.

== Box office score data ==
List of concerts, showing venue, city, tickets sold, number of available tickets and amount of gross revenue
Venue	City	Attendance	Revenue
Riverfront Coliseum	Cincinnati	36,424 / 36,424	$309,604
Pontiac Silverdome	Pontiac	76,000 / 76,000	$790,555
BJCC Coliseum	Birmingham	17,800 / 17,800	$151,300
Total		130,224 / 130,224 (100%)	$1,251,459
