= Listen to This, Eddie =

Album by Led Zeppelin

Listen To This, Eddie

Live album (bootleg) by Led Zeppelin
- Recorded: June 21, 1977
- Venues: Los Angeles Forum, Inglewood, California
- Label: Rock Solid Records

Listen To This, Eddie is a bootleg recording of a rock concert by English band Led Zeppelin, performed on June 21, 1977, at the Los Angeles Forum in Los Angeles, California. The first concert of a six-night stint. It is often noted as one of the band's most noteworthy performances. It is also distinguished by its clear sound.

== Overview ==
The concert was recorded by a member of the audience, Mike Millard, and was later released illegally on vinyl without the permission of the band or the taper. The original vinyl issue of the show was released on Rock Solid Records, and featured the first 60 minutes of the concert, from "The Song Remains the Same" through to "Ten Years Gone".

The cover art for the album featured the same group image of the band member's faces from the back cover of Led Zeppelin III, along with the mysterious obelisk from the cover of Presence. The first pressing for the album was on colored (red) vinyl, numbered 1 of 500. In the 1990s the complete recording of the show became available on CD through various releases, with most of them using the same "Eddie" title. Millard's recording remains one of the best-known Led Zeppelin bootlegs.

Listen To This, Eddie is highly regarded amongst collectors not only because of the highly energetic performance by the band but also because it was captured in exceptionally good audio quality. This can largely be attributed to the dedication and experience of Millard, who by 1977 had already made several bootleg recordings of other concerts performed at the Los Angeles Forum. It is believed that he recorded this particular show from row six.

The complete Millard recording lasts 190 minutes and includes the entire concert (including encores). It was the first of six shows at the Los Angeles Forum by Led Zeppelin, which came towards the end of its 1977 North American concert tour. Millard's recording of the opening number from this concert, "The Song Remains the Same", was included in the promos menu of the Led Zeppelin DVD.

The performance itself is regarded by some critics as being one of the best concerts of the 1977 tour.

== Album title ==
There are two unconfirmed theories about the meaning of the title Listen To This, Eddie, although neither has firm evidence to support it.

The first theory is that it is a reference to Eddie Van Halen of the band Van Halen, who in interviews has criticised the playing ability of Led Zeppelin guitarist, Jimmy Page. In particular, in an interview that Van Halen had given in January 1981 to Guitar World magazine, he was quoted as saying "Jimmy Page is an excellent producer. Led Zeppelin and Led Zeppelin II are classics. As a player, he's very good in the studio. I never saw him play well live. He's very sloppy. He plays like he's got a broken hand and he's two years old. But if you put out a good album and play like a two-year-old live. What's the purpose?" Following this line of thinking, the title is a call to “Eddie" to listen to the recording of this brilliant performance and think again.

The second theory comes from a Shockwaves Magazine article by Pat O'Connor entitled "The Ten Greatest Bootlegs". According to O'Connor, the "Eddie" in the title is audio engineer Eddie Kramer, and not Eddie Van Halen, implying that even Kramer would be impressed by such an outstanding bootleg recording.

== Set list ==
- "The Song Remains The Same"
- "Sick Again"
- "Nobody's Fault but Mine"
- "Over the Hills and Far Away"
- "Since I've Been Loving You"
- "No Quarter" (30 minute mix)
- "Ten Years Gone"
- "The Battle of Evermore"
- "Going to California"
- "Black Country Woman"
- "Bron-Y-Aur Stomp"
- "White Summer/Black Mountain Side"
- "Kashmir"
- "Out on the Tiles/Moby Dick"
- "Heartbreaker"
- Jimmy Page Theremin/Guitar/Bow & Effects Solo (includes "Star Spangled Banner" & "Dixie")
- "Achilles Last Stand"
- "Stairway to Heaven"
- "Whole Lotta Love" (Encore)
- "Rock and Roll" (Encore)

== Neil Young recording ==
Listen to This, Eddie is also the title of a bootleg recording of a June 24, 1995 performance by Neil Young in San Francisco at the Polo Field. The "Eddie" in this case refers to Eddie Vedder of Pearl Jam, who asked Young to take over the concert for him when he became too ill to sing. Many audience members expressed disappointment and impatience with the older musician, but most heard out his lengthy set, which included pieces from the Mirror Ball album Young had recorded with Pearl Jam. It is considered by collectors to be one of the highlight performances of Young's decades-long career. Coincidentally, just before the acoustic set of Led Zeppelin's Listen to This, Eddie, Robert Plant refers to John Bonham as "the cowgirl in the sand", prompting an audience member to yell "Bring out Neil Young!".

== See also ==
- Led Zeppelin bootleg recordings
