= Live on Blueberry Hill =

1970 live album by Led Zeppelin

Live album by Led Zeppelin
- Recorded: September 4, 1970
- Venue: Los Angeles Forum, Inglewood, California
- Length: 106:53
- Label: Trademark of Quality

Professional ratings
Review scores
Source	Rating
AllMusic	3/5 stars

Live on Blueberry Hill (also known as Blueberry Hill) is a bootleg recording of English rock group Led Zeppelin's performance at the Los Angeles Forum on September 4, 1970, which took place during their summer 1970 North American Tour.

The audience recording is one of the first Led Zeppelin bootlegs, and one of the first ever rock and roll bootlegs. It was released on the Blimp label. The album was reissued on the Trademark of Quality label and shipped to England. The album sold so many copies that many fans thought it was a legal release. The sleeve notes describe it as "One hundred and six minutes and fifty three seconds of pure alive rock."

Live on Blueberry Hill derives its name from Zeppelin's performance of Fats Domino's "Blueberry Hill" as a final encore. The bootleg also features one of the few known live performances of "Out on the Tiles", from the group's third album, plus "Bron-Yr-Aur", which would not be released officially until five years later, on Physical Graffiti.

From the 1980s the bootleg became available on CD as a two-disc set, often under the titles Blueberry Hill and The Final Statements.

Led Zeppelin parody cover band Dread Zeppelin released an album in 1995 entitled Live on Blueberry Cheesecake – a play on the title of this bootleg release.

"I actually prefer …Blueberry Hill to [pioneering Zeppelin bootleg] Pb," remarked photographer (and Jimmy Page's friend) Ross Halfin, "even though it isn't such good sound quality, but because it includes the whole show."

In 2017, the Empress Valley bootleg label released the nine-CD, Live On Blueberry Hill: The Complete 1970 L.A. Forum Tapes, which includes five different source recordings of the concert.

== Set list ==
1. "Immigrant Song"
2. "Heartbreaker"
3. "Dazed and Confused"
4. "Bring It On Home"
5. "That's the Way"
6. "Bron-Yr-Aur"
7. "Since I've Been Loving You"
8. "Organ Solo/Thank You"
9. "What Is and What Should Never Be"
10. "Moby Dick"
11. "Whole Lotta Love" (Medley)
  - "Boogie Chillen"
  - "That's All Right"
  - "Moving On"
  - "Red House"
  - "Some Other Guy"
  - "Think It Over"
  - "Honey Bee"
  - "The Lemon Song"
12. "Communication Breakdown" (Medley)
  - "Good Times Bad Times"
  - "For What It's Worth"
  - "I Saw Her Standing There"
13. "Out on the Tiles"
14. "Blueberry Hill"

== See also ==
- Led Zeppelin bootleg recordings
