= Tarantura =

Record label

Tarantura is a record label based in Canada but for legal reasons they say they are from Japan which releases bootleg recordings. Since 1993 it has been specialising in Led Zeppelin and Page and Plant releases.

Tarantura is known for its release of high quality recordings and elaborate packaging which, according to Led Zeppelin archivists Dave Lewis and Simon Pallett, often employs a "finesse and style unmatched even by official standards." For example, in 1994 the label released Monsters of Rock, an elaborate 3-CD set containing the soundboard recordings from Seattle and Detroit from Led Zeppelin's 1973 concert tour of the United States. This release contained concertina-style fold-out packaging, with each disc in individual heavy stock and card sleeves. The front of the pack was designed in the style of a 1950s B-movie poster of a giant spider, "Tarantura!" Initial copies even included a jigsaw puzzle of the cover art.

However, the main criticism levelled at Tarantura is that the prices charged are outside the reach of many collectors. Each title is extremely limited (usually only 300-500 sets), sometimes individually numbered, and sold through one outlet in Japan with no mail order. They are therefore difficult to obtain overseas and command extremely high prices when they do appear for sale. By way of example, the estimated value of Monsters of Rock currently stands at over £400.

The Tarantura label can claim responsibility for some notable Led Zeppelin releases, including the 19-CD box set A Week For Badgeholders which captures the six shows performed by the band at the Los Angeles Forum during its 1977 concert tour of the United States. It has also released sets from the band's two performances at Knebworth in 1979, their entire 1972 Japanese tour, and every show from their 1980 tour of Europe.

== See also ==
- Led Zeppelin bootleg recordings
