= Burn Like a Candle =

Album by Led Zeppelin

Burn Like A Candle

Live album by Led Zeppelin
- Recorded: June 25, 1972
- Venue: Los Angeles Forum, Los Angeles
- Label: Smoking Pig

Burn Like a Candle is a bootleg recording of the English rock band Led Zeppelin performing at the Los Angeles Forum on June 25, 1972. It was originally released on CD format in the 1990s by the Smoking Pig label.

The audience recording includes the entire show, (with the exception of the final encore, "Weekend") and is well known for its many rare encores, including "Louie Louie". It is also noted for its original cover artwork by William Stout, who drew many of the covers for some of the original vinyl Led Zeppelin bootlegs in the 1970s. The release has been described as "a must for any collector".

The album title is derived from a comment Led Zeppelin singer, Robert Plant, delivered from the stage during this concert, in which he mentioned that their fifth album did not yet have a title: "It's not gonna be called Led Zeppelin Five, it's got every possibility of being called Burn That Candle" (The album, released the following year, would ultimately be entitled Houses of the Holy).

For many years this audience recording (including subsequent bootleg versions with various packaging) was all that existed from this show. In 2003, an edit of professionally recorded soundboard tapes from this show and the subsequent Long Beach show was officially released on the album How the West Was Won. However, this bootleg, as an internet download, contains the entire, unedited version of the show. There are versions of songs not included on How the West Was Won, such as "Thank You", "Communication Breakdown", and the entire acoustic set. The "Whole Lotta Love" medley includes a performance of "Heartbreak Hotel" and "Slow Down" both of which are not included on the official release.

== Set list ==
- "LA Drone"
- "Immigrant Song"
- "Heartbreaker"
- "Over the Hills and Far Away"
- "Black Dog"
- "Since I've Been Loving You"
- "Stairway to Heaven"
- "Going to California"
- "That's the Way"
- "Tangerine"
- "Bron-Y-Aur Stomp"
- "Dazed and Confused/Walter's Walk/The Crunge"
- "What Is and What Should Never Be"
- "Dancing Days"
- "Moby Dick"
- "Whole Lotta Love Medley: Boogie Chillen'/Let's Have a Party/Hello Mary Lou/Heartbreak Hotel/Slow Down/Goin' Down Slow/The Shape I'm In"
- "Rock and Roll"
- "The Ocean"
- "Louie Louie"
- "Everyday People"
- "Organ Solo"
- "Thank You
- "Communication Breakdown"
- "Bring It On Home"
- "Weekend". (some bootlegs include a recording of this song from June 14, 1972, at the Nassau Coliseum)

== See also ==
- Led Zeppelin bootleg recordings
