= Mike Millard =

American bootleg recorder

Mike Millard (May 18, 1951 – November 29, 1994), nicknamed "Mike The Mic" was an avid concert taper circa 1973 to 1994, recording over 300 concerts, including Led Zeppelin, Pink Floyd and the Rolling Stones concerts in California. He taped virtually every show at the Forum from 1974 to 1980. Many of his recordings ended up in the hands of bootleggers, who sold Millard's work to fans.

Starting with a basic mono recorder in 1973, Millard upgraded to a Nakamichi 550 stereo recorder with AKG Acoustics 451E microphones for the 1975 Led Zeppelin shows in the area. He often used a wheelchair to conceal his equipment, pretending to be disabled. Unlike most 1970s audience bootlegs, Millard's recordings are known for their good sound quality, and are to this day considered some of the finest audio bootlegs available.

Millard's recording of the Led Zeppelin concert on June 21, 1977 at the Forum (allegedly taped from row number six) was released under the title Listen to This, Eddie, and remains one of the best-known Led Zeppelin bootlegs. His recording of the opening number from the concert, "The Song Remains The Same", was included in the promos menu of the Led Zeppelin DVD. Millard recorded four of the Rolling Stones' five 1975 shows at the LA Forum, and his recording of the Sunday, July 13, 1975 show (titled 'LA Friday') has become one of the most widely spread recordings of a Rolling Stones concert.

Millard was never behind the sale of bootlegs and was openly against the illegal sale of his recordings. He was notorious for "marking" copies of his tapes so that if one of his recordings turned up for sale on LP or CD, he would be able to tell which person he had traded it to. He kept a very detailed logbook of his marked recordings and who they were distributed to. "Unmarked" copies of Millard's recordings are very scarce. In 2016, several unmarked first-generation copies of his Led Zeppelin recordings surfaced in trading circles. As of May 2026, 261 of Millard's concert recordings have been released on the Internet; many can be found in audio form on YouTube.

Millard reportedly suffered from depression and a cocaine addiction. He committed suicide in 1994, aged 43.

Millard's recording setup was used by the National in 2019 to record two of their shows in Berkeley, California, and an accompanying documentary titled Juicy Sonic Magic: The Mike Millard Method was also created. The Berkeley recordings were released in a three-cassette box set designed as an homage to Millard for Record Store Day 2019.

Mike is best known for the 10 Led Zeppelin shows that he recorded in Southern California in the 1970s. Those shows include March 11 and 12 in Long Beach and at the Forum on March 24, 25, and 27th on the 1975 North American tour. When the band returned to southern California for the 1977 concert tour of North America, he recorded the band in San Diego June 19 and then four times at the Forum on June 21, 23, 25, and 27th.

A 2021 Rolling Stone article lauded the quality of his April 26, 1975 recording of Pink Floyd, going so far as to say, "If Pink Floyd ever decides to create a Bootleg Series, they should get their hands on Millard's master tapes — starting with this 1975 Los Angeles gig. It's the band at the peak of their abilities as a live act and deserves to be heard as widely as possible." Millard's tapes of the Los Angeles show were officially released on 12 December 2025 as part of Pink Floyd's 50th Anniversary Wish You Were Here box set. The recording was remastered by Steven Wilson. Millard's Pink Floyd master tapes were also released as a four-LP and two-CD set for Record Store Day, April 18, 2026.
