= Led Zeppelin Japanese Tour 1972 =

1972 concert tour by Led Zeppelin

Japan 1972
- Tour by Led Zeppelin
- Poster for Led Zeppelin's concerts at Tokyo, used to help promote its 1972 Japanese tour
- Associated album: Led Zeppelin IV; Houses of the Holy
- Start date: 2 October 1972
- End date: 10 October 1972
- No. of shows: 6

Led Zeppelin concert chronology
- North America 1972; Japan 1972; United Kingdom 1972/1973

Led Zeppelin's 1972 Japanese Tour was the second and final concert tour of Japan by the English rock band. The tour commenced on 2 October and concluded on 10 October 1972.

This tour took place shortly following the recording of the band's fifth album, Houses of the Holy. Two tracks from the album were played live for first time, namely "The Song Remains the Same" and "The Rain Song". For these tracks, Jimmy Page used his characteristic Gibson EDS-1275 double-neck guitar. Other songs from the album were also played, but these had already been debuted on previous concert tours.

It was on this tour that John Paul Jones played his mellotron for the first time. He used it for the tracks "Stairway to Heaven", "The Rain Song" and "Thank You". He also introduced an arco stand-up bass, which he played during "Bron-Yr-Aur Stomp".

Some observers have noted that it was during this tour that the vocals of singer Robert Plant began to show signs of damage, as he arguably started to lose the extremely high-pitched wail which was evident on previous concert tours and album releases. In particular, Plant strained to sing the song "Rock and Roll", leading him to change the melody of the song to a lower register on all future tours.

Whilst on this tour, Jones bought a traditional Japanese string instrument called a Koto. He later used this instrument on his solo album Zooma (1999).

== Tour set list ==
The dropping of the acoustic set by the band resulted in shorter set lists than those played on more recent tours, with shows now extending to a more manageable length of around two hours. The fairly typical set list for the tour was:

1. "Rock and Roll" (Page, Plant, Jones, Bonham)
2. "Out on the Tiles" (intro) (Page, Plant, Bonham) / "Black Dog" (Page, Plant, Jones)
3. "Over the Hills and Far Away" (Page, Plant)
4. "Misty Mountain Hop" (Jones, Page, Plant)
5. "Since I've Been Loving You" (Page, Plant, Jones)
6. "Dancing Days" (Page, Plant)
7. "Bron-Yr-Aur Stomp" (Page, Plant, Jones)
8. "The Song Remains the Same" (Page, Plant)
9. "The Rain Song" (Page, Plant)
10. "Dazed and Confused" (Page)
11. "Stairway to Heaven" (Page, Plant)
12. "Moby Dick" (Bonham, Jones, Page) (on 5 and 9 October only)
13. "Whole Lotta Love" (Bonham, Dixon, Jones, Page, Plant)

Encores (variations of the following list):

- "Heartbreaker" (Bonham, Page, Plant) (On 2 October and 4 October)
- "Immigrant Song" (Page, Plant)
- "Thank You" (Page, Plant) (On 5 October)
- "The Ocean" (Bonham, Jones, Page, Plant) (On 3 October)
- "Communication Breakdown" (Bonham, Jones, Page) (On 2 October)
- "Stand by Me" (King, Leiber, Stoller), performed in Osaka on 9 October

There were some set list substitutions, variations, and order switches during the tour.

== Tour dates ==
Date	City	Country	Venue
2 October 1972	Tokyo	Japan	Nippon Budokan
3 October 1972	Tokyo	Japan	Nippon Budokan
4 October 1972	Osaka	Japan	Festival Hall
5 October 1972	Nagoya	Japan	Nagoya Civic Assembly Hall
9 October 1972	Osaka	Japan	Festival Hall
10 October 1972	Kyoto	Japan	Kyoto Kaikan

== Sources ==
- Lewis, Dave and Pallett, Simon (1997) Led Zeppelin: The Concert File, London: Omnibus Press. ISBN 0-7119-5307-4.
