= Good Times Bad Times =

1969 single by Led Zeppelin

- German single picture sleeve

Single by Led Zeppelin

from the album Led Zeppelin
- B-side: "Communication Breakdown"
- Released: 10 March 1969
- Recorded: 3 October 1968
- Studio: Olympic, London
- Genre: Hard rock; • funk rock • blues rock
- Length: 2:43
- Label: Atlantic
- Songwriters: Jimmy Page; John Paul Jones; John Bonham; Robert Plant (Note: Plant was not originally credited as a writer because of unexpired contractual obligations to CBS Records, although he received a credit later.)
- Producer: Jimmy Page

Led Zeppelin singles chronology
"Good Times Bad Times" (1969)	"Whole Lotta Love" (1969)

Audio sample
- file; help

"Good Times Bad Times" is a song by the English rock band Led Zeppelin, featured as the opening track on their 1969 debut album Led Zeppelin. The song was Led Zeppelin's first single released in the US, where it reached the Billboard Hot 100 chart.

== Background and composition ==
The composition of the song began before the band's recording sessions at Atlantic Studios. The original title was "A Man I Know".

The main riff of "Good Times Bad Times" was written by John Paul Jones on a Hammond organ, who later said it was the most difficult riff he ever wrote, as well as one of the hardest riffs for him to perform. Guitarist Jimmy Page played a Fender Telecaster that Jeff Beck had given him through a Tone Bender and a Supro amplifier. Page's guitar solo was fed through a Leslie speaker to create a swirling effect. Singer Robert Plant's vocals were largely double-tracked.

Drummer John Bonham plays fast triplets on a single bass drum, which drew praise from Jimi Hendrix. He attributed the idea to Carmine Appice of Vanilla Fudge, who had played a similar figure on the band's cover of the Beatles' "Ticket to Ride" (which appeared on the band's debut album Vanilla Fudge), though Appice had not played the triplets exclusively on the bass drum.

== Personnel ==
According to Jean-Michel Guesdon and Philippe Margotin:

- Robert Plant – vocals, vocal harmonies
- Jimmy Page – guitars, backing vocals (?)
- John Paul Jones – bass, backing vocals (?)
- John Bonham – drums, backing vocals (?)

== Live performances ==
"Good Times Bad Times" was rarely played live at Led Zeppelin concerts in its entirety. In a few instances in 1969 it was used as an introduction to "Communication Breakdown" (as seen in Led Zeppelin (Deluxe Edition)). It also appeared in almost complete form within the "Communication Breakdown" medley performed at the LA Forum on 4 September 1970, where it included a bass solo by Jones (as can be heard on the Led Zeppelin bootleg recording Live on Blueberry Hill), and several "Whole Lotta Love" medleys in 1971. It was also the opening song for Led Zeppelin's reunion show at the O2 Arena, London on 10 December 2007. The version of "Good Times Bad Times/Communication Breakdown" released 15 April 2014, on iTunes, is from 10 October 1969 in Paris, on the European Tour of Autumn 1969.

== Reception and charts ==
Cash Box said that "Combined power of a teen-rock vocal and a solid FM-ized instrumental set give Led Zeppelin a blistering single debut." Billboard called it a "singles swinger that should hit the chart with solid sales impact" and said that it has a "solid beat in strong support".

In a reassessment of Led Zeppelin in 2001, Greg Kot of Rolling Stone praised "Good Times Bad Times", writing that the song begins the album with a bang: "Jimmy Page's guitar pounces from the speakers, fat with menace; John Bonham's kick drum swings with anvil force; Robert Plant rambles on about the perils of manhood. Hard rock would never be the same."

Charts (1969)
Chart	Peak position
Canada Top Singles (RPM)	64
Netherlands (Dutch Top 40)	19
Netherlands (Single Top 100)	17
US Billboard Hot 100	80
US Cash Box	66
US Record World	65

== Certifications ==
Region	Certification	Certified units/sales
United Kingdom (BPI)	Silver	200,000^{‡}
^{‡} Sales+streaming figures based on certification alone.

== Bibliography ==
- Guesdon, Jean-Michel; Margotin, Philippe (2018). Led Zeppelin All the Songs: The Story Behind Every Track. Running Press. ISBN 978-0-316-448-67-3.
- Kiste, John Van der (2018). Led Zeppelin: Song by Song. Fonthill Media Limited. ISBN 978-1-78155-726-6.
- Lewis, Dave (1990). Led Zeppelin : A Celebration. Omnibus Press. ISBN 978-0-711-92416-1.
- Lewis, Dave (2010). Led Zeppelin: The Complete Guide to Their Music. London: Omnibus Press. ISBN 978-0857121356.
- Popoff, Martin (2018). Led Zeppelin: All the Albums, All the Songs. Voyageur Press. ISBN 978-0-7603-6377-5.
