= The Rover (Led Zeppelin song) =

Song by Led Zeppelin

from the album Physical Graffiti
- Released: 24 February 1975
- Recorded: May 1972; February 1974 (?); April–May 1974
- Studio: Rolling Stones Mobile Studio, Stargroves, Newbury, Berkshire; Ronnie Lane Mobile Studio, Headley Grange, Hampshire; Ronnie Lane Mobile Studio, Headley Grange, Hampshire
- Genre: Hard rock
- Length: 5:44
- Label: Swan Song
- Songwriter(s): Jimmy Page; Robert Plant
- Producer(s): Jimmy Page

"The Rover" is a song by English rock band Led Zeppelin written by guitarist Jimmy Page and singer Robert Plant. Although mostly recorded years earlier, it was released on the group's 1975 double album, Physical Graffiti.

== Recording and release ==
Writing for the song began in 1970 at Bron-Yr-Aur, a rustic retreat in South Snowdonia, Wales. Initially an acoustic piece, it took on a hard rock arrangement when recorded at Stargroves during the sessions for the Houses of the Holy album in 1972. The song was not included on the album, but after Jimmy Page added several guitar overdubs in 1974, it was added to Led Zeppelin's following album, Physical Graffiti. As the liner notes state, for the song, the "Guitar [was] lost courtesy of [engineer Ron] Nevison [and] salvaged by the grace of [Keith] Harwood". Nevison has disputed this, claiming the band never brought tapes from previous sessions to him for playback and that "The Rover" wasn't one of the songs he recorded with them at Headley Grange.

== Reception ==
In a contemporary review of Physical Graffiti, Jim Miller of Rolling Stone gave "The Rover" a mixed review, saying that while Page and Bonham "mount a bristling attack", the track "suffers from Plant's indefinite pitch."

In a retrospective review of Physical Graffiti (Deluxe Edition), Jon Hadusek of Consequence of Sound described Jimmy Page's guitar lines in "The Rover" as some of his most underrated guitar lines he's ever recorded.

== Live performances ==
"The Rover" was never played live in its entirety at Led Zeppelin concerts, although the band played the opening bars as an introduction to "Sick Again" throughout their 1977 North American tour. However, the song was rehearsed in full, as can be heard on bootleg recordings of the band's soundcheck rehearsal at the Chicago Stadium on 6 July 1973. This rehearsal took place before the opening date of the second leg of the band's 1973 North American tour.

== Personnel ==
According to Jean-Michel Guesdon and Philippe Margotin:

- Robert Plant – vocals
- Jimmy Page – electric guitars
- John Paul Jones – bass
- John Bonham – drums

== See also ==
- List of cover versions of Led Zeppelin songs – "The Rover" entries

== Notes ==
Citations

References

- Case, George (2009). Jimmy Page: Magus, Musician, Man: An Unauthorized Biography. Backbeat Books. ISBN 978-0-87930-947-3.
- Lewis, Dave (1994). The Complete Guide to the Music of Led Zeppelin. Omnibus Press. ISBN 0-7119-3528-9.
- Popoff, Martin (2017). Led Zeppelin: All the Albums, All the Songs. MBI. ISBN 978-0-76035-211-3.

== Bibliography ==
- Guesdon, Jean-Michel; Margotin, Philippe (2018). Led Zeppelin All the Songs: The Story Behind Every Track. Running Press. ISBN 978-0-316-448-67-3.
