= Led Zeppelin bootleg recordings =

Recorded unreleased media of Led Zeppelin

The Led Zeppelin bootleg recordings are a collection of audio and video recordings of musical performances by the English rock band Led Zeppelin which were never officially released by the band, or under other legal authority. The recordings consist of both live concert performances and outtakes from studio sessions conducted by the band. Many hundreds of Led Zeppelin bootlegs exist, and are widely collected by fans.

== Overview ==
Led Zeppelin were, throughout the decade of the 1970s, one of the world's most frequently bootlegged performers, and to this day remain one of the most bootlegged artists in the history of rock music. In August 1999, the band topped the list of Britain's most bootlegged musicians with 384 bootleg titles, compiled by the Anti-Piracy Unit of British Phonographic Industry. This phenomenon was due partly to the popularity of the band, which has ensured a large and enthusiastic market for unauthorised recordings, and partly to the large size of the audiences who attended their performances, which made the effective detection of covert recording equipment at these concerts virtually impossible.

Led Zeppelin's manager, Peter Grant, sometimes took extraordinary measures to combat the practice of live bootleg recordings at Led Zeppelin concerts. He is reported to have personally visited record stores in London that were selling Led Zeppelin bootlegs and demanded all copies be handed over. He also monitored the crowd at Led Zeppelin concerts so as to locate anything which resembled bootleg recording equipment. At one concert at Vancouver in 1971 he saw what he thought was recording equipment on the floor of the venue and personally ensured that the equipment be destroyed, only to find out later that the equipment was a noise pollution unit being operated by city officials to test the volume of the concert. Similarly, at the Bath Festival in 1970, he personally threw a bucket of water over unauthorised recording equipment.

These efforts were not enough to prevent the release of a flood of Led Zeppelin bootlegs from the 1970s onwards. As is explained by Led Zeppelin archivist Dave Lewis:

Bootlegs and Led Zeppelin have been synonymous for over three decades. Despite manager Peter Grant's heavy-handedness when dealing with those he caught taping their shows, the band are the most bootlegged act of all time, outstripping even The Beatles, [Bob] Dylan, [Bruce] Springsteen and the [Rolling] Stones. Their final seven shows in the UK alone (five at Earl's Court and two at Knebworth), account for over 100 different releases between them. Just about every amateur recording of the band's live gigs has [been released]."

=== Earliest bootlegs ===
During the 1970s, bootleg labels such as Smilin' Ear, Kornyfone, Dragonfly, Trade Mark of Quality, Condor and Toasted released unofficial recordings of several Led Zeppelin shows on vinyl. The following table includes a sample of these recordings. Most of them derived from audience tapes, though a few (such as Destroyer) were sourced from soundboard recordings.

Title	Recording details	Notes
Gonzaga '68	The Gymnasium, Gonzaga University, Spokane, Washington, December 30, 1968	Audience recording.
The Rising of The Zeppelin	Fillmore West, San Francisco, April 24, 1969	Erroneously credited as being on January 9, 1969. The original LP was released in a magnificent red, green and blue color.
Killing Floor	Boston Tea Party, Boston, January 26, 1969.	Audience recording.
Don't Mess With Texas	Texas International Pop Festival, Dallas, August 31, 1969	Soundboard recording.
We're Gonna Groove/Feel All Right	Montreux Casino, Montreux, Switzerland, March 7, 1970	The Feel All Right version was released in 1984 by Audio Recording Corporation under the incorrect title of Live in Montreux 1971.
Mudslide	Pacific Coliseum, Vancouver, Canada on March 21, 1970	The first ever Led Zeppelin bootleg to be released. Soundboard recording formerly assumed to be an FM broadcast. Mudslide is a remake of the original first LP 'PB'.
Ottawa Sunshine	Tracks 1-3 are FM recordings from London on March 19, 1969. All other tracks were recorded live in Ottawa, Ontario on April 14, 1970.	Soundboard/audience recording.
Live on Blueberry Hill	Los Angeles Forum, Los Angeles, September 4, 1970.	Audience recording. One of the first Led Zeppelin bootleg LPs to be released.
BBC Zep	The Paris Theatre, London, April 1, 1971.	Soundboard recording (mono). Another early release on LP (1972), later included on the official BBC Sessions album.
Going to California	Berkeley Community Theatre, Berkeley, September 14, 1971	Audience recording.
Japan Tour '71	Budokan Hall, Tokyo, Japan, September 23, 1971	Audience recording, distributed by BUG Recording Corp.
The Making of Friends	Bombay, India, April, 1972	Soundboard recording.
Custard Pie	Offenburg, West Germany, March 24, 1973	Audience recording.
Tympani for the Butter Queen	Tarrant County Convention Center, Fort Worth, Texas, May 19, 1973	Soundboard recording.
Bonzo's Birthday Party	Los Angeles Forum, California, May 31, 1973	Audience recording (incomplete soundboard available). "A favourite of mine because of the artwork by an artist named William Stout…" remarked photographer (and Jimmy Page's friend) Ross Halfin. "I like the picture of a pig coming out of a birthday cake. William Stout also did artwork for the Rolling Stones bootleg In Exotic Honolulu and The Who's Who's Zoo."
Persistence	Kezar Stadium, San Francisco, June 2, 1973	Audience recording.
V-1/2	Seattle Center Coliseum, Seattle, July 17, 1973	Audience recording.
Duckwalks and Lasers	Madison Square Garden, New York City, July 28, 1973, and Tarrant County Convention Center, Fort Worth, Texas, May 22, 1977	Soundboard recording (side 1 & 2 – July 28, 1973) and audience recording (side 3 & 4 – May 22, 1977).
214	Seattle Center Coliseum, March 21, 1975.	Audience recording.
207.19	Seattle Center Coliseum, March 21, 1975.	Audience recording.
Earls Court	Earls Court Arena, May 24, 1975.	Soundboard recording.
Destroyer	Richfield Coliseum, Cleveland, Ohio, April 27, 1977	Soundboard recording.
Listen to This Eddie	Los Angeles Forum, Los Angeles, June 21, 1977	Audience recording (taped by Mike Millard).
For Badgeholders Only	Los Angeles Forum, Los Angeles, June 23, 1977	Audience recording. (The original vinyl bootleg was recorded by Jon Wizardo, although it is commonly mistaken as having been taped by Mike Millard, who made a separate recording of the show.) Keith Moon joined in on drum set for "Moby Dick" and the encores.

=== The 1980s: the release of the soundboards ===
In the late 1980s, the number of available soundboard recordings of Led Zeppelin shows increased significantly as a result of original soundboard tapes being stolen during a burglary at the home of Led Zeppelin guitarist Jimmy Page and later copied for underground release. Also stolen were copies of several rare studio out-takes, which were released under titles such as Jennings Farm Blues (featuring run-throughs of an electric version of "Bron-Y-Aur Stomp" recorded in October 1969) and Studio Daze (including different studio mixes of "Since I've Been Loving You", "No Quarter" and "All My Love"). "Midnight Moonlight", a song later recorded by "The Firm", is also available through studio bootlegs.

=== The 1990s: the CD era ===
The 1990s saw a multitude of Led Zeppelin bootlegs become available on the CD format, with limited-edition and higher quality releases being produced in Japan on labels such as Tarantura and Antrabata. The most significant 90s label TDOLZ (The Diagrams of Led Zeppelin) has covered most of the circulating concerts for that period releasing over 100 titles. In 1999, the BBC reported that the number of Led Zeppelin bootleg titles in circulation exceeded those of The Beatles.

Some notable Led Zeppelin bootlegs released on CD include:

- Don't Mess with Texas : Recorded at the Texas international Pop Festival in Dallas on August 31, 1969.
- Burn Like A Candle : The complete show from the Los Angeles Forum on June 25, 1972.
- Pigeon Blood : Recorded at Tampa Stadium, Florida on May 5, 1973.
- Knebworth : Both of the band's performances at the Knebworth Festival in August 1979.

=== The 2000s and present: Empress Valley soundboard breakthrough ===
Numerous previously uncirculated complete high quality soundboard recordings were released by newly established Empress Valley label (also referenced as Empress Valley Supreme Disc or EVSD) which is the semi-successor of retired Tarantura. While Empress Valley surfaced many of the recordings, some, including "Working Tapes" were merely repackages of tapes fans had already surfaced and traded via the Internet. Also, early releases such as the "Physical Rocket" DVD were made from sub-par videotapes and were later far surpassed by versions surfaced by fans:

Year	Title	Recording details
2002	The Zeppelin Express Physical Rocket	Earl's Court, London, UK on 25 May 1975; professionally shot live video from that concert was released subsequently on DVD, audio material was reissued two times as A Young Person's Guide to Led Zeppelin and When We Were Kings
2002	Flying Circus	Madison Square Garden, New York City, US on 12 February 1975
2003	Florida Sunshine	Orlando Sports Stadium, Orlando, US on 31 August 1971
2003	Bringing the House Down	Capital Centre, Landover, US on 26 May 1977
2003	Chasing the Dragon	Memorial Auditorium, Dallas, US on 4 March 1975; an incomplete soundboard recording of this concert had previously circulated. Also included in Statistical Analyzing Shot box set as A Conspiracy in Dallas
2004	Conspiracy Theory	Sports Arena, San Diego, US on 14 March 1975. An unknown concert date before this bootleg's release.
2004	St. Louis Blues	St. Louis Arena, St. Louis, US on 16 February 1975
2005	The Dragon Snake	The Summit, Houston, US on 21 May 1977
2006	Snow Jobs	Pacific Coliseum, Vancouver, Canada on 19 March 1975
2007	Days Confused	Memorial Auditorium, Dallas, US on 5 March 1975; also included in Statistical Analyzing Shot box set as The Ultimate Punishment
2007	Working Tapes	The Old Refectory, Southampton University, UK on 22 January 1973
2007	The Powhatan Confederacy	Capital Centre, Landover, US on 28 May 1977
2008	St. Valentine's Day Massacre	Nassau Coliseum, Uniondale, US on 14 February 1975
2009	Long Beach Californication	Long Beach Arena, Long Beach, US on 11 March 1975
2009	Rampaging Cajun	LSU Assembly Center, Baton Rouge, US on 28 February 1975
2010	Magical Sound Boogie	Madison Square Garden, New York City, US on 7 June 1977
2011	Haven't We Met Somewhere Before?	Seattle Center Coliseum, Seattle, US on 17 March 1975
2012	Snowblind	Pacific Coliseum, Vancouver, Canada on 20 March 1975; package also includes the previous 19 March Vancouver show soundboard that was released in 2006 as Snow Jobs
2012	Double Shot	Capital Centre, Landover, US on 25 May 1977 and 30 May 1977; two separate shows in one release; also Maryland Moonshine a box set containing all four Capital Centre shows (26 May 1977 and 28 May 1977 released previously)
2013	The King's of the Stone Age	Nassau Coliseum, Uniondale, US on 13 February 1975. Jamming with a Woody is a 3 CD release of only the 13 February soundboard recording. Simultaneously released The King's of the Stone Age is a 9-CD box set containing the same 13 February soundboard, along with a duplicate of EVSD's 2008-released St. Valentine's Day Massacre soundboard from 14 February, and a duplicate of EVSD's 2002-released Fighting Back At the Coliseum audience tape recording of the 13 February concert; The King's of the Stone Age title also was issued as a 6 CD version with only the two soundboards from 13 and 14 February.
2014	Texas Hurricane	Tarrant County Convention Center, Fort Worth, US on 22 May 1977
2015	Rock Super Stars	Tarrant County Convention Center, Fort Worth, US on 3 March 1975; also included in Statistical Analyzing Shot box set as Sparking J.H.B.
2016	Ultra Violent Killer Droog	Capital Centre, Landover, US on 10 February 1975
2017	Deus Ex Machina	Seattle Center Coliseum, Seattle, US on 21 March 1975
2018	How The East Was Won	Festival Hall, Osaka, Japan on 29 September 1971
2020	The Awesome Foursome Live at the Forum	The Forum, Los Angeles, US on 24 March 1975
2021	Jesus	Met Center, Bloomington, US on 18 January 1975

Since Empress Valley is the only supplier of new soundboard material for the moment, its issues are being cloned after initial release by numerous minor labels, sometimes with alternative titles. As noted above, however, Empress Valley has done its own share of repackaging already existent tapes.

=== Bootleg trading on the Web ===
In the 80s and 90s before broadband Internet access became widely available, bootlegs (CD-Rs or Compact Cassette copies) circulated mostly via the mail. Today, all of the unauthorised Led Zeppelin material is available on the Internet, mostly on BitTorrent resources in lossless media formats. Decoding and redistributing audio in lossy formats (such as MP3) is strongly frowned upon among the trading community as it diminishes the quality of the audio and can make it difficult for recipients to know if they are receiving the best available copy. During the 2000s, previously uncirculated audience recordings surfaced mostly on the BitTorrent resources.

Notable previously unheard audience recordings that surfaced on the Web from 2000s:

- École Centrale, Paris, France on December 6, 1969.
- Olympia Stadium, Detroit, US on August 28, 1970.
- Madison Square Garden, New York City, US on September 19, 1970 (evening show).
- The Casino, Montreux, Switzerland on August 7, 1971.
- The Spectrum, Philadelphia, US on June 13, 1972.
- Chicago Stadium, Chicago, US on January 22, 1975.
- Riverfront Coliseum, Cincinnati, US on April 20, 1977.
- Freedom Hall, Louisville, US on April 25, 1977.

== 2007 court case ==
In July 2007 Page appeared in a Glasgow Sheriff courtroom to give testimony and observe evidence on behalf of Led Zeppelin against an alleged bootlegger. Robert Langley was charged with, and denied, 12 counts of producing and selling products without copyright permission.

Page was shown hundreds of CDs and DVDs, ranging from his solo material to his time with Led Zeppelin and the Yardbirds, which Langley was allegedly selling in Scotland during 2005. Many contain footage and audio from Page's personal collection, stolen from his home in the early 1980s. The goods were found on sale as far away as New York City, where shop-owners thought they were official. Page later said "If you have something like this that appears legitimate then it is just not right".

Following Page's testimony, Langley changed his plea and admitted guilt to three trademark and two copyright infringements. He was sentenced to 20 months in prison which, at the time, was believed to be the highest sentence handed out to a bootlegger in Scotland.

== Sources ==
- Dave Lewis and Simon Pallett (1997) Led Zeppelin: The Concert File, London: Omnibus Press. ISBN 0-7119-5307-4.
- Robert Godwin (1994) The Illustrated Collectors Guide to Led Zeppelin Volume 1, Burlington: Collectors Guide Publishing. ISBN 978-0-9695736-3-0
- Robert Godwin (1997) The Illustrated Collectors Guide to Led Zeppelin Volume 2, Burlington: Collectors Guide Publishing. ISBN 978-1-896522-42-5
- Luis Rey (1997) Led Zeppelin Live: An Illustrated Exploration of Underground Tapes, Ontario: The Hot Wacks Press. ISBN 0-9698080-7-0.
