= Ten Years Gone =

Song by Led Zeppelin

from the album Physical Graffiti
- Released: 24 February 1975
- Recorded: 1974
- Studio: Headley Grange, Headley, England; Olympic, London
- Genre: Hard rock
- Length: 6:37 (Note: The 1975 Physical Graffiti LP lists the running time as 6:55, while the 1993 Complete Studio Recordings shows 6:31.)
- Label: Swan Song
- Songwriters: Jimmy Page; Robert Plant
- Producer: Jimmy Page

"Ten Years Gone" is a song by English rock band Led Zeppelin from their 1975 album Physical Graffiti. Record producer Rick Rubin has described the song as, "A deep, reflective piece with hypnotic, interweaving riffs. Light and dark, shadow and glare. It sounds like nature coming through the speakers."

== Recording and production ==
Jimmy Page had originally intended the song to be an instrumental piece; he recorded around 14 guitar tracks to overdub the harmony section. Robert Plant later added lyrics, which are dedicated to an old girlfriend who, ten years earlier, had made him choose either her or his music. Plant explained this in an interview in 1975:

Let me tell you a little story behind the song "Ten Years Gone" on our new album. I was working my ass off before joining Zeppelin. A lady I really dearly loved said, "Right. It's me or your fans." Not that I had fans, but I said, "I can't stop, I've got to keep going." She's quite content these days, I imagine. She's got a washing machine that works by itself and a little sports car. We wouldn't have anything to say anymore. I could probably relate to her, but she couldn't relate to me. I'd be smiling too much. Ten years gone, I'm afraid. Anyway, there's a gamble for you.

== Live performances ==
Live versions of this song were performed on Led Zeppelin's 1977 concert tour of the United States and at the first Knebworth show in 1979. John Paul Jones originally played the melody on an acoustic guitar before introducing a custom triple-necked instrument created by Andy Manson, that included six-string and twelve-string guitars, a mandolin, and bass pedals.

Page also performed this song on his tour with the Black Crowes in 1999. In an interview he later gave to National Public Radio, Page commented on this collaboration with the Black Crowes:

We did "Ten Years Gone" and all of a sudden I heard all of the guitar parts that I had never heard apart from on record. We could never do all those guitar parts with just the one guitar with Led Zeppelin. It was fantastic.

One version is included on Live at the Greek (2000). It peaked at number 33 on Billboard's Mainstream Rock chart.

== Reception ==
In a contemporary review of Physical Graffiti, Jim Miller of Rolling Stone described "Ten Years Gone" as having a progression reminiscent of the Beatles' "Dear Prudence" that "resolves in a beautifully waddling refrain." Miller also believed Plant sounded like Rod Stewart on the track, with Page "scooping broad and fuzzy chords" behind him.

In a retrospective review of Physical Graffiti (Deluxe Edition), Jon Hadusek of Consequence of Sound called "Ten Years Gone" one of Page/Plant's "most sincere compositions". In another retrospective review of Physical Graffiti (Deluxe Edition), Brice Ezell of PopMatters gave "Ten Years Gone" an extremely positive review, stating the track was one of Physical Graffiti's highlights along with having some of Page's "most enrapturing guitar work, particularly in the way he layers multiple riffs on top of each other." Ezell continued, calling the song's main riff "lovely and echoey" and "over the course of six and a half minutes [the song] ebbs and flows, trading off sky-gazing moments of reflection with bursts of euphoria."

== See also ==
- List of cover versions of Led Zeppelin songs § Ten Years Gone
