= Trampled Under Foot =

- Netherlands single picture sleeve

Single by Led Zeppelin

from the album Physical Graffiti
- B-side: "Black Country Woman"
- Released: 2 April 1975 (US)
- Recorded: February 1974; April–May 1974
- Studio: Ronnie Lane Mobile Studio, Headley Grange, Hampshire; Olympic, London
- Genre: Hard rock; disco-rock; funk rock; funk metal
- Length: 5:38
- Label: Swan Song
- Songwriters: John Paul Jones; Jimmy Page; Robert Plant
- Producer: Jimmy Page

Led Zeppelin singles chronology
"D'yer Mak'er" (1973)	"Trampled Under Foot" (1975)	"Candy Store Rock" (1976)

Audio sample
- file; help

"Trampled Under Foot" is a song by the English rock group Led Zeppelin. A funk-influenced piece with John Paul Jones on clavinet, it was included on their 1975 album Physical Graffiti. The song was released as a single in several countries and was frequently performed in concert.

== Lyrics ==
The lyrics were inspired by blues musician Robert Johnson's 1936 song "Terraplane Blues". A Terraplane is a classic car, and the song uses car parts as metaphors for sex—"pump your gas", "rev all night", etc. The themes of these songs however differ; "Terraplane Blues" is about infidelity, while "Trampled Under Foot" is about giving in to sexual temptation.

== Composition and recording ==
The song evolved out of a jam session in 1972 and is credited to Robert Plant, Jimmy Page and John Paul Jones. Much rehearsal went into perfecting the relentless semi-funk riff that dominates this song. John Paul Jones has credited Stevie Wonder with the inspiration for the beat ("Superstition", 1972), which he played on a clavinet. Page played through a wah-wah pedal and, as producer, employed reverse echo on the recording.

== Reception and charts ==
Billboard described "Trampled Under Foot" as "the most commercial single [Led Zeppelin] put together in several years" and as having "a powerful staccatto beat." Cashbox called it a "high-powered effort" that "packs a punch that is sure to be felt on top of the charts." Record World said that "As Zeppelin-sanity begins to reach Beatlemaniacal proportions, the stage is set for the heavy metalmen to take their first single from Physical Graffiti to the top." Released in April 1975, it reached number 38 on the Billboard Hot 100.

Chart (1975)	Peak position
Australia (Kent Music Report)	60
Canada Top Singles (RPM)	41
US Billboard Hot 100	38
US Cashbox	28
US Record World	39

== Live performances and other versions ==
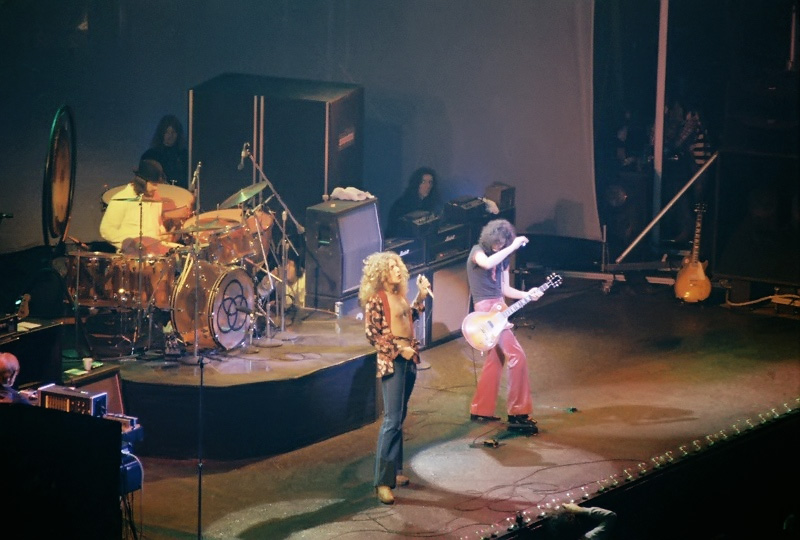
Page using a wah-wah pedal during a performance in Chicago (January 1975)

"Trampled Under Foot" became a standard part of Led Zeppelin concerts from 1975 onwards, being played on every tour until 1980. In 2012, the song was performed during the London Olympics opening ceremony as a part of a selected playlist.

A rough mix of the track with less overdubbing was titled "'Brandy & Coke' (Trampled Under Foot) [Initial Rough Mix]". It was released on 11 February 2015 (on iTunes), as part of the remastering process of all nine albums. The rest of the album was released on 23 February 2015.

== Personnel ==
According to Jean-Michel Guesdon and Philippe Margotin:

- Robert Plant – vocals
- Jimmy Page – electric guitars
- John Paul Jones – bass, Clavinet
- John Bonham – drums

== See also ==
- List of cover versions of Led Zeppelin songs
- List of Led Zeppelin songs written or inspired by others

== Bibliography ==
- Guesdon, Jean-Michel; Margotin, Philippe (2018). Led Zeppelin All the Songs: The Story Behind Every Track. Running Press. ISBN 978-0-316-448-67-3.
