= The Song Remains the Same (song) =

Song by Led Zeppelin

from the album Houses of the Holy
- Released: 28 March 1973
- Recorded: 1972
- Studio: Stargroves, East Woodhay, England
- Genre: Rock
- Length: 5:24
- Label: Atlantic
- Songwriters: Jimmy Page; Robert Plant
- Producer: Jimmy Page

Audio sample
- file; help

"The Song Remains the Same" is a song by the English rock group Led Zeppelin. It is the opening track from their 1973 album, Houses of the Holy.

== Composition ==
The song was originally an instrumental with the working title "The Overture". After singer Robert Plant added lyrics, it was temporarily known as "The Campaign" before becoming "The Song Remains the Same". In an interview he gave to Guitar World magazine in 1993, guitarist Jimmy Page discussed the song's construction:

It was originally going to be an instrumental – an overture that led into "The Rain Song". But I guess Robert had different ideas. You know, "This is pretty good, Better get some lyrics – quick!" [laughs] ... I had all the beginning material together, and Robert suggested that we break down into half-time in the middle. After we figured out that we were going to break it down, the song came together in a day ... I always had a cassette recorder around. That's how both "The Song Remains the Same" and "Stairway" came together – from bits of taped ideas.

Plant's vocal track was slightly sped up for the album release. Page played overdubs with a Telecaster on this recording, and also a Fender 12-string guitar.

== Performance and releases ==
The band first performed this song live on their 1972 Japanese Tour. Bootlegs from this tour reveal that the song was still without a settled title, with Plant introducing it as "Zep" from the stage at Tokyo. At Led Zeppelin concerts from late 1972 through 1975, "The Song Remains the Same" was followed (just as on the original album) by direct segue into "The Rain Song". For this live arrangement, Page employed his trademark Gibson EDS-1275 double-necked guitar. "The Song Remains the Same" was the opening song for the 1977 US tour and 1979 concerts, before being dropped from the set list for the 1980 European tour. The song was also performed at Led Zeppelin's reunion show at the O2 Arena, London on 10 December 2007.

"The Song Remains the Same" was featured on Led Zeppelin's 1976 concert film (and accompanying soundtrack), as part of Plant's fantasy sequence. The title of the song was used as the title of both the film and the album.

"The Song Remains The Same (Guitar Overdub Reference Mix)", an instrumental version of the song, appears on the second disc of the remastered 2-CD deluxe edition of Houses of the Holy. It was recorded on 18 May 1972, at the Rolling Stones Mobile Studio at Stargroves, with engineer Eddie Kramer and mix engineer George Chkiantz. It runs 5:30, while the original runs 5:24.

== Reception ==
In a contemporary review of Houses of the Holy, Gordon Fletcher of Rolling Stone gave "The Song Remains the Same" a mixed review, writing that the track is "the only other tune [on the album, except for "The Ocean"] approaching the Zep's past triumphs" and "works solely as a vehicle for Page's guitar antics".

In a retrospective review of Houses of the Holy (Deluxe Edition), Kristofer Lenz of Consequence of Sound gave "The Song Remains the Same" a more positive review, praising every band member and writing that "as the band moves through the many changes of “The Song Remains the Same”, they are tight yet nimble, proficient yet unpretentious."

== Personnel ==
According to Jean-Michel Guesdon and Philippe Margotin:

- Robert Plant – vocals
- Jimmy Page – electric guitars (six- and twelve-string)
- John Paul Jones – bass
- John Bonham – drums

== See also ==
- List of cover versions of Led Zeppelin songs – "The Song Remains the Same" entries

== Bibliography ==
- Guesdon, Jean-Michel; Margotin, Philippe (2018). Led Zeppelin All the Songs: The Story Behind Every Track. Running Press. ISBN 978-0-316-448-67-3.
