= Soundboard recording =

Sound recording of a concert

A soundboard recording is a sound recording of a concert taken from a direct connection to the soundboard at the venue. Soundboard recordings are considered to be among the highest quality bootleg recordings of live performancesthough some soundboard recordings may have an off-balance audio mix because guitar amplifiers and other loud sounds on stage do not need so much amplification in the main loudspeaker system.

Because access is required to sensitive equipment to make the recording, most soundboard recordings are authorized in some way either through a liberal policy on the part of the artists or specific permission granted to production staff. Though many soundboard recordings are only available as bootlegs, some are eventually released as legitimate live albums.
