= Moby Dick (instrumental) =

- Italian single label with "Gallows Pole" on the flipside

Instrumental by Led Zeppelin

from the album Led Zeppelin II
- Released: 22 October 1969
- Recorded: 4–5 May 1969; 6 May 1969; 3 June 1969
- Studio: Mystic Sound Studios, Hollywood, California; Mirror Sound, Los Angeles; Mayfair Recording Studios, New York
- Genre: Blues rock; hard rock
- Length: 4:25
- Label: Atlantic
- Composers: John Bonham; John Paul Jones; Jimmy Page
- Producer: Jimmy Page

Audio
- "Moby Dick" on YouTube

"Moby Dick" is an instrumental, featuring a prominent drum solo, by English rock band Led Zeppelin, track eight on the band's 1969 album Led Zeppelin II. Named after the 1851 novel of the same name by Herman Melville, it was also known by the alternative titles "Pat's Delight" (early 1968–1969 version with completely different guitar riff) and "Over the Top" (with "Out on the Tiles" intro section and original closing reprise) during various points of the band's career. The track is often regarded as one of the greatest drum solos of all time.

== Composition and recording ==
Music journalist Steve Pilkington described "Moby Dick" as "essentially, a drum solo bookended by a token blues-rock riff."

The track emerged after Led Zeppelin guitarist and producer Jimmy Page found drummer John Bonham jamming or improvising in the studio, recorded parts of his solos and pieced it all together. Studio outtakes from the Led Zeppelin II sessions reveal that the drum solo recorded was edited down from a much longer version.

The guitar riff can be traced back to the BBC unused session track "The Girl I Love She Got Long Black Wavy Hair", which was recorded in the summer of 1969. The riff is also similar to that of Bobby Parker's 1961 hit single "Watch Your Step", although the progression is in a different key and tempo.

== Personnel ==
According to Jean-Michel Guesdon and Philippe Margotin:

- Jimmy Page – guitars
- John Paul Jones – bass
- John Bonham – drums, cowbell, tambourine

== Live performances ==
Bonham's drum solo was often played at Led Zeppelin concerts beginning on their first North American tour in November 1968 and remained his solo performance showcase on concert tours until their last North American in 1977. When played live, Bonham's drum solo would last as little as 6 minutes or, more frequently, as long as 30 minutes, while the rest of the band would leave the stage after having played the introduction.

During this period, the drum showpiece took different names and featured different musical structures. On their early tours, it was known as "Pat's Delight" (a reference to Bonham's wife). "Pat's Delight" featured a different riff than that of "Moby Dick", but was a similar blues structured riff and later evolved into the final version featured on Led Zeppelin II. From 1969 to 1975, live performances of the song had much more resemblance to the studio recording with the main riff played at the beginning and the end of the song. During Led Zeppelin's 1977 North American Tour, Bonham's drum feature was renamed "Over the Top" in which the solo began with the opening riff to "Out on the Tiles" from Led Zeppelin III before segueing into the usual lengthy drum solo. The last time "Moby Dick" was played by Led Zeppelin was on 17 July 1977 at the Seattle Kingdome and can be found on various audio and video bootleg recordings. Led Zeppelin later performed on tour in Europe in the summer of 1980 and played a few select dates in the UK the preceding year, but the song was not performed at any of those dates.

There are several live versions of "Moby Dick" that have been officially released. The earliest recorded official release was played at the Olympia in Paris, France on 10 October, 1969. It was subsequently included on disc two of the deluxe edition of Led Zeppelin, along with the rest of the show. The first official release of a live version was included in the film The Song Remains the Same and the soundtrack of the same name. The original album and film versions include different performances from the 3 nights performed at Madison Square Garden from 27-29 July, 1973. Other versions officially released include a filmed performance from the Royal Albert Hall from 9 January, 1970 (featured on Led Zeppelin DVD) and a performance from the LA Forum on 25 June, 1972 (featured on the live album How the West Was Won).

== See also ==
- List of cover versions of Led Zeppelin songs
- List of Led Zeppelin songs written or inspired by others
- Led Zeppelin discography
