= Kia Forum =

Indoor arena in Inglewood, California, U.S.

- The Forum; Los Angeles Forum; The Fabulous Forum

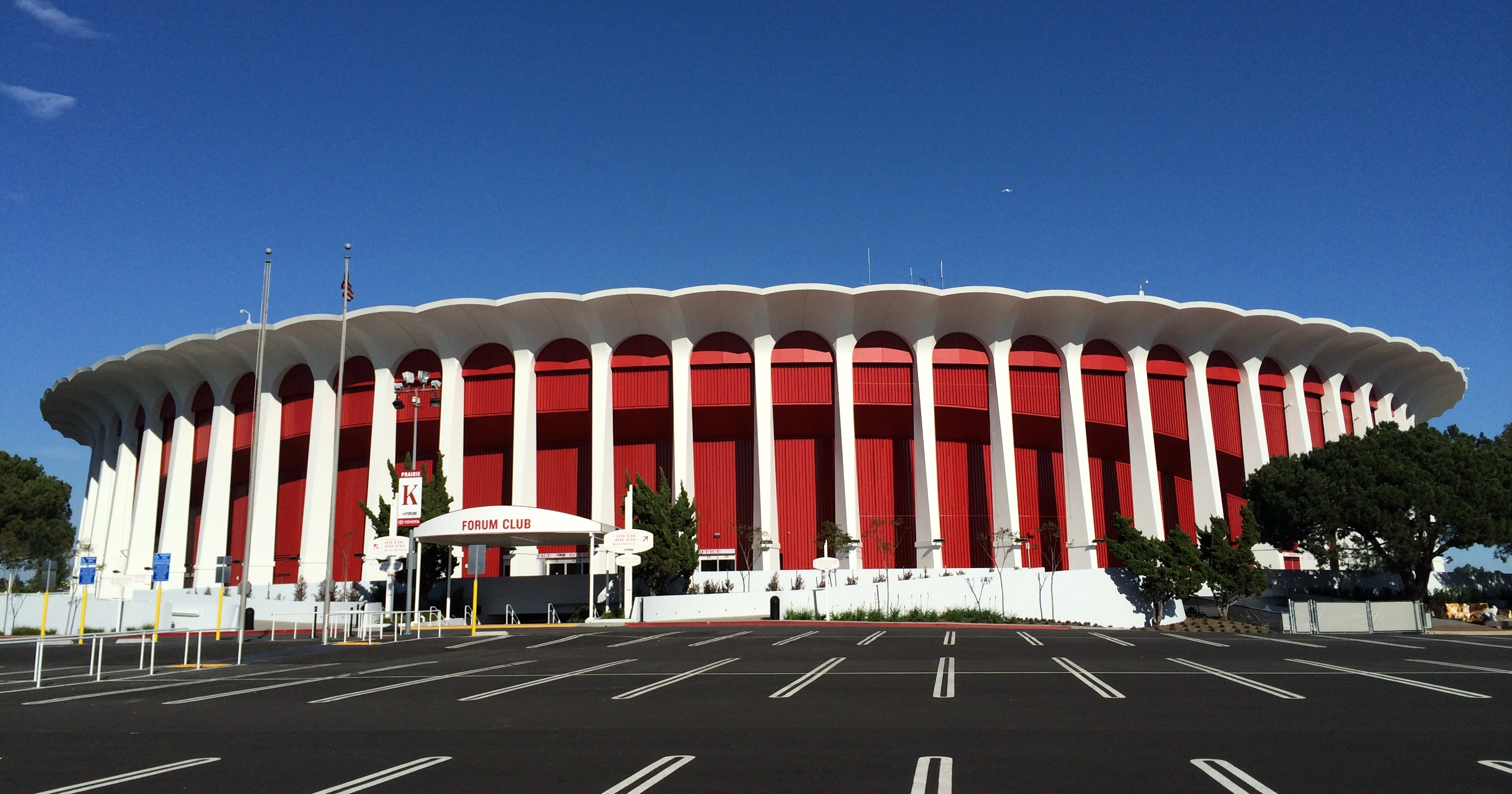
- The Kia Forum

- Location in the Greater Los Angeles area Location in California Location in the United States Location in North America
- Interactive map of Kia Forum
- Former names: The Forum (1967–1988, 2004–2012); Great Western Forum (1988–2003); The Forum presented by Chase (2014–2022)
- Address: 3900 West Manchester Boulevard
- Location: Inglewood, California, U.S.
- Coordinates: 33°57′30″N 118°20′30″W
- Owner: Steve Ballmer
- Capacity: 17,500; Ice hockey: 16,005
- Public transit: Downtown Inglewood; Metro Local 212 from Hawthorne/Lennox

Construction
- Groundbreaking: July 1, 1966; 60 years ago
- Opened: December 30, 1967; 58 years ago
- Renovated: 1988, 2012–2014
- Cost: US$16 million ($154 million in 2025 dollars); 2014 renovation: $76.5 million
- Architects: Charles Luckman Associates (original); Brisbin Brook Beynon (renovation)
- Structural engineers: Johnson & Nielsen Associates (original); Severud Associates (renovation)
- General contractors: C.L. Peck Contractors (original); Clark Construction (renovation)

Tenants
- Los Angeles Lakers (NBA) (1967–1999); Los Angeles Kings (NHL) (1967–1999); Los Angeles Strings (WTT) (1975–1978); Los Angeles Aztecs (NASL) (1979–1980); Los Angeles Strings (WTT) (1981–1993); Los Angeles Lazers (MISL) (1982–1989); Los Angeles United (CISL) (1993); Los Angeles Blades (RHI) (1993–1997); Los Angeles Sparks (WNBA) (1997–2000); Los Angeles Stars (ABA) (2000–2001)

Website
- thekiaforum.com
- Forum
- U.S. National Register of Historic Places
- NRHP reference No.: 14000661
- Added to NRHP: September 24, 2014; 12 years ago

The Kia Forum, also known simply as The Forum, is a multi-purpose indoor arena in Inglewood, California, part of the Los Angeles area. Located on West Manchester Boulevard, with Pincay Drive to the south and between Kareem Court and Prairie Avenue to the east and west, it is north of SoFi Stadium, Intuit Dome, and the Hollywood Park Casino, and about 3 miles (4.8 km) east of Los Angeles International Airport (LAX).

The Forum opened on December 30, 1967. Architect Charles Luckman's vision was realized by engineers Carl Johnson and Svend Nielsen. It was a groundbreaking structure without extensive internal support pillars that was unique in an indoor arena the size of the Forum. The arena's roof, a cable-suspended structure, has a diameter of approximately 407 feet (124 meters).

From 1967 to 1999, the Forum was home to the Los Angeles Lakers of the National Basketball Association (NBA) and the Los Angeles Kings of the National Hockey League (NHL) before both teams joined the NBA's Los Angeles Clippers at Crypto.com Arena, then known as Staples Center. From 1997 to 2001, the Forum was also the home of the WNBA's Los Angeles Sparks until they moved to Crypto.com Arena as well.

Alongside Madison Square Garden in New York City, the Forum has been considered one of the best-known indoor sports venues in the U.S., largely due to the Lakers' success and the Hollywood celebrities often seen there. It was the site of the 1972 and 1983 NBA All-Star Games, the 1981 NHL All-Star Game, 1984 Olympic basketball, and the Big West Conference (from 1983 to 1988) and 1989 Pacific-10 Conference men's basketball tournaments. The venue has also hosted tennis and boxing matches, as well as major music concerts and political events.

In 2000, the Forum was acquired by the Faithful Central Bible Church, who used it for occasional church services and leased it for sporting, concerts, and other events. In 2012, the Forum was purchased by the Madison Square Garden Company (MSG), for $23.5 million; MSG announced plans to renovate the arena as a world-class concert venue. On September 24, 2014, the Forum was listed on the National Register of Historic Places. On March 24, 2020, Los Angeles Clippers owner Steve Ballmer purchased The Forum from MSG for $400 million.

The Forum has previously been known as the Great Western Forum, as well as The Forum presented by Chase, and was nicknamed The Fabulous Forum by long-time Lakers play-by-play announcer Chick Hearn. It is also known informally as the LA Forum to distinguish it from other places with the name "Forum".

== History ==
=== 1960s and 1970s ===
On the site of a former golf course, the "fabulous" Forum (as it was colloquially known to locals) was built in 1967 by Jack Kent Cooke (owner of the Lakers and founding owner of the Kings). The Canadian Cooke, who enjoyed ice hockey, was determined to bring the National Hockey League (NHL) to Los Angeles. In 1966, the NHL announced that it was adding six new franchises for 1967, and Cooke prepared a bid. The Los Angeles Memorial Coliseum Commission, which operated the Los Angeles Memorial Sports Arena, supported a competing bid headed by Los Angeles Rams owner Dan Reeves—who already had a hockey team at the Arena, the Western Hockey League's Los Angeles Blades. The Commission told Cooke that if he won the franchise, he would not be allowed to use the facility.

In response, Cooke planned to build a new arena in the Los Angeles suburb of Inglewood. Nearly 30 years later, Cooke told Los Angeles Times sportswriter Steve Springer that he remembered "one official representing the commission laughing at him" when Cooke said he would build in Inglewood. Cooke won the franchise, paying $2 million for the Los Angeles club, which he called the Kings. According to Springer, "Cooke went to Inglewood and built the Forum. Goodbye, Lakers. Goodbye, Kings." The round, $16 million building was designed by Los Angeles architect Charles Luckman to be "reminiscent of Roman coliseums." The arena seats 17,505 for basketball, 16,005 for hockey and up to 18,000 for musical concerts; although it has no luxury suites, it had 2,400 club seats for events. More than 70% of the seats are between the goals, and no seat is more than 170 feet (52 m) from the playing surface. The first Kings game at the arena took place on December 30, 1967, as an 0–2 loss to the Philadelphia Flyers. The first Lakers game at the arena took place on December 31, 1967, as a 147–118 victory against the San Diego Rockets.

During the Cooke era, the Forum hosted five NBA Finals in its first six years (1967–1973). The Boston Celtics celebrated both the 1968 and 1969 championships in the arena, the latter of which marked the final games Bill Russell ever played. The Lakers won the 1972 NBA Finals at the Forum in Game 5, while the New York Knicks' second championship was clinched in a Game 5 at the same venue in the 1973 NBA Finals the following season.

Cream played two shows during the band's farewell tour, on October 18–19, 1968, with Deep Purple as the opening act. The band's show of October 19 produced the live tracks on their farewell LP, Goodbye. Deep Purple also recorded their part of the show, which was later released as a live album entitled Inglewood – Live in California. The Jimi Hendrix Experience performed at the Forum for the first time on April 26, 1969. A soundboard recording of this concert has been officially released: Los Angeles Forum: April 26, 1969 (Live). Opening acts for this sold-out concert were Cat Mother and Chicago. The Experience later performed there again the following year on April 25, 1970, as part of their final U.S. tour. The concert has been widely circulated thanks to 3 available bootleg audience recordings. Crosby, Stills, Nash & Young recorded shows in June and July 1970, including at the Forum. Some of them ended up on their 1971 live album, 4 Way Street. The Rolling Stones performed at the Forum during their 1969, 1972 and 1975 North American tours. Steppenwolf played there during their At Your Birthday Party tour on July 14, 1969, with Three Dog Night as the opening act. Three Dog Night recorded their set, which was later released as a live album entitled Captured Live at the Forum.

Queen played a total of 12 concerts from 1977 to 1982, including their final U.S. concert with Freddie Mercury on September 15, 1982. David Bowie played concerts here on April 3, 4, and 6, 1978. Chicago played two long sets in front of nearly 18,000 people as the headline act on April 24, 1971. This performance was two weeks after their historic week-long sellout at Carnegie Hall where they played eight shows in six days from April 5 to 10, 1971. The Grateful Dead performed at the Forum during their vaunted Spring 1977 tour, as well as three-night runs in February and December 1989. Between 1970 and 1977, Led Zeppelin performed 16 times at the Forum, including a run of six sold-out dates in 1977. Part of their live album, How the West Was Won, was recorded at the arena. The band's first 1977 show is the source of the bootleg Listen to This Eddie. Another bootleg from the Forum shows, For Badgeholders Only, contains one of the last live performances by Keith Moon on drums, with his surprise performance there. The Jackson 5 performed numerous times at the Forum between 1970 and 1981. The 1970 show broke attendance records, with 18,675 paid admissions and a gross income of $105,000 (when the Jackson 5 had released two albums and three singles). By 1972, they had released seven albums on Motown, in addition to Michael and Jermaine Jackson's solo albums. Both shows were recorded and released as Live at the Forum.

On November 14, 1970, Elvis Presley played afternoon and evening shows, with 18,700 and 18,698 paid admissions. He returned for two more sold-out shows on May 11, 1974, with 18,500 paid admissions each. The Osmonds performed two shows on December 4, 1971, which were recorded and released as The Osmonds Live. Barbra Streisand performed on April 15, 1972, during Four for McGovern, a fundraiser for George McGovern's presidential campaign. Although ticket prices ranged from $5.50 to $100 and the event grossed $300,000, after expenses were deducted McGovern's campaign received only $18,000. During her set, Streisand asked the audience to choose between "Second Hand Rose" and "Stoney End" for her next song; the latter was the overwhelming choice. Her performance was recorded and released as Live Concert at the Forum.

Bob Dylan's live album Before the Flood with The Band was compiled from songs performed at the Forum over the course of three shows on February 13 and 14, 1974. The only song on the album not recorded at the Forum was "Knockin' on Heaven's Door", which was recorded in New York City. Jethro Tull played five sold-out shows in a seven-day stretch in 1975, here at The Forum. The dates were February 3+4, 8–10.

Kiss had their debut there in 1976 on February 23 for two consecutive nights, three days after getting their footprints outside Grauman's Chinese Theatre in Hollywood and played three more consecutive nights shows the following year, 1977, on August 26–28 (the first of these shows sold out), with live tracks from these 1977 shows included on their second live album, Alive II, released in October of that same year. On June 21, 1976, Paul McCartney and Wings began a three-night stand at the Forum during their Wings Over the World tour. The shows were McCartney's first live performances in Los Angeles since he played at the Hollywood Bowl in 1964 and 1965 with the Beatles. Some songs played at the Forum appeared on the Wings Over America live LP released later that year and re-released in 2013.

The Eagles performed three shows during their Hotel California tour on October 20–22, 1976. The shows were recorded, with some songs appearing on Eagles Live. The Bee Gees appeared at the Forum during their Children of the World tour on December 20, 1976; the show was recorded and released as Here at Last... Bee Gees... Live. Parliament-Funkadelic recorded half of their live album, Live: P-Funk Earth Tour, at the arena on January 19, 1977. Alice Cooper brought his big productions of Billion Dollar Babies, Welcome To My Nightmare and Mad House Rock to the Forum.

The Los Angeles Strings of the World Team Tennis league played home matches at the Forum from 1975 to 1978, led on the court by Chris Evert. The team was owned by Los Angeles businessman Jerry Buss. The Forum hosted several boxing fights, most notably the second Muhammad Ali vs. Ken Norton on September 10, 1973. Several events featured Latin American fighters like José Nápoles, Chucho Castillo, Rubén Olivares, Carlos Zárate Serna and Alfonso Zamora. In 1979, Cooke sold the Forum, the Lakers and the Kings to Buss for a then-record $67.5 million.

=== 1980s ===
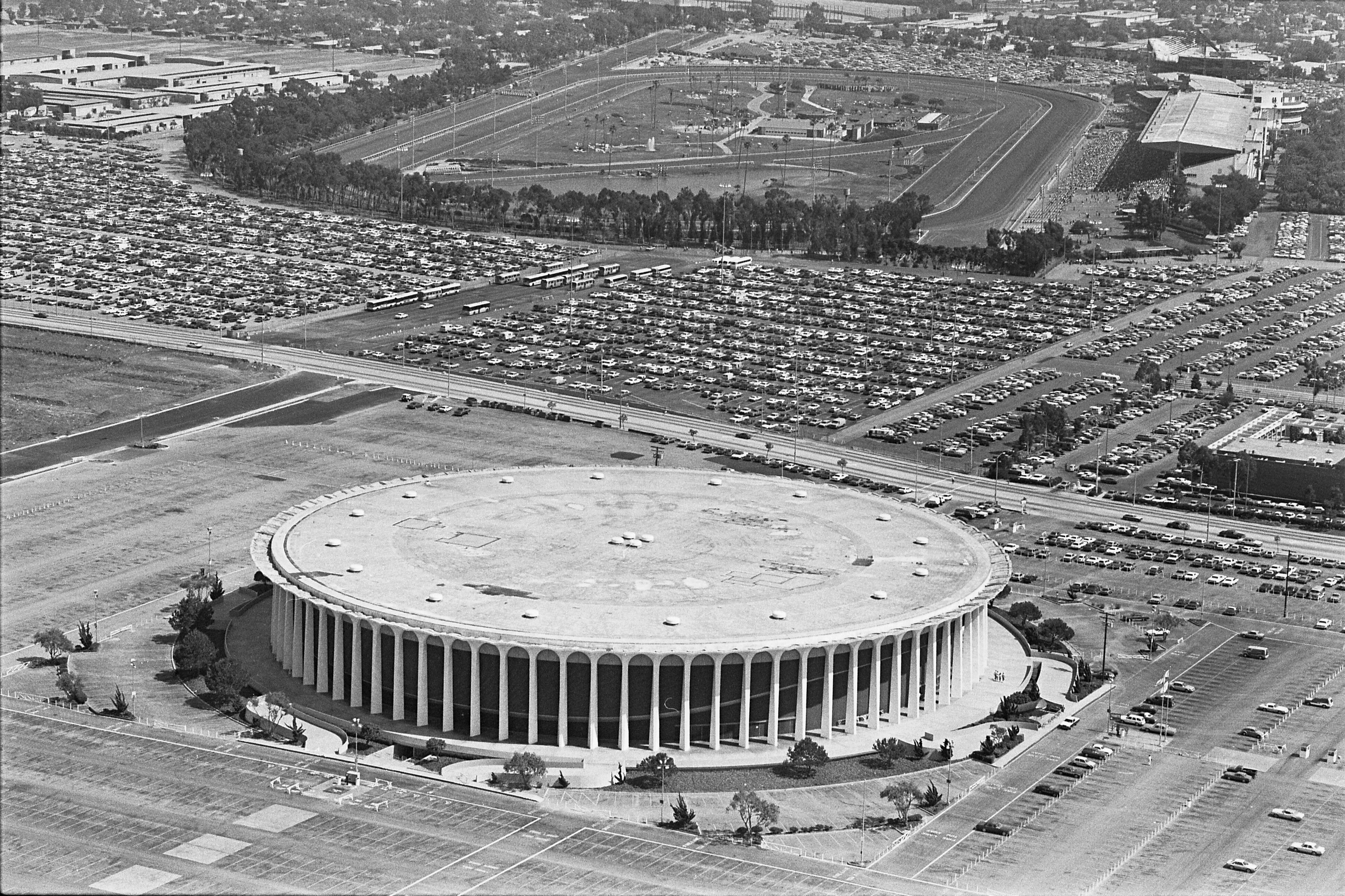
Aerial view of the Forum and Hollywood Park

The Lakers were successful during the 1980s with their Showtime era, winning five NBA championships and making the NBA Finals every year except 1981 and 1986. They won the 1982, 1987 and 1988 championships at the Forum. The Philadelphia 76ers and Detroit Pistons were the only visiting teams to win a championship at the Forum during this period; both teams clinched the title in a Game 4 sweep in 1983 and 1989 respectively. The Lakers' owner, Jerry Buss, also purchased the Los Angeles Strings expansion franchise of the second incarnation of TeamTennis (the original team and league having folded in 1978) and appointed his 19-year-old daughter Jeanie Buss as the tennis team's general manager, with all home matches played at the Forum.

In 1981, Diana Ross filmed the concert portion of her Diana television special at the Forum, entering the arena through the audience and singing her 1980 Billboard top-five hit "I'm Coming Out". Guests included Quincy Jones (who conducted a performance of "Home" from The Wiz) and Michael Jackson, who joined Ross onstage for a performance of her 1980 number-one song "Upside Down". The special began with Ross in a photo session atop the Forum in a silver lamé bodysuit with large, silver-lamé wings. On December 10, 1981, Devo performed at the Forum during their New Traditionalists tour. In April 1982, the Forum was the site of the "Miracle on Manchester", in which the Kings overcame a 5–0 deficit in a first-round Stanley Cup playoff game against the Edmonton Oilers to win 6–5 in overtime. With additional upset wins in Games 1 and 5 of the five-game series, the Kings eliminated the heavily favored Oilers to reach the second round.

In September 1982, on their Hot Space Tour, Queen played their final U.S. concert ever at the Forum. Fleetwood Mac played two shows during its Mirage tour on October 21–22, 1982, with Dave Mason opening. The shows, originally scheduled for October 4–5, were postponed when Stevie Nicks developed walking pneumonia. They were recorded for the band's tour video, which was televised in 1983. In 1984, the Forum hosted the basketball tournaments and the men's handball finals of the 1984 Summer Olympics. The arena hosted Amnesty International's June 6, 1986 A Conspiracy of Hope benefit concert, headlined by U2 and Sting and featuring Bryan Adams, Jackson Browne, Peter Gabriel, Lou Reed, Joan Baez and the Neville Brothers.

Sting played the Dream of the Blue Turtles Tour on June 6, 1986, and the Nothing Like the Sun Tour on March 21 and 22, 1988. Genesis played five consecutive sold out concerts at the Forum from October 13 to 17, 1986, during the first leg of their Invisible Touch Tour. On September 30, 1987, former Pink Floyd member Roger Waters played the Forum on the US leg of his Radio K.A.O.S. tour. Iron Maiden performed on July 12, 1988. Rock bands AC/DC and Cinderella performed on November 13, 1988. Mexican boxer Julio César Chávez fought at the venue against Ruben Castillo in 1995, Vernon Buchanan in 1988 and Roger Mayweather in 1989. In 1989, Neil Diamond set the all-time attendance record at the Forum by surpassing his already leading record of seven sold-out shows (in 1983) with 10 sold-out shows. For doing so, Diamond was presented with a gold plaque, stating his accomplishment(s).

=== Great Western era ===
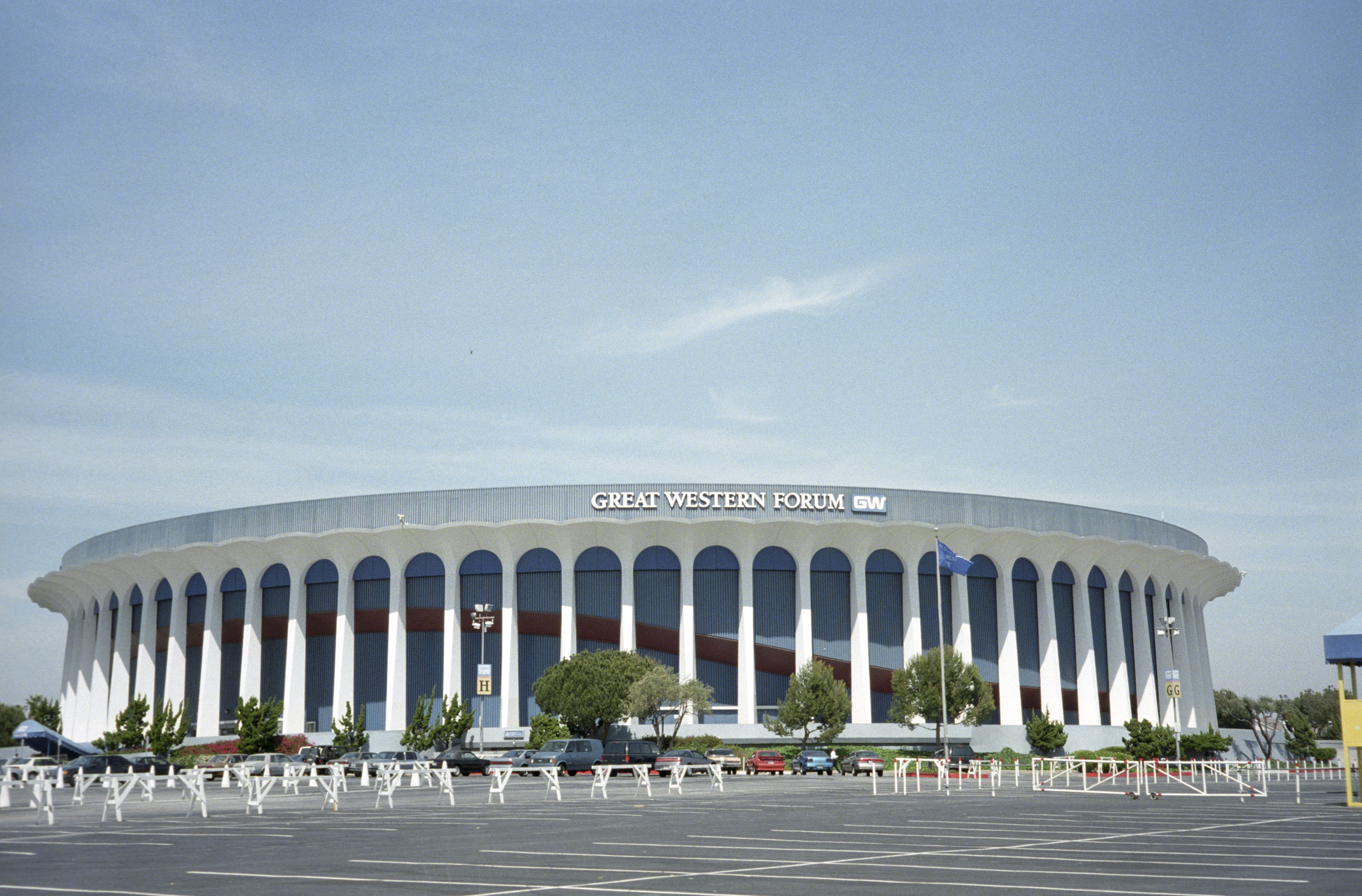
Great Western Forum exterior

On December 5, 1988, it was announced that Jerry Buss sold the arena's naming rights to Great Western Savings & Loan, coinciding with the arrival in Los Angeles of hockey star Wayne Gretzky. The building exterior was repainted blue, replacing its original "California sunset red." It was renamed the Great Western Forum; the name was retained for several years, even after Great Western was acquired by Washington Mutual (now Chase) and ceased to exist. Although naming-rights agreements are now commonplace in major American sports, they were rare at the time of Buss's deal with Great Western. There was some initial criticism of the name change, and local residents continued to call the arena "the Forum." Adverse reaction was eventually muted as the Great Western Forum monicker proved to be a natural fit for the venue, which was at the time the highest-profile arena in the western United States's largest population center.

=== 1990s ===
Before the 1991–92 NBA and NHL seasons, a new scoreboard was installed, replacing the one in use since the building opened in 1967. The original scoreboard, designed by All American Scoreboards in Pardeeville, Wisconsin, had a two-line message board on each side (the third electronic message board in the NHL, and the second in the NBA). The new scoreboard, designed by Daktronics, kept the two-line message boards and added a Sony Jumbotron scoreboard on each side.

The Forum hosted the 1991 NBA Finals and was the site of the Chicago Bulls' first NBA championship victory. It also hosted games three and four of the 1993 Stanley Cup Final between the Kings and Montreal Canadiens, the only time the Stanley Cup Final was held at the arena. Coincidentally, Montreal's home rink at the time was also called the Forum.

By the middle of the decade, the Great Western Forum was considered too small; it lacked luxury boxes and had insufficient retail and commercial space. Los Angeles officials, seeking to redevelop the city center, began planning a new downtown sports arena and entertainment complex and hoped to attract the Lakers and Kings from Inglewood.

The Kings' owners, who were real-estate developers, agreed to develop the complex; Buss agreed to move the Lakers into the new arena as co-tenants with the Kings and a third tenant, the NBA's Clippers, who would move there from the Los Angeles Memorial Sports Arena. The new Staples Center (now Crypto.com Arena) opened on October 17, 1999; as part of the deal, Buss sold the Great Western Forum to the L. A. Arena Company (which was controlled by the Kings' owners).

=== Final games ===
The Kings' final postseason game at the Forum, a 2–1 loss to the St. Louis Blues, was played on April 29, 1998. The Kings played their final regular season NHL game at the Forum, a 3–2 loss to the St. Louis Blues, on April 18, 1999. Coincidentally, Wayne Gretzky, who had previously played for both teams, played his final NHL game (as a member of the New York Rangers) on the same day. The Kings' final game at the Forum was an 8–1 preseason win over the Mighty Ducks of Anaheim on September 20, 1999. As the Staples Center had not yet opened, the Kings played their remaining preseason home games at the San Diego Sports Arena and the MGM Grand Garden Arena in Las Vegas. The Lakers played their last regular season NBA game at the Forum, 119–91 victory against the Portland Trail Blazers, on May 5, 1999. The Lakers' 118–107 playoff loss to the NBA champion San Antonio Spurs on May 23, 1999, was their last postseason game played at the Forum. The Lakers played two preseason games at the Forum before the 1999–2000 season before moving to the Staples Center.

=== 2000s ===
The Los Angeles Sparks played their 2000 season at the arena before following the Lakers and Clippers to Staples Center. The Great Western Forum hosted live events, offices and training facilities for the 2000–2001 Women of Wrestling season.

Faithful Central Bible Church, with a congregation of over 12,000, purchased the Great Western Forum at the end of 2000 and began holding church services there on Sunday mornings. Unlike Houston's Lakewood Church, which converted the former Summit into their church, Faithful Central representatives said that they never intended to convert the arena for religious purposes; in 2009, the church discontinued their regular use of the Forum for services.

During the Faithful Central ownership, the arena was available for concerts, sporting events and other activities requiring a large venue. It was owned by the church's for-profit entity, Forum Enterprises, which accommodated secular and pop-music artists. The church influenced the approval of performers, however; in 2005 and 2009 the Forum refused to allow performances by heavy metal band Lamb of God, whose former name was Burn the Priest.

On February 14, 2003, Phish began their first post-hiatus tour at the Forum. A fan jumped onstage during "AC/DC Bag", and they performed a cover of Dr. Hook & the Medicine Show's "The Cover of Rolling Stone" after appearing on the magazine's cover.

In 2003, Great Western's naming-rights contract on the building expired (despite being bought by Washington Mutual in 1997, their name had been retained in the interim), and Forum Enterprises changed the venue's name back to "the Forum". The Great Western corporate logo and the words "Great Western" remained on portions of the exterior, including the roof (with a logo visible to planes landing at LAX), and were slowly removed over time. The roof, which was the last part of the building to contain the "GW" logo and "Great Western Forum" name, would not be repainted until the MSG remodeling, when it was overlaid with the new "Forum Presented by Chase" logo.

In 2004, Madonna premiered the Re-Invention World Tour at the Forum, which was filmed for the documentary I'm Going To Tell You A Secret.

The Forum was made available for film use, including interior shots for the 2002 film Like Mike. The Foo Fighters used the building as a setting for the music video for "All My Life" in 2003, featuring the building's exterior in its opening and closing shots. In 2008, a scene for the 2009 film Hannah Montana: The Movie and the video for Weezer's "Troublemaker" (from their 2008 Red Album) were filmed outside the Forum.

Iron Maiden appeared during their Somewhere Back in Time World Tour on February 19, 2008, with Lauren Harris their opening act. Their live version of "The Number of the Beast" was included on the documentary Iron Maiden: Flight 666.

In June 2009, Michael Jackson rehearsed at the Forum for his This Is It concert series in London. After Jackson died on June 25, 2009, footage of these rehearsals and those at Staples Center became part of Michael Jackson's This Is It.

On October 9, 2009, the Lakers returned to the Forum for a preseason game against the Golden State Warriors to celebrate the team's 50th season in Los Angeles; the Lakers lost, 110–91.

=== 2010s: MSG era ===
In 2011, Prince began a 21-show run at the Forum. After acquiring the arena in June 2012, the Madison Square Garden Company announced plans for a $50 million renovation. The City of Inglewood made an $18 million commercial-rehabilitation loan, contingent on MSG's $50 million investment. The arena was renamed "The Forum, presented by Chase" to reflect its sponsor, Chase Bank (which had incidentally purchased Great Western's legal successor, Washington Mutual, a few years earlier), and its exterior returned to the original red. New features also included new lighting, new seating, LED video systems and HD screen and new retail.

==== Events after reopening ====
The Forum reopened with six concerts by the Eagles during their History of the Eagles – Live in Concert tour on January 15, 17, 18, 22, 24 and 25, 2014. On March 15–16, the Forum hosted the men's freestyle wrestling World Cup.

On May 17, 2014, the Forum hosted its first boxing card since 2001. Mexican Juan Manuel Márquez defeated Mike Alvarado for the WBO international welterweight championship, for the right to challenge world champion Manny Pacquiao. The event was broadcast by HBO's Boxing After Dark, the first time since its 1996 premiere that the series presented a card from the Forum. On May 16, 2015, Gennady Golovkin defeated Willie Monroe Jr. during a live broadcast on HBO Boxing. Golovkin returned the following year on April 23, 2016, to battle Dominic Wade, which resulted in a second-round KO.

On August 24, 2014, the arena hosted the 2014 MTV Video Music Awards, the first major awards show at the Forum. The arena was added to the National Register of Historic Places on September 24, 2014.

The Foo Fighters performed on January 10, 2015, to celebrate singer Dave Grohl's 46th birthday. Paul Stanley from Kiss, Tenacious D, Slash, Alice Cooper, Zakk Wylde, Perry Farrell, Trombone Shorty, David Lee Roth, and Motörhead's Lemmy all got up and performed with the band.

On August 1, 2015, to complete their R40 Live Tour, Canadian rock band Rush performed their final concert at the Forum.

On March 27, 2016, former Pink Floyd member David Gilmour played his first ever concert at the Forum as the third show on the US leg of his Rattle That Lock Tour.

On June 4, 2016, the UFC 199 mixed martial arts event was held at The Forum.

The Chicks (then known as the Dixie Chicks) played at the Forum on October 8, 2016, as part of their DCX MMXVI World Tour. The performance was filmed and later released on DVD.

The Forum was the venue of the 2015, 2016 and 2018 Nickelodeon Kids' Choice Awards. In addition, the Forum hosted the 2016, 2017, and 2018 iHeartRadio Music Awards, 2016 American Country Countdown Awards and the 2016 and 2018 Teen Choice Awards.

Juan Gabriel performed the final concert of his career on August 26, 2016, dying two days later.

Kanye West performed six sold-out shows on October 25–27 and November 1–3, 2016, as a part of his Saint Pablo Tour.

It hosted the 2017 MTV Video Music Awards on August 27, 2017.

On February 24, 2018, the Forum hosted the world championship Super Flyweight boxing match between Juan Francisco Estrada and Srisaket Sor Rungvisai.

The Forum has also hosted the KROQ Almost Acoustic Christmas since 2014.

On December 29, 2018, the UFC 232 mixed martial arts event was held at the Forum as part of a short notice decision.

On April 4, 2019, the Mexican promotion Lucha Libre AAA Worldwide announced that its second event named AAA Invading LA in the United States with the event being its professional wrestling event in the venue.

On April 6, 2019, Iranian singer Hamed Homayoun held a concert for 14,000 people at the venue, a record for all Iranian singers who have performed here, including Mohammad-Reza Shajarian and Ebi. Forum management mentioned this performance as one of the venue's most memorable, and prepared a cake with Homayoun's image to commemorate the event.

On October 11, 2019, Japanese kawaii metal band Babymetal performed at The Forum, making them the first Japanese band to headline the arena. The show is part of the Metal Galaxy World Tour 2019, a promotional tour for the group's third album Metal Galaxy, which released on October 11, 2019; simultaneously with the show.

On November 29 and 30, 2019, American thrash metal band Slayer performed at the Forum, this event being their final show as the band headlined the arena on the Slayer Farewell Tour.

=== 2020s: Acquisition by Steve Ballmer ===
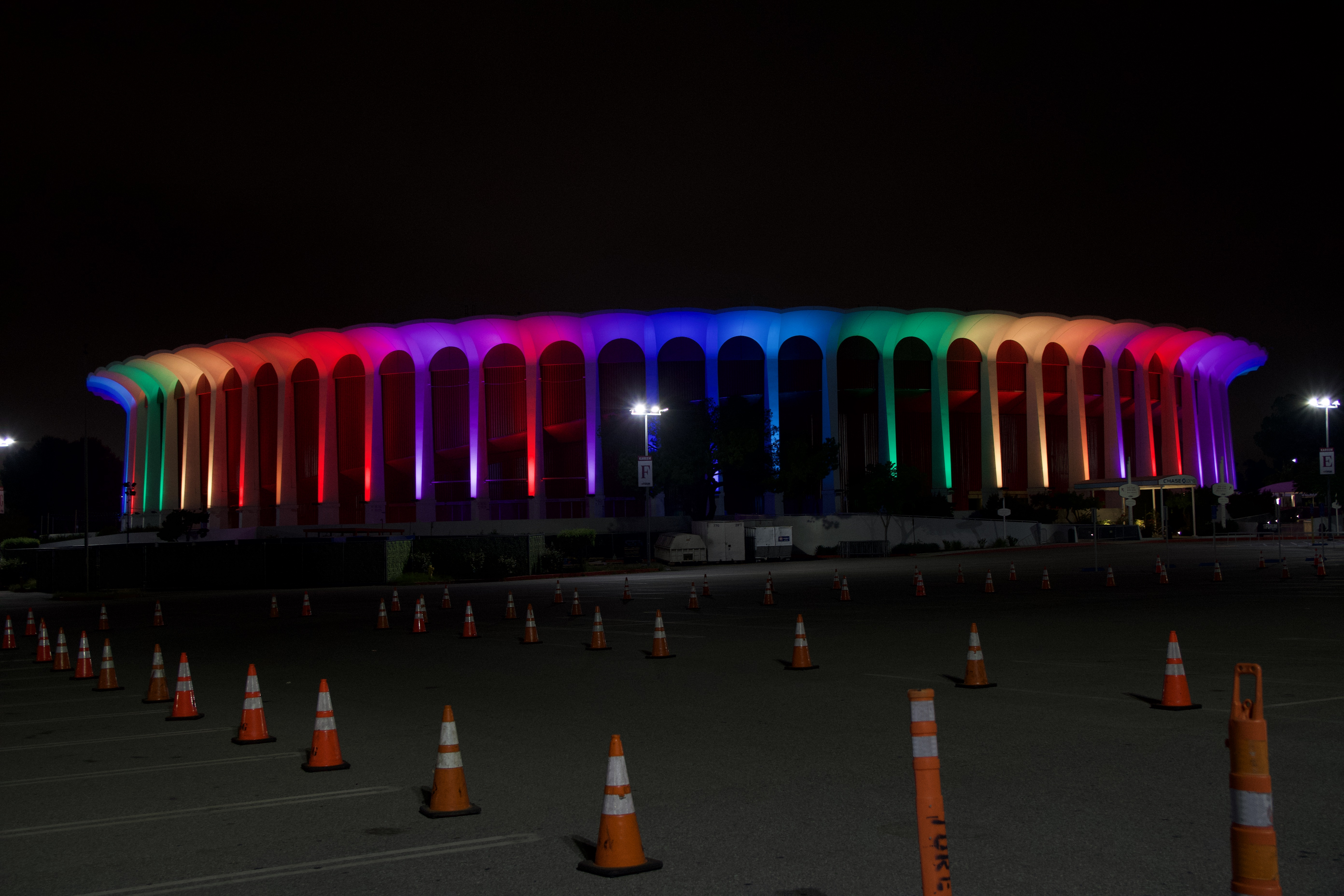
The Forum at night in June 2020

On March 24, 2020, Clippers owner Steve Ballmer announced that he had agreed to acquire the Forum from MSG for $400 million. The acquisition was needed in order to enable the construction of the Clippers' new Intuit Dome in Inglewood; the Clippers accused MSG of using litigation to block construction of the new arena, which they feared would cannibalize the Forum's live events business.

The venue was closed from March 2020 to July 31, 2021, due to COVID-19. The Forum reopened on July 31, 2021, hosting Bellator 263. A concert by the Foo Fighters on July 17, 2021, was originally scheduled to be its first event, but it was postponed due to COVID-19 cases within the band's staff.

In February 2022, it was announced that All Elite Wrestling (AEW) would host a live broadcast of Dynamite from the Forum on June 1, 2022, marking its first professional wrestling event since 2015. In August 2023, it was announced that AEW would host Full Gear at the Forum on November 18, 2023. The event would be preceded by special episodes of its weekly shows Rampage and Collision (the latter being a special Friday-night edition due to the PPV being on a Saturday) on November 17.

On March 22 and 23, Dua Lipa performed two sold-out shows as part of her Future Nostalgia Tour.

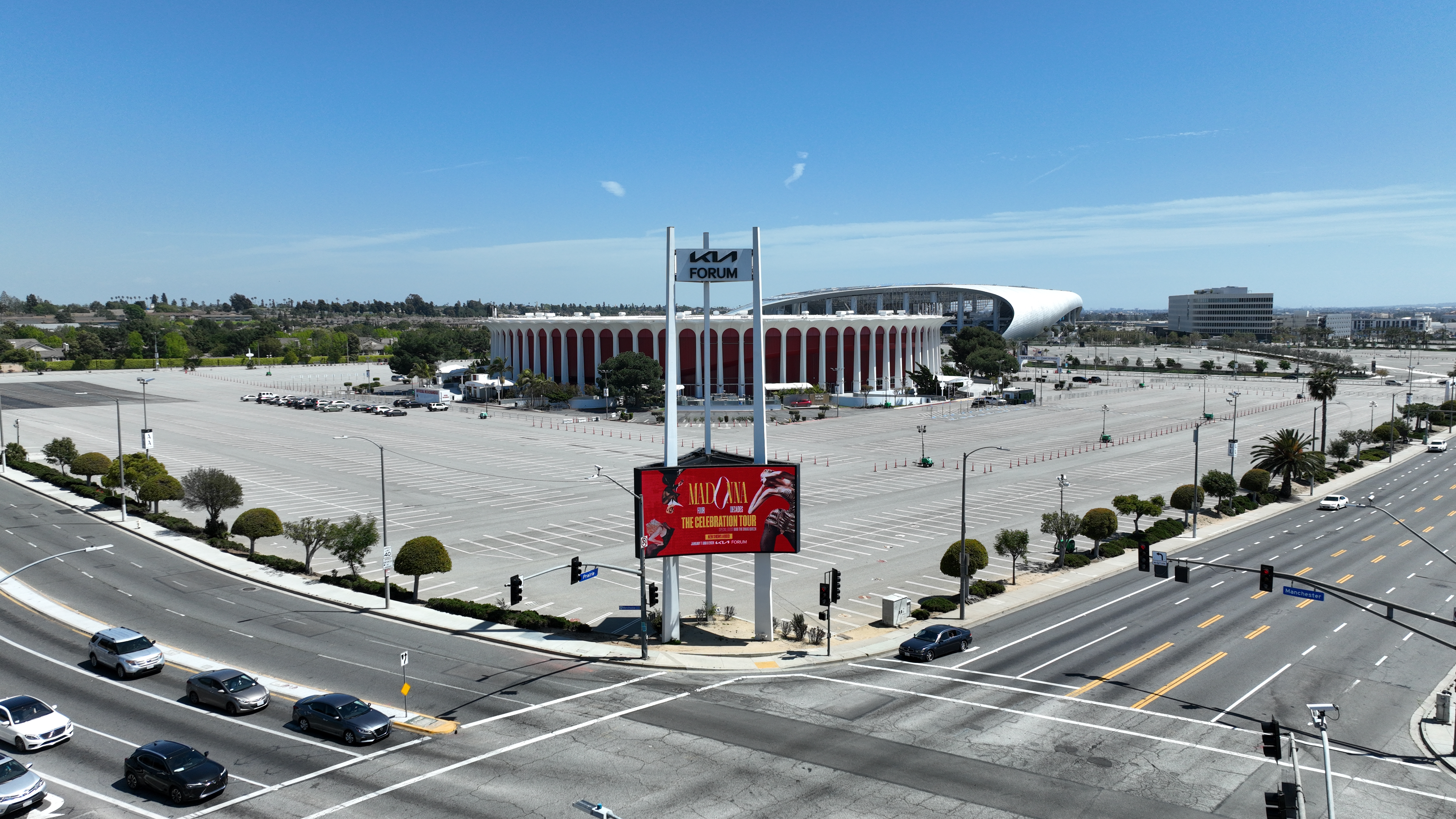
Kia Forum in April 2023

On April 4, 2022, Kia Motors, whose American headquarters are located in Irvine, acquired the naming rights to the facility, renaming it Kia Forum.

In October 2022, My Chemical Romance performed five sold-out shows at The Forum as part of their Reunion Tour.

Harry Styles performed a 15-night residency at The Forum in October and November 2022 as part of his Love On Tour.

K-pop singer SUGA (aka AgustD) of BTS took over The Forum for 3 sold-out nights, May 10–11 and 14, 2023, as part of his D-Day Tour.

The Forum hosted the concluding matches of the 2023 Valorant Champions, the world championship for the tactical FPS video game Valorant, from August 24 to 26, 2023.

Ghost (Swedish band) played at the venue twice on September 11th and 12th in 2023 during their Imperatour, both performances were recorded for the film Rite Here Rite Now.

On June 19, 2024, Kendrick Lamar hosted The Pop Out: Ken & Friends at The Forum for Juneteenth and as a victory lap from his feud with Drake.

K-pop singer-songwriter IU performed a sold-out show at The Forum on August 2, 2024, as part of her HEREH World Tour.

Olivia Rodrigo hosted four sold-out concerts as part of her Guts World Tour on August 13–14 and 16–17, 2024, with The Breeders serving as the opening act.

On September 11, 2024, Linkin Park performed a sold-out show at the venue. This marked the first show of the From Zero World Tour promoting their eighth studio album, From Zero.

Billie Eilish hosted a series of five concerts on December 15, 16, 17, 20, and 21, 2024, as part of her Hit Me Hard and Soft tour.

The Forum co-hosted FireAid on January 30, 2025, to help relief efforts for the wildfires affecting Southern California.

On June 7, 2025, the arena hosted Worlds Collide, a cross-promotional wrestling event between American promotion World Wrestling Entertainment (WWE) and Mexican promotion Lucha Libre Asistencia, Asesoría y Administración (AAA). It was held as a support event for Money in the Bank 2025 at Intuit Dome.

Rush's Fifty Something Tour began at the Forum on June 7, 2026, with additional shows lasting until June 13. Their last concert with drummer Neil Peart occurred at the Forum on July 1, 2015.

== In popular culture ==
In the video game Grand Theft Auto: San Andreas, the Los Santos Forum is based on the Kia Forum. In Grand Theft Auto V, the building was renamed to the Maze Bank Arena and more resembles the Los Angeles Memorial Coliseum.

Events and tenants
Preceded by Los Angeles Memorial Sports Arena	Home of the Los Angeles Lakers; 1967–1999	Succeeded by Staples Center
Preceded by Los Angeles Memorial Sports Arena	Home of the Los Angeles Kings; 1967–1999	Succeeded by Staples Center
Preceded by First arena	Home of the Los Angeles Sparks; 1997–2000	Succeeded by Staples Center
Preceded by Olimpiisky; Moscow	Olympic Basketball tournament Final Venue; 1984	Succeeded by Jamsil Arena; Seoul
Preceded by San Diego Sports Arena; Brendan Byrne Arena	Host of the NBA All-Star Game; 1972; 1983	Succeeded by Chicago Stadium; McNichols Sports Arena
Preceded by Joe Louis Arena	Host of the NHL All-Star Game; 1981	Succeeded by Capital Centre
