= Out on the Tiles =

Song by Led Zeppelin

from the album Led Zeppelin III
- Released: 5 October 1970
- Recorded: May—June 1970 (?) (Rolling Stone Mobile Studio); 3 June 1970 (Olympic Sound Studio)
- Studio: Rolling Stones Mobile Studio, Headley Grange (Hampshire); Olympic Sound Studios, Barnes, London
- Genre: Hard rock
- Length: 4:04
- Label: Atlantic
- Songwriters: Jimmy Page; Robert Plant; John Bonham
- Producer: Page

"Out on the Tiles" is a song by English rock band Led Zeppelin, released on their 1970 album Led Zeppelin III.

== Background ==
Originally titled "Bathroom Song" (Note: There are conflicting sources as to what the song was originally called. Writers Jean-Michel Guesdon and Philippe Margotin believed it was called "Bathroom Song", although the 2014 reissue of Led Zeppelin III calls it "Bathroom Sound".) because Bonham had the thought that he recorded the drums in a bathroom, "Out on the Tiles" started out as a drinking song Bonham would apparently hum or shout in the studio.

=== Production ===
Page used a production technique he loved to use in the recording studio where he would place one microphone near his guitar, and another at the other end of the studio on "Out on the Tiles", as Page would state during an interview with music author Steven Rosen; "the distance of the time lag from one end of the room to the other and putting that in as well. The whole idea, the way I see recording, is to try and capture the sound of the room live and the emotion of the whole moment and try to convey that. That’s the very essence of it. And so, consequently, you've got to capture as much of the room sound as possible."

At around 1 minutes 23 seconds into the song, a voice that many people believe to be likely Robert Plant, can be heard shouting "Stop!", setting some bearings to help structure the track, there are claims that the shouting was directed at an individual in the studio who was trying to distract whoever was shouting "Stop!". After the 3 minute mark, the drums begin to pan from left to right.

== Composition and lyrics ==
When interviewed by author Brad Tolinski, guitarist Jimmy Page revealed "Yes, John Bonham had quite a bit to do with 'Out on the Tiles'. I wrote the opening descending riff, but the guitar part behind the vocal was based on a song he used to sing that went something like: 'Out on the tiles, I’ve had a pint of bitter/and I’m feeling better 'cause I'm out on the tiles".

== Release ==
"Out on the Tiles" was released on Led Zeppelin III on 5 October 1970, and is sequenced as the final track on the first side of the record. It was sometimes used as an opener for "Black Dog" from their fourth album in concerts. It is included on various of the band's compilation albums and boxed sets, including Led Zeppelin Boxed Set 2, and The Complete Studio Recordings. In Japan, the song was originally the b-side for "Immigrant Song" by Japanese Atlantic. Once Warner and Pioneer Records took over, they reissued the single with the correct b-side. These original pressings have since become collector's items.

== Critical reception ==
Writing for Ultimate Classic Rock, Dave Swanson commented it was "One of Jimmy Page's best riffs ever powers this heavy monster", giving it number 25 in their ranking of the 50 best Led Zeppelin songs. In a ranking of the 50 best Led Zeppelin songs for Uproxx, it was placed number 45 by Steven Hyden.

== Cover versions ==
The American rock band Blind Melon contributed a cover of "Out on the Tiles" to the tribute album Encomium: A Tribute to Led Zeppelin. Megadeth released a cover of the song as a bonus track on the Japanese edition of their eleventh studio album United Abominations in 2007.

== Personnel ==
According to authors Jean-Michael Guesdon and Philippe Margotin:

- Robert Plant – vocals
- Jimmy Page – guitars
- John Paul Jones – bass
- John Bonham – drums
