= Since I've Been Loving You =

Song by Led Zeppelin

from the album Led Zeppelin III
- Released: 5 October 1970
- Recorded: May–June 1970 (?); 1969 December (?); 5 June 1970; July 1970 (?); August 1970
- Studio: Rolling Stones Mobile Studio, Headley Grange, Hampshire; Olympic Studios, London; Island Studios, London; Ardent Studios, Memphis, Tennessee
- Genre: Blues rock
- Length: 7:25
- Label: Atlantic
- Songwriters: John Paul Jones; Jimmy Page; Robert Plant
- Producer: Jimmy Page

Audio sample
- file; help

"Since I've Been Loving You" is a blues rock song by the English rock band Led Zeppelin, released in 1970 on the album Led Zeppelin III.

== Overview ==
"Since I've Been Loving You" is a slow blues rock song in the key of C minor. It was one of the first songs prepared for the Led Zeppelin III album. The song was recorded live in the studio with very little overdubbing. It was reportedly the hardest to record.

John Paul Jones played Hammond organ on the song, using the bass pedals instead of a bass guitar. John Bonham's preferred drum pedal, the Ludwig Speed King model 201, squeaks during the recording, and has been called the "Squeak King".

The opening and closing lyrics of "Since I've Been Loving You" are nearly identical to the 1968 Moby Grape song "Never".

== Personnel ==
- Robert Plant – vocals
- Jimmy Page – guitars
- John Paul Jones – bass pedals, organ
- John Bonham – drums

== Reception and accolades ==
In a contemporary review of Led Zeppelin III, Lester Bangs of Rolling Stone wrote that the track "represents the obligatory slow and lethally dull seven-minute blues jam." Robert Christgau was more enthusiastic in Newsday; "with John Paul Jones providing a great thick wall of organ behind Plant and Page", he regarded it as "the ultimate power blues".

Years later, guitarist Joe Satriani enthused: "'Since I've Been Loving You' was a perfect example of taking a blues structure but striking out on your own. They were breaking ground, not copying. I love that Page would always just go for it. Some other guitarist might have better technique, but what Page did would always trump it because the spirit was so overwhelming. Whatever he did would turn into a technique." Audio engineer Terry Manning called it "The best rock guitar solo of all time."

Publication	Country	Accolade	Year	Rank
Sounds	Germany	"The Top 30 Songs of All Time"	1992	16
Mojo	United Kingdom	"100 Great Voices"	1994	*
Guitarist	United Kingdom	"Top 100 Guitar Solos of All-time"	1998	8
Guitar World	United States	"100 Greatest Solos of All-time"	1998	53
Q	United Kingdom	"1010 Songs You Must Own!"	2004	*
(*) designates unordered lists.

== See also ==
- List of cover versions of Led Zeppelin songs
- List of Led Zeppelin songs written or inspired by others

== Bibliography ==
- Guesdon, Jean-Michel; Margotin, Philippe (2018). Led Zeppelin All the Songs: The Story Behind Every Track. Running Press. ISBN 978-0-316-448-67-3.
