= Knebworth Festival 1979 =

1979 concerts by Led Zeppelin

Knebworth 1979
- Concert by Led Zeppelin
- Location: Knebworth Park, England
- Associated album: In Through the Out Door
- Start date: 4 August 1979
- End date: 11 August 1979
- Legs: 1
- No. of shows: 2 (excluding two European warm-up shows)

Led Zeppelin concert chronology
- North America 1977; Knebworth 1979; Tour Over Europe 1980

The Knebworth Festival 1979 consisted of two concerts performed by the English rock band Led Zeppelin and other artists at Knebworth Park, Hertfordshire, England, in August 1979.

== History ==
The grounds of Knebworth House near the village of Knebworth had been a major venue for open air rock and pop concerts since 1974. In 1979, veteran promoter Freddy Bannister booked Led Zeppelin to play that year's concerts which took place on 4 August and 11 August after the bandleader of the Electric Light Orchestra, Jeff Lynne, turned down the offer to headline the festival.

Led Zeppelin had not performed live for two years, since the death of Robert Plant's son during the band's 1977 North American tour, and they had not performed in the United Kingdom for four years. Their manager Peter Grant decided that the band should perform at Knebworth instead of embarking on a lengthy tour, as explained by Dave Lewis:

The whole [Led Zeppelin touring] operation had become too big. Page's experience from the 1971 club tour ruled out any small dates. They had played the biggest indoor arena in the UK (Earls Court 1975) four years earlier. As Peter Grant saw it, they had to come back in the grandest style possible. Knebworth was the answer and after negotiations with promoter Freddie Bannister the 4 August date was scheduled with a second date on hold. The demand for tickets for the first date was enormous, leading to the second date being added.

The band's fee for performing was reportedly the largest ever paid to one single act at that time.

In the lead-up to the concerts Led Zeppelin undertook extensive rehearsals at Bray Film studios near London, and attended the venue at Knebworth in order to inspect the site, complete a publicity photograph shoot and perform a soundcheck. In addition, they performed two low-key warm-up shows in late July at the Falkoner Theatre, Copenhagen, Denmark.

Also performing at the Knebworth concerts in 1979 were The New Barbarians, featuring Ronnie Wood and Keith Richards (The New Barbarians played only at the second concert on August 11); Todd Rundgren and Utopia; Southside Johnny; Marshall Tucker; Commander Cody; Chas & Dave; and Fairport Convention.

According to the official website of Knebworth House, the 1979 Knebworth Festival involved:

the largest stage ever constructed, 570 loo seats, 750 feet of urinals and the biggest rock band in the world. Led Zeppelin played their last ever concerts (in the UK) at Knebworth, and it was the end of an era for the Knebworth shows. Both concerts overran, noise complaints were received from 7 miles away. The rubbish team struggled to cope with clearing the arena between the shows. The police believed that 200,000 people had turned up each night, Sainsbury's lost 150 trolleys and Tesco 75% of their stock, and Lord Cobbold [owner of Knebworth House] ended up in Court.

These were amongst the largest crowds to which Led Zeppelin had ever performed. Lewis writes:

For many in attendance it was their first ever concert experience. For many it would be the only time that they would get to see Zeppelin perform live. For that reason alone it holds a special affection in their live history. The first show in particular, with so much riding on it, was perhaps the most important they ever played.

Similarly, music journalist Chris Welch has observed that the audiences "included a whole new generation who had never seen Led Zeppelin in their prime."

== Critical reaction ==
The concerts received decidedly mixed reviews, but has received retrospective acclaim and has been regarded as one of Led Zeppelin's finest live performances. Although Record Mirror and Melody Maker provided generally positive reports, journalists from other major music publications such as New Musical Express, Sounds, Rolling Stone and The Sunday Times criticized Led Zeppelin's performances as being sluggish and rusty. With such a long layoff since their last performances in Britain, and in the wake of the punk rock revolution, Led Zeppelin were now considered to be obsolete in some quarters.

The negative reviews prompted the ire of Robert Plant, who made sarcastic reference to them on-stage during the 11 August show. However, Plant himself later expressed reservations about the concerts:

Knebworth was useless. It was no good at all. It was no good because we weren't ready to do it, the whole thing was a management decision. It felt like I was cheating myself because I wasn't as relaxed as I could have been. There was so much expectation there and the least we could have done was to have been confident enough to kill. We maimed the beast for life, but we didn't kill it. It was good, but only because everybody made it good. There was that sense of event.

In an interview he gave in 2005, Plant elaborated:

I was racked with nerves. It was our first British gig in four years and we could have gone back to the Queen's Head pub. We talked about doing something like that. But instead we went back in such a flurry and a fluster to 210,000 people in a field and 180,000 more the next day [sic], surrounded by Keith and Ronnie and Todd Rundgren. Nobody's big enough to meet those expectations. But because there was some chemical charge in the air, it worked. It didn't work for us. We played too fast and we played too slow and it was like trying to land a plane with one engine. But it was fantastic for those who were there.

Led Zeppelin's manager Peter Grant stated after the event that Led Zeppelin's performance at Knebworth was "a bit rusty". In the opinion of Lewis the gigs were a "nervous, rather tentative attempt [by Led Zeppelin] to step back into the limelight ... Some of it was breathtaking, some musically woefully inept and sometimes it wavered between the two in the space of a few minutes." Welch, who also attended the concerts, similarly suggests that:

Fans [at Knebworth] were still supporting the band, but there was definitely a feeling [Led Zeppelin's] days were numbered. Audience reaction at Knebworth had not been overwhelming and many seemed content to stand and stare, like mesmerised spectators at an alien ritual, a far cry from the hysteria of earlier shows. Robert Plant seemed perplexed at the silence between songs, when you could practically hear a pin drop in that vast, cold field. It wasn't until he led the way into "Stairway to Heaven" and "Trampled Underfoot" that roars of appreciation began to echo around Knebworth.

== Audio and video recordings ==
The two concerts were professionally recorded on the Rolling Stones Mobile Studio (engineered by George Chkiantz) and also videotaped, with live images beamed directly onto a giant screen behind the stage. The video was done by the TV International company under the direction of Chris Bodger. There was a plan for the footage to be used on a television special (this is one of the reasons the band members wore the same clothes on both nights) but this idea was never realised. Only short clips of some of the songs were used by Atlantic Records for promotional purposes.

For many years, bootleg copies of this audio and video material circulated amongst fans. The first audience-recorded bootlegs became available in early 1980. However, aside from the promotional snippets, Led Zeppelin never officially released any of the recordings until 2003, when parts of the footage were digitally remastered and included on the Led Zeppelin DVD. Two songs from the concerts, "Sick Again" and "Kashmir", appear on the 2025 Led Zeppelin Live E.P.

== Set list ==
Two songs from the band's eighth studio album, In Through the Out Door, were played for the first time on stage, namely "Hot Dog" and "In the Evening". The album was intended to be released prior to the band's concerts, but production delays pushed its release date to shortly after the event. Plant jokingly referred to the delays at times during the performance on 4 August.

All tracks written by Jimmy Page and Robert Plant, except where noted.

The band's set list was as follows:

1. "The Song Remains the Same"
2. "Celebration Day" (Jones, Page, Plant)
3. "Out on the Tiles" (intro) (Bonham, Page, Plant) / "Black Dog" (Jones, Page, Plant)
4. "Nobody's Fault but Mine"
5. "Over the Hills and Far Away"
6. "Misty Mountain Hop" (Jones, Page, Plant)
7. "Since I've Been Loving You" (Jones, Page, Plant) / "Tea for One" (solo)
8. "No Quarter" (Jones, Page, Plant)
9. "Ten Years Gone" (on 24 July and 4 August only)
10. "Hot Dog"
11. "The Rain Song"
12. "White Summer" / "Black Mountain Side" (Page)
13. "Kashmir" (Bonham, Page, Plant)
14. "Trampled Under Foot" (Jones, Page, Plant)
15. "Sick Again" (added on 24 July)
16. "Achilles Last Stand"
17. "JP solo" (Page)
18. "In the Evening" (Jones, Page, Plant)
19. "Stairway to Heaven"

Encore

1. "Rock and Roll" (Bonham, Jones, Page, Plant) (played on 23 July, 4 August, and 11 August)
2. "Whole Lotta Love" (Bonham, Dixon, Jones, Page, Plant) (played on 24 July, 4 August, and 11 August)
3. "Heartbreaker" (Bonham, Jones, Page, Plant) (on 4 August only)
4. "Communication Breakdown" (Bonham, Jones, Page) (on 11 August only)

== Dates ==
Date	City	Country	Venue
Leg 1 – Copenhagen warm-up shows
23 July 1979	Copenhagen	Denmark	Falkoner Theatre
24 July 1979	Copenhagen	Denmark	Falkoner Theatre
Leg 2 – Knebworth Festival
4 August 1979	Stevenage	England	Knebworth Festival
11 August 1979	Stevenage	England	Knebworth Festival

== Dispute with Freddy Bannister ==
Following the event, a dispute arose between Grant and Bannister about the attendance figures at the event. A query by Grant over ticket sales for the concerts resulted in him sending aerial pictures of the crowd to a monitoring laboratory in Nassau, New York, in order to establish the extent of the attendance. He claimed that some 218,000 people were at the first concert and 187,000 at the second. However, the license was for only 100,000 and Bannister claimed that only 104,000 had attended in the first week. For the second show, Grant brought in his own staff to man turnstiles and count tickets.

This disagreement eventually forced Bannister's concert promotion company into liquidation, which allegedly left unpaid bills of £50,000 for the police and £2,000 to the local borough council.

== Sources ==
- Lewis, Dave and Pallett, Simon (1997) Led Zeppelin: The Concert File, London: Omnibus Press. ISBN 0-7119-5307-4.
