= List of Led Zeppelin concert tours =

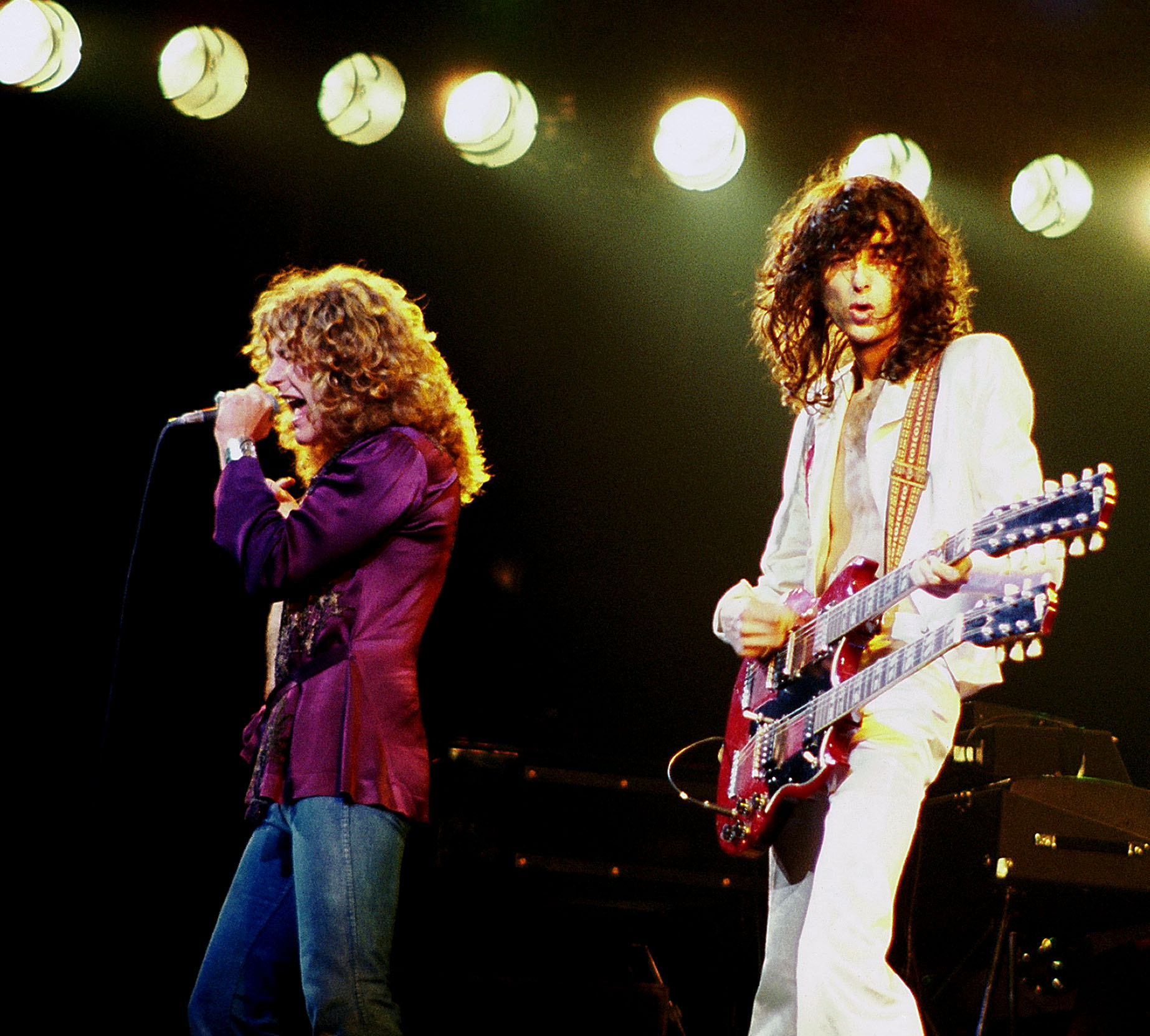
Robert Plant (left) and Jimmy Page (right) on stage in Chicago at Chicago Stadium, April 10, 1977.

From September 1968 until the summer of 1980, English rock band Led Zeppelin were one of the world's most popular live music acts, performing hundreds of sold-out concerts around the world.

== History ==
Throughout the late 1960s and 1970s, Led Zeppelin made numerous concert tours of the United States, the United Kingdom and Europe in particular. They performed over 600 concerts, initially playing small clubs and ballrooms and then, as their popularity increased, larger venues and arenas as well.

In the early years of their existence, Led Zeppelin made a concerted effort to establish themselves as a compelling live music act. As was recalled by bass player John Paul Jones:

[Led] Zeppelin was a live band and that's how we got our reputation. The press hated us in the early days. Our only way of promotion was to play a lot of live shows, especially in the UK. It used to spread by word-of-mouth.

However, though the band made several early tours of the UK, the majority of Led Zeppelin's live concerts were performed in the United States, which was settled on as the primary foundation for their fame and accomplishment. In 1969, for example, all but 33 of the band's 139 shows were performed in the U.S., and between the years 1968 and 1971 they made no fewer than nine tours of North America. "It felt like a vacuum and we'd arrived to fill it", guitarist Jimmy Page once told journalist Cameron Crowe. "It was like a tornado, and it went rolling across the country." After touring almost incessantly during its early years, Led Zeppelin later limited its tour appearances to alternating years: 1973, 1975, 1977 and 1979.

From the early 1970s, the commercial and popular drawing power of Led Zeppelin was such that the band began to embark on major stadium tours which attracted vast crowds, more than they had previously performed to. During their 1973 tour of the United States, they played to 56,800 fans at Tampa Stadium, Florida, breaking the record set by The Beatles at Shea Stadium in 1965. Similar crowds were drawn on Led Zeppelin's subsequent U.S. tours, and they continued to break attendance records (on April 30, 1977 they played to 76,229 fans at the Pontiac Silverdome, Michigan, a world record attendance for a solo indoor attraction). It is for these reasons that Led Zeppelin, as much as any other band or artist in this era, is credited for helping to establish what has come to be known as stadium rock. Many critics attribute the band's rapid rise as much to their tremendous appeal as a live act as they do to the quality of their studio albums.

Led Zeppelin also performed at several music festivals over the years, including the Atlanta International and the Texas International Pop Festivals in 1969, the Bath Festival of Blues in 1969 and the next one in 1970, the "Days on the Green" in Oakland, California in 1977, and the Knebworth Music Festival in 1979.

== Characteristics ==
Led Zeppelin's reputation as a compelling live act is often attributed to the tight understanding and musical chemistry achieved between all four group members, combined with a shared willingness to try new things on-stage, which resulted in dynamic, unpredictable performances. As is noted by Led Zeppelin archivists Dave Lewis and Simon Pallett:

Led Zeppelin live was an extraordinary animal. From the very beginning no two performances were alike. Such was the creative spark between the four that the basic structures of their songs were repeatedly reworked, extended and improvised on, making their studio counterparts almost unrecognisable.

Led Zeppelin have been described as the kind of group that actually rehearsed on stage, experimenting with the reaction of the audiences to new material and letting the pieces mature through the live experience. Several tracks from their albums were debuted on stage well before their official release on vinyl. Jimmy Page himself has said that most of the band's songs were designed for live performance.

Every show we did was different. You never knew when you went onstage what you might do by the end of it ... Once a song was recorded, and it went into the set, it began to mutate. The whole improvisational aspect, the riffs coming out of the ether ... it was a magical vehicle collectively soaring into the stratosphere. And as more albums came out, the set got longer and longer.

In an interview he gave to Uncut magazine in 2005, Page elaborated:

The beauty of playing in the band was that when we went onstage we never actually knew what was going to go on within the framework of the songs. They were constantly changing. New parts would come out on the night. The spontaneity was on the level of ESP, which meant it was always exciting.

As described by Cameron Crowe, "[Led] Zeppelin live was a direct descendant from Elvis' early shows. Raw, direct, a reminder of when rock was young."

With such shared enthusiasm for playing a diverse range of musical styles coupled with their emphasis on extended improvisation, Led Zeppelin's concerts frequently extended for several hours. Recalled Jones:

Things got extended a lot to keep ourselves from going mad. Every tour we tried to cut it down, especially in the later years. We'd say we're only going to play an-hour-and-a-half. After a week, it would creep back up to two hours. By the end of the tour it's three hours!

After their 1977 tour of the U.S. — their last major tour — the band chose to abandon much of the "mystical" image that surrounded them up to that point. Instead members would wear ordinary street clothes during their concerts and the setlist was toned down by excluding long, elaborate solo numbers like Bonham's "Moby Dick" and Page's trademark bowed guitar solo accompanied by a laser show.

== Recordings and live concert footage ==
Many of the band's shows have been preserved as Led Zeppelin bootleg recordings, which continue to be prized by collectors and fans. In addition, footage of Led Zeppelin concerts has been released officially on the band's 1973 concert film The Song Remains the Same, and on the Led Zeppelin DVD (2003). However, unlike other artists of the era such as The Who and The Rolling Stones, comparatively little official concert footage exists of Led Zeppelin. This is largely because of the successful efforts of manager Peter Grant to limit the exposure of the band to television appearances, in order to encourage fans who wanted to see the band to attend Led Zeppelin concerts. Of the few professionally shot concerts the band did, (excluding their July 1973 concert at Madison Square Garden on The Song Remains the Same) six are today available to fans through bootlegs. These concerts include the last two nights of their five-concert run at Earls Court Arena in London in May 1975, their show in Seattle's Kingdome in 1977 and their two shows at Knebworth in August 1979. In addition to these, their Royal Albert Hall performance from January 1970 is available.

== Concert tour chronology ==
- September 1968 – Scandinavian Tour 1968
- October–December 1968 – UK Tour 1968
- December 1968–February 1969 – North American Tour 1968–1969
- March–April 1969 – UK and Scandinavian Tour 1969
- April–May 1969 – North American Tour Spring 1969
- June 1969 – UK Tour Summer 1969
- July–August 1969 – North American Tour Summer 1969
- October 1969 – European Tour Autumn 1969
- October–December 1969 – North American Tour Autumn 1969
- January 1970 – UK Tour 1970
- February–March 1970 – European Tour 1970
- March–April 1970 – North American Tour Spring 1970
- June–July 1970 – Tour of Iceland, Bath & Germany 1970
- August–September 1970 – North American Tour Summer 1970
- March–April 1971 – United Kingdom Tour Spring 1971
- May–August 1971 – European Tour 1971
- August–September 1971 – North American Tour 1971
- September 1971 – Japanese Tour 1971
- November–December 1971 – United Kingdom Tour Winter 1971
- February 1972 – Australasian Tour 1972
- May–June 1972 – North American Tour 1972
- October 1972 – Japanese Tour 1972
- October 1972–January 1973 – UK Tour 1972/1973
- March–April 1973 – European Tour 1973
- May–July 1973 – North American Tour 1973
- January–March 1975 – North American Tour 1975
- May 1975 – Earls Court 1975
- April–July 1977 – North American Tour 1977
- August 1979 – Two warm-up concerts in Denmark and Knebworth Festival 1979
- June–July 1980 – Tour Over Europe 1980

== Reunion concerts ==
Since Led Zeppelin disbanded following the death of drummer John Bonham in 1980, the three surviving members of the band have reunited publicly on-stage on just a few occasions.

- On July 13, 1985, at the Live Aid concert at JFK Stadium, Philadelphia. Tony Thompson and Phil Collins both played drums on all three songs. For the last song, "Stairway to Heaven", Paul Martinez played bass, while John Paul Jones moved to keyboards. The band was introduced on stage by Phil Collins as "my three friends" (not as Led Zeppelin). Concert programmes did not mention the name Led Zeppelin.
- On May 14, 1988, at the Atlantic Records 40th Anniversary concert, with Bonham's son, Jason Bonham, on drums.
- On January 12, 1995, at Led Zeppelin's induction into the United States Rock and Roll Hall of Fame. Their performance included five songs and variously featured vocalist Steven Tyler and guitarists Joe Perry and Neil Young. Jason Bonham played drums on the first four songs, while Page and Plant drummer Michael Lee played them on the final song, "When The Levee Breaks".
- On December 10, 2007, at the Ahmet Ertegün Tribute Concert at The O_{2} in London, with Jason Bonham again filling in on drums.

== Sources ==
- Lewis, Dave and Pallett, Simon (1997) Led Zeppelin: The Concert File, London: Omnibus Press. ISBN 0-7119-5307-4.
