= Live E.P. (Led Zeppelin EP) =

2025 live EP by Led Zeppelin

EP by Led Zeppelin
- Released: 12 September 2025
- Genre: Hard rock; progressive rock
- Length: 34:51
- Label: Atlantic
- Producer: Jimmy Page

Led Zeppelin chronology
The Complete BBC Sessions (2016)	Live E.P. (2025)

Led Zeppelin live chronology
Celebration Day (2007)	Live E.P. (2025)

Singles from Live E.P.
- 1. "Trampled Under Foot (Live from Earl's Court, 1975)" Released: 24 July 2025; 2. "Kashmir (Live from Knebworth, 1979)" Released: 29 August 2025

Live E.P. is a live EP by the English rock band Led Zeppelin in commemoration of the 50th anniversary of their 1975 studio album, Physical Graffiti.

== Background ==
In July 2025, Led Zeppelin announced the EP's release along with the 50th anniversary edition of their 1975 double album, Physical Graffiti. The EP consists of songs off the album performed live during their 1975 Earls Court and 1979 Knebworth concerts. These performances had previously been released on their double DVD/VHS box set Led Zeppelin DVD. However, this is the first pressing on audio-only mediums for these tracks.

== Track listing ==
All tracks are written by Jimmy Page and Robert Plant, additional writers as noted.

No.	Title	Writer(s)	Length
1.	"In My Time of Dying" (Live from Earls Court, 1975)	John Bonham; Blind Willie Johnson; John Paul Jones	11:25
2.	"Trampled Under Foot" (Live from Earls Court, 1975)	Jones	9:06
3.	"Sick Again" (Live from Knebworth, 1979)		5:18
4.	"Kashmir" (Live from Knebworth, 1979)	Bonham	9:02
Total length:			34:51

== Charts ==
Chart performance for Live E.P.
Chart (2025)	Peak position
Australian Albums (ARIA)	46
Austrian Albums (Ö3 Austria)	9
Belgian Albums (Ultratop Flanders)	67
Belgian Albums (Ultratop Wallonia)	34
Croatian International Albums (HDU)	4
French Albums (SNEP)	90
French Rock & Metal Albums (SNEP)	5
German Albums (Offizielle Top 100)	17
German Rock & Metal Albums (Offizielle Top 100)	8
Greek Albums (IFPI)	75
Hungarian Albums (MAHASZ)	28
Italian Albums (FIMI)	80
Japanese Albums (Oricon)	23
Japanese Combined Albums (Oricon)	35
Japanese Rock Albums (Oricon)	4
Scottish Albums (OCC)	5
Swiss Albums (Schweizer Hitparade)	13
UK Albums (OCC)	16
US Billboard 200	150
US Top Rock & Alternative Albums (Billboard)	38

== Release history ==
Release history and formats for Live E.P.
Region	Date	Format	Label	Ref.
Various	12 September 2025	Streaming; vinyl; CD	Atlantic Records	
