= Candy Store Rock =

- German single picture sleeve

Single by Led Zeppelin

from the album Presence
- B-side: "Royal Orleans"
- Released: 18 June 1976 (US)
- Recorded: November 1975
- Studio: Musicland, Munich, Germany
- Genre: Rock and roll; rockabilly
- Length: 4:10
- Label: Swan Song
- Songwriters: Jimmy Page, Robert Plant
- Producer: Jimmy Page

Led Zeppelin singles chronology
"Trampled Under Foot" (1975)	"Candy Store Rock" (1976)	"Fool in the Rain" (1979)

"Candy Store Rock" is a song by English rock band Led Zeppelin, released in 1976 on their album Presence. It was also released as a single in the United States, but it did not chart.

== Recording ==
The band recorded the song at Musicland Studios in Germany. Plant sang from a wheelchair because he was recovering at the time from a car accident he had sustained in Greece. Plant considers "Candy Store Rock" to be one of his favourite songs from Presence. Jimmy Page's guitar solo is short and measured, coming in halfway through the song.

== Live renditions ==
"Candy Store Rock" was never performed live by the band at Led Zeppelin concerts, except for a brief riff by Page at Riverfront Coliseum in Cincinnati, Ohio, on 20 April 1977. However, a one-minute improvisation was played live in concert by Page and Plant as a "Black Dog" introduction on 26 July 1995 at Wembley Arena. The song was also played live in Montreux by Page and Plant on 7 July 2001.

== Reception ==
In a contemporary review for Presence, Stephen Davis of Rolling Stone described "Candy Store Rock" as "perfectly evoking the Los Angeles milieu in which the Zep composed [Presence]." He further described the song as sounding like "an unholy hybrid in which Buddy Holly is grafted onto the quivering stem of David Bowie." Record World said that Led Zeppelin "[deviates] from the rigid demands of top 40, but the sound is coordinated to stand up to repeated listenings"

In a retrospective review of Presence (Deluxe Edition), Andrew Doscas of PopMatters described "Candy Store Rock" as sounding like "the prequel to 1971's "Rock and Roll"" from their fourth album.

Singer Robert Plant later described "Candy Store Rock", along with "Achilles Last Stand", as the "saving grace[s] of Presence". Plant said the song's rhythm section was inspiring to him, partly due to the album's tumultuous recording sessions.

== Personnel ==
According to Jean-Michel Guesdon and Philippe Margotin:

- Robert Plant – vocals
- Jimmy Page – electric guitar, acoustic guitar
- John Paul Jones – bass
- John Bonham – drums

== Bibliography ==
- Guesdon, Jean-Michel; Margotin, Philippe (2018). Led Zeppelin All the Songs: The Story Behind Every Track. Running Press. ISBN 978-0-316-448-67-3.
