= Presence (album) =

Studio album by Led Zeppelin
- Released: 31 March 1976
- Recorded: 9–27 November 1975
- Studios: Musicland, Munich, West Germany
- Genres: Hard rock; blues rock
- Length: 44:47
- Label: Swan Song
- Producer: Jimmy Page

Led Zeppelin chronology
Physical Graffiti (1975)	Presence (1976)	The Song Remains the Same (1976)

Led Zeppelin studio chronology
Physical Graffiti (1975)	Presence (1976)	In Through the Out Door (1979)

Singles from Presence
- 1. "Candy Store Rock" / "Royal Orleans" Released: 18 June 1976 (US)

Presence is the seventh studio album by the English rock band Led Zeppelin. It was released by the band's own label Swan Song Records on 31 March 1976 in the United States and on 2 April 1976 in the United Kingdom. While the record was commercially successful, reaching the top of both the British and American album charts, and achieving a triple-platinum certification in the United States by the RIAA, it received mixed reviews from critics and is the lowest-selling album by the band. Presence has received more positive reviews in the years since its release.

The album was written and recorded in the last months of 1975, during a difficult time in the band's history. Singer Robert Plant was recovering from serious injuries he had sustained earlier that year in a car accident; this led to tours being cancelled and the band booking studio time to record Presence instead. The entire album was completed in a few weeks, with guitarist Jimmy Page putting in several long shifts to complete recording and mixing. The title came from the strong presence the group felt as they worked together. The LP's artwork from Hipgnosis featured several photographs focused on a mysterious black object, called "The Object".

Presence is dominated by compositions by Page and Plant, with only one track credited to the entire group; unlike other Zeppelin albums, it features no keyboards and little acoustic guitar. Because Plant was still ill, the band could not tour to promote the release, and only two tracks were ever performed live. However, the album has been re-appraised in retrospective reviews for its hard rock dynamics and simplicity compared to the group's other work.

== Background ==
After touring in support of their previous album, Physical Graffiti, released in early 1975, Led Zeppelin took a brief break from touring that summer, intending to start a major US tour on 23 August. Critics had said they were at the height of their popularity at this time. However, singer Robert Plant sustained serious injuries from a car accident on the Greek island of Rhodes on 4 August, which forced the band to cancel the tour and reschedule their activities.

Because of their status as tax exiles, Plant was forced to recuperate abroad, initially in Jersey in the Channel Islands, then in Malibu, California. He wrote several sets of lyrics that reflected on his personal situation and wondering about the future. Guitarist Jimmy Page joined him in Malibu in September and the pair began to think about plans to make an album instead. The two prepared enough material to be able to present to the rest of the band. The other two members, drummer John Bonham and bassist John Paul Jones, joined them at Hollywood's SIR Studio where they rehearsed the material throughout October 1975.

== Recording ==
Once they had worked out arrangements, the group were eager to record. Page favoured going to Musicland Studios in Munich, Germany, which he felt had state-of-the-art recording facilities. Plant was still recovering from the accident during recording and sang his vocals in a wheelchair, which led to Page assuming most of the responsibilities at the sessions. The album was recorded and mixed with longtime group associate and engineer Keith Harwood. It was completed in 18 days, with the final mixes finished on 27 November. This was the fastest recording turnaround time achieved by the band since their debut album.

The rushed recording sessions were in part a result of Led Zeppelin having booked the studio immediately prior to the Rolling Stones, who were shortly to record songs for their album Black and Blue (released, like Presence, in the spring of 1976). Page negotiated with the Stones to borrow two days from their recording session time, during which he completed all the guitar overdubs in one lengthy session. Page and Harwood then worked on the mixes virtually non-stop until they fell asleep; whoever woke up first went back to the desk to carry on. Page later stated he worked around 18–20 hours every day during the sessions.

The recording sessions for Presence were also particularly challenging for Plant. The studio was in the basement of the Arabella Hochhaus hotel, and the singer felt claustrophobic. He also experienced physical difficulties as a result of his car accident, and missed his family. He later said he was upset about Page and manager Peter Grant booking the Presence sessions and began to re-evaluate the priorities in his life.

Because the album was completed one day before the American holiday of Thanksgiving, Plant suggested to the record company the album should be called Thanksgiving. This idea was quickly dropped in favour of a title that was thought would represent the powerful force and presence that the band members felt surrounded the group.

== Songs ==
Six of the seven songs on the album are Page and Plant compositions; the remaining song, "Royal Orleans", is credited to all four band members. This is because the majority of the songs were formulated at Malibu, where Page (but not Bonham and Jones) had initially joined a recuperating Plant. With Plant at less than full fitness, Page took responsibility for the album's completion, and his playing dominates the album's tracks.

Both Page and Plant had planned this album's recording session as a return to hard rock, much like their debut album, except at a new level of complexity. It marked a change in the Led Zeppelin sound towards more straightforward, guitar-based jams. Whereas their previous albums up to and including the previous year's Physical Graffiti contain electric hard rock anthems balanced with acoustic ballads and intricate arrangements, Presence was seen to include more simplified riffs, and is Led Zeppelin's only studio album that features no keyboards, and with the exception of a rhythm track on "Candy Store Rock", no acoustic guitar. The changed stylistic emphasis on this album was a direct result of the troubled circumstances experienced by the band around the time of its recording. Page later said the music came from this spontaneity. Plant later described it as "a cry of survival" and speculated the group would not make another album like it.

The ten-minute opening song, "Achilles Last Stand", was first recorded on 12 November, when the basic backing track was laid down. Jones played an Alembic 8 string bass on the track, giving it a distinctive tone. Plant wrote the lyrics based on travelling across Africa in mid-1975 with Page. Page added six guitars in the marathon overdubbing session at the end of the recording period.

"For Your Life" was developed mostly in the studio. For the recording, Page used a Fender Stratocaster, provided by former Byrds guitarist Gene Parsons. "Royal Orleans" was written about an incident involving Jones at the Royal Orleans Hotel in New Orleans and includes a reference to soul singer Barry White. It was the only track on the album credited to the entire band.

"Nobody's Fault but Mine" was inspired by the Blind Willie Johnson song "It's Nobody's Fault but Mine", first recorded in 1928 and later covered by Nina Simone in 1969. The influence of the old blues song is noticeable in both Page's guitar work in the track, and also in the melody and lyrics.

"Candy Store Rock" was inspired by 1950s rock 'n' roll.

"Hots on for Nowhere" was written about Plant's time in Malibu, while Page played the Stratocaster on the track.

The closing number, "Tea For One", was a slow blues written by Plant about the problems he faced being separated from his family, and was an attempt to update their earlier "Since I've Been Loving You" from Led Zeppelin III.

In contrast to earlier albums that contained several tracks that the band chose to play live at Led Zeppelin concerts, only two tracks from Presence were played in full on stage while the band was active. "Achilles Last Stand" and "Nobody's Fault but Mine" were added to the setlist for the 1977 tour of the United States and stayed on it through the band's final concerts in 1980. (Note: The lack of live interpretations of the Presence material is perhaps understandable given that it would be a full year before they would return to the road.) "Tea For One" was performed live on the Page and Plant tour of Japan in 1996, where the main group was backed by an orchestra. "For Your Life" was played in full by Led Zeppelin for the first (and only) time at the Ahmet Ertegün Tribute Concert on 10 December 2007.

== Packaging and artwork ==
The cover and inside sleeve, created by Hipgnosis with George Hardie, features images of people interacting with a black obelisk-shaped object. Inside the sleeve, the item is referred to simply as "The Object". It was intended to represent Zeppelin's "force and presence". Hipgnosis co-founder Storm Thorgerson wrote that the obelisk represented the power of Led Zeppelin, saying they were "so powerful, they didn't need to be there". Both Page and Plant have said that the presence of the object in the photographs made people stop and think about what is real, which reflected the music.

The background in the cover photograph is an artificial marina, installed in London's Earl's Court arena for the annual Boat Show, in the winter of 1974–75. The band played a series of concerts at this venue in May 1975, a few months after the boat show. The inner sleeve photographs came from various archive stock pictures, and was designed to resemble a feature in National Geographic. The girl on the back cover photo was Samantha Gates, and she had also appeared (with her brother Stefan) on the cover of Houses of the Holy. Hipgnosis and Hardie were nominated for a Grammy Award for Best Album Package in 1977.

In an interview in July 2026, Steve Hackett of Genesis claimed that, while working on an album cover for A Trick of the Tail, Hipgnosis presented them with the cover that ended up being that of Presence, and that Genesis rejected it, preferring an illustration over a photograph.

== Release and reception ==
Retrospective professional reviews
Review scores
Source	Rating
AllMusic	3.5/5 stars
Christgau's Record Guide	B
The Daily Telegraph	2/5 stars
The Encyclopedia of Popular Music	3/5 stars
Entertainment Weekly	C+
MusicHound Rock	4/5
Pitchfork	7.6/10
Q	3/5 stars
The Rolling Stone Album Guide	3/5 stars

The album was released on 31 March 1976, having been delayed by the completion of the album sleeve. In Britain it attained one of the highest ever advance orders, shipping gold on the day of release. It entered at No. 2 and peaked the following week at No. 1 on the US Billboard Pop Albums chart. However, the album was the lowest selling of their career as it was overshadowed by the release of the band's movie and soundtrack The Song Remains the Same. "Candy Store Rock" was released as a single in the US, but it failed to chart.

In a contemporary review for Rolling Stone, Stephen Davis said Presence "established Led Zeppelin as the premier heavy metal act" and "featured some exceptional rock music", highlighting the "clean and purifying" guitar riffs. In spite of "a few dull blues rock songs", Davis found the album was "another monster in what by now is a continuing tradition of battles won by this band of survivors". Robert Christgau was less enthusiastic in The Village Voice, citing "Hots on for Nowhere" as a "commanding cut" while finding much of the rest "consistent but unnecessary" in comparison with earlier recordings.

Neil McCormick of The Daily Telegraph claimed it was "Zeppelin at their most blunted", awarding it two stars out of five. In a retrospective review, a Q critic who gave the album three out of five stars wrote, "Presence sounds as rushed as it was."

According to journalist Dave Lewis, "The direct, hard-hitting nature of the seven recordings failed to connect with a fan base more accustomed to the diversity and experimental edge of their previous work. Page later acknowledged that, because the album conveys a sense of urgency resulting from the troubled circumstances in which it was recorded, "it's not an easy album for a lot of people to access ... [I]t's not an easy album for a lot of people to listen to." Lewis nonetheless believed that Presence was underrated, as its music "packs a considerable punch", highlighting Page's playing and the production on the album. Fellow journalist Mick Wall said it "pulled Led Zeppelin back from the brink of crisis".

=== 2015 reissue ===
2015 deluxe edition reviews
Aggregate scores
Source	Rating
Metacritic	77/100
Review scores
Source	Rating
Mojo	4/5 stars
Pitchfork	7.6/10
PopMatters	7/10
Q	3/5 stars
Uncut	8/10

A remastered version of Presence, along with In Through the Out Door and Coda, were reissued on 31 July 2015. The reissue comes in six formats, including CD, vinyl and digital download. The deluxe and super deluxe editions feature bonus material containing alternative takes and one previously unreleased instrumental, "10 Ribs & All/Carrot Pod Pod". The reissue was released with an altered colour version of the original album's artwork as the bonus disc's cover.

The reissue received generally positive reviews. At Metacritic, which assigns a normalised rating out of 100 to reviews from mainstream publications, the album received an average score of 77, based on eight reviews. Pitchfork wrote, "It might be their weakest album, but Presence is among the most special; none of these songs sound like they could have come from another record." Uncut said the original album is grand "in lyric form and musical scale", while "the discs of 'companion audio,' often short on revelation, here reveal a moment of sheer anomaly. '10 Ribs & All/Carrot Pod Pod (Pod)' is whatever that title may mean, everything the LP is not: a tender piano piece." PopMatters was less impressed, saying "like the rest of the re-releases, the bonus material leaves too much to be desired", but concluded, "despite its weak second half, Presence is too good of an album to be dismissed."

== Track listing ==
=== Original release ===
Details are taken from the original UK and US Swan Song albums; all tracks are written by Jimmy Page and Robert Plant, except where noted.

Side one
No.	Title	Writer(s)	Length
1.	"Achilles Last Stand"		10:26
2.	"For Your Life"		6:21
3.	"Royal Orleans"	Page, Plant, John Paul Jones, John Bonham	2:58

Side two
No.	Title	Length
1.	"Nobody's Fault but Mine"	6:27
2.	"Candy Store Rock"	4:10
3.	"Hots on for Nowhere"	4:42
4.	"Tea for One"	9:27
Total length:		44:19

=== Deluxe edition bonus disc (2015) ===
Includes five tracks identified as "Reference mixes of works in progress".

Deluxe edition bonus disc (2015)
No.	Title	Writer(s)	Length
1.	"Two Ones Are Won" (Achilles Last Stand)		10:28
2.	"For Your Life"		6:28
3.	"10 Ribs & All/Carrot Pod Pod (Pod)"	Jones and Page	6:49
4.	"Royal Orleans"	Bonham, Jones, Page, and Plant	3:00
5.	"Hots on for Nowhere"		4:44
Total length:			31:32

== Personnel ==
Led Zeppelin

- John Bonham – drums
- John Paul Jones – bass
- Jimmy Page – guitars, production
- Robert Plant – vocals, harmonica

Production

- Peter Grant – executive producer
- Keith Harwood – engineering, mixing
- Reinhold Mack – assistant engineer (uncredited)
- Jeremy Gee – tape engineering
- George Hardie – sleeve design
- Hipgnosis – sleeve design
- George Marino – remastered CD release

== Charts ==
=== Weekly charts ===
Weekly chart performance for Presence
Chart (1976)	Peak position
Australian Albums (Kent Music Report)	4
Canada Top Albums/CDs (RPM)	16
Danish Albums (Hitlisten)	13
Dutch Albums (Album Top 100)	5
Finnish Albums (The Official Finnish Charts)	6
German Albums (Offizielle Top 100)	6
Italian Albums (Musica e Dischi)	15
Japanese Albums (Oricon)	2
New Zealand Albums (RMNZ)	8
Norwegian Albums (VG-lista)	4
Spanish Albums Chart	7
Swedish Albums (Sverigetopplistan)	5
UK Albums (Official Charts)	1
US Billboard 200	1

Weekly chart performance for Presence reissue
Chart (2015)	Peak position
Australian Albums (ARIA)	21
Austrian Albums (Ö3 Austria)	16
Belgian Albums (Ultratop Flanders)	24
Belgian Albums (Ultratop Wallonia)	8
Finnish Albums (Suomen virallinen lista)	12
French Albums (SNEP)	39
Hungarian Albums (MAHASZ)	9
Italian Albums (FIMI)	24
Portuguese Albums (AFP)	16
Scottish Albums (Official Charts)	7
Spanish Albums (Promusicae)	40
Swiss Albums (Schweizer Hitparade)	9
UK Rock & Metal Albums (Official Charts)	1

=== Year-end charts ===
1976 year-end chart performance for Presence
Chart (1976)	Position
UK Albums (OCC)	33
US Billboard 200	47

== Certifications ==
Certifications for Presence
Region	Certification	Certified units/sales
Canada (Music Canada)	Platinum	100,000^{^}
New Zealand (RMNZ)	Platinum	15,000^{^}
United Kingdom (BPI)	Platinum	300,000^{^}
United States (RIAA)	3× Platinum	3,000,000^{^}
^{^} Shipments figures based on certification alone.
