= Achilles Last Stand =

1976 song by Led Zeppelin

Song by Led Zeppelin

from the album Presence
- Released: 31 March 1976
- Recorded: November 1975
- Studio: Musicland, Munich, Germany
- Genre: Heavy metal; hard rock
- Length: 10:26
- Label: Swan Song
- Songwriters: Jimmy Page; Robert Plant
- Producer: Jimmy Page

"Achilles Last Stand" (Note: In Keith Shadwick's biography Led Zeppelin: The Story of a Band and Their Music 1968–1980 (2005), he uses the possessive case in the song title ("Achilles' Last Stand"), but does not explain why Page and Plant chose to exclude the apostrophe. Other biographers use the actual title.) is a song by the English rock group Led Zeppelin released as the opening track on their seventh studio album, Presence (1976). Guitarist Jimmy Page and singer Robert Plant began writing the song during the summer of 1975. They were influenced by Eastern music, mythology, and exposure to diverse cultures during their travels. At roughly ten-and-a-half minutes, it is one of the group's longest studio recordings (Note: For comparison, the Swan Song album LP record labels list "In My Time of Dying" at 11:08, "Carouselambra" at 10:28, "Achilles Last Stand" at 10:26, and "Tea for One" at 9:27.) and one of their most complex, with interwoven sections and multiple, overdubbed guitar parts.

The song received mainly positive reviews from music critics, with some comparing "Achilles Last Stand" to other Zeppelin songs such as "Kashmir". The band featured it during concerts from 1977 to 1980, and a 1979 live performance is included on the Led Zeppelin DVD (2003). Page called it his favourite Led Zeppelin song in several interviews, and considers its guitar solo on a par with his "Stairway to Heaven" solo.

== Background and lyrics ==
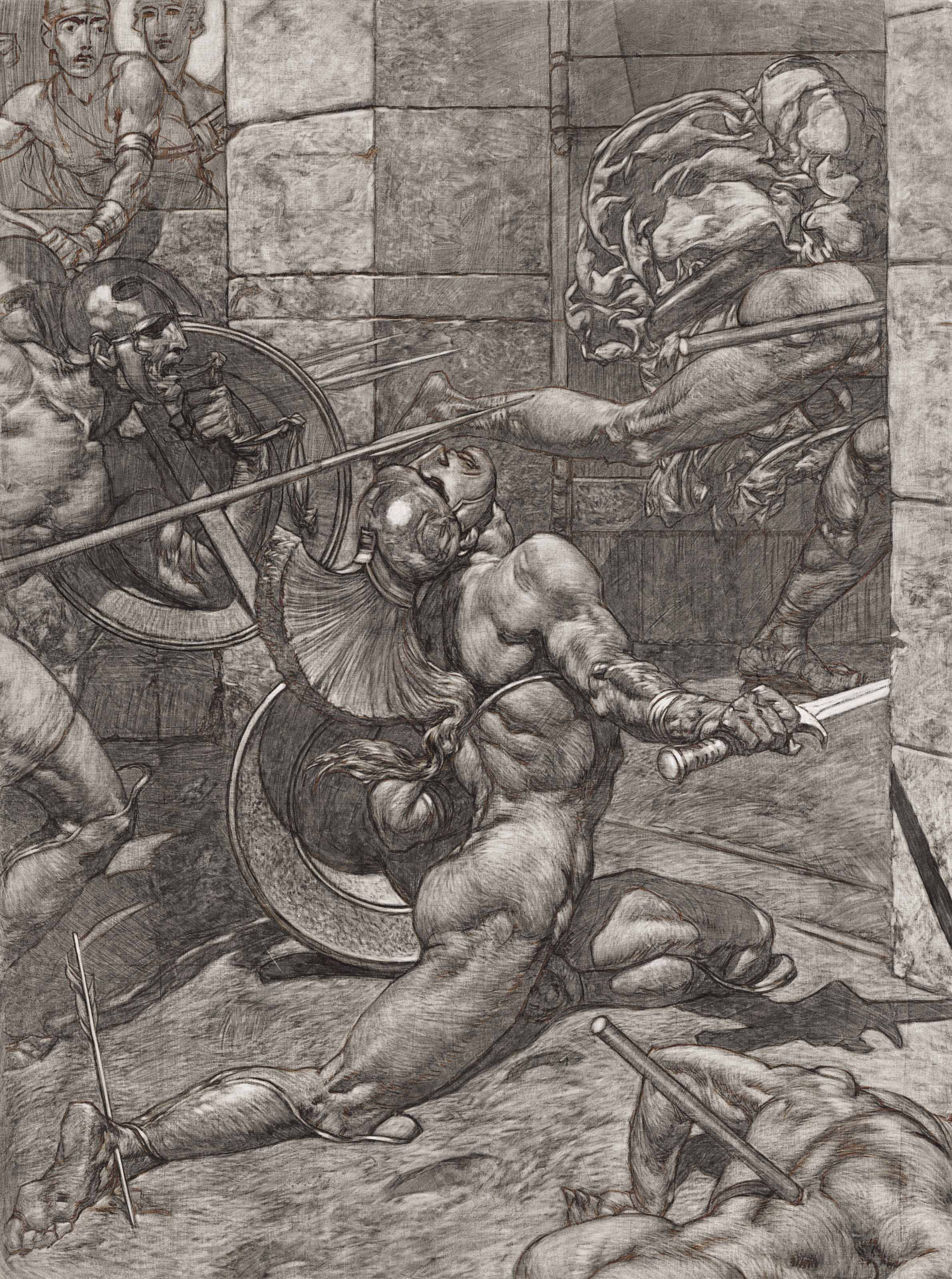
The Death of Achilles, brown ink and oil by Alexander Rothaug (1870–1946)

After their 1975 US tour and London concerts, Led Zeppelin took a break from performing. In order to remain tax exiles, the group members needed to limit their time in the UK. This is alluded to in the song's opening lines: "It was an April morning when they told us we should go, and as I turned to you, you smiled at me, how could we say no". Jimmy Page and Robert Plant went to Morocco in June 1975, where they developed material for their next album. Page heard local music, which influenced his guitar parts on "Achilles Last Stand". North African and Middle Eastern music had inspired earlier Led Zeppelin songs, such as "Friends", "Four Sticks", "No Quarter", and "Kashmir".

Although "Achilles Last Stand" uses mythological imagery drawn from William Blake's Albion, the Atlas myth and the Greek hero Achilles, its lyrics centre on the group's travels during their exile. The title is an ironic reference to Plant's August 1975 automobile accident, in which he severely injured his ankle, as Achilles was brought down by an arrow to his calcaneal tendon. Plant was unable to walk for a year, and recorded much of Presence in a wheelchair; the working title of "Achilles Last Stand" was "The Wheelchair Song". Group biographer Martin Popoff described Plant's lyrics:

Albion is a Blake reference, but it's also an ancient name for what would become England. The Atlas Mountains, which span Morocco, Algeria, and Tunisia, are also referenced, but through a nice twist, the lyric referring directly to Atlas instead, the god who held the earth on his shoulders. Within he [Plant] also relates his travels in Greece, Spain, Montreux, Jersey, and California, as well as what one internalizes from travel.

== Composition and recording ==
"Achilles Last Stand"
30-second excerpt with vocal and guitar verses

"Achilles Last Stand" opens with Page's Moroccan-influenced solo guitar arpeggios, which Led Zeppelin biographers have described as haunting and mysterious. Drummer John Bonham and bassist John Paul Jones then establish a driving hard rock rhythm that persists throughout the song. After the long introductory riff is played four times, Plant begins singing. His vocal sections are broken up by brief instrumental passages, and Page adds the first of several overdubbed guitar parts.

At 3:42, the song shifts, and Page plays his first solo. In addition to a change in tempo, the section includes breaks and a switch to 5/4 time, with the rest notated in 4/4 time in the key of E minor with a moderately-fast tempo of 146 beats per minute. When the vocals return, Page adds more guitars. After a brief slide-guitar part, Plant begins an Eastern-influenced scat-style vocal. At 8:25, Page plays a second solo with more overdubbed parts; a minute and a half later, the song winds down with chords echoing the opening.

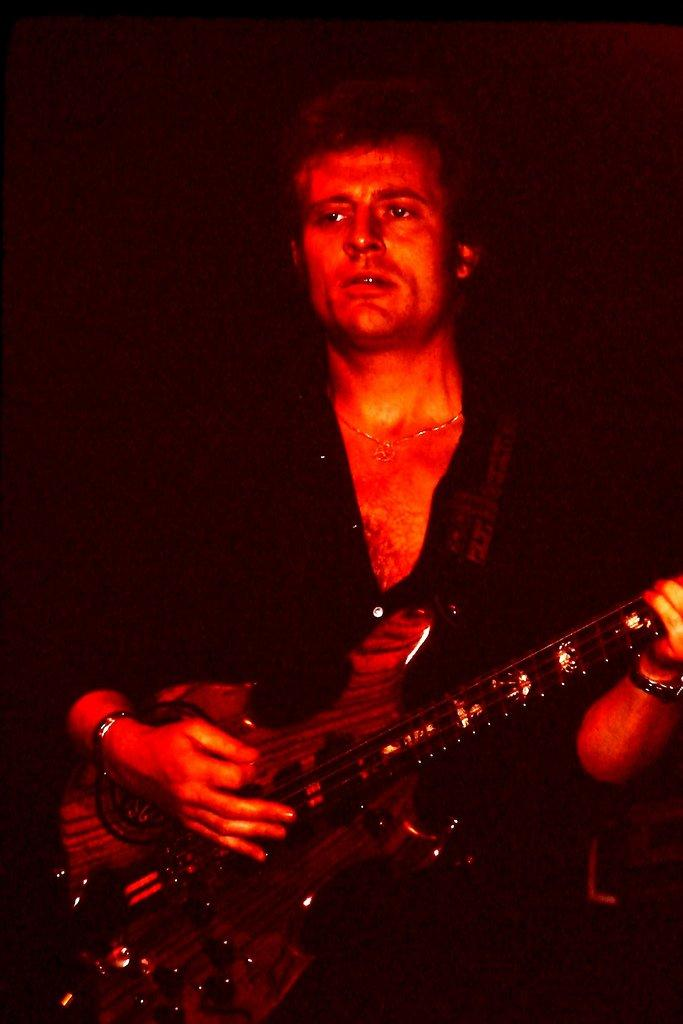
John Paul Jones (shown at a 1980 German concert) recorded with an eight-string bass for the first time on "Achilles Last Stand".

After extensive rehearsals in Los Angeles, Led Zeppelin went to Munich to record Presence at Musicland Studios. They recorded the basic tracks for "Achilles Last Stand" during early sessions on 12 November 1975. For the first time during a recording, Jones plays an eight-string bass guitar with a pick. He said that it added more mid-range presence during Page's high-register guitar solos; although Page objected at first, he soon recognized the effectiveness of Jones' innovation. Jones also uses a heavy metal gallop, a rhythmic figure in which an eighth note is followed by two sixteenth notes. (Note: When Jones was asked to describe Led Zeppelin's music on The David Letterman Show in 2012, he jokingly played the gallop on air bass. However, only one other of their songs, "Immigrant Song" (1970), has been identified as having a "prototype of the heavy metal gallop") To balance the sound, a second bass line was recorded; Popoff describes it as "a more traditional bass track, more elliptical and rife with pregnant pauses, simultaneously lying across the gallop and wholly independent of it."

Without the rest of the group, Page recorded all the guitar overdubs in one evening: "There must be half a dozen going at once. I knew that every guitar overdub had to be very important, very strong within itself to identify each section." The recording for Presence was completed on 27 November 1975, 15 days after the group laid down the basic tracks for "Achilles Last Stand". Page produced the album, with Keith Harwood providing the audio engineering.

== Release and performance ==
Swan Song Records released Led Zeppelin's seventh studio album Presence on 31 March 1976, with "Achilles Last Stand" its opening track. Although the album initially sold well, it was ultimately not a great success for the group. There was no tour to support the album. However, in November 1976, after Plant had sufficiently recovered, Led Zeppelin began rehearsing for an American tour. "Achilles Last Stand" was one of the first songs they attempted. Since their studio recording relied heavily on overdubs, they needed an arrangement which would work for a three-piece-plus vocal ensemble. Page recalled:

We could have just eased into familiar stuff but we went straight in to the deep end by trying out "Achilles". I thought I'd have to use the twin-neck [6- and 12-string Gibson EDS-1275 guitar] but it actually sounded better with the six string using different effects. When we did that first rehearsal it just all clicked all over again.

The song and "Nobody's Fault but Mine" were the only tracks from Presence that the group added to their repertoire. Led Zeppelin performed it at most of their concerts – often late in the set, before "Stairway to Heaven". A live performance of the song at the Knebworth Festival 1979 was filmed, and was later released on the Led Zeppelin DVD in 2003.

When Presence was remastered for the 2015 deluxe-album editions, a reference mix of "Achilles Last Stand" entitled "Two Ones Are Won" was included.

== Reception ==
The song received mostly positive reviews from music critics. In a 1976 review of Presence, Rolling Stone journalist Stephen Davis wrote: "'Achilles Last Stand' could be the Yardbirds, 12 years down the road. The format is familiar: John Bonham's furiously attacking drum is really the lead instrument, until Jimmy Page tires of chording under Plant and takes over." In a more negative view, Jon Young of Spin lambasted the song in his 1991 Led Zeppelin Boxed Set review: "Nothing could be less satisfying than ten minutes of 'Achilles Last Stand,' a simultaneously abrasive and boring ordeal." Music journalist Andrew Earles described it in a retrospective review of Presence as "a galloping, dour yet exhilarating onslaught of genuine heavy metal ... 'Achilles Last Stand' can be seen as a precursor to the new wave of British heavy metal that would soon explode all over Europe".

In a 2011 review of Presence published by Classic Rock Review, "Achilles Last Stand" was called the album's "tour de force" and "a true journey", though the reviewer felt that the song was somewhat long and repetitive. In a retrospective review of Presence (Deluxe Edition), Andrew Doscas of PopMatters described "Achilles Last Stand" as the band's "last true epic". AllMusic's Brian Downing called it the album's "most ambitious song ... the only one that resembles the layered masterpieces from Physical Graffiti."

== Personnel ==
According to Jean-Michel Guesdon and Philippe Margotin:

- Robert Plant – vocals
- Jimmy Page – electric guitars
- John Paul Jones – bass
- John Bonham – drums

== See also ==
- List of cover versions of Led Zeppelin songs § Achilles Last Stand

== Notes ==
Footnotes

Citations

References

- Akkerman, Gregg (2014). Experiencing Led Zeppelin: A Listener's Companion. Rowman & Littlefield. ISBN 978-0-81088-916-3.
- Alfred Music (2008). "Achilles Last Stand". Led Zeppelin Mothership Authentic Guitar Tab Edition. Alfred Publishing. ISBN 978-0-7390-5317-1.
- Atlantic (1993). The Complete Studio Recordings (Boxed set booklet). Led Zeppelin. Atlantic Records. Presence disc details. OCLC 29660775. 82526-2.
- Campbell, Iain (2016). "From Achilles to Alexander: The Classical World and the World of Metal". In Bayer, Gerd (ed.). Heavy Metal Music in Britain. Routledge. ISBN 978-0-7546-6423-9.
- Earles, Andrew (2015) [First published 2008]. "The LPs: Presence". In Bream, Jon (ed.). Whole Lotta Led Zeppelin: The Illustrated History of the Heaviest Band of All Time (2nd ed.). Voyageur Press. ISBN 978-0-7603-4932-8.
- Fast, Susan (2001). In the Houses of the Holy: Led Zeppelin and the Power of Rock Music. Oxford University Press. ISBN 0-19-511756-5.

== Bibliography ==
- Guesdon, Jean-Michel; Margotin, Philippe (2018). Led Zeppelin All the Songs: The Story Behind Every Track. Running Press. ISBN 978-0-316-448-67-3.
- Lewis, Dave (2010). Led Zeppelin: The 'Tight But Loose' Files. Omnibus Press. ISBN 978-0-857-12220-9.
- Lewis, Dave (2012). Led Zeppelin: A Celebration. Omnibus Press. ISBN 978-0-85712-819-5.
- Lewis, Dave; Pallett, Simon (2005). Led Zeppelin: The Concert File. Omnibus Press. ISBN 1-84449-659-7.
- Milward, John (2013). Crossroads: How the Blues Shaped Rock 'n' Roll (and Rock Saved the Blues). UPNE. ISBN 978-1-5555-3744-9.
- Popoff, Martin (2017). Led Zeppelin: All the Albums, All the Songs. MBI. ISBN 978-0-76035-211-3.
- Power, Martin (2016). No Quarter: The Three Lives of Jimmy Page. London: Omnibus Press. ISBN 978-1-78323-536-0.
- Schuman, Michael A. (2009). Led Zeppelin: Legendary Rock Band. Enslow Publishers. ISBN 978-0-7660-3026-8.
- Shadwick, Keith (2005). Led Zeppelin: The Story of a Band and Their Music 1968–1980 (1st ed.). Backbeat Books. ISBN 0-87930-871-0.
- Stang, Aaron; Purse, Bill (2014). Sound Innovations for Guitar, Teacher Edition Book 2: A Revolutionary Guitar Method for Individual or Class Instruction. Alfred Music. ISBN 978-1-47063-317-2.
- Swan Song (1976). Presence (Album notes). Led Zeppelin. Swan Song Records. OCLC 5690359. SS 8416.
- Tolinski, Brad (2012). Light and Shade: Conversations with Jimmy Page. Crown Publishing Group. ISBN 978-0-307-98573-6.
- Waksman, Steven Michael (1998). Instruments of Desire: The Electric Guitar and the Shaping of Musical Experience. University of Minnesota.
- Young, Jon (January 1991). "Blue Light Special: Led Zeppelin". Spin. Vol. 6, no. 10. ISSN 0886-3032.
