= Led Zeppelin North American Tour 1975 =

1975 concert tour by Led Zeppelin

North America 1975
- Tour by Led Zeppelin
- Poster for Led Zeppelin's concert at Baton Rouge, used to help promote its 1975 North American tour
- Location: United States; Canada
- Associated album: Physical Graffiti
- Start date: 18 January 1975
- End date: 27 March 1975
- Legs: 3
- No. of shows: 37 (and two European warm-up shows) (38 scheduled)

Led Zeppelin concert chronology
- North America 1973; North America 1975; Earls Court 1975

Led Zeppelin's 1975 North American Tour was the tenth concert tour of North America by the English rock band. The tour was divided into two legs, with performances commencing on 18 January and concluding on 27 March 1975. It was preceded with two European warm-up shows, performed at Rotterdam and Brussels respectively.

== History ==
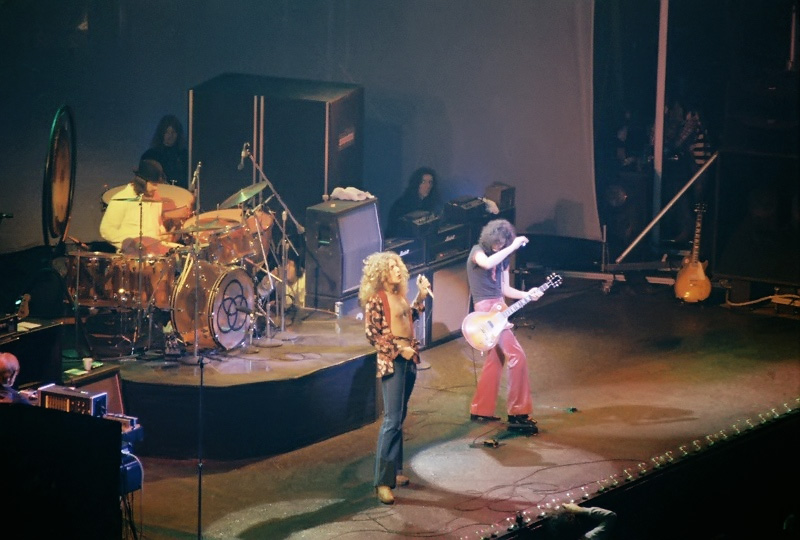
Led Zeppelin live at Chicago Stadium, January 1975.

The 1975 North American tour took place nearly 18 months after the conclusion of their previous concert tour, which was the longest break between concerts yet taken by the band. As a result, some critics have suggested that the band seemed sluggish and rusty upon their return to the stage, with the group lacking dynamics and giving rather 'heavy' performances.

To make matters worse, prior to leaving England for the tour guitarist Jimmy Page suffered a broken ring finger after slamming his fingertip in a train door. This forced him to take pain killers and to develop a three finger playing technique during the first portion of the tour. In addition, Robert Plant contracted a bad case of influenza early in the tour, causing the cancellation of one show and negatively affecting his singing ability for much of the rest of the tour, leading to some unfavourable reviews. However, toward the end of the tour it was noted that the group seemed to be recovering, leading to some memorable performances. Indeed, by the end of this series of dates, Plant himself stated that:

This has been our most successful tour on every level and I had a great time all the way through.

For this stint of concerts, Led Zeppelin employed a much grander light show than had been used on previous tours, featuring a large neon-lit 'Led Zeppelin' backdrop and krypton laser effects for Jimmy Page's violin bow interlude.

One scheduled concert in this tour, on February 4 at the Boston Garden, was canceled by the Mayor of Boston, Kevin White, when fans, who waited in the freezing cold for the tickets, were taken pity on by the stadium owners and were let in inside but rioted and trashed the stadium. A concert at 8 March at the West Palm Beach Speedway in Florida was also canceled following the promoters' failure to make property improvements at the venue.

The concert tour was promoted by the Concerts West firm, and it marked one of the first tours ever where an individual concert promotion firm promoted the whole U.S. tour of an artist or group. The company further established its mark by promoting the band's subsequent 1977 tour of North America.

An image of Katharine Hepburn in Christopher Strong wearing her aviator's suit appeared on the tour poster.

During this tour Led Zeppelin hired The Starship – a former United Airlines Boeing 720 passenger jet, to transport them between cities. This was the second and final time the band used this plane, having initially done so on their previous tour of North America in 1973.

Towards the end of this tour, Lynette Alice "Squeaky" Fromme, a member of Charles Manson's "Family", confronted Danny Goldberg, vice-president of the band's record company demanding to speak with Jimmy Page to warn him of "bad energy." Fromme claimed to have foreseen the future and wished to forewarn Page of the imminent danger. She swore the last time this happened, she had seen someone shot to death before her eyes. Goldberg stated that even he couldn't see Page until the following night, to which Fromme responded "tomorrow night will probably be too late." Goldberg persuaded her to write a long note to Page, after which she left. The note was burned, unread. Later that year, Fromme made an unsuccessful attempt to assassinate U.S. President Gerald Ford.

== Cancelled legs ==
The second leg of the band's US tour concluded in March, and was followed by a series of shows at London's Earl's Court in May 1975. The band had planned to continue touring after a break, with a further round of eight US shows scheduled from August 23 to September 9; this leg would have commenced with two sold out dates at Oakland Coliseum and included a show at the Rose Bowl in Pasadena, California in addition to concerts in Tempe, Arizona (Sun Devil Stadium), Kansas City, Missouri (Arrowhead Stadium), Atlanta (Atlanta–Fulton County Stadium), New Orleans (Louisiana Superdome) and Norman, Oklahoma (Lloyd Noble Center). A European tour was also planned for fall, including one scheduled concert in Helsinki. These plans were cancelled when Robert Plant sustained serious injuries from a car accident on the Greek island of Rhodes on August 5. During Plant's convalescence, in the time originally allotted for the tour the band opted to take time off before writing for the Presence album.

== Recordings ==
Audio recordings from many of the tour's shows have been preserved on unofficial bootleg recordings. Several high-quality soundboard bootleg recordings of shows from this tour have surfaced in recent years, including the 12 February Madison Square Garden, 13 and 14 February Nassau County Coliseum, and 16 February St. Louis Arena dates. The recording of the Dallas show from March 5th rivals the quality of officially released recordings, and shows that by the later stages of the tour, the band was playing as skillfully as on previous tours. Proof of this was the complete soundboard release of the 21 March Seattle show. Possibly the longest show of the tour in excellent quality. In 2021, an almost complete soundboard tape of the tour opening concert at the Metropolitan Sports Center in Bloomington, Minnesota surfaced. The band can be heard playing new material from the upcoming album to an American audience for the first time, a week after two warm-up dates in Rotterdam and Brussels.

== Setlist ==
The new set list included material from the band's recently released album, Physical Graffiti. Songs from that album which were played for the first time on this tour included "Sick Again", "In My Time of Dying", "Kashmir", "The Wanton Song" and "Trampled Under Foot". This was in spite of the fact that the album itself was not released until the second half of the tour. Unforeseen delays in the production of the album's elaborate sleeve prevented its release before the commencement of the tour.

Initially, both "When the Levee Breaks" and "The Wanton Song" were included in the set; the only period during which these songs were played live by Led Zeppelin. Both were dropped after a few weeks. It was also the last time "How Many More Times" was played, being temporarily brought back to replace "Dazed and Confused" which Page was unable to play until his injured finger healed. "Since I've Been Loving You", the other song that Page was unable to play due to his finger injury, was played only three times on the tour: 14 February at Nassau Coliseum, 21 March at Seattle Center Coliseum and 27 March at the Los Angeles Forum.

The fairly typical set list for the tour was:

1. "Rock and Roll" (Page, Plant, Jones, Bonham)
2. "Sick Again" (Page, Plant)
3. "Over the Hills and Far Away" (Page, Plant)
4. "When the Levee Breaks" (Minnie, Bonham, Page, Plant, Jones) (Dropped after 21 January)
5. "In My Time of Dying" (Page, Plant, Jones, Bonham)
6. "Since I've Been Loving You" (Page, Plant, Jones) (only on 14 February, 21 March, and 27 March)
7. "The Song Remains the Same" (Page, Plant)
8. "The Rain Song" (Page, Plant)
9. "Kashmir" (Bonham, Page, Plant)
10. "The Wanton Song" (Page, Plant) (Dropped after 25 January)
11. "No Quarter" (Page, Plant, Jones)
12. "Trampled Under Foot" (Page, Plant, Jones)
13. "Moby Dick" (Bonham)
14. "How Many More Times" (Page, Jones, Bonham) (21 January to 2 February) / "Dazed and Confused" (Page) (3 February to 27 March)*
15. "Stairway to Heaven" (Page, Plant)

Encores (variations of the following list):

- "Whole Lotta Love" (Bonham, Dixon, Jones, Page, Plant) (including "The Crunge")
- "Black Dog" (Page, Plant, Jones) (including "Out on the Tiles")
- "Heartbreaker" (Bonham, Page, Plant) (Played on 6 through 16 February and 4, 12, 14, 20, 21, and 24 March)
- "Communication Breakdown" (Bonham, Jones, Page) (played on 20, 22, 24, and 29 January, 1, 3, and 13 February, and 21 March)

* Performances of this song during the first leg of the tour included "San Francisco", while the band switched to "Woodstock" during the second leg. Also when performed, "Mars, Bringer of War", was included

Notes

In Uniondale from 13–14 February, Ronnie Wood joined the band during the encore of "Communication Breakdown"

== Tour dates ==
Date	City	Country	Venue
European warm-up shows
11 January 1975	Rotterdam	Netherlands	Ahoy Hallen
12 January 1975	Brussels	Belgium	Forest National
Leg 1 – North America
18 January 1975	Bloomington	United States	Metropolitan Sports Center
20 January 1975	Chicago	United States	Chicago Stadium
21 January 1975	Chicago	United States	Chicago Stadium
22 January 1975	Chicago	United States	Chicago Stadium
24 January 1975	Richfield	United States	Richfield Coliseum
25 January 1975	Indianapolis	United States	Market Square Arena
29 January 1975	Greensboro	United States	Greensboro Coliseum
31 January 1975	Detroit	United States	Olympia Stadium
1 February 1975	Pittsburgh	United States	Civic Arena
3 February 1975	New York City	United States	Madison Square Garden
4 February 1975	Uniondale	United States	Nassau Coliseum; Replaced cancelled concert at the Boston Garden which was originally scheduled for this date
6 February 1975	Montreal	Canada	The Forum
7 February 1975	New York City	United States	Madison Square Garden
8 February 1975	Philadelphia	United States	The Spectrum
10 February 1975	Landover	United States	Capital Centre
12 February 1975	New York City	United States	Madison Square Garden
13 February 1975	Uniondale	United States	Nassau Coliseum
14 February 1975	Uniondale	United States	Nassau Coliseum
16 February 1975	St. Louis	United States	St. Louis Arena
Leg 2 – North America
27 February 1975	Houston	United States	Sam Houston Coliseum
28 February 1975	Baton Rouge	United States	LSU Assembly Center
3 March 1975	Fort Worth	United States	Tarrant County Convention Center
4 March 1975	Dallas	United States	Dallas Memorial Auditorium
5 March 1975	Dallas	United States	Dallas Memorial Auditorium
~~8 March 1975~~	~~West Palm Beach~~	United States	~~Palm Beach International Raceway~~
10 March 1975	San Diego	United States	San Diego Sports Arena
11 March 1975	Long Beach	United States	Civic Arena
12 March 1975	Long Beach	United States	Civic Arena
14 March 1975	San Diego	United States	San Diego Sports Arena
17 March 1975	Seattle	United States	Seattle Center Coliseum
19 March 1975	Vancouver	Canada	Pacific Coliseum
20 March 1975	Vancouver	Canada	Pacific Coliseum
21 March 1975	Seattle	United States	Seattle Center Coliseum
24 March 1975	Inglewood	United States	The Forum
25 March 1975	Inglewood	United States	The Forum
27 March 1975	Inglewood	United States	The Forum

== Sources ==
- Lewis, Dave and Pallett, Simon (1997) Led Zeppelin: The Concert File, London: Omnibus Press. ISBN 0-7119-5307-4.
