= Ian Knight =

Ian Knight may refer to:

- Ian Knight (stage designer)
- Ian Knight (footballer)
- Ian Knight (historian)
