= Led Zeppelin North American Tour 1973 =

1973 concert tour by Led Zeppelin

North America 1973
- Tour by Led Zeppelin
- Location: United States; Canada
- Associated album: Houses of the Holy
- Start date: 4 May 1973
- End date: 29 July 1973
- Legs: 2
- No. of shows: 34

Led Zeppelin concert chronology
- Europe 1973; North America 1973; North America 1975

Led Zeppelin's 1973 North American Tour was the ninth concert tour of North America by the English rock band. The tour was divided into two legs, with performances commencing on 4 May and concluding on 29 July 1973. Rehearsals took place at Old Street Film Studios in London.

== History ==
The tour took place shortly after the release of Led Zeppelin's chart-topping fifth album, Houses of the Holy. Prior to its commencement, Led Zeppelin's manager Peter Grant hired PR consultant Danny Goldberg for promotion and booked large stadium venues. The resulting tour broke box office records across North America. On May 5 at Tampa Stadium, Florida, they played to 56,800 fans (breaking the record set by The Beatles at Shea Stadium in 1965), and grossed $309,000 (US$2,188,711 in 2024 dollars). In total, this tour grossed over $4,000,000 (US$28,332,834 in 2024 dollars).

Led Zeppelin's shows evolved from those on previous tours, with the introduction of dry ice, laser effects, backdrop mirrors, hanging mirror balls and Catherine wheel pyrotechnics. Their dress attire also took on a more flamboyant nature, evidenced in particular by guitarist Jimmy Page's hummingbird jacket and John Paul Jones' Spanish matador jacket. This increase in on-stage theatricality was later referred to by Page during an interview he gave with rock journalist Mick Wall:

Originally, we saw the whole essence of our live performance as something that the audience listened to very carefully, picking up on what was going on, the spontaneity and musicianship. And you can’t do that if you’re running around the stage all night, or at least we couldn’t back then." By 1973, however, "we were much more ambitious, in that respect. We really wanted to take the live performances as far as they could go.

Promotional poster of Led Zeppelin, 1973

Three sold-out shows at Madison Square Garden in New York City that concluded the tour were filmed for a motion picture, but the theatrical release of this project (The Song Remains the Same) was delayed until 1976. The film documents the theft of $203,000 of the group's money from a safe deposit box at the Drake Hotel in New York, just before their final show. The theft was discovered by Led Zeppelin tour manager Richard Cole, who was immediately interrogated by police as a suspect. The sum of money was the band's takings from their three New York concerts. It was never recovered and the identity of the thief or thieves has never been discovered. The band later sued the Drake Hotel for the theft.

Led Zeppelin hired for the first time The Starship – a former United Airlines Boeing 720B passenger jet. During the early part of the tour the band had hired a small private Falcon Jet to journey from city to city, but these aircraft are comparatively light and susceptible to air turbulence. After performing at Kezar Stadium in San Francisco on June 2, they encountered bad turbulence on a flight back to Los Angeles. As a result, Grant resolved to hire The Starship for the remainder of the tour, at a cost for $30,000. The exterior of the plane was re-sprayed with Led Zeppelin emblazoned down the side of the fuselage.

Flying on The Starship, Led Zeppelin was now no longer required to change hotels so often. They could base themselves in large cities and travel to and from concerts within flying distance. After each show, the band members would be transported directly by limousine from the concert venue to the airport, as depicted in the concert film, The Song Remains the Same.

In an interview with William Burroughs in 1975, Page commented on the exhausting nature of the 1973 tour:

[W]e were playing [sets] for three hours solid, and physically that was a real... I mean, when I came back from the last tour I didn't know where I was. I didn't even know where I was going. We ended up in New York and the only thing that I could relate to was the instrument onstage. It was like swinging on liana from one city to the other… I was just totally and completely spaced out.

In a more recent interview, Page recalled:

We arrived in America and we did 53,000 at Atlanta and then 55,000 at the following concert in Tampa, Florida — it was quite clear that if people were going to come along to see us in those kind of numbers we weren’t going to have problems doing concerts that would fulfil the demand. It was phenomenal though — the audience reaction was just so with us, y’know.

Vocalist Robert Plant said:

I remember that tour rather like the lyrics to "The Battle of Evermore". A flash. Really fast. Lots of battles and conquests. And the din of the hordes. So much happened in such a short time. It was phenomenal.

The kind of speed we were moving at, the creative juices in the air, the whole thing was just an absolute mixture of adrenaline, chemical, euphoria ... and there were no brakes. We couldn't stop what was happening. We had no idea what it even was. But we just kept trying, pushing forward, every show.

"I got to see Led Zeppelin at very close quarters on that tour, travelling as part of their entourage," recalled Roy Harper. "The level of their success then was unbelievable… Being so close to them at the time, it was difficult to be objective about it all – you know, I was going along on the bus. But Zeppelin in full flight was an incredibly intense experience."

== Tour set list ==
The song "No Quarter" from the band's recent album release, Houses of the Holy, was played for the first time on this tour. The band also dropped their acoustic set, which was not revived until the Earl's Court shows in May 1975.

The fairly typical set list for the tour was:

1. "Rock and Roll" (Page, Plant, Jones, Bonham)
2. "Celebration Day" (Jones, Page, Plant)
3. "Bring It On Home" (intro) (Dixon, Page, Plant) / "Black Dog" (Page, Plant, Jones)
4. "Over the Hills and Far Away" (Page, Plant)
5. "Misty Mountain Hop" (Page, Plant, Jones)
6. "Since I've Been Loving You" (Page, Plant, Jones)
7. "No Quarter" (Page, Plant, Jones)
8. "The Song Remains the Same" (Page, Plant)
9. "The Rain Song" (Page, Plant)
10. "Dazed and Confused" (Page)
11. "Stairway to Heaven" (Page, Plant)
12. "Moby Dick" (Page, Jones, Bonham)
13. "Heartbreaker" (Bonham, Page, Plant)
14. "Whole Lotta Love" (Bonham, Dixon, Jones, Page, Plant)

Encores (variations of the following list):

- "The Ocean" (Bonham, Jones, Page, Plant)
- "Communication Breakdown" (Bonham, Jones, Page)
- "Thank You" (Page, Plant) (Played on 3 June and 29 July)
- "Dancing Days" (Page, Plant) (Played on 13 July)

There were some set list substitutions, variations, and order switches during the tour.

== Tour dates ==
Date	City	Country	Venue
Leg 1 – Southeast/Southwest United States
4 May 1973	Atlanta	United States	Atlanta–Fulton County Stadium
5 May 1973	Tampa	United States	Tampa Stadium
7 May 1973	Jacksonville	United States	Jacksonville Coliseum
10 May 1973	Tuscaloosa	United States	Memorial Coliseum
11 May 1973	St. Louis	United States	St. Louis Arena
13 May 1973	Mobile	United States	Municipal Auditorium
14 May 1973	New Orleans	United States	New Orleans Municipal Auditorium
16 May 1973	Houston	United States	Sam Houston Coliseum
18 May 1973	Dallas	United States	Dallas Memorial Auditorium
19 May 1973	Fort Worth	United States	Tarrant Country Convention Center
22 May 1973	San Antonio	United States	Convention Center Arena
23 May 1973	Albuquerque	United States	University Arena
25 May 1973	Denver	United States	Denver Coliseum
26 May 1973	Salt Lake City	United States	Salt Palace
28 May 1973	San Diego	United States	San Diego Sports Arena
31 May 1973	Inglewood	United States	The Forum
2 June 1973	San Francisco	United States	Kezar Stadium
3 June 1973	Inglewood (Los Angeles)	United States	The Forum
Leg 2 – Midwest/Northeast/Northwest United States & Canada
6 July 1973	Chicago	United States	Chicago Stadium
7 July 1973	Chicago	United States	Chicago Stadium
9 July 1973	Saint Paul	United States	St. Paul Civic Center
10 July 1973	Milwaukee	United States	Milwaukee Arena
12 July 1973	Detroit	United States	Cobo Hall
13 July 1973	Detroit	United States	Cobo Hall
15 July 1973	Buffalo	United States	Buffalo Memorial Auditorium
17 July 1973	Seattle	United States	Seattle Center Coliseum
18 July 1973	Vancouver	Canada	Pacific Coliseum
20 July 1973	Boston	United States	Boston Garden
21 July 1973	Providence	United States	Providence Civic Center
23 July 1973	Baltimore	United States	Baltimore Civic Center
24 July 1973	Pittsburgh	United States	Three Rivers Stadium
27 July 1973	New York City	United States	Madison Square Garden; Concert footage and audio for The Song Remains the Same film and soundtrack album
28 July 1973	New York City	United States	Madison Square Garden; Concert footage and audio for The Song Remains the Same film and soundtrack album
29 July 1973	New York City	United States	Madison Square Garden; Concert footage and audio for The Song Remains the Same film and soundtrack album
