= Led Zeppelin DVD =

Led Zeppelin DVD (or VHS)

Video by Led Zeppelin
- Released: 26 May 2003
- Recorded: 1969–1979
- Genres: Hard rock; heavy metal; blues rock; folk rock
- Length: 320:00
- Label: Atlantic
- Director: Dick Carruthers
- Producers: Jimmy Page; Dick Carruthers
- Compiler: Jimmy Page

Led Zeppelin chronology
| The Best of Led Zeppelin (1999–2000) | Led Zeppelin DVD (or VHS) (2003) | How the West Was Won (2003) |

Led Zeppelin video chronology
| The Song Remains the Same (1976) | Led Zeppelin DVD (or VHS) (2003) |

Led Zeppelin DVD/VHS is a double DVD (or VHS) set by the English rock band Led Zeppelin, released in the United Kingdom on 26 May 2003, and the United States on 27 May 2003. It contains live concert footage of the band spanning the years 1969 to 1979. The release includes the performance filmed by Stanley Dorfman and Peter Whitehead at the Royal Albert Hall on 9 January 1970, and performances at Madison Square Garden in 1973, Earls Court in 1975, and Knebworth in 1979, plus other footage. Bootleg footage from some of the concerts is interspersed with the professionally shot material.

The front cover features West and East Mitten Buttes, photographed from the visitor centre at the Navajo Tribal Park located at Monument Valley, Arizona.

== Background and production ==
Led Zeppelin guitarist and producer of the project, Jimmy Page, commenced work on the project in the early 2000s. While fans had been trading poor quality versions of Led Zeppelin video material for years, this was the first official archival video release to contain any footage of the band playing live (outside of the cinematic, and later DVD release of The Song Remains the Same film). In an interview he gave after the release of the DVD, Page explained the impetus behind the project:

The reason for [the DVD] was that there was no visual material [of the band] that was out there really. The studio albums had been put out in many different shapes and forms, but this was something that was sorely missing because [Led] Zeppelin built its material on live performances. So that had to be done.

The idea for a live chronology had, however, dated back some time before this, according to singer Robert Plant in 2003:

The idea of creating a Led Zeppelin collage has been in the works for ... fifteen years. We just didn't really have the time to put it together as a project because there was so much concentrated work that was required. So, as we all finished our individual projects, Jimmy Page took the helm along with some technical guys and this is what we've got.

In 1970, Led Zeppelin commissioned the British director and Producer of BBC's music television series In Concert, Stanley Dorfman, to film the band's Led Zeppelin Live at the Royal Albert Hall performance on January 9. Dorfman and the two cameramen he hired, Peter Whitehead and an assistant, used handheld Bolex cameras to capture the concert in 16mm film. In late January, the Record Mirror reported that the "Led Zeppelin TV spectacular" had been sold to American TV and a special album would be issued to coincide with the screening of the show in the States.

Much later, the band's manager at the time, Peter Grant, claimed that a 40-minute cut was prepared but was not officially released at the time because the footage was filmed at the wrong speed. However, at an expert panel held at The Royal Albert Hall on 27 May 2017 featuring the Hall's historian Richard Dacre and Professor Steve Chibnall, of De Montfort University's Cinema and Television History Research Centre, Chibnall explained, "in the concert Led Zeppelin supplied a pulse feed off their mixing desk for the editing purposes but were not sufficiently happy with their performance to release the full soundtrack for use in the film." Chibnall stated that it was agreed with Stanley Dorfman that the concert would form part of a larger documentary project including the band's performance at the Bath Festival in June, but that the project was shelved as Peter Whitehead, who had planned to film the band arriving to the Bath festival by helicopter, arrived at the venue too late to capture it on film, and only shot 20 or 30 minutes of footage from the festival. Additionally, Whitehead was supposed to do interviews with the band members, which reportedly never happened, and so the entire project was shelved. According to Professor Chibnall, the footage ended up as a bootleg video in Japan in the 1980s after Whitehead loaned it to Peter Clifton who had directed the Zeppelin documentary The Song Remains The Same a few years prior in 1976.

Clifton went on to say that in 1995, Whitehead attempted to get a film released of the Royal Albert Hall and Bath footage and sold it to Mark Hayward of UFO Films, who entered into negotiations with Led Zeppelin. In 2003, virtually all the Royal Albert Hall concert footage was released as Disk One of the Led Zeppelin DVD. After the DVD release, Jimmy Page explained, "We had recorded and documented via 16mm a performance back in 1970 [at] the Royal Albert Hall. And there was quite a number of disputes over copyright of this material, and in the end it was sold to somebody who acquired it from one of the cameramen. And it was going to be auctioned at Sotheby's and, in actual fact, at the end of the day, we managed to do a deal with the chap [in 1997] to get it back, even though one of the reels managed to go missing! But ... you'll understand why it was so important to have this, because there was such precious little Zeppelin [filmed] material."

For the DVD, Page collaborated with music producer Kevin Shirley, with whom Page worked when he was performing with The Black Crowes. Shirley recalled:

I produced the Black Crowes, and Jimmy joined them for a run of live dates in 1999. I saw the show in New York, and then I went to California and recorded the shows, took the tapes away, and fixed them up a little and mixed them. I did Live at the Greek without any input from anyone, as it wasn't originally going to be an official release. But I think everyone was impressed with it; certainly Jimmy said he was. Then, when Jimmy decided to do a new [Led Zeppelin] DVD, he started looking for someone familiar with the modern applications necessary for surround sound mixing. If you listen to the Royal Albert Hall [concert] opening in 5.1, you can see Jimmy had this audio concept really early on of giving people a sense of the band going onstage and the audience swells around you. We had a meeting to discuss the requirements needed for the DVD project audio, and afterward, he asked if I would be interested in 'helping' him.

Page, with Shirley and the producer and creative director Dick Carruthers, worked for the best part of a year to research, compile, load, mix and present the material. Much of the footage which was included on the DVD was painstakingly restored for several months, before being mixed at Sarm West Studios in London. In all, 132 cans of film and two sets of two-inch video tape were examined for the project. In order to view material on the two-inch Quadruplex videotapes, a suitable playback machine had to be located. A working Quadruplex machine was finally found in Singapore.

Some of the video tapes suffered from a common fault called sticky-shed syndrome where the bonding agent holding the magnetic particles to the tape backing decomposes to the point where the oxide is scraped off during playback. The tapes consequently had to be restored by baking them in ovens at 55 °C (131 °F) for three weeks in order for them to be played back. The audio portions were digitally remixed for stereo and 5.1 surround mixes.

== Critical reception ==
Professional ratings
Review scores
| Source | Rating |
|---|---|
| AllMusic | 4.5/5 stars |
| Uncut | 5/5 stars |
| Rolling Stone | 4/4 stars |

Upon its release the DVD received critical acclaim. Michael Azerrad of Rolling Stone magazine gave the DVD a perfect four stars, describing it as the "Holy Grail of heavy metal" and "one of the best rock documentaries ever made".

== Commercial performance ==
The RIAA certified Led Zeppelin DVD at 13 times multi-platinum (1,300,000 copies sold in the United States). According to the BBC, the DVD broke all sales records for a music video, nearly three times as many in the first week of sales as the previous record holder. It was, for three years, the highest selling music DVD in the United States.

== Track listing ==
Disc one Royal Albert Hall, 9 January 1970
| No. | Title | Length |
|---|---|---|
| 1. | "Opening" | 0:27 |
| 2. | "We're Gonna Groove" (James Bethea, Ben E. King) | 3:13 |
| 3. | "I Can't Quit You Baby" (Willie Dixon) | 6:56 |
| 4. | "Dazed and Confused" (Jimmy Page; inspired by Jake Holmes) | 15:33 |
| 5. | "White Summer" (Page) | 12:23 |
| 6. | "What Is and What Should Never Be" (Page and Robert Plant) | 4:39 |
| 7. | "How Many More Times" (John Bonham, John Paul Jones, Page) | 20:17 |
| 8. | "Moby Dick" (Bonham, Jones, Page) | 15:21 |
| 9. | "Whole Lotta Love" (Bonham, Dixon, Jones, Page, Plant) | 6:24 |
| 10. | "Communication Breakdown" (Bonham, Jones, Page) | 4:16 |
| 11. | "C'mon Everybody" (Jerry Capehart, Eddie Cochran) | 2:31 |
| 12. | "Somethin' Else" (Bobby Cochran, Sharon Sheeley) | 2:10 |
| 13. | "Bring It On Home/Bring It On Back" (Bonham, Dixon, Jones, Page, Plant) | 7:44 |
| 14. | "Credits" | 0:21 |

Atlantic Records, February 1969
| No. | Title | Length |
|---|---|---|
| 1. | "Communication Breakdown (music video)" | 2:24 |

Danmarks Radio (Gladsaxe Teen Club, Gladsaxe), 17 March 1969
| No. | Title | Length |
|---|---|---|
| 1. | "Opening" | 0:10 |
| 2. | "Communication Breakdown" | 2:46 |
| 3. | "Dazed and Confused" | 9:09 |
| 4. | "Babe I'm Gonna Leave You" (Anne Bredon, Page, and Plant) | 6:46 |
| 5. | "How Many More Times" | 12:20 |

Supershow (Staines Studio, London), 25 March 1969
| No. | Title | Length |
|---|---|---|
| 1. | "Dazed and Confused" | 7:33 |

Tous en Scène (Antenne Culturelle du Kremlin-Bicetre, Paris), 19 June 1969
| No. | Title | Length |
|---|---|---|
| 1. | "Opening" | 0:25 |
| 2. | "Communication Breakdown" | 2:51 |
| 3. | "Dazed and Confused (edited)" | 5:36 |

Disc two Sydney Showground, 27 February 1972 (Splodge edit)
| No. | Title | Length |
|---|---|---|
| 1. | "Immigrant Song" (Page and Plant) | 4:03 |

Madison Square Garden, 27–29 July 1973
| No. | Title | Length |
|---|---|---|
| 1. | "Black Dog" (Jones, Page, Plant) | 5:30 |
| 2. | "Misty Mountain Hop" (Jones, Page, Plant) | 4:50 |
| 3. | "Since I've Been Loving You" (Jones, Page, Plant) | 8:03 |
| 4. | "The Ocean" (Bonham, Jones, Page, Plant) | 4:16 |

Earls Court, 24–25 May 1975 (see Earls Court 1975)
| No. | Title | Length |
|---|---|---|
| 1. | "Going to California" (Page, Plant) | 4:41 |
| 2. | "That's the Way" (Page, Plant) | 6:04 |
| 3. | "Bron-Y-Aur Stomp" (Jones, Page, Plant) | 5:31 |
| 4. | "In My Time of Dying" (Bonham, Jones, Page, Plant) | 11:14 |
| 5. | "Trampled Under Foot" (Jones, Page, Plant) | 8:14 |
| 6. | "Stairway to Heaven" (Page, Plant) | 10:32 |

Knebworth, 4 August 1979 (see Knebworth Festival 1979)
| No. | Title | Length |
|---|---|---|
| 1. | "Rock and Roll" (Bonham, Jones, Page, Plant) | 3:47 |
| 2. | "Nobody's Fault but Mine" (Page, Plant) | 5:45 |
| 3. | "Sick Again" (Page, Plant) | 5:08 |
| 4. | "Achilles Last Stand" (Page, Plant) | 9:03 |
| 5. | "In the Evening" (Jones, Page, Plant) | 7:56 |
| 6. | "Kashmir" (Bonham, Page, Plant) | 8:50 |
| 7. | "Whole Lotta Love" | 7:06 |
| 8. | "You'll Never Walk Alone" | 1:21 |

Credits
| No. | Title | Length |
|---|---|---|
| 1. | "Heartbreaker (Beginning part)" | 2:05 |

New York NBC Studio, 19 September 1970
| No. | Title | Length |
|---|---|---|
| 1. | "Press Conference" | 3:26 |

Sydney Showground, 27 February 1972
| No. | Title | Length |
|---|---|---|
| 1. | "Rock and Roll" | 3:06 |
| 2. | "Black Dog (Studio version excerpt)" | 1:48 |
| 3. | "John Bonham and John Paul Jones after concert interviews with Jeune Pritchard" |

BBC2 The Old Grey Whistle Test, 12 January 1975
| No. | Title | Length |
|---|---|---|
| 1. | "Robert Plant interview at the Vorst Nationaal in Brussels with Bob Harris" | 3:47 |

Remasters promo, October 1990
| No. | Title | Length |
|---|---|---|
| 1. | "Over the Hills and Far Away" (Page, Plant) | 4:49 |
| 2. | "Travelling Riverside Blues" (Robert Johnson, Page, Plant) | 4:09 |

== Menu clips ==
Royal Albert Hall, 9 January 1970

- Dressing room (pre-concert) – 0:27
- "Thank You" (Page/Plant) (organ outro excerpt) – 0:34
- "Heartbreaker" (guitar solo) – 0:36 (collage)

Reykjavik Airport, 22 June 1970

- "Moby Dick" (Bonham/Jones/Page) (drum solo excerpt) – 0:56 (collage)

Laugardalshöll, 22 June 1970

- "Dazed and Confused" (Page; inspired by Jake Holmes) (guitar bowing solo)

Sydney Showground, 27 February 1972

- "Black Dog" (Page/Plant/Jones) – 0:36

Madison Square Garden, 27 July 1973

- "Since I've Been Loving You" (Jones/Page/Plant) – 0:49

Madison Square Garden, 28 July 1973 (Knebworth campsite on 4 August 1979, video clip)

- "Over the Hills and Far Away" (Page/Plant) – 2:23

Seattle Center Coliseum, 21 March 1975

- "Whole Lotta Love (medley)" (Page/Bonham/Plant/Jones) (theremin solo and "The Crunge" excerpt from Earls Court, 25 May 1975) – 0:48

Earls Court, 24 May 1975 (streets of Belfast on 5 March 1971, clip)

- "Bron-Yr-Aur Stomp" (Page/Plant/Jones) – 0:49

Earls Court, 25 May 1975

- "Stairway to Heaven" (Page/Plant) (guitar intro) – 0:54 (collage edit)

LA Forum, 21 June 1977 (8 mm video clips from various 1977 performances)

- "The Song Remains the Same" (Page/Plant) – 5:37

== Charts ==
2003 sales chart performance for Led Zeppelin DVD
| Chart (2003) | Peak position |
|---|---|
| Australian DVDs Chart | 1 |
| Austrian Music DVDs Chart | 1 |
| Danish Music DVDs Chart | 5 |
| Dutch Music DVDs Chart | 2 |
| German Albums Chart | 18 |
| Irish Music DVDs Chart | 1 |
| Japanese DVDs Chart | 1 |
| Norwegian Music DVDs Chart | 1 |
| Swedish Music DVDs Chart | 1 |
| UK Official Video Chart | 3 |
| US Music Videos Chart | 1 |

2005 sales chart performance for Led Zeppelin DVD
| Chart (2005) | Peak position |
|---|---|
| Greek DVDs Chart | 8 |
| Hungarian DVDs Chart | 8 |

2007 sales chart performance for Led Zeppelin DVD
| Chart (2007) | Peak position |
|---|---|
| New Zealand Music DVDs Chart | 3 |

2012 sales chart performance for Led Zeppelin DVD
| Chart (2012) | Peak position |
|---|---|
| Finnish Music DVDs Chart | 1 |

== Certifications ==
Sales certifications for Led Zeppelin DVD
| Region | Certification | Certified units/sales |
|---|---|---|
| Argentina (CAPIF) | Platinum | 8,000^{^} |
| Australia (ARIA) | 7× Platinum | 105,000^{^} |
| Brazil (Pro-Música Brasil) | Diamond | 100,000^{*} |
| Canada (Music Canada) | 2× Diamond | 200,000^{^} |
| Finland (Musiikkituottajat) | Platinum | 10,006 |
| France (SNEP) | 3× Platinum | 60,000^{*} |
| New Zealand (RMNZ) | 2× Platinum | 10,000^{^} |
| United States (RIAA) | 13× Platinum | 650,000^{^} |
^{*} Sales figures based on certification alone.^{^} Shipments figures based on certification alone.

== Personnel ==
Led Zeppelin

- John Bonham – drums, percussion
- John Paul Jones – bass guitar, keyboards, Mellotron, mandolin
- Robert Plant – vocals, harmonica
- Jimmy Page – electric and acoustic guitars, production, creative director

Technical

- Dick Carruthers – production, creative director
- Kevin Shirley – sound engineering

== Technical notes ==
LPCM stereo (1536 kbit/s), Dolby Digital 5.1 surround sound, DTS 5.1 surround sound. Menu: Dolby Digital 2.0 stereo, Extras: Dolby Digital 2.0 stereo
