= Sick Again =

1975 song by Led Zeppelin

Song by Led Zeppelin

from the album Physical Graffiti
- Released: 24 February 1975
- Recorded: 1974
- Studio: Headley Grange, Headley, England; Olympic, London
- Genre: Blues rock; hard rock; glam rock
- Length: 4:40
- Label: Swan Song
- Songwriters: Jimmy Page; Robert Plant
- Producer: Jimmy Page

"Sick Again" is a song by English rock band Led Zeppelin from their 1975 album Physical Graffiti. It was written by singer Robert Plant. The song is about a group of teen groupies, which Plant referred to as "L.A. Queens", with whom the band were acquainted on their 1973 US Tour.

== Lyrics ==
Plant took pity upon these girls, who would flock to the hotel rooms of the band to offer them "favors". He also expressed distaste for how the girls involved in the scene got younger and younger. In an interview he gave in 1975, he provided an explanation of the lyrics:

If you listen to "Sick Again," a track from Physical Graffiti, the words show I feel a bit sorry for [the girls]. "Clutchin pages from your teenage dream in the lobby of the Hotel Paradise/Through the circus of the L.A. Queen how fast you learn the downhill slide." One minute she's 12 and the next minute she's 13 and over the top. Such a shame. They haven't got the style that they had in the old days ... way back in '68. L.A. infested with jaded 12-year-olds is not the L.A. I really dug.

== Live performances ==
Led Zeppelin frequently performed "Sick Again" in concert; during the 1975 and 1977 tours, it was often the second song they played. A performance from the 1979 Knebworth Festival is included on the Led Zeppelin DVD (2003) and Live E.P. (2025). The song was dropped for the band's final Tour Over Europe in 1980.

Page performed this song on his tour with the Black Crowes in 1999. A version of "Sick Again" performed by them can be found on the album Live at the Greek (2000).

== Personnel ==
According to Jean-Michel Guesdon and Philippe Margotin:

- Robert Plant – vocals
- Jimmy Page – electric guitars
- John Paul Jones – bass
- John Bonham – drums

== Bibliography ==
- Guesdon, Jean-Michel; Margotin, Philippe (2018). Led Zeppelin All the Songs: The Story Behind Every Track. Running Press. ISBN 978-0-316-448-67-3.
