= The Wanton Song =

Song by Led Zeppelin

from the album Physical Graffiti
- Released: 24 February 1975
- Recorded: 1974
- Studio: Headley Grange, Headley, England; Olympic, London
- Genre: Hard rock
- Length: 4:10
- Label: Swan Song
- Songwriters: Jimmy Page, Robert Plant
- Producer: Jimmy Page

"The Wanton Song" is a song by English rock band Led Zeppelin from their sixth studio album, 1975's Physical Graffiti. It was developed from a jam session during rehearsals.

== Recording ==
For his guitar solo, Page employed a backwards echo (where the echo is heard before the note), and also put his guitar through a Leslie speaker. This was a technique Page had himself used as far back as his work with the Yardbirds, and faced serious opposition from audio engineers when he tried it on the earliest Led Zeppelin recordings.

== Live performances ==
"The Wanton Song" was played live during some of the Led Zeppelin's European and American concerts in 1975, but was discontinued. On 8 May 1998, Page and Plant performed it on Later... with Jools Holland.

== Personnel ==
According to Jean-Michel Guesdon and Philippe Margotin:

- Robert Plant – vocals
- Jimmy Page – electric guitars
- John Paul Jones – bass (?), Clavinet
- John Bonham – drums

== See also ==
- List of cover versions of Led Zeppelin songs § The Wanton Song

== Bibliography ==
- Guesdon, Jean-Michel; Margotin, Philippe (2018). Led Zeppelin All the Songs: The Story Behind Every Track. Running Press. ISBN 978-0-316-448-67-3.
