= Earls Court 1975 =

1975 concerts by Led Zeppelin

- Concert by Led Zeppelin
- Location: Earls Court, London, England
- Associated album: Physical Graffiti
- Start date: 17 May 1975
- End date: 25 May 1975
- Legs: 1
- No. of shows: 5

Led Zeppelin concert chronology
- North America 1975; Earls Court 1975; North America 1977

Earls Court 1975 were five concerts performed by the English rock band Led Zeppelin at Earls Court Arena in London in May 1975.

== Overview ==
The concerts were initially booked for three nights on 23, 24 and 25 May, but due to unprecedented public demand (tickets for the three shows sold out within just four hours), two further dates were added for 17 and 18 May, making total ticket sales 85,000. Noted critic and film director Tony Palmer stated at the time in The Observer that no group in history had ever attracted such an audience in Britain.

These concerts took place less than two months following the conclusion of Led Zeppelin's 1975 North American tour. The whole of the band's 40-ton stage and light show was airlifted from the United States for the concerts. A huge Eidophor screen which showed the action as it was being filmed was also erected above the stage, at a cost of £10,000. This is thought to be one of the first occasions when such a device was used for a rock show in England. It was said that an entire city could be lit by the energy spent in a single concert. Three days of rehearsals took place in order to fix every possible detail or PA problem. The sound at the concerts was managed by Showco.

The Earls Court performances were promoted by Mel Bush. In an interview he gave several years after the event, Bush explained:

By that time [Led Zeppelin] were a huge attraction and I knew Peter (Grant) [Led Zeppelin's manager] wanted to present them in the biggest and best setting that particular year. I was the first concert promoter to use Earl's Court a couple of years before with David Bowie and Slade. So when Peter was considering venues to use he got in touch. Once it was all up and running we came to a good agreement about the ticket prices which Peter was always keen to keep at a reasonable level.

To help promote the concerts, Bush and Grant used advertisements which displayed a train, dubbed the "Zeppelin Express", linked to Earl's Court via the InterCity train services of British Rail. It was intended to convey the message that, despite all the concerts being performed in one location, they would be easily accessible to fans from all parts of the country. This image was featured on the concert's official poster (see above, right), the originals of which are now among the most collectible posters in rock history. The posters were produced, together with the design for the concert programme, by Martine Grainey of Peter Grainey Graphics of Bournemouth.

Five promotional DJs were given the task of introducing the band on stage at each show. These were Bob Harris (17 May), Johnnie Walker (18 May), Kid Jensen (23 May), Nicky Horne (24 May) and Alan Freeman (25 May).

All of the shows exceeded three hours in length, with the final 25 May concert clocking in at three hours, 43 minutes and 50 seconds. Footage from the concerts remained unavailable for public viewing for years, until parts of it were eventually released in 2003 for the Led Zeppelin DVD.

== Critical reaction ==
The Earls Court concerts are considered by some critics to be the best ever performed by the band, and the shows received generally excellent reviews from the music press, including those published in Sounds, New Musical Express and Melody Maker. Music journalist Chris Welch, who attended the performances, recalled years later:

The band played with tremendous fire, possessed by an almost demonic power, amidst clouds of smoke pierced by green laser beams. Jimmy Page flailed his violin bow against the guitar strings, producing eerie, echoing gothic howls. At the time, I wrote in a review that "Robert Plant maintains an essentially human, chatty approach to audiences, almost like a guide taking us through the story of the band, a jester at the wheel of some fearsome juggernaut, offering sly asides and poetic ruminations between moments of terrible power." ... The band enjoyed the Physical Graffiti material far more than the old war horses, and the best moments from the previous albums came in the shape of ballads and acoustic songs.

According to Led Zeppelin archivist Dave Lewis:

When Led Zeppelin undertook the series of five shows at London's Earl's Court Arena on May of 1975 they were at the very peak of their creative powers. Spurred on by the critical and commercial success of their sixth album, the double set Physical Graffiti, each show they played took on event-like proportions. The 17,000 capacity Earl's Court afforded them the luxury to showcase in the best possible setting, the sheer enormity of their stage act. Over five nights of May '75 Zeppelin delivered perhaps the most impressive series of shows of their entire career ... Photographic images from the shows still light up the pages of countless Zep features and books, bootleg performances are eagerly snapped up, and the official video footage of the gigs projects the sheer magnitude and power of Led Zeppelin in full flight more than any other surviving film of the group.

== Set list ==
For these concerts, the band revived an acoustic section that had been a component of many of their concert tours until late 1972, when it had been discarded from their set.

The set list for these five concerts was:

1. "Rock and Roll" (Page, Plant, Jones, Bonham)
2. "Sick Again" (Page, Plant)
3. "Over the Hills and Far Away" (Page, Plant)
4. "In My Time of Dying" (Page, Plant, Jones, Bonham)
5. "The Song Remains the Same" (Page, Plant)
6. "The Rain Song" (Page, Plant)
7. "Kashmir" (Bonham, Page, Plant)
8. "No Quarter" (Page, Plant, Jones)
9. "Tangerine" (Page)
10. "Going to California" (Page, Plant)
11. "That's the Way" (Page, Plant)
12. "Bron-Yr-Aur Stomp" (Page, Plant, Jones)
13. "Trampled Under Foot" (Page, Plant, Jones) (incl. "Gallows Pole")
14. "Moby Dick" (Bonham, Jones, Page)
15. "Dazed and Confused" (Page) (incl. "Woodstock"/"San Francisco (Be Sure to Wear Flowers in Your Hair)")
16. "Stairway to Heaven" (Page, Plant)

Encores:

- "Whole Lotta Love" (Bonham, Dixon, Jones, Page, Plant) (incl. "The Crunge")
- "Black Dog" (Page, Plant, Jones) (incl. "Out on the Tiles")

Additional encores on the last show, on 25 May:

- "Heartbreaker" (Bonham, Page, Plant)
- "Communication Breakdown" (Bonham, Jones, Page) (incl. "D'yer Mak'er")

== Tour dates ==
Date	City	Country	Venue
17 May 1975	London	England	Earls Court Arena
18 May 1975	London	England	Earls Court Arena
23 May 1975	London	England	Earls Court Arena
24 May 1975	London	England	Earls Court Arena
25 May 1975	London	England	Earls Court Arena

== Cancelled North American tour dates ==
A North American tour consisting of 33 dates was planned for August–September 1975, but due to Robert Plant's serious car accident, it was cancelled. Some of the dates the tour would have consisted of include:

Date	City	Country	Venue
23 August 1975	Oakland	United States	Alameda County Coliseum
24 August 1975	Oakland	United States	Alameda County Coliseum
27 August 1975	Tempe	United States	Tempe Stadium
29 August 1975	Kansas City	United States	Arrowhead Stadium
31 August 1975	Atlanta	United States	Fulton County Stadium
1 September 1975	Tampa	United States	Tampa Stadium
2 September 1975	Louisville	United States	Kentucky Fairgrounds Stadium
4 September 1975	New Orleans	United States	Louisiana Superdome
6 September 1975	Pasadena	United States	Rose Bowl
8 September 1975	Denver	United States	Mile High Stadium
9 September 1975	Norman	United States	Lloyd Noble Center

There were also plans for a trip to South America afterwards, followed by a UK tour in winter 1976 and Europe in spring; however, these plans were shelved.

The band did play a 45-minute impromptu show on 16 December 1975 in Jersey. The band would not perform live again until their next tour in 1977.

== Sources ==
- Lewis, Dave and Pallett, Simon (1997) Led Zeppelin: The Concert File, London: Omnibus Press. ISBN 0-7119-5307-4.
