= Ian Knight (stage designer) =

British stage designer

Ian Knight (12 August 1940, in Eastcote – 20 March 2010) was a British stage designer, best known for his work with the Rolling Stones, Led Zeppelin, Genesis and Rod Stewart. He developed effects, including using lasers and large-screen projections, for concerts at Knebworth Park.

== Biography ==
Knight was raised in Eastcote and attended Harrow Art School. He worked as a stage designer at the Yvonne Arnaud theatre (Guildford, Surrey) and the Belgrade theatre (Coventry), before becoming freelance, working out of central London from 1964. He worked with Soft Machine in the late 1960s, as well as designing for London clubs Middle Earth, UFO, and Implosion. He staged many concerts at the Roundhouse in Chalk Farm, including the Rolling Stones, Jimi Hendrix, The Doors and Elton John. From 1968 on, he helped stage a number of free concerts in Hyde Park, including the Rolling Stones, and a performance at the Royal Albert Hall including The Who and Chuck Berry on the same day. Festival work followed. In 1971, he oversaw the stage rebuild and further work for the new Rainbow theatre (formerly the Finsbury Park Astoria).

Knight moved to Los Angeles, USA, and did stage design for Led Zeppelin, Genesis and Wings. He provided art direction and lighting design for Led Zeppelin's film The Song Remains the Same in 1976, in which he also appeared.

Work with Genesis pioneered the use of the VL1 computer-controlled moving spotlight. In 1981, Knight worked on Ronald Reagan's inaugural ball, at which he surreptitiously introduced a troupe of transvestite trapeze artists. In the mid-1980s, Knight worked within Rod Stewart's design team, including devising storylines in collaboration with Stewart.
