= The Song Remains the Same (film) =

1976 Led Zeppelin concert film

- Theatrical release poster
- Directed by: Peter Clifton; Joe Massot
- Starring: John Bonham; John Paul Jones; Jimmy Page; Robert Plant
- Cinematography: Ernest Day
- Edited by: Humphrey Dixon
- Music by: Led Zeppelin
- Distributed by: Warner Bros. Pictures
- Release date: 20 October 1976 (US)
- Running time: 138 minutes
- Countries: United Kingdom; United States
- Language: English
- Box office: $12 million

The Song Remains the Same is a 1976 concert film featuring the English rock band Led Zeppelin. The filming took place during the summer of 1973, during three nights of concerts at Madison Square Garden in New York City, with additional footage shot at Shepperton Studios in Surrey. The film premiered three years later on 20 October 1976 at Cinema I in New York, on 21 October 1976 at the Fox Wilshire Theater in Beverly Hills, and at Warner West End Cinema in London two weeks later. It was accompanied by a soundtrack album of the same name.

Promotional materials stated that the film was "the band's special way of giving their millions of friends what they had been clamouring for – a personal and private tour of Led Zeppelin. For the first time the world has a front row seat on Led Zeppelin."

Fans drove up ticket sales, but many reviewers – as well as band members Robert Plant and John Paul Jones – disliked the film at the time of its initial release (1976), although in subsequent years critics warmed up to the movie and it now receives mostly favourable ratings from the public.

A standard DVD of the film was released on 31 December 1999. A reissue of the film, including previously unreleased footage as a bonus, was released on DVD, HD DVD, and Blu-ray Disc on 20 November 2007, by Warner Home Video.

== Background ==
Since late 1969, Led Zeppelin had been planning on filming one of their live performances for a projected movie documentary of the band. The group's manager, Peter Grant, believed that they would be better served by the big screen than by television, because he regarded the sound quality of the latter as unsatisfactory. In 1970, Grant arranged for the 9 January Royal Albert Hall performance to be filmed by In Concert and Top of the Pops producer and director Stanley Dorfman, and Peter Whitehead, for a proposed hour-long special for TV distribution, which was reported by Record Mirror in late January had been sold to American TV. However the band supplied a pulse feed off their mixing desk for the editing purposes but were not sufficiently happy with their performance to release the full soundtrack for use in the film. It was agreed with Dorfman that the concert would form part of a larger documentary project including the band's performance at the Bath Festival on 28 June, which was filmed by Whitehead. However, Whitehead filmed the entire Zeppelin set in Bath at the incorrect exposure and it was unusable, so the project was shelved." The Royal Albert Hall footage was later remastered and featured on the 2003 release Led Zeppelin DVD.

On the morning of 20 July 1973, during the band's concert tour of the US, Peter Grant made contact with American-born director Joe Massot. Massot was already known to Grant as he and his wife had moved into a house in Berkshire in 1970, where they made friends with their neighbours, Led Zeppelin guitarist Jimmy Page and his girlfriend Charlotte Martin. Grant had previously turned down offers by Massot to make a film of the band, but with the huge success of the band's current tour, Grant changed his mind and offered him the job of director. As Grant recalled:

It all started in the Sheraton Hotel, Boston. We'd talked about a film for years and Jimmy had known Joe Massot was interested – so we called them and over they came. It was all very quickly arranged.

Massot hurriedly assembled a crew in time for Led Zeppelin's last leg of the tour starting on 23 July 1973, in Baltimore. He subsequently filmed the group's three concert performances at Madison Square Garden on the nights of 27, 28, and 29 July 1973. The film was entirely financed by the band and shot on 35mm with a 24-track quadraphonic sound recording.

== Original filming ==
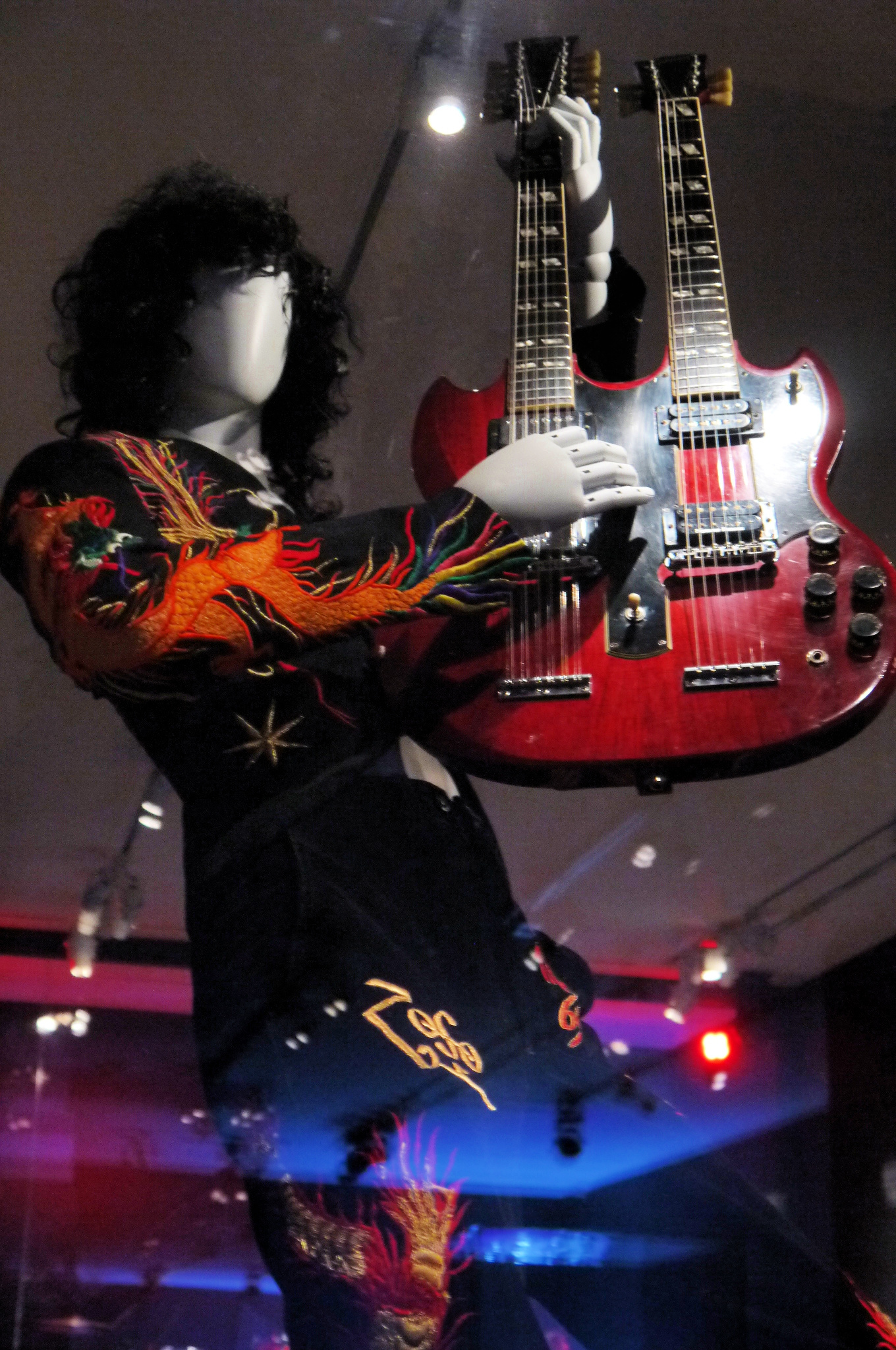
Gibson EDS-1275 used for live performances of "Stairway to Heaven" including in this film

The plans to film the shows at Madison Square Garden were threatened when the local trades union tried to block the British film crew from working. After the band's attorneys negotiated with the union, the crew was allowed to film the concerts.

The footage of the band arriving at the airport in their private jet airliner, The Starship, and travelling in the motorcade to the concert was filmed in Pittsburgh, before their show at Three Rivers Stadium on 24 July 1973.

For the band's three New York performances, two band members, Robert Plant and John Bonham, wore the same clothes to facilitate seamless editing of the film, but John Paul Jones and Jimmy Page wore different sets of attire on some of the nights, which created continuity problems. Page is seen wearing a different dragon suit in "Rock and Roll" and the "Celebration Day" remaster which was not an editing error; Page wore a new outfit for those shows which came with a heavy jacket, and he took it off after three songs. In an interview from 1997, Jones said that the reason he did not wear the same stage clothes was that he asked the crew if they would be filming on those nights and was told no. "I'd think 'not to worry, I'll save the shirt I wore the previous night for the next filming'. Then what would happen is that I'd get onstage and see the cameras ready to roll." Grant stated "It turned out to be traumatic to say the least. They filmed three nights at the Garden and never got one complete take of 'Whole Lotta Love'."

As Led Zeppelin's popularity soared throughout the 1970s, Peter Grant became increasingly notorious for being brutally protective of his band and their finances; The Song Remains the Same captures one such exchange between him and a concert promoter. When Warner Bros. Pictures approved the film, they did so with the proviso that expletives would be 'bleeped' out. Peter Clifton took the optical print and removed the words, and the film was given an appropriate rating. However, on every other print, the words were retained and were fully audible.

In the scene where Peter Grant is driven to the police station to be questioned about the theft from the safe deposit box at the Drake Hotel, he has his arm outside the police car. According to an interview conducted in 1989, he explained the reason he was not handcuffed was that the policeman driving the car used to be a drummer in a semi-professional band which had supported the Yardbirds on one of its US college tours in the late-1960s. Grant had at the time been manager of the Yardbirds. The money stolen from the safe deposit box at the Drake Hotel was never recovered, and while no one has ever been charged, it is alleged that a staff member of the hotel quit their job and fled to Jamaica soon after the theft. Scenes of young fans attempting to buy tickets, an unruly fan being ejected by security, and Grant berating the promoter for receiving kickbacks were all shot at the Baltimore Civic Center on 23 July 1973. Grant purportedly recommended the "Dazed and Confused" sequence wherein the camera zooms into Page's eyes and cuts to the scene. Some unused backstage shots filmed at Baltimore and at Pittsburgh later found their way into the promotional video for "Travelling Riverside Blues", released in 1990.

== Subsequent filming and release ==
Dissatisfied with the progress of the film, Grant had Massot removed from the project and Australian director Peter Clifton was hired in his place in early 1974. Massot was offered a few thousand pounds in compensation. Peter Grant later sent someone to Massot's house to collect the film. However, Massot had hidden the film elsewhere and so instead an expensive editing machine owned by Massot was taken as collateral. Massot served a writ, leading to a period of stalemate which was finally broken when Grant and Led Zeppelin's lawyer Steve Weiss agreed to pay Massot the money he was owed, after which he delivered the film to the band. Massot was not invited to attend the premiere of the film at New York but he attended anyway, buying a ticket from a ticket tout outside the theatre.

Clifton, realising that there were crucial holes in the concert footage, suggested that the entire show be recreated at Shepperton Studios in August 1974, on a mock-up of the Madison Square Garden stage. Gerry Harrison, who worked with Peter Clifton at the Shepperton Studios film shoot stated that "the band mimed only the missing parts of the film."

When it was agreed that the band would meet at Shepperton Studios for filming, Jones had recently had his hair cut short, so he had to wear a wig.

In the May 2008 issue of Uncut, Page recalled the events surrounding the shooting of additional footage at Shepperton Studios:

I'm sort of miming at Shepperton to what I'd played at Madison Square Garden, but of course, although I've got a rough approximation of what I was playing from night to night, it's not exact. So the film that came out in the '70s is a bit warts-and-all.

A plan to shoot additional footage on the band's Autumn 1975 US tour was abandoned due to Plant's car crash in Rhodes, Greece.

In 1976 a midnight screening of the film was organised by Atlantic Records before its release, at which label president Ahmet Ertegun reportedly fell asleep.

The Song Remains the Same was finally completed by early 1976, 18 months behind schedule and over-budget. Peter Grant later quipped "It was the most expensive home movie ever made". It grossed $200,000 in its first week at the box office.

== Critical reaction and popularity ==
For its New York premiere, Cinema I was equipped with a quadrophonic sound system hired from Showco in Dallas. For the West Coast premieres, no such audio boosting was employed. These premieres, along with the London premiere, were attended by the members of the band.

The film performed well at the box office, grossing an estimated $10 million by 1977. Despite this, the film was reviewed negatively by critics for its perceived amateurish production and self-indulgent content, with the fantasy sequences in particular receiving some of the harshest criticism. The film was particularly unsuccessful in the UK, where the band had not performed live for over two years as a result of being in tax exile. The band were thus unable to promote themselves at home, leaving them out of the public spotlight.

However, among fans the film has retained its popularity. Until the release of Led Zeppelin DVD in 2003, The Song Remains the Same was the only official live visual document that was accessible to followers of the band. It became a cult favourite at late-night movie houses, and its subsequent release on video and then DVD has ensured a growing base of fans.

Some members of the band regard the performances filmed at Madison Square Garden as merely average for the time, coming as they did at the end of a long and exhausting tour, but nonetheless representative of the generally high standard of the band's live performances during this era. In an interview he gave with New Musical Express in November 1976, Page stated:

The Song Remains The Same is not a great film, but there's no point in making excuses. It's just a reasonably honest statement of where we were at that particular time. It's very difficult for me to watch it now, but I'd like to see it in a year's time just to see how it stands up.

Page ultimately included footage from this series of concerts in 2003's Led Zeppelin DVD.

Other members of the band were less favourable, with Jones calling the film "a massive compromise" and Plant denouncing it as "a load of bollocks."

The film has been viewed as an interesting historical document that captures the band near the peak of their popularity, showcasing the excesses of the music and show business industries in the 1970s. In a Mojo magazine review published after the film's 2007 reissue, James McNair gave the film four out of five stars and wrote:

The good news is that Jimmy Page and fellow production wunderkind Kevin Shirley have been meticulous as regards quality control. The three-night, July 1973 stint at Madison square garden that fuelled the film's original soundtrack has been plundered afresh ... In truth, 2003's DVD package houses better live performances, but if you want to catch Zeppelin in all their preposterous, 'because we can' glory, The Song Remains ... is the one.

On Rotten Tomatoes, the film has a 40% rating based on 40 reviews with the consensus: "While its concert segments are presented with a whole lotta love, The Song Remains the Same gets trampled underfoot with its dull fantasy segments and middling insights into the band."

== DVD scene listing ==
1. Mob Rubout
2. Mob Town Credits
3. Country Life ("Autumn Lake")
4. "Bron-Yr-Aur"
5. "Rock and Roll"
6. "Black Dog"
7. "Since I've Been Loving You"
8. "No Quarter"
9. Who's Responsible?
10. "The Song Remains the Same"
11. "The Rain Song"
12. Fire and Sword
13. Capturing the Castle
14. Not Quite Backstage Pass
15. "Dazed and Confused"
16. Strung Out
17. Magic in the Night
18. Gate Crasher
19. No Comment
20. "Stairway to Heaven"
21. "Moby Dick"
22. Country Squire Bonham
23. "Heartbreaker"
24. Grand Theft
25. "Whole Lotta Love"
26. End Credits (w/ "Stairway to Heaven")

== Chart positions ==
=== DVD ===
Chart (2003)	Peak position
Norwegian Music Chart	1
Finnish Music Chart	3
Italian FIMI Music DVD chart	18
Hungarian MAHASZ Top 20 DVDs Chart	1

== Certifications ==
Certifications for The Song Remains the Same
Region	Certification	Certified units/sales
United Kingdom (BPI)	6× Platinum	300,000^{*}
^{*} Sales figures based on certification alone.

== Cast ==
- Jimmy Page
- Robert Plant
- John Bonham
- John Paul Jones
- Peter Grant
- Richard Cole
- Roy Harper
- Colin Rigdon
- Derek Skilton

== Personnel ==
Led Zeppelin

- John Bonham – drums, percussion
- John Paul Jones – bass guitar, keyboards
- Jimmy Page – guitars, theremin, backing vocals, production, sound editing, mixing
- Robert Plant – vocals, tambourine

Additional personnel

- Peter Clifton – director
- Brian Condliffe – technician
- Cameron Crowe – liner notes
- Ernie Day – camera operator
- Robert Freeman – camera operator
- David Gladwell – editor
- Peter Grant – executive producer
- Mick Hinton – technician
- Eddie Kramer – sound engineer
- Ian Knight – visual effects and lighting
- Benji Le Fevre – technician
- Joe Massot – director
- Shelly – special effects
- Ray Thomas – technician
- Steven Weiss – shoot trouble
- Kirby Wyatt – visual effects and lighting

== 2007 reissue ==
On 20 November 2007, Warner Home Video released a new DVD edition of The Song Remains The Same for the first time with all fifteen songs from the original Madison Square Garden concerts. This coincided with the reissue of the accompanying soundtrack to the film, available on CD. The DVD features newly remixed and fully remastered sound, 5.1 Dolby Digital and DTS surround sound from original master tracks, and includes more than 40 minutes of added bonus material, including never-before-released performance footage of "Over the Hills and Far Away" and "Celebration Day", plus performances of "Misty Mountain Hop" and "The Ocean", a rare 1976 BBC interview with Robert Plant and Peter Grant, vintage TV footage from the Drake Hotel robbery during the New York concert stand, and a Cameron Crowe radio show. This version was released on standard DVDs as well as Blu-ray and HD DVD.

A Collector's Edition box set including a T-shirt with the original album cover, placards from the New York shows, and several glossy photographs was released as well.

Due to legal complications, the band decided not to change the video portion of the original movie for the rerelease. Instead, sound engineer Kevin Shirley created an entirely new mix of the three 1973 Madison Square Garden concerts so that the audio portion of the film would better match the on-screen visuals. The audio on the new CD release is nearly identical to the soundtrack of the new DVD release. One difference is that the songs included on the CDs that were not featured in the original movie are included as bonus tracks on the DVD.
