= Communication Breakdown =

1969 single by Led Zeppelin

Single by Led Zeppelin

from the album Led Zeppelin
- A-side: "Good Times Bad Times"
- Released: 10 March 1969
- Recorded: 3 October 1968
- Studio: Olympic, London
- Genre: Hard rock; proto-metal; proto-punk
- Length: 2:26
- Label: Atlantic
- Songwriters: John Bonham; John Paul Jones; Jimmy Page; Robert Plant (Note: Plant was not originally credited as a writer because of unexpired contractual obligations to CBS Records, although he received a credit later.)
- Producer: Jimmy Page

Led Zeppelin singles chronology
"Communication Breakdown" (1969)	"Whole Lotta Love" (1969)

"Communication Breakdown" is a song by the English rock band Led Zeppelin, from their 1969 self-titled debut album. It was also used as the B-side of the group's first single in the US, "Good Times Bad Times". A promotional video was released, with the group miming to the recording, which is included on the Led Zeppelin DVD (2003).

== Background and composition ==
The song's original title was "Too Good", and it had been performed during the band's 1968 Scandinavian Tour. It developed from a guitar riff played by Jimmy Page, while the rest of the band wrote the song around it. Bassist John Paul Jones later said "This is Page's riff – you can tell instantly". Singer Robert Plant could not receive a songwriting credit owing to a previous record contract, and consequently it was credited simply to the other three band members.

== Personnel ==
According to Jean-Michel Guesdon and Philippe Margotin:

- Robert Plant – vocals
- Jimmy Page – guitars, backing vocals
- John Paul Jones – bass, organ, backing vocals (?)
- John Bonham – drums, backing vocals (?)

== Live versions ==
"Communication Breakdown" was part of the group's initial live set in 1968. It was played at every gig until 1970, after which it was featured as an encore. The group played it on at least one show for all subsequent tours, including their residency at Earl's Court, London in 1975, the second appearance at the 1979 Knebworth Festival, and the band's final tour in 1980. Plant played it on some of his solo tours, while Jones performed it live with Diamanda Galás in 1994.

On the Led Zeppelin BBC Sessions, released in 1997, this song was featured three times, each with a slightly different improvisation by the group. Three live versions–taken from performances at the TV program Tous en scène in Paris in 1969, at Danmarks Radio in 1969 and at the Royal Albert Hall in 1970–can also be seen on the Led Zeppelin DVD. The version of "Good Times Bad Times/Communication Breakdown" released on 15 April 2014, on iTunes, is from 10 October 1969 in Paris, on the European Tour of Autumn 1969.

== Legacy ==
"Communication Breakdown"
Sample with guitar riff

The Dictators' bassist Andy Shernoff states that Page's guitar riff of rapid downstrokes in "Communication Breakdown" was an inspiration for the Ramones' guitarist Johnny Ramone's downstroke guitar style. Ramone stated in the documentary Ramones: The True Story that he built up skill at his downstroke playing style by playing the song over and over again for the bulk of his early career.

The song was used in the American animated sitcom The Simpsons. In a 2006 episode titled "G.I. (Annoyed Grunt)", a group of soldiers with guitars play the riff during a recruitment drive at a crowded stadium. According to author Jonathan Pieslak, the scene is "clearly satirical ... the ending scene references rock music and implies that being in the military is somehow like being at a rock concert".

== See also ==
- List of cover versions of Led Zeppelin songs § Communication Breakdown

== Bibliography ==
- Case, George (2009). Jimmy Page: Magus, Musician, Man: An Unauthorized Biography. Backbeat Books. ISBN 978-0-87930-947-3.
- Guesdon, Jean-Michel; Margotin, Philippe (2018). Led Zeppelin All the Songs: The Story Behind Every Track. Running Press. ISBN 978-0-316-448-67-3.
- True, Everett (2002). Hey Ho Let's Go: The Story of the Ramones. Omnibus Press. ISBN 978-1-8444-9413-2.
- Hoskyns, Barney (2006). Led Zeppelin IV: Rock of Ages. Rodale. ISBN 978-1-60961-695-3.
- Lewis, Dave (1990). Led Zeppelin: A Celebration. Omnibus Press. ISBN 978-0-711-92416-1.
- Lewis, Dave (2012). From A Whisper to A Scream: The Complete Guide to the Music of Led Zeppelin. Omnibus Press. ISBN 978-0-857-12788-4.
- Pieslak, Jonathan R. (2009). Sound Targets: American Soldiers and Music in the Iraq War. Indiana University Press. ISBN 978-0-253-22087-5.
