= Peter Grant (music manager) =

English music manager (1935–1995)

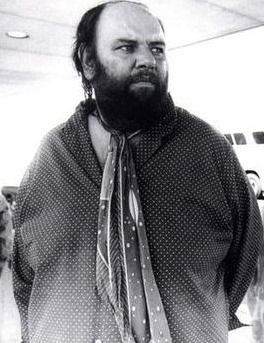

Background information
- Born: Peter Grant; 5 April 1935
- Origin: South Norwood, London, England
- Died: 21 November 1995 (aged 60) Eastbourne, Sussex, England
- Occupation: Music manager
- Years active: 1963–1995
- Formerly of: Led Zeppelin, the Yardbirds, the Jeff Beck Group, Terry Reid, the New Vaudeville Band, Bad Company, Maggie Bell, the Nashville Teens, Stone the Crows
- Website: ledzeppelin.com

Peter Grant (5 April 1935 – 21 November 1995) was an English music manager, best known as the manager of Led Zeppelin from their creation in 1968 to their breakup in 1980. With his intimidating size and weight, confrontational manner, knowledge and experience, Grant was able to procure strong and unprecedented deals for Led Zeppelin, and is widely credited with improving pay and conditions for all musicians in dealings with concert promoters.

Grant has been described as "one of the shrewdest and most ruthless managers in rock history". He was also a record executive for Swan Song Records.

== Early life ==
Grant was born in the south London suburb of South Norwood, England. His mother Dorothy worked as a secretary. He attended Sir Walter St John School in Grayshott, Hampshire, before the Second World War, and completed his schooling at Charterhouse School in Godalming, Surrey, to which he was evacuated along with other London school children. After the war, Grant returned to South Norwood until leaving at age 13, when he became a sheet metal factory worker in Croydon. He left that job after a few weeks, and then obtained employment on Fleet Street delivering photographs for Reuters.

Grant was soon attracted to the entertainment industry, and worked as a stagehand for the Croydon Empire Theatre until 1953, when he was called up for national service in the Royal Army Ordnance Corps, where he reached the rank of corporal. He worked briefly as an entertainment manager at a hotel in Jersey before being employed as a bouncer and doorman at London's 2i's Coffee Bar, where Cliff Richard, Adam Faith, Tommy Steele and often played. The co-owner of the 2i's bar, professional wrestler Paul Lincoln, encouraged Grant to appear on television as a wrestler under the titles "Count Massimo" and "Count Bruno Alassio of Milan," using his 6' 5" frame to good effect.

== Acting career ==
Grant's brief dalliance with wrestling kindled his enthusiasm for acting, and he was hired by film studios as a bit part actor, stuntman, and body double. Between 1958 and 1963, Grant appeared in a number of films, including A Night to Remember (1958) in which he played a crew member on the Titanic; The Guns of Navarone (1961) in which he played a British commando; and Cleopatra (1963) in which he played a palace guard. He also appeared in television shows such as The Saint, Crackerjack, Dixon of Dock Green, and The Benny Hill Show. He was Robert Morley's body double on many of that actor's films.

== Artist management ==
The money Grant made from acting and related ventures was invested in his own entertainment transport business. As his acting roles dried up, he provided transportation between concerts for bands such as the Shadows. Starting in 1963, often in conjunction with promoter Don Arden, Grant moved into touring management, overseeing UK tours by acts such as Chuck Berry, Gene Vincent, Bo Diddley, the Everly Brothers, Little Richard, Brian Hyland, and the Animals. By 1964, Grant started to manage his own acts including the Nashville Teens, an all-girl group called She Trinity, the New Vaudeville Band, The Jeff Beck Group, Terry Reid, and Stone the Crows. His management firm was established in the same London office used by his friend, record producer Mickie Most, who had previously worked with Grant at the 2i's Coffee Bar. Most and Grant together set up RAK Music Management, an offshoot of Most's Rak Records.

In late 1966, Simon Napier-Bell asked Grant to take over management of the Yardbirds, who were constantly touring yet struggling financially. Mickie Most had suggested to Napier-Bell that Grant would be an asset to the Yardbirds, but as it happened his arrival was too late to save the band. The experience, however, gave him ideas which were put to good use later with Led Zeppelin. As he explained:

When I started managing the Yardbirds, they weren't getting the hit singles, but were on the college circuit and underground scene in America. Instead of trying to get played on Top 40 radio, I realised that there was another market. We were the first UK act to get booked at places like the Fillmore. The scene was changing.

Grant's no-nonsense approach to promoters and his persuasive presence were influential in the Yardbirds making reliable money from concerts for the first time. Grant traveled closely with the Yardbirds, ensuring that all costs were kept to a minimum, that members were paid on time, and that the band retained artistic control. Unlike most other managers at the time who rarely set foot in a music venue, Grant's approach was hands-on.

== Led Zeppelin ==
The Yardbirds dissolved in 1968, with all band members departing except guitarist Jimmy Page, who constructed a new group to fulfill a contractual agreement to tour Europe. They were temporarily known as the New Yardbirds before changing their name to Led Zeppelin. Page recruited Grant to be the band's manager. Page and Grant has so much mutual trust that Grant's management of the band until their breakup in 1980 was based solely on a gentlemen's agreement.

It is doubtful whether Led Zeppelin would have been as successful without Grant as their manager. He negotiated the group's sizeable five-year record contract with Atlantic Records, and his business philosophy would eventually pay off for the label. Grant strongly believed that bands could make more money, and have more artistic merit, by focusing their efforts on albums rather than singles. Live performances were deemed more important than television appearances – if one wanted to see Led Zeppelin, one had to experience their performances in person.

Led Zeppelin's particular success in the United States can partly be credited to Grant's keen sense of US audiences and the vast underground movement that was sweeping the country. It was his knowledge of the American touring scene that thrust Led Zeppelin into the forefront of the burgeoning American rock market, and under his stewardship the great majority of Led Zeppelin concerts were performed in the United States, resulting in massive profits for the group. He ensured that the vast bulk of ticket proceeds wound up with the band rather than promoters and booking agents, and is reported to have secured up to 90% of gate proceeds from concerts performed by the band, an unprecedented feat. By taking this approach he set a new standard for artist management.

Grant's determination to protect the financial interests of Led Zeppelin was also reflected by the sometimes extraordinary measures he took to combat the practice of unauthorized live bootleg recordings. He is reported to have visited record stores in London that were selling Led Zeppelin bootlegs and demanded all copies be handed over. He also monitored the crowd at Led Zeppelin concerts in order to locate anything which resembled bootleg recording equipment. At one concert at Vancouver in 1971, he saw what he thought was such equipment on the floor of the venue and ensured that it was destroyed, only to later learn that it was a noise pollution unit being operated by city officials to test the volume of the concert. On another occasion, at the Bath Festival in 1970, he threw a bucket of water over unauthorised recording equipment.

Grant had complete and unwavering faith in Led Zeppelin. Unlike some other managers of the era, he never compromised his clients by exploiting them for short-term profit, instead always putting their interests first, and being a manager that split the profits five ways, between Grant and the other members of the band. This was demonstrated by his decision to never release the popular songs from Led Zeppelin's albums as singles in the UK, out of respect for the band's desire to develop the concept of album-oriented rock. As was explained by bassist John Paul Jones:

[Peter] trusted us to get the music together, and then just kept everybody else away, making sure we had the space to do whatever we wanted without interference from anybody – press, record company, promoters. He only had us [as clients] and reckoned that if we were going to do good, then he would do good. He always believed that we would be hugely successful and people became afraid not to go along with his terms in case they missed out.

Grant's past experience in handling stars such as Jerry Lee Lewis and Gene Vincent also provided him with a grounding in how to manage the pandemonium which frequently surrounded Led Zeppelin, particularly whilst the band was on tour. Grant himself said that "Led Zeppelin looks after the music and I do everything else – and if it takes some strong measures to get our way, then so be it." According to rock journalist Steven Rosen:

Peter Grant, former bouncer and wrestler, was, in many respects, the physical embodiment of a Led Zeppelin. Standing over six feet and weighing over 300 pounds, he used his intimidating presence to maintain order and to keep his charges safe and worry-free ... His raison d'etre was simple – protecting his band and their finances. When a bootlegger or unauthorised photographer was identified, it was the lucky infringing party who was let off with merely a severe verbal reprimand and confiscation of unauthorised T-shirts and film.

Although there were media reports of his heavy-handed, intimidating tactics, Grant was respected in the business. Jones said, "Peter was a very sensitive man. He was a very, very smart man. People just think of his size and his reputation, but actually he never had to use his size. He could out-talk anybody."

In January 1972, Bernard Chevry, manager of the Midem music business, festival wrote to Grant, asking for "Led Zeppelin and his backing group" to appear. Grant was annoyed that Chevry did not realise Led Zeppelin was a group, and in response took out a full-page advertisement in the trade paper Record Retailer, showing the original Midem letter, captioned "Mr Zeppelin Regrets". The response was seen by most of the music industry, and humiliated Chevry. Grant later described Chevry as "a prat".

Grant was instrumental in setting up Led Zeppelin's publishing company, Superhype Music, in 1968. He was also the driving force in establishing Swan Song Records in 1974, which gave Led Zeppelin further financial and artistic control over its products. Although Led Zeppelin was Grant's sole management client during their early years, he later assumed management of other bands signed to Swan Song, such as Stone the Crows, Bad Company, and Maggie Bell. In 1975, he turned down a lucrative offer to manage Queen. When he was once questioned on what was the single most important thing a manager could say, Grant's response was "Know when to say 'no'." In 1977, he was asked by Colonel Tom Parker to manage a proposed concert tour of Europe by Elvis Presley, but Elvis died on 16 August 1977, just as negotiations had commenced.

=== Oakland incident ===
Towards the end Led Zeppelin's 1977 US tour, an incident occurred during their first of two concerts at the Oakland Coliseum on 23 July. First, it was alleged Grant's security employee John Bindon pushed a member of promoter Bill Graham's stage crew out of the way as the band entered the stadium via a backstage ramp. Tension had been simmering between Graham's staff and Led Zeppelin's security team during the day, and as Grant and Bindon were walking down the ramp near the end of the concert, words were exchanged with stage crew chief Jim Downey, which resulted in Bindon knocking Downey unconscious.

Minutes later, Graham's security employee Jim Matzorkis reprimanded Grant's 11-year-old son Warren over the removal of a dressing room sign, after which Matzorkis was cornered in a trailer and brutally beaten by Grant, Bindon. and tour manager Richard Cole, requiring hospitalization afterwards. The band, except drummer for John Bonham, were performing onstage and were unaware of what was transpiring backstage; Bonham was backstage at the moment and allegedly took part in the beating. Grant threatened to cancel the following Oakland concert, and only agreed to let that show proceed after threatening Graham to sign a letter of indemnification absolving Led Zeppelin from responsibility for the first night's incident.

Members of the band returned to their hotel after the first concert, and were awakened the next morning by a surprise police raid after Graham had changed his mind and decided to press charges. Graham refused to honour the indemnification letter because, according to legal advice, he was under no obligation to agree to its terms. Bindon, Grant, Cole, and Bonham were arrested but released on bail so they could travel to the next date on the Led Zeppelin tour, but just a few days later, the rest of the tour was cancelled due to the sudden death of singer Robert Plant's son Karac.

As they returned to Britain, a suit was filed against Grant and Led Zeppelin by Graham for $2 million. After months of legal wrangling, the parties offered to settle and Grant, Bindon, Cole, and Bonham pleaded nolo contendere, receiving suspended sentences and undisclosed fines. Bindon had already been dismissed by the band upon their return to Britain. Grant later stated that allowing Bindon to be hired was the biggest mistake he made as manager.

== Final years and death ==
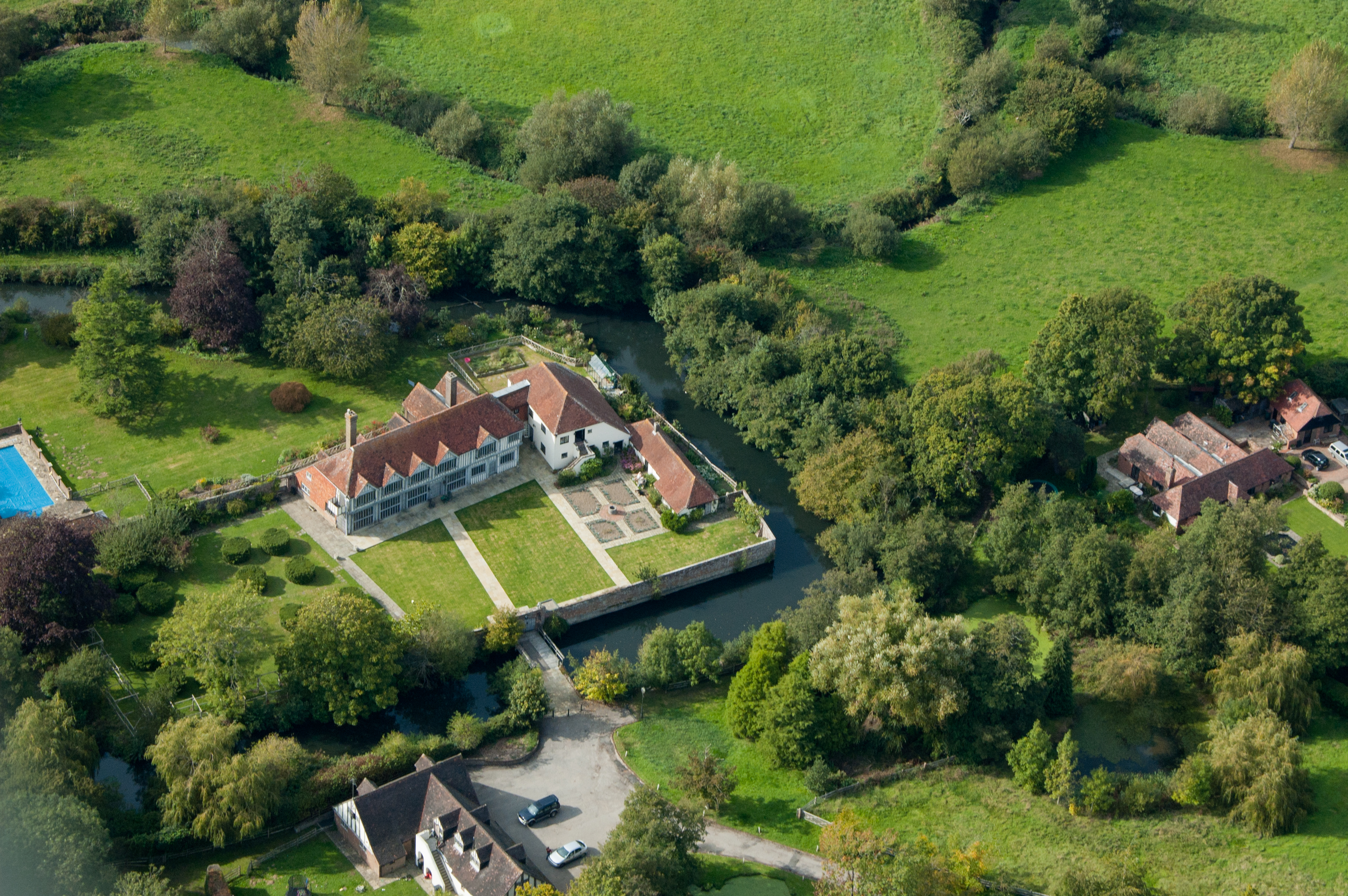
Horselunges Manor, Grant's Home in East Sussex

Marital problems, diabetes, cocaine addiction, and the death of Led Zeppelin drummer John Bonham all took their toll on Grant's health in later years. After the breakup of Led Zeppelin in 1980, and the subsequent folding of Swan Song Records in 1983, he virtually retired from the music business to his private estate, Horselunges Manor, in Hellingly, East Sussex.

However, towards the end of his life Grant conquered his addictions and lost a significant amount of weight. His first public appearance for many years was in 1989, when he and Jimmy Page attended a Frank Sinatra concert at the Royal Albert Hall. Grant subsequently sold his estate and moved to nearby Eastbourne, where he was offered the civic position of local magistrate for the town council, but turned it down. In 1992, he appeared in the film Carry On Columbus as a cardinal. In his remaining years, Grant became a keynote speaker at music management conferences such as In the City, where he was lauded by latter-day peers.

On the afternoon of 21 November 1995, Grant suffered a fatal heart attack while driving to his home at Eastbourne with his son Warren. He was 60 years old. Grant was buried on 4 December 1995 at the cemetery opposite his mansion, with the funeral service held at St. Peter and St. Paul's Church, Hailsham, East Sussex. His eulogy was read by longtime friend Alan Callan. Coincidentally, it was the 15th anniversary of Led Zeppelin's breakup. His final public appearance had been at the final night of the Page and Plant tour at the Wembley Arena in July 1995.

== Tributes and accolades ==
Grant has been widely recognised for improving pay and conditions for musicians in dealings with concert promoters. According to music journalist Mat Snow, "Peter Grant enjoys a proud position in the pantheon of legendary British rock managers." Phil Everly, from the Everly Brothers, noted: "Without his efforts, musicians had no careers. He was the first to make sure the artists came first and that we got paid and paid properly."

Chris Dreja, whom Grant had managed whilst he was with the Yardbirds, recalls:

We owe so much to that man. He changed the balance for musicians ... His vision was amazing. His dedication was with Led Zeppelin, and between them they had a very powerful tool.

Similarly, Jimmy Page has described Grant as groundbreaking in his style of management, explaining that "Peter had changed the dynamic that existed between bands, managers and promoters. He was a superb, canny manager." In 1996, the MMF (Music Managers Forum) award for outstanding achievement in management was renamed the Peter Grant Award, in his honour.

== Filmography ==
- A Night to Remember (1958) – Titanic Crew Member (uncredited)
- The Guns of Navarone (1961) – British Commando (uncredited)
- Cleopatra (1963) – Palace Guard (uncredited)
- The Song Remains the Same (1976) – Himself – Band Manager
- Carry On Columbus (1992) – Cardinal (uncredited final film role)

== Television appearances ==
- The Saint (1962)
- Crackerjack (1962)
- Dixon of Dock Green (1962)
- The Benny Hill Show (1962)
