= Heartbreaker (Led Zeppelin song) =

1969 song by Led Zeppelin

- Italian single picture sleeve

Song by Led Zeppelin

from the album Led Zeppelin II
- Released: 22 October 1969
- Recorded: 21 May 1969; July 1969
- Studio: A&R, New York
- Genre: Blues rock; hard rock
- Length: 4:15
- Label: Atlantic
- Songwriters: John Bonham; John Paul Jones; Jimmy Page; Robert Plant
- Producer: Jimmy Page

"Heartbreaker" is a song by the English rock band Led Zeppelin from their 1969 album, Led Zeppelin II. It was credited to all four members of the band, recorded at A&R Recording and Atlantic Studios in New York City during the band's second concert tour of North America, and engineered by Eddie Kramer.

== Composition ==
"Heartbreaker" has been described as an "unashamed slice of heavy rock", containing "a few very unorthodox touches". It opens the second side of Led Zeppelin II and features a distorted, "swaggering" guitar riff by Jimmy Page. The song's third verse contains three ascending changes in key. Two minutes into the track, Page performs a spontaneous, unaccompanied 46-second guitar solo that utilizes the pull-off technique. The guitar solo was supposedly influenced by the style of Johnny Guitar Watson and specifically his 1954 instrumental "Space Guitar". "Heartbreaker" was ranked number 320 in 2004 by Rolling Stone magazine, in their 500 Greatest Songs of All Time, and number 328 in 2010. Chuck Klosterman of Spin describes it as sludge metal a year ahead of Black Sabbath pioneering the genre.

== Background and recording ==
In a 1998 interview with Guitar World, Page commented that the guitar solo was recorded at Atlantic Studios in New York, as opposed to A&R Studios in New York, where the rest of the track was recorded. This gave the solo a different sound than the rest of the song. He claims to have recorded the track using a Gibson Les Paul and a Marshall Stack, adding that this was the first recorded instance of him using this combination. However, others who were present at the recording session contended that the song was recorded using a Rickenbacker amplifier, attributing the distorted tone of Page's guitar work to the disrepair of the appliance.

== Influence and legacy ==
"Heartbreaker" is one of the songs featured in Nick Hornby's book 31 Songs. Record producer Rick Rubin has remarked, "One of the greatest riffs in rock. It starts, and it's like they don't really know where the 'one' is. Magical in its awkwardness." Eddie Van Halen once claimed the "Heartbreaker" solo as the inspiration behind his adoption of the tapping technique he later popularized. In one review with Guitar World, he said: "I think I got the idea of tapping watching Jimmy Page do his "Heartbreaker" solo back in 1971. He was doing a pull-off to an open string, and I thought wait a minute, open string ... pull off. I can do that, but what if I use my finger as the nut and move it around? I just kind of took it and ran with it.

Steve Vai has also commented about it in a September 1998 Guitar World interview: "This one [Heartbreaker] had the biggest impact on me as a youth. It was defiant, bold, and edgier than hell. It really is the definitive rock guitar solo." Brett Milano of uDiscover Music rated the guitar solo as one of the 100 all-time greatest.

== Personnel ==
According to Jean-Michel Guesdon and Philippe Margotin:

- Robert Plant – vocals
- Jimmy Page – guitars
- John Paul Jones – bass
- John Bonham – drums

== See also ==
- List of cover versions of Led Zeppelin songs § Heartbreaker

== Bibliography ==
- Guesdon, Jean-Michel; Margotin, Philippe (2018). Led Zeppelin All the Songs: The Story Behind Every Track. Running Press. ISBN 978-0-316-448-67-3.
