= Led Zeppelin North American Tour Summer 1969 =

1969 concert tour by Led Zeppelin

North America Summer 1969
- Tour by Led Zeppelin
- Poster by artist Frank Bettencourt promoting Santa Barbara, California concert
- Location: United States; Canada
- Associated album: Led Zeppelin
- Start date: 5 July 1969 (scheduled to start on 4 July 1969)
- End date: 31 August 1969
- No. of shows: 46 (48 scheduled)

Led Zeppelin concert chronology
- United Kingdom Summer 1969; North America Summer 1969; Europe Autumn 1969

Led Zeppelin's Summer 1969 North American Tour was the third concert tour of North America by the English rock band. The tour commenced on 5 July and concluded on 31 August 1969.

By this point in the band's career, Led Zeppelin were earning $30,000 a night for each of the concerts they performed. According to music journalist Chris Welch:

One New York concert drew 21,000 people, while support like the Doors and Iron Butterfly were consistently blown off stage by the rampaging Britons.

This concert tour is noteworthy for the number of festival appearances made by Led Zeppelin. These include:

- 5 July – Atlanta International Pop Festival
- 6 July – Newport Jazz Festival
- 11 July – Laurel Pop Festival
- 12 July – Summer Pop Festival
- 21 July – Schaefer Music Festival – headliners at New York City's Wollman Rink, along with B.B. King
- 25 July – Midwest Rock Festival
- 27 July – Seattle Pop Festival – the infamous shark episode is alleged to have taken place at this time
- 30 August – Singer Bowl Music Festival
- 31 August – Texas International Pop Festival
- At one point, they were considered for a slot in the Woodstock Music and Art Fair from August 16 through 18, 1969.

== Tour set list ==
During the tour, Led Zeppelin usually played the same songs in the same order:

1. "Train Kept A-Rollin' "
2. "I Can't Quit You Baby"
3. "Dazed and Confused"
4. "You Shook Me"
5. "White Summer" / "Black Mountain Side"
6. "How Many More Times" – the medley portion was sometimes expanded to include "The Lemon Song" and some early rock & roll and blues numbers
7. "Communication Breakdown"

The group sometimes added:

1. "I Gotta Move" (8 August, while Page replaced a broken guitar string)
2. "What Is and What Should Never Be" (11 July & 21 August)
3. "Pat's Delight" (18 July)
4. "Your Time Is Gonna Come" (14 August)
5. "Long Tall Sally" (6 July, 12 July, & 30 August)

== Tour dates ==
Date	City	Country	Venue
~~4 July 1969~~	~~Westbury~~	United States	~~Roosevelt Raceway~~
5 July 1969	Atlanta	United States	Atlanta International Pop Festival
6 July 1969	Newport	United States	Newport Jazz Festival
11 July 1969	Laurel	United States	Laurel Pop Festival – Laurel Park Racecourse
12 July 1969	Philadelphia	United States	The Spectrum
13 July 1969	New York City	United States	Singer Bowl unscheduled, impromptu performance by Page, Plant, and Bonham with Jeff Beck Group
18 July 1969	Chicago	United States	Kinetic Playground
19 July 1969	Chicago	United States	Kinetic Playground
20 July 1969	Cleveland	United States	Musicarnival
21 July 1969	New York City	United States	Schaefer Music Festival – Wollman Rink, Central Park
25 July 1969	West Allis	United States	Midwest Rock Festival – State Fair Park
26 July 1969	Vancouver	Canada	PNE Agrodome
27 July 1969	Woodinville	United States	Seattle Pop Festival
29 July 1969	Edmonton	Canada	Kinsmen Field House
30 July 1969	Salt Lake City	United States	Terrace Ballroom
31 July 1969	Eugene	United States	University of Oregon
1 August 1969	Santa Barbara	United States	Fairgrounds Arena
2 August 1969	Albuquerque	United States	Albuquerque Civic Auditorium
3 August 1969	Houston	United States	Houston Music Hall
4 August 1969	Dallas	United States	State Fair Coliseum
7 August 1969	Las Vegas	United States	Ice Palace
8 August 1969	San Bernardino	United States	Swing Auditorium
9 August 1969	Anaheim	United States	Anaheim Convention Center
10 August 1969	San Diego	United States	San Diego Sports Arena
14 August 1969	Austin	United States	Municipal Auditorium
15 August 1969	San Antonio	United States	HemisFair Arena
16 August 1969	Asbury Park	United States	Asbury Park Convention Hall; 2 Shows
17 August 1969	Wallingford	United States	Oakdale Musical Theater
18 August 1969	Toronto	Canada	The Rockpile; 2 Shows
20 August 1969	Schenectady	United States	The Aerodrome; 2 Shows
21 August 1969	Framingham	United States	Carousel Theater
22 August 1969	Dania Beach	United States	Pirates World
23 August 1969	Dania Beach	United States	Pirates World
24 August 1969	Jacksonville	United States	Veterans Memorial Coliseum
~~25 August 1969~~	~~Monticello~~	United States	~~Delano Motor Lodge~~
27 August 1969	Hampton Beach	United States	Hampton Beach Casino Ballroom
29 August 1969	New York City	United States	Singer Bowl
30 August 1969	New York City	United States	Singer Bowl
31 August 1969	Lewisville	United States	Texas International Pop Festival

== Sources ==
- Lewis, Dan; Pallett, Simon (2005). Led Zeppelin: The Concert File. London: Omnibus Press. ISBN 1-84449-659-7.
- Welch, Chris (1994). Led Zeppelin. London: Orion Books. ISBN 978-1-85797-930-5.
