= Led Zeppelin United Kingdom Tour Summer 1969 =

1969 concert tour by Led Zeppelin

United Kingdom Summer 1969
- Tour by Led Zeppelin
- Location: England
- Associated album: Led Zeppelin
- Start date: 8 June 1969
- End date: 29 June 1969
- No. of shows: 12

Led Zeppelin concert chronology
- North America Spring 1969; United Kingdom Summer 1969; North America Summer 1969

Led Zeppelin's Summer 1969 United Kingdom Tour was a concert tour of the United Kingdom by the English rock band. The tour commenced on 8 June and concluded on 29 June 1969. It included a single show in Paris, France, performed for French television. This was the band's final ever television appearance, portions of which were later released on the Led Zeppelin DVD.

The band's tour was supported by Blodwyn Pig and The Liverpool Scene, and was promoted by the booking agency, Chrysalis.

On this tour, three of Led Zeppelin's performances were recorded and later broadcast by the British Broadcasting Corporation (BBC). The performance on 16 June was broadcast on Chris Grant's Tasty Pop Sundae, the recording on 24 June was broadcast on John Peel's Top Gear, and the 27 June show was broadcast on the Radio One In Concert series. Selected songs from all of these recordings were subsequently made available on the 1997 album BBC Sessions.

== Tour set list ==
The fairly typical set list for the tour was:

1. "The Train Kept A-Rollin' " (Bradshaw, Kay, Mann)
2. "I Can't Quit You Baby" (Dixon)
3. "Dazed and Confused" (Page)
4. "As Long As I Have You" (Mimms) (on 15 June only)
5. "Killing Floor" (Wolf) (on 15 June only)
6. "White Summer"/"Black Mountain Side" (Page)
7. "Babe I'm Gonna Leave You" (Page, Plant, Bredon) (dropped after 15 June)
8. "You Shook Me" (Dixon, Lenoir)
9. "Pat's Delight" (Page, Jones, Bonham) (dropped after 20 June)
10. "How Many More Times" (Bonham, Jones, Page)
11. "Communication Breakdown" (Bonham, Jones, Page)
12. "Long Tall Sally" (Johnson, Blackwell, Penniman) (on 29 June only)

There were some set list substitutions, variations, and order switches during the tour.

Despite having been previewed during previous Led Zeppelin concert tours, tracks from their second album were not played live on this tour. These songs included "Pat's Delight" (a.k.a. "Moby Dick)", "Whole Lotta Love", and "Killing Floor" (a.k.a. "The Lemon Song"). Instead the band concentrated solely on tracks included on their first album. Some commentators have speculated that this was a deliberate promotional surprise strategy in lieu of the release of their second album.

As some of the bootlegs (and many official documents, including the Led Zeppelin DVD) show, many of the performed songs during this tour were played in a quite different way from their studio versions. "You Shook Me" and "How Many More Times" were much extended, as was "Dazed And Confused", for which Page's bow solo was now no longer accompanied by the input of other band members. Also, the coda of "Communication Breakdown" incorporated a funky jam that included parts of "Just A Little Bit" and "It's Your Thing". Only "I Can't Quit You Baby" was played in a version closely resembling the original.

== Tour dates ==
Date	City	Country	Venue
13 June 1969	Birmingham	England	Birmingham Town Hall
15 June 1969	Manchester	England	Free Trade Hall
16 June 1969	London	England	Aeolian Hall (BBC)
19 June 1969	Paris	France	Tous En Scène, TV Show, Antenne Culturelle du Kremlin Bicetre
20 June 1969	Newcastle upon Tyne	England	Newcastle City Hall
21 June 1969	Bristol	England	Colston Hall
22 June 1969	Manchester	England	Free Trade Hall
24 June 1969	London	England	Maida Vale Studios (BBC)
26 June 1969	Portsmouth	England	Portsmouth Guildhall
27 June 1969	London	England	Playhouse Theatre (BBC)
28 June 1969	Bath	England	Bath Festival - Pavilion Recreational Ground
29 June 1969	London	England	Royal Albert Hall

== Sources ==
- Lewis, Dave and Pallett, Simon (1997) Led Zeppelin: The Concert File, London: Omnibus Press. ISBN 0-7119-5307-4.
