= Frank Bettencourt =

American poster artist

- Born: Frank G. Bettencourt; 1949; Phoenix, Arizona, U.S.
- Education: Santa Barbara City College
- Known for: Concert posters, psychedelic art, exhibition design, fine art
- Notable work: 1969 Led Zeppelin Earl Warren Showgrounds concert poster
- Movement: Psychedelic art, contemporary art
- Website: frankbettencourt-art.com

Frank Bettencourt (born 1949) is an American poster artist, fine artist, and museum exhibition designer/preparator. He is best known for his late 1960s psychedelic rock concert posters created for prominent musical acts performing at the Earl Warren Showgrounds in Santa Barbara, California—such as his 1969 Led Zeppelin poster utilized as the primary historical visual documenting the band's summer tour—as well as his civic design projects and extensive museum exhibition environments.

== Early life and education ==
Bettencourt was born in Phoenix, Arizona, in 1949 and grew up in Santa Barbara, California. He began studying art during middle school, training in fine art while simultaneously developing technical and graphic arts skills—such as model building, paste-up, layout, technical drawing, and offset printing—under the guidance of his father, a technical artist and aeronautical engineer. Prior to his higher education, Bettencourt began producing the 1960s rock concert posters that established his early professional career.

In 1969, he attended Santa Barbara City College (SBCC), where he pursued advanced fine art studies under the mentorship of contemporary artists Kenneth Nack and Robert Frame. This specialized training culminated in his work being selected by the Santa Barbara Museum of Art for their regional survey exhibitions in the early 1970s. Bettencourt's early career association with prominent Santa Barbara arts patron and gallerist Esther Bear is formally preserved in the Esther Bear Gallery records housed within the Smithsonian Institution's Archives of American Art, which catalogs his dedicated artist files from his California exhibition years.

== Career ==
=== Concert poster art and civic series ===
In the late 1960s, Bettencourt became a prominent figure in the California psychedelic art scene, primarily designing promotional materials for concert promoter Jim Salzer at the Earl Warren Showgrounds in Santa Barbara. Bettencourt managed all phases of production for his poster designs, including initial conceptual drawing and creating print-ready copy.

His 1969 concert poster for Led Zeppelin, Jethro Tull, and Fraternity of Man is cited as a definitive work of the era, appearing as plate 3.41 in Paul Grushkin's definitive historical reference book, The Art of Rock: Posters from Presley to Punk. The historical graphic has been further preserved across digital archives, serving as the main infobox visual for the Led Zeppelin North American Tour Summer 1969 article. His work from this period is characterized by intricate line work and psychedelic typography, promoting historic rock bands including Cream, Steppenwolf, Traffic, Blue Cheer, and Eric Burdon and the Animals. His graphic style from this era drew stylistic inspiration from classical artists Albrecht Dürer and Hieronymus Bosch, culminating in his final concert poster design for the supergroup Blind Faith. Original printings of his psychedelic concert art are recognized as highly collectible memorabilia of the 1960s counterculture, held in private collections and preserved in historical chronicles of rock art. His vintage works have since been preserved and sold through major fine art institutions, including multiple entries handled through Christie's Auction House as part of "The Frank Bettencourt Collection". These highly curated auctions featured his signed original poster printings for historic performances by the Yardbirds, Led Zeppelin and Jethro Tull, Blind Faith, and a multi-act bill featuring the Electric Flag, Traffic, and Steppenwolf.

His vintage posters are featured in major rock histories, including Eric Clapton: The Ultimate Illustrated History, Whole Lotta Led Zeppelin: The Illustrated History of the Heaviest Band of All Time, and Rock Graphic Originals: Revolutions in Sonic Art from Plate to Print '55 – '88. Additionally, Bettencourt's 1968 poster for the Yardbirds was selected for inclusion in the group's archival box set anthology, Glimpses 1963–1968.

In addition to his California rock concert graphics, Bettencourt expanded his design work into traditional civic celebrations in Texas following his relocation to the state in 1982. He was commissioned to design a series of annual commemorative posters for Krewe Babalu during the Mardi Gras! Galveston festivities, capturing the specific yearly themes of the carnival. During this period in the 1980s, his fine art and mixed-media works were also regularly exhibited regionally, including at the Nicodemus Galleries in Galveston.

=== International recognition and retrospectives ===
Decades later, his vintage graphic work was prominently revived in the major global graphic survey exhibition Rock Pop Underground, which toured European cultural centers including the M21 Gallery in Pécs, Hungary (2024) and the Galerie des Ateliers de Paris in France (2025). This global graphic survey was accompanied by the exhibition catalog Rock Pop Underground: Graphismes 2024.

== Municipal design and museum environments ==
=== Santa Barbara civic planning and museum tenure ===
During the 1970s and 1980s, Bettencourt contributed to municipal urban design and public arts initiatives in Santa Barbara, California and participated in preliminary regional planning discussions that helped shape the modern visual identity of the downtown core. This civic involvement included early layout concepts for pedestrian-focused paseo streetscaping, sidewalk expansions, and historical architectural landscaping preservation. In 1977, he collaborated with Paul Mills, the director of the Santa Barbara Museum of Art and a leader in the American public arts movement, on the initial layout for the civic Santa Barbara Harbor Breakwater Flag Project, which was designed to fly colorful emblems representing localized philanthropic and non-profit organizations along the harbor seawall. The public project was later permanently institutionalized through a formal municipal partnership between the City of Santa Barbara Waterfront Department and the Santa Barbara Yacht Club.

From 1977 to 1982, Bettencourt served as the chief exhibition designer and preparator for the Santa Barbara Museum of Art (SBMA). In this role, he managed the architectural layout and spatial environments for prominent temporary and traveling museum collections, including collaborating with Wright S. Ludington on the design of Ludington Court, the museum’s ancient sculpture atrium. For the 1980 presentation of The Japanese Courtier painting and calligraphy exhibition from the Fogg Art Museum, he engineered false gallery walls to structurally integrate existing heavy sculptures within limited hall spaces. That same year, he managed the complex spatial engineering for the five-gallery installation of Seven Decades of Twentieth-Century Art from the Sidney and Harriet Janis Collection during its final nationwide tour stop before entering the permanent custody of the Museum of Modern Art (MoMA). His technical installations also included developing structural weight-bearing frameworks and specialized climate-sensitive mounting systems for 18th-century master textiles in the international traveling exhibition Real Fábrica de Tapices, as well as fabricating period-accurate entrance architecture for the historical children's illustration survey Enchanted Images.

Bettencourt's technical layout and drafting work also intersected with the museum's major publishing projects. In 1979, he drafted the architectural gallery floor plans used to orchestrate the museum's landmark contemporary photography survey exhibition, Attitudes: Photography in the 1970s, curated by Fred R. Parker. The precise architectural schematic was subsequently utilized by Parker as the primary graphic design cover for the accompanying spiral-bound exhibition catalog published by the Santa Barbara Museum of Art, featuring his drafted layout signed with his professional initials, FGB.

=== Houston exhibition environments and technical design ===
Following his tenure in California, Bettencourt relocated to Texas in 1982, expanding his design work into major public museum environments and large-scale murals. For the Houston Museum of Natural Science, he engineered the architectural display layout for the prominent Ann and Perkins Sams gem and mineral collection, painted the institution's principal dinosaur hall mural, and designed the space mural environment for the Burke Baker Planetarium. His exhibition designs for the museum also encompassed major historical and anthropological installations, including the McDannald Hall of American Indian, alongside specialized international cultural showcases such as Angkor Wat: Khmers in Houston and Peruvian Gold: A Lost Civilization.

He subsequently operated the technical design firm Art Related Technical Services (ARTS), through which he secured specialized corporate, civic, and educational commissions. In July 1994, for the Apollo Silver Anniversary celebration, Bettencourt served as a principal exhibition designer and curator for the Spaceweek International Space Art Exhibit, hosted at Space Center Houston to commemorate the 25th anniversary of the Apollo 11 moon landing. For this milestone event, he engineered the public entrance environment, fabricated custom light sculptures, and exhibited his own space-themed paintings alongside prominent international cosmic artists. His technical production through ARTS also encompassed fabricating reconfigurable modular aerospace models for training and educational displays, such as a precision 1/100th-scale structural model of the International Space Station and multi-layered dimensional display schematics featured in regional exhibitions.

=== Fine art career ===
Following his exhibition design career, Bettencourt transitioned his primary focus to fine art painting, working with oil, acrylic, and enamel on canvas, metal, and layered acrylic. His paintings span abstract, landscape, and cosmic imagery, and are represented in permanent institutional collections, including the Art, Design & Architecture Museum at the University of California, Santa Barbara, which preserves his acrylic piece Cracker Jacks Box Design as part of the Ruth S. Schaffner Collection. Through the 1990s and 2000s, he operated as a fine art painter, exhibiting regionally across the American Southwest before participating in international survey exhibitions in the 2020s. Notably, an impressionistic triptych portrait of musician Barry Cowsill that Bettencourt painted in 1980 was later selected as an artwork insert for Cowsill’s posthumous archival album release, US 1.

== Permanent collections ==
Bettencourt's fine art works are represented in permanent institutional collections, including:

- Art, Design & Architecture Museum, University of California, Santa Barbara, Santa Barbara, California (Cracker Jacks Box Design, acrylic on canvas, gifted as part of the Ruth S. Schaffner Collection)

== Selected exhibitions ==
=== Selected solo exhibitions ===
- 1969: Santa Barbara City College, Santa Barbara, California
- 1970: Santa Barbara City College, Santa Barbara, California
- 1974: New Work/New Talent, Los Angeles County Museum of Art (LACMA), Los Angeles, California
- 1975: Esther Bear Gallery Group Exhibition, Esther Bear Gallery, Montecito, California
- 1977: Anapamu Art Gallery, Santa Barbara, California
- 1978: Harlan Gallery, Tucson, Arizona
- 1981: Meredith Niles Gallery, Santa Barbara, California
- 1983: Westmont College, Montecito, California
- 1984: Nicodemus Galleries Regional Survey, Nicodemus Galleries, Galveston, Texas
- 1992: Jan Garber Gallery, Seabrook, Texas
- 1993: Nova Space Art Gallery, Houston, Texas
- 1994: Accent Gallery, Houston, Texas
- 1994: Light Sculptures, Space Center Houston, Houston, Texas
- 1996: Clear Lake Gallery, Houston, Texas
- 1998: West End Gallery, Silver City, New Mexico
- 2001: Bradford Street Gallery, Houston, Texas

=== Selected group exhibitions ===
- 1971: New Painting: Santa Barbara, Santa Barbara Museum of Art, Santa Barbara, California
- 1975: New Work/New Talent Invitational Exhibit, Los Angeles County Museum of Art (LACMA), Los Angeles, California
- 1975: Santa Barbara Selection, Santa Barbara Museum of Art, Santa Barbara, California
- 1976: 20th Century Drawing Invitational Exhibit, Los Angeles County Museum of Art (LACMA), Los Angeles, California
- 1979: Santa Barbara Artists' Invitational: Part I, Santa Barbara Museum of Art, Santa Barbara, California
- 1979: Santa Barbara Artists' Invitational: Part II, Santa Barbara Museum of Art, Santa Barbara, California
- 1979: Santa Barbara Arts Festival, Santa Barbara Museum of Natural History, Santa Barbara, California
- 1982: Esther Bear Collection: 25 Years of Collecting, Santa Barbara City College, Santa Barbara, California
- 1983: Santa Barbara Arts Festival, Santa Barbara Museum of Natural History, Santa Barbara, California
- 1986: Nicodemus Gallery, Galveston, Texas
- 1989: The Art of the Poster, 1889–1989, Santa Barbara Museum of Art, Santa Barbara, California
- 1994: Spaceweek International Space Art Exhibit, Space Center Houston, Johnson Space Center, Houston, Texas
- 1995: Bayside Gallery, Kemah, Texas
- 1999: Gifts of Nature Gallery, Houston, Texas
- 2000: Silver Winds Gallery, Los Pinos, New Mexico
- 2003: Hiro Yamagata & NASA Invitational Exhibit, Yokohama, Japan
- 2024: Rock Pop Underground, M21 Gallery, Pécs, Hungary
- 2025: Bozeman Art Museum, Bozeman, Montana
- 2025: Rock Pop Underground Book Presentation, Galerie des Ateliers de Paris, Paris, France

== Selected works ==
=== Books ===
- Bouvet, Michel; Laffitte, Fanny (2024). Rock Pop Underground: Graphismes 2024 (in French). Les Éditions du Limonaire. ISBN 979-1097737115.
- Bream, Jon (2008). Whole Lotta Led Zeppelin: The Illustrated History of the Heaviest Band of All Time. Voyageur Press. ISBN 978-0760335079.
- Golding, Peter; Miles, Barry (2018). Rock Graphic Originals: Revolutions in Sonic Art from Plate to Print '55 – '88. Thames & Hudson. ISBN 978-0500293539.
- Grushkin, Paul (2007). The Art of Rock: Posters from Presley to Punk. New York: Abbeville Press. ISBN 978-0896595842.
- Welch, Chris (2011). Dregni, Michael (ed.). Eric Clapton: The Ultimate Illustrated History. Voyageur Press. ISBN 978-0760340417.

=== Albums and archival booklets ===
- Cowsill, Barry (2009). US 1 (Archival album liner notes booklet). — Features the original painting "Portrait of Barry Cowsill 1980" by Frank Bettencourt.
- Russo, Greg; McCarty, Jim (2011). Glimpses 1963–1968 (Boxed set archival booklet). Easy Action Recordings.
