= The BBC Sessions (Small Faces album) =

Live album by Small Faces
- Released: 15 November 1999
- Recorded: 23 August 1965 – 18 April 1968
- Venue: Various
- Genres: Rock; rhythm and blues; psychedelic rock
- Length: 40:41
- Label: Strange Fruit
- Producers: Bernie Andrews, Peter Harwood

Small Faces chronology
78 in the Shade (1978)	The BBC Sessions (1999)	Live 1966 (2021)

The BBC Sessions (also known as BBC Sessions: 1965-1968) is the second live album by the British rock group Small Faces, released on 15 November 1999 on Strange Fruit Records. It is a collection of recordings the group made for the BBC. While mostly being made up of tracks recorded for Saturday Club in 1966, it also features three songs recorded for Top Gear in 1968. Accompanying these tracks are four interviews with Steve Marriott, and one featuring Kenney Jones.

== Information ==
The album was released on 15 November 1999 on Strange Fruit Records. For the US release, it was issued on Fuel 2000 the following year. Len Fico, president of Fuel 2000 states that a deal was made with the BBC and their partners on Strange Fruit Records. He stated that the project took two years to put together and that they had to track down the Small Faces in order to secure their performance rights. The album consists of fifteen songs recorded sporadically between 23 August 1965 and 18 April 1968. The first three songs feature original organist Jimmy Winston, who also sings lead vocals on "Jump Back" and "Baby Don't You Do It". The final three tracks feature P. P. Arnold on backing vocals.

The tracks recorded for Saturday Club were featured on the box set Small Faces – The Decca Years in 2015.

== Reviews ==
Professional ratings
Review scores
Source	Rating
Allmusic	4/5 stars
The Austin Chronicle	4/5 stars

In a review of the album, CMJ states that The BBC Sessions is not the place to start the Small Faces chronology, but that it presents a sidebar of their career with live recordings of both their earlier rhythm and blues and pop to their later psychedelic and hard rock-influenced material. The Austin Chronicle states that the recording is a good choice for Americans to be introduced to Small Faces music and that "although the sessions took place over a three-year period (1965-68), the band's incendiary performances lend uncommon cohesion to this compilation". They close the review with "Taken with properly enunciated intros from staid BBC announcers, these raw-yet-transcendent performances pack all the veneer of found history."

For his review, AllMusic critic Richie Unterberger states that the album tends to be heavier during the 1966 recordings than their 1968 recordings, but that is only presented on three recordings. He writes that the album feature energetic renditions of their earlier singles as well as a few first album-era songs. He states that their rendition of Willie Dixon's "You Need Loving" is an early template for Led Zeppelin's song "Whole Lotta Love". According to him, their live version of "Whatcha Gonna Do About It" "is a particularly incendiary performance" that equals to the single version. Others songs he highlighted is the Rufus Thomas original "Jump Back" and Brenda Holloway's "Every Little Bit Hurts" but that it does some tracks issued on bootleg recordings, including "You've Really Got a Hold on Me". Overall, he gave the recording 4 out of 5 stars.

== Track listing ==
All tracks written by Steve Marriott and Ronnie Lane unless noted. Note that the interviews with Marriott and Kenney Jones don't have a time stamp, but last around 1:00 in play-time.

=== CD version ===
Tracks
No.	Title	Writer(s)	Lead vocals	Length
1.	"Whatcha Gonna Do About It"	Brian Potter; Ian Samwell	Steve Marriott	2:15
2.	"Jump Back"	Rufus Thomas	Jimmy Winston	1:39
3.	"Baby Don't You Do It"	Holland-Dozier-Holland	Winston	2:25
4.	"Shake"	Sam Cooke	Ronnie Lane	3:12
5.	"Sha-La-La-La-Lee"	Kenny Lynch; Mort Shuman	Marriott	2:48
6.	"You Need Loving"	Willie Dixon	Marriott	2:34
7.	"Hey Girl"		Marriott	2:07
8.	"E Too D"		Marriott	4:11
9.	"One Night Stand"		Marriott	1:53
10.	"You'd Better Believe It"	Lynch; Jerry Ragovoy	Marriott	2:22
11.	"Understanding"		Marriott	2:32
12.	"All or Nothing"		Marriott	3:00
13.	"If I Were a Carpenter"	Tim Hardin	Marriott	2:29
14.	"Lazy Sunday"		Marriott	3:17
15.	"Every Little Bit Hurts"	Ed Cobb	Marriott	3:57
16.	"Rare Interview With Steve Marriott"		Marriott
17.	"Rare Interview With Steve Marriott"		Marriott
18.	"Rare Interview With Steve Marriott"		Marriott
19.	"Rare Interview With Steve Marriott"		Marriott
20.	"Rare Interview With Kenney Jones"		Kenney Jones
Total length:				40:41

=== Vinyl version ===
The album was issued in a gatefold format LP record in 2001 by Strange Fruit under the catalogue number SFRSLP087. All tracks written by Steve Marriott and Ronnie Lane unless noted. Note that the interviews with Marriott and Kenney Jones don't have a time stamp, but last around 1:00 in play-time.

Side one
No.	Title	Writer(s)	Lead vocals	Length
1.	"Whatcha Gonna Do About It"	Brian Potter; Ian Samwell	Steve Marriott	2:15
2.	"Jump Back"	Rufus Thomas	Jimmy Winston	1:39
3.	"Baby Don't You Do It"	Holland-Dozier-Holland	Winston	2:25
4.	"Shake"	Sam Cooke	Ronnie Lane	3:12
5.	"Sha-La-La-La-Lee"	Kenny Lynch; Mort Shuman	Marriott	2:48
6.	"You Need Loving"	Willie Dixon	Marriott	2:34
7.	"Hey Girl"		Marriott	2:07
8.	"E Too D"		Marriott	4:11
9.	"One Night Stand"		Marriott	1:53
Total length:				23:04

Side two
No.	Title	Writer(s)	Lead vocals	Length
1.	"You'd Better Believe It"	Lynch; Jerry Ragovoy	Marriott	2:22
2.	"Understanding"		Marriott	2:32
3.	"All or Nothing"		Marriott	3:00
4.	"If I Were a Carpenter"	Tim Hardin	Marriott	2:29
5.	"Lazy Sunday"		Marriott	3:17
6.	"Every Little Bit Hurts"	Ed Cobb	Marriott	3:57
7.	"Rare Interview With Steve Marriott"		Marriott
8.	"Rare Interview With Steve Marriott"		Marriott
9.	"Rare Interview With Steve Marriott"		Marriott
10.	"Rare Interview With Steve Marriott"		Marriott
11.	"Rare Interview With Kenney Jones"		Kenney Jones
Total length:				17:37

== Recording details ==
Session details from Small Faces – The Decca Years.

Tracks 1, 2, 3 and 16 recorded 23 August 1965

- Broadcast on Saturday Club, 4 September 1965.
  - Produced by Peter Harwood

Tracks 4, 5, 6 and 17 recorded 14 March 1966

- Broadcast on Saturday Club, 19 March 1966.
  - Produced by Peter Harwood

Tracks 7, 8, 9 and 18 recorded 3 May 1966

- Broadcast on Saturday Club, 7 May 1966.
  - Produced by Peter Harwood

Tracks 10, 11, 12 and 19 recorded 30 June 1966

- Broadcast on Saturday Club, 2 July 1966.
  - Produced by Peter Harwood

Tracks 13, 14, 15 and 20 recorded 14 April 1968

- Broadcast on Top Gear, 20 April 1968
  - Produced by Bernie Andrews

== Personnel ==
Small Faces

- Steve Marriott – guitar, piano on "Every Little Bit Hurts" lead vocals (1, 5–19), backing vocals (2–4)
- Ronnie Lane – bass guitar, lead vocals on "Shake", backing vocals (1–3, 5–15)
- Kenney Jones – drums, lead vocals on 'Rare Interview with Kenney Jones'
- Ian McLagan – keyboards (4–15), backing vocals (4–15)

with:

- Jimmy Winston – keyboards (1–3), lead vocals (2–3), backing vocals on 'Whatcha Gonna Do About It'
- P. P. Arnold – backing vocals (13, 15)

Technical

- Peter Harwood – producer (1–12, 16, 17, 18, 19)
- Bernie Andrews – producer (13–15, 20)
- Bill Bebb – engineer (1–12, 16, 17, 18, 19)
- Allen Harris – engineer (13–15, 20)
- Dave Tate – engineer (13–15, 20)
