= Live 1966 =

Live album by Small Faces
- Released: 4 June 2021
- Recorded: 9 January 1966
- Venues: Twenty Club, Mouscron, Belgium
- Length: 55:21
- Label: Nice
- Producer: Nick Robbins

Small Faces chronology
The BBC Sessions (1999)	Live 1966 (2021)

Live 1966 is a live album by British rock group Small Faces, initially released on 4 June 2021, becoming the first release on drummer Kenney Jones' Nice Records. The album is a remastered soundboard recording of Small Faces 9 January 1966 performance at the Twenty Club in Mouscron, Belgium.

The material on the album was initially released with a book called Smalls in 2017. However, as Jones wanted to minimize bootlegging he started Nice Records and acquired the original tapes from the performance. Presented here are several recordings the group never recorded in studios. It received primarily positive reviews upon release.

== Background ==
Live recordings by Small Faces have always been a rarity, simply because most of their live appearances weren't recorded. Notable exceptions include their appearance on West Germany television show Beat Beat Beat, where they perform four songs, along with In Memoriam or The Autumn Stone, which features five live tracks recorded at Newcastle City Hall. Besides one BBC session recorded in August 1965, no other live recordings of the Small Faces in 1965 or 1966 have ever surfaced or been recorded, making the Twenty Club performance the earliest.

The recording of Small Faces performing at the Twenty Club initially came from a compact disc included in a book called Smalls. This book was only released in French and was written by Jean-Noël Coghe, who followed Small Faces on tour in Belgium, documenting the entire trip in the book. Eventually, he arranged for a soundboard recording at the Twenty Club on 9 January 1966 without the knowledge or consent from Small Faces. Although these were previously unissued tracks, they remained in obscurity due to the fact that the book was only released in France.

== Release ==
Eventually, Small Faces' drummer Kenney Jones got his hands on the recording, much to his satisfaction. He did this in large part due to secure control over the recordings, stating that "It’s great to launch Nice Records and to be able to take back control of the Small Faces products and recordings", following bootlegging of Small Faces material. The tapes were largely remastered and restored by Tosh Flood and Nick Robbins, both of whom have previously worked on material by the group. Jones has stated that "I have assembled a first-class team who understand the importance of the Small Faces' legacy." The sound quality on the original Smalls CD was in much worse shape than the Live 1966 recordings will be, this is due to the fact that the author of Smalls wanted to leave it "as authentic as possible".

Live 1966 was initially released as a digital download release on 4 June 2021, while physical copies weren't released until almost three months later, when the CD version of the album was issued on 3 September. A Double LP will be released on 5 November 2021. This release is set to be pressed on coloured vinyl along with Kenney Jones interviews in the liner notes. With the CD release, Nice Records started distributing physical albums for the first time, with Jones stating "We want to do this properly. There is still previously unreleased material locked away in archives because record companies can’t - or won’t - release it, as well as material that labels lost or never got from the artist in the first place.". Live 1966 will become the first in a series of rare or previously unreleased recordings issue on Nice Records, as unreleased and newly recorded Faces songs will be released soon.

== Reception ==
Kenney Jones has implied on multiple occasions that he enjoyed playing with Small Faces during this time, which he thinks this album captures well: "We were a great live act then and even though we started to have hits, our live act was never the same again. This gig is really what the Small Faces were all about" In a review for Making Time, the reviewer praises the sound quality, stating that it gives a very clear sound which helps bring out the clarity and quality of these live recordings, calling Small Faces "insightful" and saying that the sound quality immerses the listener into a "small club with everyone drenched in sweat" They call it a gem and an "amazing find" and finds the live versions of "E Too D" and "Come On Children" better than the studio versions released on the Small Faces debut album in 1966. The review ends by praising Small Faces, placing them over any live recordings the Beatles possibly could do.

== Track listing ==
Side one (Early show)
No.	Title	Writer(s)	Lead vocals	Length
1.	"Ooh Poo Pah Doo"	Jessie Hill	Ronnie Lane	1:56
2.	"You Need Loving"	Willie Dixon	Steve Marriott	4:49
3.	"Plum Nellie" / "Baby, Please Don't Go" / "Parchman Farm Blues" / "In the Midnight Hour" / "Work Song" / "Land Of 1000 Dances" (Medley)	Steve Cropper; Al Jackson Jr.; Booker T. Jones; Lewie Steinberg; Bukka White; Wilson Pickett; Oscar Brown; Chris Kenner	instrumental / Marriott	8:55
Total length:				15:40

Side two (Early show)
No.	Title	Writer(s)	Lead vocals	Length
1.	"Whatcha Gonna Do About It"	Brian Potter; Ian Samwell	Marriott	2:14
2.	"Comin' Home Baby"	Bob Dorough; Ben Tucker	instrumental	2:38
3.	"E Too D"	Steve Marriott; Ronnie Lane	Marriott	5:29
Total length:				10:21

Side three (Late show)
No.	Title	Writer(s)	Lead vocals	Length
1.	"Come On Children"	Marriott; Lane; Kenney Jones; Jimmy Winston	Marriott	4:23
2.	"Grow Your Own" / "Everything's Gonna Be Alright" / "Shake And Fingerpop" (Medley)	Marriott; Lane; Jones; Ian McLagan; Little Walter; Autry DeWalt; Lawrence Horn; Willie Woods	instrumental / Marriott	4:55
3.	"Please, Please, Please"	James Brown; Johnny Terry	Marriott	4:18
4.	"Strange"	Larry Williams	Marriott	3:36
Total length:				17:12

Side four (Late show)
No.	Title	Writer(s)	Lead vocals	Length
1.	"You Need Loving"	Dixon	Marriott	4:35
2.	"Comin' Home Baby"	Dorough; Tucker	instrumental	2:53
3.	"E Too D"	Marriott; Lane	Marriott	2:26
4.	"Whatcha Gonna Do About It"	Potter; Samwell	Marriott	2:14
Total length:				12:08

== Personnel ==
- Steve Marriott – lead vocals, rhythm and lead guitar
- Ronnie Lane – bass guitar, lead and backing vocals
- Ian McLagan – Hammond organ, backing vocals
- Kenney Jones – drums
