= Aerodrom =

Aerodrom may refer to:

== Places ==
- Aerodrom Municipality, Skopje, a municipality of the city of Skopje, North Macedonia
  - Aerodrom, Skopje, a neighbourhood of Skopje, and seat of the municipality
- Aerodrom, Kragujevac, a former city municipality of the city of Kragujevac, Serbia

== Other uses ==
- Aerodrom (band), a Yugoslav, now Croatian rock band from Zagreb

== See also ==
- Aerodrome (disambiguation)
