= You Shook Me =

1962 single by Muddy Waters

- 1963 UK EP picture sleeve

Single by Muddy Waters
- B-side: "Muddy Waters Twist"
- Released: June 30, 1962
- Recorded: Chicago, May 3, 1961 (backing track); June 27, 1962 (vocal overdub)
- Genre: Blues
- Length: 2:42
- Label: Chess
- Songwriters: Willie Dixon; J. B. Lenoir (Note: On the original Chess singles, only Willie Dixon is listed as the songwriter)
- Producers: Leonard Chess; Phil Chess

Muddy Waters singles chronology
"Going Home" (1962)	"You Shook Me" (1962)	"You Need Love" (1963)

"You Shook Me" is a 1962 blues song recorded by Chicago blues artist Muddy Waters. Willie Dixon wrote the lyrics and Earl Hooker provided the instrumental backing; the song features Waters' vocal in unison with Hooker's slide-guitar melody. "You Shook Me" became one of Muddy Waters' most successful early-1960s singles and has been interpreted by several blues and rock artists.

== Background ==
"You Shook Me" is unique among Muddy Waters' songs – it is the first time he overdubbed vocals onto an existing commercially released record. The backing track for Waters started as an impromptu slide guitar instrumental by blues guitarist Earl Hooker during a May 3, 1961, recording session for Chief Records. To start the session, Hooker and his backup band played a "warm-up" number, loosely fashioned on earlier Hooker songs and a rhythmic element from the blues standard "Rock Me Baby". One take was recorded, apparently unknown to Hooker. A.C. Reed, who played tenor saxophone on the recording, recalled:

We was just warmin' up, you know, we wasn't even gonna cut that tune, and Hooker just started out on it. Mel London ... just cut the warm-up tape, it sound so good [and then] he put it out ... Hooker was just somebody like you gave to catch him at his best, you know, unpredictable.

Chief owner and producer Mel London chose "Blue Guitar" for the title and issued it as a single on the Chief subsidiary, Age Records, in 1962. Hooker is listed as the artist and writer and backing him on slide guitar were Reed and Ernest Cotton on tenor saxophones, Johnny "Big Moose" Walker on organ, Ernest Johnson on electric bass, and Bobby Little on drums. (Note: The 1989 Muddy Waters Chess box set lists Dixon on double bass and Casey Jones on drums instead of Johnson and Little; The Complete Muddy Waters Discography shows Dixon on bass, only Reed on sax, and adds Lafayette Leake on piano; AllMusic lists Otis Spann on piano instead of Leake.)

Hooker biographer Sebastian Danchin cites "Blue Guitar" as Hooker's favorite piece "as it combines the ultimate in taste, virtuosity, sheer simplicity, and pure creativity." He notes the influence of blues slide guitarist Robert Nighthawk and Hooker's "accuracy" and "impeccable phrasing". The single became popular in Chicago and sold well for a blues instrumental. Many Chicago-area blues musicians added "Blue Guitar" to their sets and it took a place alongside other popularly performed instrumentals, such as Bill Doggett's "Honky Tonk" and Freddie King's "Hide Away".

== Muddy Waters song ==
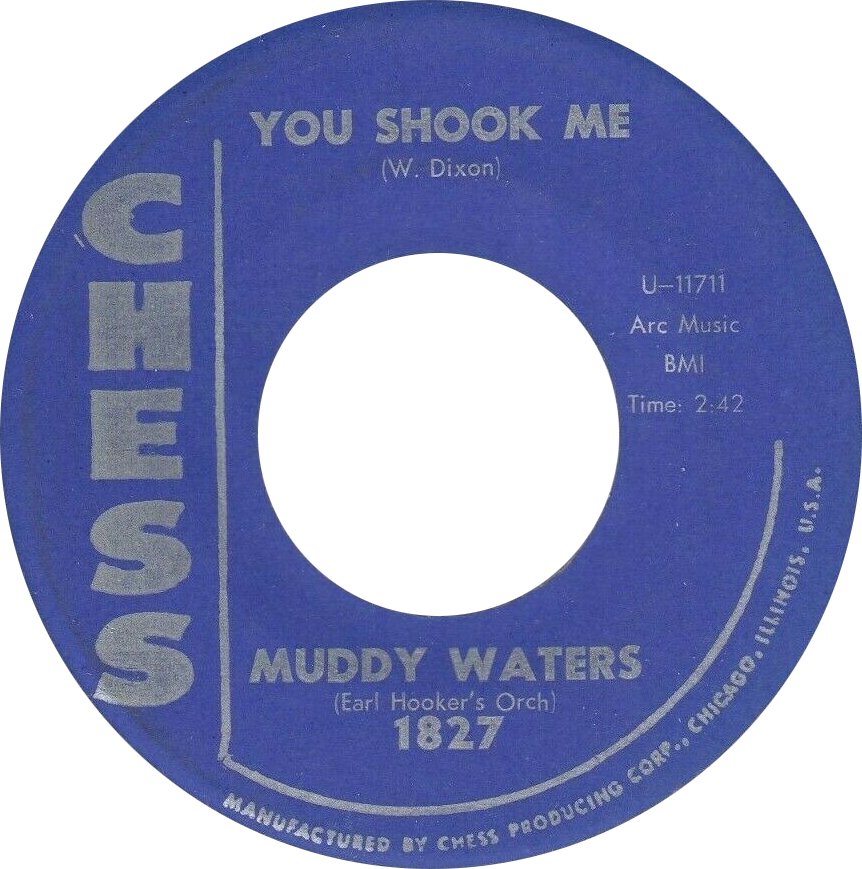
Side-A label of the US single

Chess Records owner and producer Leonard Chess heard "Blue Guitar" and sensed greater potential for the song. Searching for material for his label's artist, Muddy Waters, he approached London about using Hooker's instrumental. A deal was struck and Chess arranger and songwriter Willie Dixon wrote lyrics for the song. The lyrics are also credited to Chess blues artist J. B. Lenoir; other than being listed as a writer, there is no information about his involvement and Lenoir never recorded the song. The lyrics have been compared to other songs Dixon wrote for Chicago blues artists, such as "I Can't Quit You Baby" for Otis Rush and "Mad Love" for Waters. However, "You Shook Me" also conveys the consequences of a married man's extramarital affairs and reflects the common blues theme, "you reap what you sow":

You know you shook me, baby, you shook me all night long (2×)
Oh, you know you kept on shakin' me darlin', 'til you done messed up my happy home

Rather than re-recording the song with new musicians, on June 27, 1962, Waters overdubbed a vocal track to Hooker's 1961 recording to create "You Shook Me". The song, using the arrangement from "Blue Guitar", is a moderately-slow tempo twelve-bar blues, notated in 12/8 time in the key of D. For the melody line, Muddy Waters doubled Hooker's prominent slide-guitar line, giving the song its distinctive hook. Despite its artificiality, Waters biographer Robert Gordon noted that the song "worked surprisingly well due in large part to the musicians' shared background [both being from the Mississippi Delta area]".

"You Shook Me" was relatively successful, but did not reach the national record charts. However, it was popular enough for Leonard Chess to try to repeat; in October 1962, he had Muddy Waters overdub three more Earl Hooker instrumentals with lyrics by Dixon. One of these, "You Need Love" (see "Whole Lotta Love" section on Similarities to "You Need Love"), was also successful and outsold other Waters singles during the early 1960s.

In the UK, Pye Records released these Muddy Waters/Earl Hooker songs on a four-song extended play 45 rpm record in 1963. Reportedly, this EP was a favorite of then-teenagers Jeff Beck and Jimmy Page. According to music impresario Giorgio Gomelsky, he arranged a meeting where Dixon (along with Howlin' Wolf and Sonny Boy Williamson II) introduced unreleased recordings of several songs, including "You Shook Me" and "Little Red Rooster", to Eric Clapton, Page, Brian Jones, John Mayall, and others; Dixon recalled giving out "lots of tapes [of songs] when I was over there", which were later recorded by the Yardbirds and the Rolling Stones.

== Jeff Beck Group recording ==
"You Shook Me"

Song by The Jeff Beck Group

from the album Truth
- Released: July 29, 1968
- Genre: Hard rock
- Length: 2:33
- Label: EMI Columbia (UK), Epic (US)
- Songwriters: Willie Dixon and J. B. Lenoir
- Producer: Mickie Most

English guitarist Jeff Beck recorded "You Shook Me" with the first Jeff Beck Group during sessions for the Truth album in May 1968. Beck's hard rock treatment made the song a highlight of their live performances. Beck biographer Martin Power notes the appeal of the "dynamic interplay between Jeff's guitar and Rod's [Stewart's] voice". Beck utilized fuzz-box and wah-wah pedal guitar effects for his extensive fills around Stewart's vocals as well as his solo. The song concludes with guitar-amplifier feedback, which Beck described in the Truth liner notes: "Last note of song is my guitar being sick – well so would you if I smashed your guts for 2:28". Power adds, "Jeff's solo at the end of 'You Shook Me' indeed lived up to his claim, vomiting all over Rod's shoes at the conclusion."

For the recording, studio session musician John Paul Jones (who played bass on "Beck's Bolero" and the Yardbirds' "Happenings Ten Years Time Ago") contributed an organ part, which he would do later for Led Zeppelin's version. Although Columbia distributed a promotional 45 rpm "demonstration record" of "You Shook Me", a single was not released to the general public. The song is included on Truth and several Jeff Beck compilations.

== Led Zeppelin version ==
"You Shook Me"

Song by Led Zeppelin

from the album Led Zeppelin
- Released: January 12, 1969
- Recorded: September 27, 1968
- Studio: Olympic, London
- Genre: Blues rock • psychedelic blues • psychedelic rock
- Length: 6:30
- Label: Atlantic
- Songwriters: Willie Dixon; J. B. Lenoir (Note: Lenoir's name usually does not appear on Led Zeppelin releases)
- Producer: Jimmy Page

English rock band Led Zeppelin recorded "You Shook Me" for their 1969 debut album Led Zeppelin. AllMusic critic Bill Janovitz describes it as "a heavy, pummeling bit of post-psychedelic blues-rock, with healthy doses of vocal histrionics from Robert Plant and guitar fireworks from Jimmy Page". At nearly six and a half minutes, it is considerably longer than the Muddy Waters or Jeff Beck recordings. Except for the breaks during the song's guitar solo, Led Zeppelin uses a straightforward twelve-bar blues arrangement, but performed at a slower tempo.

During the opening and closing vocal sections, Page takes Earl Hooker's slide-guitar lines and stretches them out using liberal amounts of guitar effects, with Robert Plant's vocal matching them note for note. Plant uses Willie Dixon's opening verses, but also incorporates some from Robert Johnson's "Stones in My Passway": "I have a bird that whistles and I have birds that sings". The instrumental part consists of three twelve-bar sections for solos by John Paul Jones on organ, Plant on harmonica, and Page on guitar. Led Zeppelin biographer Keith Shadwick notes that, while the accompaniment may appear casual, it is "very tightly arranged, even down to [drummer John] Bonham's strict limitation of his cymbals to a ride splash in each bar and hi-hat beats in unison with his bass-drum pedal". Through the use of overdubs, Jones plays organ (using the pedals for bass) and electric piano.

Led Zeppelin regularly performed "You Shook Me" during their concert tours until October 1969, and occasionally thereafter when the group began to incorporate more material from subsequent albums into their on-stage performances. Two versions from 1969 are included on their BBC Sessions album. The 2003 Led Zeppelin DVD has a 1970 performance from the Royal Albert Hall as part of a medley during "How Many More Times". Jimmy Page performed the song on his tour with the Black Crowes in 1999, a version of which is on the album Live at the Greek.

=== Reception ===
In a retrospective review of Led Zeppelin (Deluxe Edition), Sheldon Pearce of Consequence of Sound praised the song, calling it a "masterpiece" with Plant's vocals and a "slow-strutting tempo". Pearce wrote that Plant "croons like he's plunging down a rabbit hole". Pearce further wrote that the song "ends so abruptly you have little time to digest what just hit you".

=== Disagreement over influence ===
Since their version was released nine months after Beck's and the two have similarities, Led Zeppelin have been accused of stealing Beck's idea. Page chalks it up to coincidence, citing his and Beck's similar background and tastes, and denied hearing Beck's version. Page in 1977 elaborated:

[Beck] had the same sort of taste in music as I did. That's why you'll find on the early LPs we both did a song like "You Shook Me." It was the type of thing we'd both played in bands. Someone told me he'd already recorded it after we'd already put it down on the first Zeppelin album. I thought, "Oh dear, it's going to be identical," but it was nothing like it, fortunately. I just had no idea he'd done it. It was on Truth but I first heard it when I was in Miami after we'd recorded our version. It's a classic example of coming from the same area musically, of having a similar taste.

Later, he added: "When he [John Paul Jones] did ours, he didn't say anything about it ... He probably didn't know it was the same number because the two versions were so different."

However, Beck biographer Annette Carson notes "during a 1976 interview with NME's Billy Altman, Beck attested to [the fact that Page had accompanied Peter Grant to several Jeff Beck Group gigs when they first played America], stating that '[Jimmy] was going with us from city to city, taking things in'. Rod Stewart made a similar claim about Page on a US radio show during the eighties". Carson adds, "Both Beck and Stewart had vivid memories of Jimmy Page traveling around with their U.S. tour that summer, when he'd obviously listened to all their material".

Led Zeppelin biographer Mick Wall also points out in When Giants Walked the Earth: A Biography of Led Zeppelin that "Peter Grant had given him [Jimmy Page] an advance copy of Truth weeks before its release" and "it seems inconceivable that John Paul Jones would not have mentioned at some point that he had actually played Hammond organ on the Truth version". Major differences between the two versions include the prominence afforded Nicky Hopkins keyboard playing in the Mickie Most mix, and that Stewart sings only two verses in the Jeff Beck recording.

=== Personnel ===
According to Jean-Michel Guesdon and Philippe Margotin:

- Robert Plant – vocals, harmonica
- Jimmy Page – guitars
- John Paul Jones – bass, organ, electric piano
- John Bohnam – drums

== See also ==
- List of Led Zeppelin songs written or inspired by others

== Notes ==
Footnotes

Citations

References

- Akkerman, Gregg (2014). Experiencing Led Zeppelin: A Listener's Companion. Rowman & Littlefield. ISBN 978-0810889163.
- Beck, Jeff (1968). Truth (Album liner notes). Jeff Beck Group. Columbia Records. SCX 6293.
- Carson, Annette (2001). Jeff Beck: Crazy Fingers. Backbeat Books. ISBN 0-87930-632-7.
- Chess (1989). Muddy Waters: Chess Box (Box set booklet). Muddy Waters. Chess/MCA Records. OCLC 154264537. CHD3-80002.
- Danchin, Sebastian (2001). Earl Hooker: Blues Master. University Press of Mississippi. ISBN 1-57806-306-X.
- Dixon, Willie; Snowden, Don (1989). I Am the Blues. Da Capo Press. ISBN 0-306-80415-8.
- Gordon, Robert (2002). Can't Be Satisfied: The Life and Times of Muddy Waters (1st. ed.). Little, Brown. ISBN 0-316-32849-9.
- Guesdon, Jean-Michel; Margotin, Philippe (2018). Led Zeppelin All the Songs: The Story Behind Every Track. Running Press. ISBN 978-0-316-448-67-3.
- The Blues. Hal Leonard Corporation. 2005. pp. 249–251. ISBN 0-79355-259-1.
- Inaba, Mitsutoshi (2011). Willie Dixon: Preacher of the Blues. Scarecrow Press. ISBN 978-0-8108-6993-6.
- Power, Martin (2011). Hot Wired Guitar: The Life of Jeff Beck. Omnibus Press. ISBN 978-1-84938-869-6.
- Shadwick, Keith (2005). Led Zeppelin: The Story of a Band and Their Music 1968–1980 (1st. ed.). Backbeat Books. ISBN 978-0-87930-871-1.
- Wall, Mick (2010). When Giants Walked the Earth: A Biography of Led Zeppelin. St. Martin's Griffin. ISBN 978-0-312-59039-0.
- Wight, Phil; Rothwell, Fred (1991). "The Complete Muddy Waters Discography". Blues & Rhythm (200).
