= Un Bien =

Caribbean restaurant in Seattle, Washington, U.S.

Restaurant information
- Location: Seattle, Washington, United States

Un Bien is a Caribbean restaurant with three locations in Seattle, in the U.S. state of Washington.

The first Ballard restaurant was opened on June 3, 2015, by Julian and Lucas Lorenzo, the sons of original Paseo owner Lorenzo Lorenzo, who had closed the restaurant and declared bankruptcy following allegations of wage theft and racial discrimination. At the time, Paseo cited "unfortunate circumstances" but claimed that the closure was unrelated to the allegations or related lawsuit. A second location opened in 2016 at the site of a former Paseo branch facing Shilshole Bay in western Ballard. In 2016, Un Bien was rated by Yelp as the best restaurant in Washington through an algorithm that takes user-generated reviews and ratings into account.

Aimee Rizzo of The Infatuation described the restaurant as a "fuchsia and teal shack on the side of the road". The Caribbean roast pork sandwich is a Macrina baguette with braised pork, marinade, sweet onions, pickled jalapeño, romaine, and aioli. The menu has also included grilled chicken and roasted corn with aioli, paprika, and parmesan. Rizzo included the business in The Infatuation's 2022 list of the Seattle's 25 best restaurants.
