= El Paseo =

El Paseo may refer to:

- El Paseo (Palm Desert, California), city
- El Paseo (Santa Barbara, California), complex of historic buildings in downtown Santa Barbara
- El Paseo (film), a 2010 Colombian comedy film
- El Paseo Building, a two-story Spanish Eclectic building in Carmel-by-the-Sea, California
- El Paseo (restaurant), a defunct restaurant in Mill Valley, California.
- El Paseo (painting), an 1854 painting by John Phillip
- El Paseo, a sculpture by Jo Mora

== See also ==
- Paseo (disambiguation)
