= Paseo =

Paseo may refer to:

- a paseo, a promenade, esplanade or public avenue.
- Paseo, a euphemism for a ride to summary execution during the White Terror during the Spanish Civil War

== Parkways and malls ==
- The Paseo (Kansas City, Missouri), a parkway in Kansas City, Missouri, U.S.
- The Paseo (Pasadena), an outdoor mall in Pasadena, California, U.S.
- Paseo Arts District, a commercial shopping district in Oklahoma City, U.S.
- Paseo de la Reforma, wide avenue that runs diagonally across the heart of Mexico City
- Paseo de Roxas, prime commercial artery in the Makati Central Business District of Metro Manila

== Entertainment ==
- Paseo (film), a 2018 Canadian short film
- "Paseo", a song by Paradisio from Paradisio

== Other ==
- Toyota Paseo, a subcompact car
- Paseo (restaurant), a restaurant in Seattle, Washington

== See also ==
- El Paseo (disambiguation)
