= BBC Sessions (Led Zeppelin album) =

Live album by Led Zeppelin
- Released: 17 November 1997
- Recorded: March & June 1969, 1 April 1971, London, England, UK
- Genres: Hard rock; heavy metal; blues rock
- Length: 149:23; 197:37 (2016 reissue)
- Label: Atlantic
- Producer: Jimmy Page
- Compiler: Jimmy Page

Led Zeppelin chronology
The Complete Studio Recordings (1993)	BBC Sessions (1997)	The Best of Led Zeppelin (1999/2000)

Led Zeppelin chronology
Led Zeppelin Deluxe Edition (2014–2015)	The Complete BBC Sessions (2016)	Live E.P. (2025)

BBC Sessions is a compilation album featuring studio sessions and a live concert recorded by the English rock group Led Zeppelin for the BBC. It was released on 17 November 1997, by Atlantic Records. Disc one consists of material from four different 1969 BBC sessions. Disc two contains most of the 1 April 1971 concert from the Paris Theatre in London. Disc three was only included in a limited run of album releases and features rare interviews from 1969, 1976/1977, and 1990.

Countless bootlegs of these recordings circulated for years before the official release. This release was widely welcomed by Led Zeppelin fans as it was the first live release since The Song Remains the Same in 1976. Others have criticized the decision to edit some of the songs and drop others that were recorded for the BBC. Most notable are one session from 1969 which included the unreleased song "Sunshine Woman", and about seven minutes of the "Whole Lotta Love" medley from 1971. The album was re-released in September 2016 as The Complete BBC Sessions with further BBC recordings, including the "Sunshine Woman" session.

Professional ratings
Review scores
Source	Rating
AllMusic	4.5/5 stars
Blender	4/5 stars
Robert Christgau	(neither)
The Encyclopedia of Popular Music	4/5 stars
NME	6/10 stars
Pitchfork	8.9/10
Uncut	4/5 stars

== Track listing ==
=== Standard edition ===
Disc one
No.	Title	Writer(s)	Length
1.	"You Shook Me"	Willie Dixon, J. B. Lenoir	5:14
2.	"I Can't Quit You Baby"	Dixon	4:22
3.	"Communication Breakdown"	John Bonham, John Paul Jones, Jimmy Page	3:12
4.	"Dazed and Confused"	Page, inspired by Jake Holmes	6:39
5.	"The Girl I Love She Got Long Black Wavy Hair"	Bonham, Dixon, Sleepy John Estes, Robert Johnson, Jones, Page, Robert Plant	3:00
6.	"What Is and What Should Never Be"	Page, Plant	4:20
7.	"Communication Breakdown"	Bonham, Jones, Page	2:40
8.	"Travelling Riverside Blues"	Johnson, Page, Plant	5:12
9.	"Whole Lotta Love"	Bonham, Dixon, Jones, Page, Plant	6:09
10.	"Somethin' Else"	Eddie Cochran, Sharon Sheeley	2:06
11.	"Communication Breakdown"	Bonham, Jones, Page	3:05
12.	"I Can't Quit You Baby"	Dixon	6:21
13.	"You Shook Me"	Dixon, Lenoir	10:19
14.	"How Many More Times"	Bonham, Jones, Page	11:51
Total length:			73:10

Disc two
No.	Title	Writer(s)	Length
1.	"Immigrant Song"	Page, Plant	3:20
2.	"Heartbreaker"	Bonham, Jones, Page, Plant	5:16
3.	"Since I've Been Loving You"	Jones, Page, Plant	6:56
4.	"Black Dog"	Jones, Page, Plant	5:17
5.	"Dazed and Confused"	Page, inspired by Holmes	18:36
6.	"Stairway to Heaven"	Page, Plant	8:49
7.	"Going to California"	Page, Plant	3:54
8.	"That's the Way"	Page, Plant	5:43
9.	"Whole Lotta Love"/"Boogie Chillun'"/"Fixin' to Die"/"That's Alright Mama"/"A Mess of Blues""	Bonham, Jones, Page, Plant/John Lee Hooker/Bukka White/Arthur Crudup/Doc Pomus, Mort Shuman	13:45
10.	"Thank You"	Page, Plant	6:37
Total length:			76:13

=== The Complete Sessions edition – bonus disc ===
Nine recordings from a conglomerate of 1969 sessions, including "Dazed and Confused", "I Can't Quit You Baby", "You Shook Me" and "Sunshine Woman" along with two versions of both "Communication Breakdown" and "What Is and What Should Never Be" (recorded two years apart) were released on 16 September 2016, comprising a third disc of the previously two-disc BBC Sessions compilation. Eight of the nine songs were previously unreleased; "White Summer" was previously released in 1990 on the Led Zeppelin Boxed Set and the expanded 1993 reissue of Coda from The Complete Studio Recordings and Led Zeppelin Definitive Collection (2008) box sets. The lost March 1969 three-song session – by all accounts erased from its master tapes – appears on the disc sourced from a reputed AM radio recording. This session contains the oft-bootlegged, boogieing blues rocker "Sunshine Woman," a track that Zeppelin never formally released previously, and renditions of Willie Dixon's "I Can't Quit You Baby" and "You Shook Me."

Disc three
No.	Title	Writer(s)	Length
1.	"Communication Breakdown"	Bonham, Jones, Page	3:00
2.	"What Is and What Should Never Be"	Page, Plant	4:14
3.	"Dazed and Confused"	Page, inspired by Holmes	11:08
4.	"White Summer"	Page	8:22
5.	"What Is and What Should Never Be"	Page, Plant	4:44
6.	"Communication Breakdown"	Bonham, Jones, Page	4:54
7.	"I Can't Quit You Baby"	Dixon	5:26
8.	"You Shook Me"	Dixon, Lenoir	4:10
9.	"Sunshine Woman"	Bonham, Dixon, Johnson, Jones, Plant, Page	3:06
Total length:			48:14

== Recording information ==
Session one
John Peel's Top Gear

- Venue: Playhouse Theatre, Northumberland Avenue, London
- Recording date: Monday 3 March 1969
- Original broadcast: Sunday 23 March 1969 (in a show with sessions from Free, the Moody Blues and Deep Purple)
- Tracks: "Communication Breakdown" (disc 3, track 1), "Dazed and Confused" (disc 1, track 4), "You Shook Me" (disc 1, track 1), "I Can't Quit You Baby" (disc 1, track 2).
- Producer: Bernie Andrews
- Engineer: Pete Ritzema
- Tape operator: Bob Conduct

Session two
Alexis Korner's Rhythm and Blues, (BBC World Service)

- Venue: Maida Vale Studio 4, Delaware Road, London
- Recording date: Wednesday 19 March 1969
- Original broadcast: Monday 14 April 1969
- Tracks: "Sunshine Woman" (disc 3, track 9), "I Can't Quit You Baby" (disc 3, track 7), "You Shook Me" (disc 3, track 8).
- Notes: The session was wiped or lost by the BBC, although recordings survive on bootlegs. The show was re-run later in 1969, adding the recording of "What Is And What Should Never Be" from the June 16 session.
- Producer: Jeff Griffin

Session three
Chris Grant's Tasty Pop Sundae (originally commissioned for Dave Symond's Symonds On Sunday show)

- Venue: Aeolian Hall Studio 2, Bond Street, London
- Recording Date: Monday 16 June 1969
- Original Broadcast: Sunday 22 June 1969
- Tracks: "The Girl I Love She Got Long Black Wavy Hair" (disc 1, track 5), "Communication Breakdown" (disc 1, track 3), "Somethin' Else" (disc 1, track 10), "What Is and What Should Never Be" (disc 3, track 2).
- Producer: Paul Williams

Session four
John Peel's Top Gear (Double recording session)

- Venue: Maida Vale Studio 4, Delaware Road, London
- Recording date: Tuesday 24 June 1969
- Original broadcast: Sunday 29 June 1969
- Tracks: "Whole Lotta Love" (disc 1, track 9), "Communication Breakdown" (disc 1, track 7), "What Is and What Should Never Be" (disc 1, track 6), "Travelling Riverside Blues" (disc 1, track 8).
- Notes: "Travelling Riverside Blues" had previously been released on the Led Zeppelin box set and expanded versions of Coda.
- Producer: John Walters
- Engineer: Tony Wilson

Session five
One Night Stand

- Venue: Playhouse Theatre
- Recording date: Friday 27 June 1969
- Original broadcast: Sunday 10 August 1969
- Tracks: "Communication Breakdown" (disc 1, track 11), "I Can't Quit You Baby" (disc 1, track 12), "Dazed and Confused" (disc 3, track 3), "White Summer" (disc 3, track 4), "You Shook Me" (disc 1, track 13), "How Many More Times" (disc 1, track 14).
- Edits: "How Many More Times" has about a minute cut out while Robert Plant introduces the band during the song.
- Notes: "White Summer" had previously been released as "White Summer/Black Mountain Side" on the Led Zeppelin box set and expanded versions of Coda, but with 15 seconds cut out.

Session six
In Concert (Emcee John Peel)

- Venue: Paris Theatre, Lower Regent Street, London
- Recording date: Thursday 1 April 1971
- Original broadcast: Sunday 4 April 1971
- Tracks: "Immigrant Song", "Heartbreaker", "Since I've Been Loving You", "Black Dog", "Dazed and Confused", "Stairway to Heaven", "Going to California", "That's the Way" (disc 2, tracks 1–8), "What Is and What Should Never Be" (disc 3, track 5), "Whole Lotta Love" (medley, disc 2, track 9), "Thank You" (disc 2, track 10), "Communication Breakdown" (disc 3, track 6).
- Edits: The "Whole Lotta Love" medley has had "For What It's Worth", "Trucking Little Mama" and "Honey Bee" edited out, shortening the medley by seven minutes.
- Producer: Jeff Griffin
- Engineer: Tony Wilson

== Personnel ==
Led Zeppelin

- John Bonham – drums, percussion, backing vocals
- John Paul Jones – bass guitar, bass pedals, keyboards, mandolin, backing vocals
- Jimmy Page – acoustic and electric guitars, backing vocals, mastering, production
- Robert Plant – vocals, harmonica

Additional personnel

- Andie Airfix – art direction, design
- Jon Astley – mastering
- John Davis – mastering (The Complete BBC Sessions 2016 reissue)
- Luis Rey – liner notes
- Chris Walter – photography

== Charts ==
1997 weekly chart performance for BBC Sessions
Chart (1997)	Peak position
Canada Top Albums/CDs (RPM)	30
Finnish Albums (Suomen virallinen lista)	28
French Albums (SNEP)	38
Italian Albums (Musica e Dischi)	24
Japanese Albums (Oricon)	10
New Zealand Albums (RMNZ)	26
Norwegian Albums (VG-lista)	36
Swedish Albums (Sverigetopplistan)	50
UK Albums (Official Charts)	23
US Billboard 200	12

2016 weekly chart performance for The Complete BBC Sessions
Chart (2016)	Peak position
Australian Albums (ARIA)	34
Austrian Albums (Ö3 Austria)	32
Belgian Albums (Ultratop Flanders)	15
Belgian Albums (Ultratop Wallonia)	12
Canadian Albums (Billboard)	32
Dutch Albums (Album Top 100)	41
German Albums (Offizielle Top 100)	7
Hungarian Albums (MAHASZ)	11
Irish Albums (IRMA)	93
Italian Albums (FIMI)	14
Japanese Albums (Oricon)	3
New Zealand Albums (RMNZ)	21
Portuguese Albums (AFP)	18
Scottish Albums (Official Charts)	6
Spanish Albums (Promusicae)	28
Swiss Albums (Schweizer Hitparade)	18
UK Albums (Official Charts)	3
US Billboard 200	21

== Certifications ==
Certifications for BBC Sessions
Region	Certification	Certified units/sales
Japan (RIAJ)	Gold	100,000^{^}
United Kingdom (BPI)	Gold	100,000^{^}
United States (RIAA)	2× Platinum	1,000,000^{^}
^{^} Shipments figures based on certification alone.

== Release history ==
Release formats for BBC Sessions
Region	Date	Label	Format	Catalog #
United States	17 November 1997	Atlantic	4 LP	83061-1
United States	17 November 1997	Atlantic	2 Compact Disc	83061-2
United States	17 November 1997	Atlantic	2 Cassette	83061-4
United States	17 November 1997	Atlantic	3 Compact Disc	83074-2
United Kingdom	17 November 1997	Atlantic	2 Compact disc	7567-83061-2
Japan	17 November 1997	WEA Japan	2 Compact disc	11756-7
