= You Need Love (Muddy Waters song) =

1963 song by Muddy Waters

Single by Muddy Waters
- B-side: "Little Brown Bird"
- Released: 1962
- Recorded: Chicago, July & October 12, 1962
- Genre: Blues
- Length: 2:35
- Label: Chess
- Songwriter: Willie Dixon
- Producers: Leonard Chess; Phil Chess

Muddy Waters singles chronology
"You Shook Me" (1962)	"You Need Love" (1962)	"Five Long Years" (1963)

"You Need Love" is a song with lyrics written by the American blues musician Willie Dixon. The instrumentation was recorded first by slide guitarist Earl Hooker and backing musicians, then Chicago blues artist Muddy Waters overdubbed vocals, and Chess Records released it as a single in 1962.

The song has since been covered by other artists, including the Small Faces, retitled "You Need Loving". Led Zeppelin subsequently adapted aspects from both renditions for their 1969 hit "Whole Lotta Love", which prompted Dixon to file a lawsuit against them in 1985, after his daughter heard it.

== Muddy Waters song ==
=== Background ===
Similar to his previous single, "You Shook Me", Muddy Waters dubbed his vocals onto a backing track, a formula also followed for "Little Brown Bird" and "Black Angel". Chess Records owner Leonard Chess contacted blues slide guitarist Earl Hooker to record tunes for a new record by Waters in July 1962. While Waters was away on tour in Ohio, Hooker and the group cut three instrumental backing tracks. There are different accounts of who the instrumentalists were, other than Hooker and organist Big Moose Walker. On October 12, 1962, Waters overdubbed his vocals. Of the three recordings cut that day, "Black Angel" remains unissued.

The vocals are apparently derived from several earlier songs by Waters, such as "Rollin' Stone", "Still a Fool" and "She's Alright". The song is based on a guitar riff in the key of E minor. Marie Dixon, Willie Dixon's wife insists that the songs is specially about her:

I felt that was more close to me that he wrote is “You Need Love.” If you listen to those words, I feel that. 'You’re frettin’, I’m pettin’, you need love' that would be more soothing to me, more fitting to me that he wrote. And he had a way of speaking to you through his songs. And I feel that that may have been the one. I’ve always said that that was the one he sort of built the story around me.

— Marie Dixon, Willie Dixon: Preacher of the Blues pg. 193

=== Release ===
Chess first released the song on a 7-inch single, backed with "Little Brown Bird" in 1962. Although a November 10, 1962, review in Billboard indicated its sales potential, the single failed to reach the magazine's charts. In the United Kingdom, the single was subsequently withdrawn and replaced by a four-track EP with "Little Brown Bird", "You Shook Me" and "Muddy Waters Twist". The EP was a favorite of Jimmy Page and Jeff Beck during their teenage years.

=== Personnel ===
- Muddy Waters – lead vocals
- Earl Hooker – guitar
- John 'Big Moose' Walker – organ

Additional musicians may include:

- A.C. Reed – tenor sax
- Jackie Brenston – baritone sax
- Ernest Cotton – sax
- Earnest Johnson or Willie Dixon – bass
- Casey Jones or Bobby Little – drums
- Lafayette Leake – piano
- Unidentified – overdubbed percussion (Mbira)

== Small Faces version ==
"You Need Loving"

Song by Small Faces

from the album Small Faces
- Released: May 11, 1966
- Recorded: February 1966
- Studio: IBC, London
- Genre: Rhythm and blues; hard rock
- Length: 3:56
- Label: Decca
- Songwriters: Steve Marriott; Ronnie Lane (credited)
- Producers: John Pantry; Don Arden

Audio sample
- "You Need Loving": file; help

Three years after its initial release, London band Small Faces released the track as "You Need Loving" for their eponymous debut album in 1966. The tune, which was a largely improvisational jam by the group, had been a part of their live repertoire along with other rhythm and blues songs since they formed, and was therefore popular with the mod subculture of the 1960s. At the time, their setlist consisted of about five songs, two originals by Steve Marriott and Ronnie Lane, "E Too D" and "Come On Children". The remaining songs were "Ooh Poo Pah Doo", "Baby Don't You Do It" and "You Need Love". It is also noteworthy for 19-year old Marriott's raw vocals, one of his most well known characteristics.

It was fantastic, I loved it, Muddy Waters recorded it but I couldn't sing like Muddy Waters so it wasn't that much of a nick. I was a high range and Muddy was a low range so I had to figure out how to sing it. So I did and that was our opening number for all the years we were together. Every time we were on stage that was our opening number, unless we had a short set.

— Steve Marriott, Steve Marriott: All Too Beautiful... pg. 78

The opening verse of the Muddy Waters' original was not included anywhere in "You Need Loving", with the Small Faces adding their own bits instead, such as "Eeny, meeny, miny, moe" and "I can't monkey and I can't dog. Can't do the monkey, yeah"

You've got yearnin' and I got burnin'
Baby you look so, ho, sweet and cunnin'
Baby way down inside, woman you need love
Woman you need love, you've got to have some love

— First verse, Muddy Waters, "You Need Love", 1962

In fact, the majority of the track was re-written in order to better fit Marriott's style of singing. The first verse was completely remade by replacing it with an altered version of the last verse found in "You Need Love":

Woah you foolin'
Come and get coolin'
I'm gonna send you right back to school, alright
Make your way down the new side girl
You know how woman, you need lovin', lovin', alright

— First verse, Small Faces, "You Need Loving", 1966

Despite containing several verses found in the original, it is only credited to Marriott and Ronnie Lane on original 1966 pressings of the group's debut album. Allegedly, this was a business tactic used by Small Faces manager Don Arden in order to get more royalties. In fact, Arden kept the royalties himself, with the band earning only £20 a week, despite multiple top ten entries on the UK Singles Chart. Dixon did not sue Arden or the band, because he did not know of its existence. On most later reissues of the album, Dixon is credited as a songwriter. The group recorded the song live for Saturday Club and can be found on the compilation album The BBC Sessions.

=== Personnel ===
- Steve Marriott – lead vocals, lead guitar
- Ronnie Lane – bass guitar, backing vocals
- Ian McLagan – Hammond organ, backing vocals
- Kenney Jones – drums

== Similarities with "Whole Lotta Love" ==
In 1969, Led Zeppelin recorded "Whole Lotta Love", a song with some similar lyrics and melody line. It was largely conceived by Jimmy Page, but is credited to the entire band. Lyrically however, the song refers to "You Need Love"

You need cooling
Baby I'm not fooling
I'm gonna send ya
Back to schoolin'

— Led Zeppelin, "Whole Lotta Love", 1969

Vocally, lead singer Robert Plant phrases the song in the style of Marriott, similar to "You Need Loving". Marriott said, "He sang it the same, phrased it the same, even the stops at the end were the same". Marriott said both Page and Plant attended Small Faces concerts: "That’s where Jimmy Page and Robert Plant heard it. Robert Plant used to follow us around. He was like a fan."

Plant eventually apologised to Marriott in a backstage encounter during the 1970s. However, Marriott liked "Whole Lotta Love", and the first time he heard it he reportedly shouted "Go on, my son!" In 1985, Dixon filed a lawsuit against the group after his daughter brought it to his attention.

I ultimately learned ... about the “Whole Lotta Love,” because I was typing those songs, and he taught me to write music. So I immediately could recognize one of his songs. He taught me the lyric structure and he taught me the music. So, you know, it became obvious to me after a while listened and listened. I was at girlfriend’s house, and the song came on the radio. And I said, “You know what? That’s my dad’s song.” And she says, "The song is probably as old as you are (I was thirteen, then), and let’s see I’ve got the album,” she said, “If they’ve got your dad’s name on it ..." She said to me, “Well, they’ve got another song on here that your dad wrote, "I Can't Quit You Baby", but that’s ["Whole Lotta Love"] not his song. I said, "Oh, yes it is." And she said, "Have you ever heard him singing it?" I said, "No, I haven’t, but he taught me how to write. And I see a similar pattern, either he wrote it or it’s twained [sic], and that’s why."

— Shirli Dixon, Willie Dixon: Preacher of the Blues pg. 193

The case was eventually settled out of court and on all reissues of Led Zeppelin II, Dixon is credited as a co-writer on the track. Page has repeatedly objected to claims that the composition was plagiarized, insisting that only the lyrics were.

Some people said later that “Whole Lotta Love” was based on Willie Dixon’s “You Need Love” and the Small Faces’ “You Need Loving”. My riff – the basis for the entire song – sounds nothing like either of them. Robert had referenced the Dixon lyrics because with my riff, they felt right. This eventually forced us to give Dixon a cocredit on our song. But if you take Robert’s vocal out, there’s no musical reference to either song.

— Marc Myers, How one of Led Zeppelin's greatest hits was made, Business Insider

Plant later complained,

Page's riff was Page's riff. It was there before anything else. I just thought, 'well, what am I going to sing?' That was it, a nick. Now happily paid for. At the time, there was a lot of conversation about what to do. It was decided that it was so far away in time and influence that ... well, you only get caught when you're successful. That's the game.

— Robert Plant, Musician Issue 135-140. p. 45

== Other covers ==
- English blues rock band Savoy Brown covered the song for their second studio album Getting to the Point in 1968. It is considered one of the better songs on the album.
- The Hoochie Coochie Men with Deep Purple keyboardist Jon Lord recorded the song live on February 3, 2003, for their 2003 live album Live At The Basement.
- Peter Green's Fleetwood Mac covered the song for the BBC on 27 August 1968, it went unreleased for over 50 years, until it was finally released on The Complete Unreleased BBC Anthology 1967-1968.

== See also ==
- List of songs subject to plagiarism disputes
- List of Led Zeppelin songs written or inspired by others

== Notes ==
=== References ===
- Chess (1989). Muddy Waters: Chess Box (Box set booklet). Muddy Waters. Chess/MCA Records. OCLC 154264537. CHD3-80002.
- Danchin, Sebastian (2001). Earl Hooker: Blues Master. University Press of Mississippi. ISBN 1-57806-306-X.
- Hewitt, Paulo; Hellier, John (2004). Steve Marriott: All Too Beautiful... Helter Skelter. ISBN 1-900924-44-7.
- Hoffman, Frank (1983). The Cash Box Singles Charts, 1950–1981. Scarecrow Press. ISBN 978-0810815957.
- Inaba, Mitsutoshi (2011). Willie Dixon: Preacher of the Blues. Scarecrow Press. ISBN 978-0-8108-6993-6.
- Lewis, Dave (1990). Led Zeppelin : A Celebration. Omnibus Press. ISBN 978-0-711-92416-1.
- Muise, Dan (2002). Gallagher, Marriott, Derringer & Trower: Their Lives and Music. Hal Leonard. ISBN 978-0634029561.
- Twelker, Uli; Schmitt, Roland (2011). The Small Faces & Other Stories. Bobcat Books. ISBN 978-0-85712-451-7.
- Wall, Mick (2010). When Giants Walked the Earth: A Biography of Led Zeppelin. St. Martin's Griffin. ISBN 978-0-312-59039-0.
