= Aerodrome (disambiguation) =

An aerodrome is any place at which flight operations take place. In British English, it refers chiefly to a small airport or airfield.

Aerodrome or airdrome may refer to:

== Aviation ==
- Aerodromes, various heavier-than-air flying machines, including those built by the Canadian Aerial Experiment Association
- Langley Aerodrome, a pioneering but unsuccessful series of powered flying machines designed at the close of the 19th century by Smithsonian Institution Secretary Samuel Langley
- Terminal aerodrome forecast, an international format for reporting aviation weather forecast information

== Brands and enterprises ==
- Aerodrome, an ice-skating rink in Houston, Texas
- The Aerodrome (nightclub), a former nightclub in Schenectady, New York
- Airdrome, Richard and Maurice McDonald's first food venture, a hotdog stand in Monrovia, California, before moving the entire building to San Bernardino in 1940 and renaming it McDonald's

== Other uses ==
- The Aerodrome, a 1941 novel by Rex Warner
  - The Aerodrome (film), a 1983 TV film
