= Paseo (restaurant) =

Caribbean sandwich shops in Seattle, Washington, U.S.

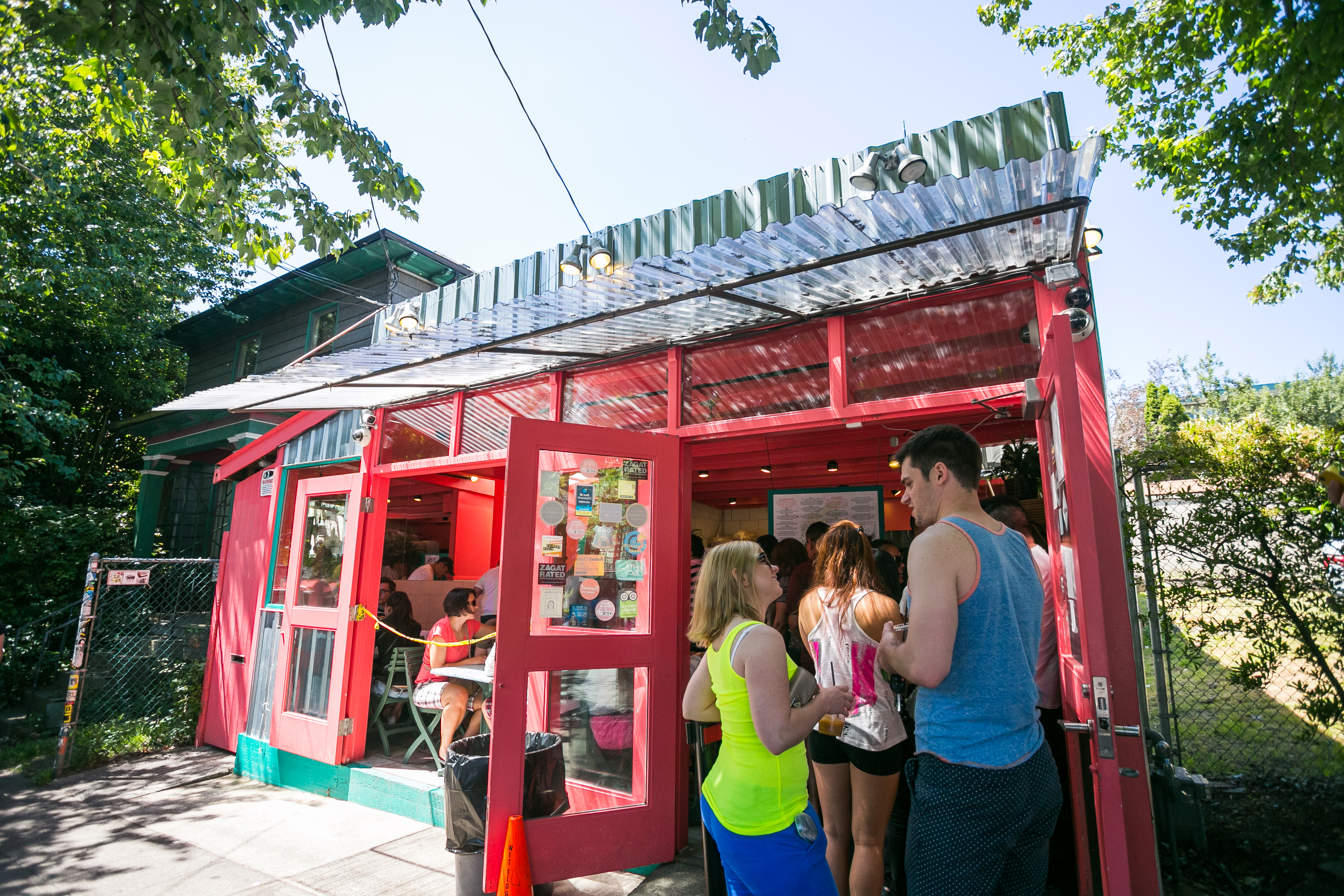
- A line outside of the original Fremont location in 2013
- Interactive map of Paseo

Restaurant information
- Established: 1994
- Owner: Ryan Santwire
- Food type: Caribbean
- Location: King, Washington, United States
- Coordinates: 47°39′31″N 122°21′01″W

Paseo is a chain of Caribbean sandwich shops based in Seattle, Washington, United States. It was founded in 1994 and went bankrupt in 2014 before being revived under new ownership the following year. The restaurant has four locations in King County.

== History ==
The first Paseo was opened in Fremont in 1994 by Lorenzo Lorenzo, a Cuban-born chef. The early menu included $6–$7.50 dinner plates as well as sandwiches with chicken, pork, and prawn that cost up to $5.50. A second location, in a pink building facing Shilshole Bay in western Ballard, opened in August 2008. Both restaurants were cash-only and primarily served takeout with limited seating for customers; Paseo also drew long lines that extended out of the building on most weekends. The restaurant also closed annually for a "winter break" in late December. Paseo ranked fifth on review website Yelp's highest-rated restaurants list in 2014 and began opening on Sundays.

In September 2014, four former workers filed a civil suit against Lorenzo and the restaurant that accused them of wage theft and "racially motivated mistreatment", which Paseo denied. Both locations abruptly closed on November 11, 2014, citing "unfortunate circumstances" that were unrelated to the lawsuit according to an employee. Upon its closure, Paseo was trending locally on Twitter, fans of the restaurant left flowers and held a candlelight vigil, and several publications posted eulogies for the restaurant. The following day, Paseo filed for bankruptcy with more than $30,000 in listed debts; several employees also contacted local alt-weekly newspaper The Stranger to deny the lawsuit's claims. A Kickstarter campaign was started by fans of the restaurant and raised $40,000 within its first week, but funds were withdrawn by backers following comments by former Paseo employees that disapproved of the attempt.

In December 2014, local entrepreneur Ryan Santwire won a federal court auction for the Paseo name and assets and announced plans to revive the restaurant. The $91,000 bid did not include the original recipes following an objection from Lorenzo; instead, Santwire and several former Paseo employees recreated the recipes through reverse engineering. The Fremont location reopened on January 8, 2015, and had 50 customers within the first 30 minutes. The restaurant retained much of its former staff and suppliers, but began accepting credit cards. Lorenzo's sons opened their own Ballard sandwich shop, named Un Bien, in June 2015 using the original restaurant's recipes and former staff. Un Bien later opened a second location in the former Shilshole Bay location for Paseo a year later.

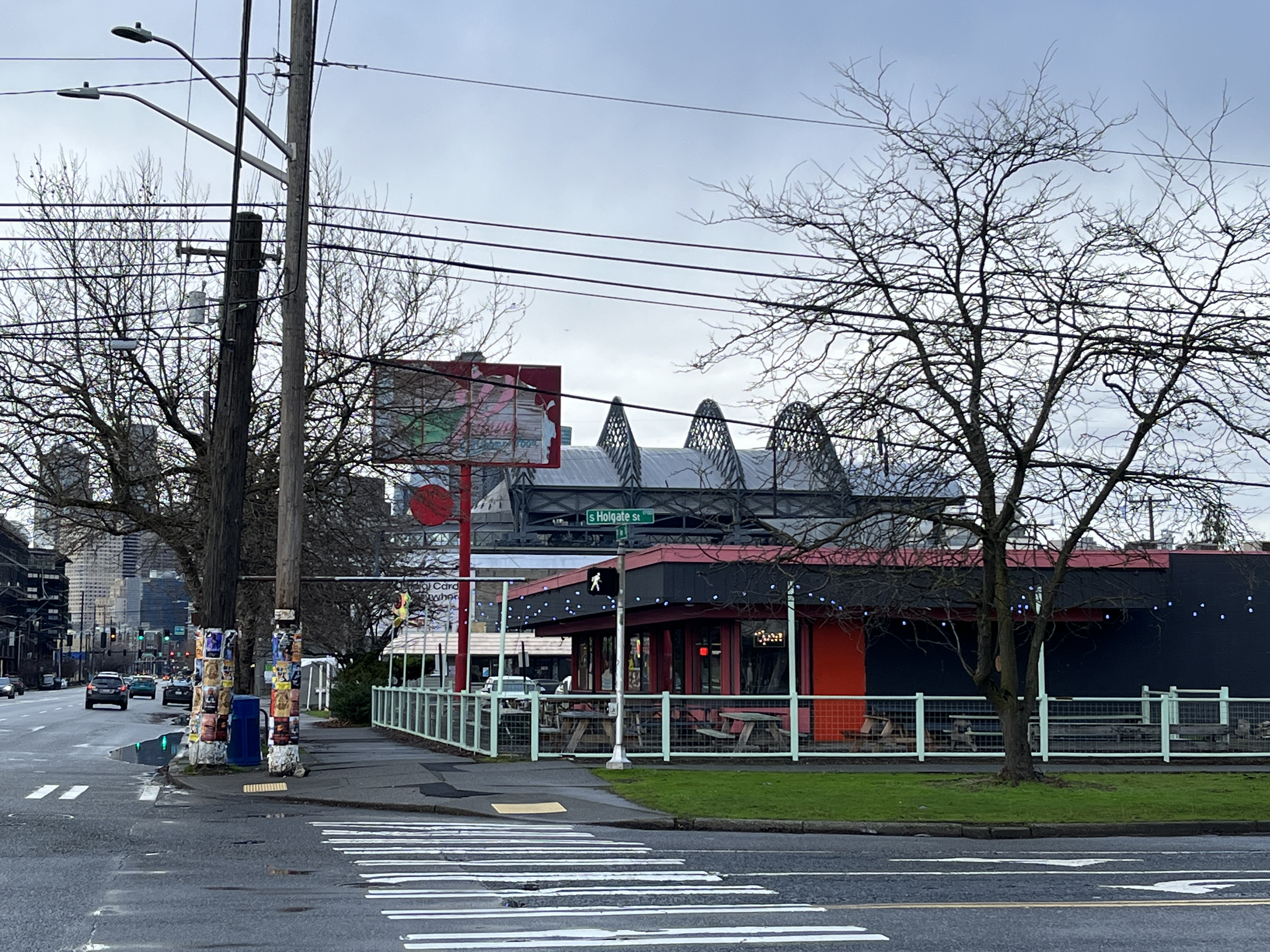
Exterior of the SoDo restaurant, 2023

A second Paseo location opened in SoDo on July 28, 2016, at a 4,000-square-foot (370 m^{2}) space leased from Chris R. Hansen, who had acquired the site for a potential basketball arena. Planning for the location began in September 2015 but its opening was delayed due to several issues, including the building losing power due to vandalism. The larger restaurant includes more seating space, alcoholic beverages, and roasted corn. In 2019, Paseo offered its sandwiches and roasted corn at nearby T-Mobile Park during Seattle Mariners games. The SoDo location was temporarily converted into a drive-in theater with movie screenings during the COVID-19 pandemic while continuing to offer catering.

A location on Capitol Hill adjacent to Neumos opened in February 2017, but closed nine months later and was replaced by a Bok a Bok fried chicken shop. Paseo later opened a branch at the Microsoft Redmond campus and a full-sized store in Issaquah in August 2022. Several customers camped overnight while waiting for the Issaquah location to open. Paseo has announced plans to expand to Federal Way or Tacoma by 2023 and other suburban cities in the future.

== Reception ==
In 2010, TLC series Best Food Ever ranked Paseo's Cuban Roast as the second-best sandwich in the United States. However, the same year, blogger Geraldine DeRuiter listed Paseo as the top entry of her "Over-Hyped List: Seattle Restaurant Edition".

In 2015, Seattle Magazine called the reopened Paseo's flagship sandwich "unquestionably overrated", and that the original's "[wasn't] ever as good as people used to say that it was."

== See also ==
- List of restaurant chains in the United States
