= Chris Walter =

English photographer

Chris Walter was a photographer of classic rock and pop musicians, who began working in London in the early 1960s, photographing mainly rock musicians.

He initially began the company South London Photo Agency (later The London Photo Agency), co-founded the company London Features in the early 1970s and in 1975 set up his main project for media use, Photofeatures International.

A resident of California since 1977, his photography continued to be used in numerous projects, including US and international publications, television, books, documentaries and album artwork of such artists as The Who, Rod Stewart, The Doors, Donovan, Scott Walker, Jimi Hendrix and Led Zeppelin. An exhibit of his photographs was shown at Red Rocks Amphitheatre in 2007.

Chris died in October 2018.
