= Seattle Pop Festival =

American music festival

- Genre: Rock, pop, jazz, soul, blues
- Dates: July 25 to July 27, 1969
- Locations: Woodinville, Washington; United States
- Years active: 1969
- Founders: Boyd Grafmyre
- Attendance: 50,000-100,000 (est. for 3 days)

The Seattle Pop Festival was a music festival held at Gold Creek Park in Woodinville, Washington from July 25 to July 27, 1969. The event was organized by Boyd Grafmyre.

== Overview ==
The plan for Seattle Pop was to have 25 acts play over the course of three days at Gold Creek Park located at 16020 148th Ave NE. Promoter Boyd Grafmyre went to great lengths to make sure performers arrived. He chartered a helicopter to fly The Doors from Seattle's airport and rented a Cadillac convertible for Chuck Berry.

Tickets for the event cost $6 for a day or $15 for all three days. An estimated 50,000-100,000 people attended the festival. Seattle Pop was one of the festivals to forgo hiring police or off-duty officers as security; instead, Grafmyre hired The Black Panthers to keep watch.

Because attendance was larger than expected, extra food and water needed to be brought into the venue. According to one source: "Sanitary facilities were inadequate, but every attempt was made to meet county requirements ..." Nearby neighbors complained of traffic and the hippie atmosphere, but Chick Dawsey, owner of Gold Creek, noted that spectators were orderly with very few exceptions."

== Performers ==
The Seattle Pop's line-up was a mix of established acts, native groups from the Pacific Northwest. Twenty-six musicians and groups performed at the festival. The Doors, Chuck Berry, The Byrds and The Ike & Tina Turner Revue were among the most highly-anticipated acts, but newcomers Led Zeppelin emerged as the highlight. "Sunday night was supposed to belong to The Doors but it was stolen right out from under them by the great English blues group, Led Zeppelin," wrote the Seattle Post-Intelligencer.

=== List of performers ===
- Crome Syrcus
- Bo Diddley
- The Flying Burrito Brothers
- Ten Years After
- The Guess Who
- Murray Roman
- Albert Collins
- Santana
- Youngbloods
- Tim Buckley
- It's a Beautiful Day
- Byrds
- Alice Cooper
- Floating Bridge
- Charles Lloyd
- The Flock
- Ike & Tina Turner Revue
- Lonnie Mack
- Chicago Transit Authority
- Chuck Berry
- Blacksnake
- Spirit
- Vanilla Fudge
- Rockin' Fu
- Led Zeppelin
- Lee Michaels
- The Doors

== See also ==
- List of music festivals
- List of historic rock festivals
