= The Aerodrome (nightclub) =

Former nightclub in Schenectady, New York

The Aerodrome was a nightclub located at 1588 State Street in Schenectady, New York. The venue was created when the building, formerly a 32-lane bowling alley named Woodlawn Lanes, was converted into a nightclub beginning in 1967 by Nat Rubin, a New York City dress manufacturer, and Jack Herman, a Rochester attorney, in partnership with Terrance Clifford-Hooper, an English former fashion designer. The club opened on January 25, 1968, with a capacity of approximately 3,000 people.

Rock bands and musicians who performed at the Aerodrome include Led Zeppelin, Janis Joplin, Billy Joel, B.J. Thomas, The Electric Prunes, Vanilla Fudge, Three Dog Night, Jeff Beck Group (featuring a young Rod Stewart and Ronnie Wood), Chicago, The Yardbirds, and B. B. King.

The club closed in 1972; among the reasons cited by those involved were owner Nat Rubin's declining health, rising costs, and disputes over its liquor license. The building was later demolished.
