= List of Led Zeppelin songs written or inspired by others =

In their career, the British rock band Led Zeppelin recorded many songs that consisted, in whole or part, of pre-existing songs, melodies, or lyrics. They sometimes credited those sources; sometimes not. The band has been sued a number of times over attribution, some cases having concluded with others being awarded writing credit for the song in question, some not.

This is a partial list of songs that contributed to or inspired Led Zeppelin songs or covers. It includes non-controversial ones the band attributed to other writers from the outset.

== Led Zeppelin ==
=== "Babe I'm Gonna Leave You" ===
The band covered Joan Baez's version of the song written by Anne Bredon; both guitarist Jimmy Page and singer Robert Plant were fans of Baez. Baez's album Joan Baez in Concert, where Baez's version of the song appeared, had originally indicated no writing credit, and Led Zeppelin credited the song as "Trad. arr. Page". In the 1980s, Bredon was made aware of Led Zeppelin's version of the song, and since 1990 the Led Zeppelin version has been credited to Anne Bredon/Jimmy Page & Robert Plant. Bredon received a substantial back-payment of royalties. Music critic Andy Hermann researched and rejected the common accusation that Page copied the guitar riff from either Chicago or George Harrison. The basis of the intro riff may have also been inspired by Donovan's track "Hampstead Incident”. This song featured on the album Mellow Yellow: both Page and John Paul Jones featured as guest musicians on the album.

=== "You Shook Me" ===
This song was correctly credited to Willie Dixon, but a similar controversy exists over whether Page got the idea from friend and former bandmate Jeff Beck:

[Beck] had the same sort of taste in music as I did. That's why you'll find on the early LPs we both did a song like "You Shook Me." It was the type of thing we'd both played in bands. Someone told me he'd already recorded it after we'd already put it down on the first Zeppelin album. I thought, "Oh dear, it's going to be identical", but it was nothing like it, fortunately. I just had no idea he'd done it. It was on Truth but I first heard it when I was in Miami after we'd recorded our version. It's a classic example of coming from the same area musically, of having a similar taste.

Major differences between both versions include the prominence afforded Nicky Hopkins's keyboard playing in the Mickie Most mix, and that Rod Stewart sings only two verses in the Jeff Beck recording.

=== "Dazed and Confused" ===
In 1967, while touring with the Yardbirds, Page saw Jake Holmes perform the song in New York. Page was performing his version of this song with the Yardbirds, before forming Led Zeppelin. On the first Led Zeppelin album, the band's version was credited solely to Jimmy Page. A 2010 lawsuit appears to have been settled out of court, the case being dismissed and Holmes being added to the songwriting credit.

=== "Black Mountain Side" ===
Al Stewart learned Bert Jansch's version of the traditional song "Down by Blackwaterside". However, he mistook Jansch's 'drop-D' tuning for DADGAD. At the time, Stewart was recording his own debut record and had engaged Jimmy Page as a session musician. According to Stewart's account, it was he (Stewart) who taught Page 'Blackwaterside' (the DADGAD version) during a tea-break. In spite of this difference, Jansch's record company sought legal advice following the release of Led Zeppelin. Early in 1965, Anne Briggs and Jansch were performing regularly together in folk clubs and spent most of the daytime at a friend's flat, collaborating on new songs and the development of complex guitar accompaniments for traditional songs.

Ultimately, no legal action was taken against Led Zeppelin, because it could not be proven that the recording in itself constituted Jansch's own copyright, as the basic melody was traditional.

Nevertheless, Jansch said that Page "ripped me off, didn't he? Or let's just say he learned from me."

=== "I Can't Quit You Baby" ===
This song was published by Willie Dixon only three years earlier, and correctly attributed when Led Zeppelin covered it on their debut album.

=== "How Many More Times" ===
This song's lack of attribution to Howlin' Wolf's song "How Many More Years" has never been changed. No lawsuits have been filed. The song also contains components of Albert King's "The Hunter".

== Led Zeppelin II ==
=== "Whole Lotta Love" ===
The band was sued over similarities of this song to "You Need Love", written by Willie Dixon, The suit was settled out of court in Dixon's favour. Plant later said "Page's riff was Page's riff. It was there before anything else. I just thought, 'well, what am I going to sing?' That was it, a nick. Now happily paid for. At the time, there was a lot of conversation about what to do. It was decided that it was so far away in time and influence that... well, you only get caught when you're successful. That's the game." The Small Faces also recorded a version of the song in 1966 titled "You Need Lovin", two years before Led Zeppelin had formed as a band, and as Robert Plant was a dedicated fan of the group and their vocalist Steve Marriott, their sound undoubtedly influenced Plant's vocal style on the Led Zeppelin version.

=== "The Lemon Song" ===
Led Zeppelin performed "Killing Floor" live in 1968 and 1969, and it became the basis for "The Lemon Song", from 1969's Led Zeppelin II. In some early performances Robert Plant introduced the song as "Killing Floor"; an early UK pressing of Led Zeppelin II showed the title as "Killing Floor" and was credited to Chester Burnett (Howlin' Wolf's legal name). The song evolved into "The Lemon Song", with Plant often improvising lyrics onstage (the opening lyrics to both songs are identical).

Other lyrics, notably "squeeze (my lemon) till the juice runs down my leg," can be traced to Robert Johnson's "Travelling Riverside Blues". It is likely that Johnson borrowed this himself, from a song recorded earlier in the same year (1937) called "She Squeezed My Lemon" (by Arthur McKay). The song also references Albert King's "Cross-Cut Saw" In December 1972, Arc Music, owner of the publishing rights to Howlin' Wolf's songs, sued Led Zeppelin for copyright infringement on "The Lemon Song". The parties settled out of court. Though the amount was not disclosed, Howlin' Wolf received a check for US$45,123 from Arc Music immediately following the suit, and subsequent releases included a co-songwriter credit for him.

=== "Moby Dick" ===
The intro and outro were "inspired by" the Bobby Parker song Watch Your Step, the rest of the track being a long drum solo.

=== "Bring It on Home" ===
The intro and outro were deliberate homages to the Sonny Boy Williamson II song, whereas the rest of the track was original: however, Williamson was not given a lyric writing credit for the song. In 1972, Chess Records brought a lawsuit against Led Zeppelin for copyright infringement; the case was settled out-of-court.

== Led Zeppelin III ==
=== "Since I've Been Loving You" ===
The initial and closing lyrics are nearly identical to the Moby Grape song "Never", written by Bob Mosley.

=== "Gallows Pole" ===
This song was correctly attributed as traditional, from the beginning. Page credits the Fred Gerlach version as his inspiration, though the song has a much older history as "The Maid Freed from the Gallows".

=== "Bron-Y-Aur Stomp" ===
Jimmy Page repeatedly mentioned Bert Jansch as an influence in interviews. Jansch's album Jack Orion contained two tracks whose components later appeared in Page songs without writing credit. Jansch bandmate Jacqui McShee later said:

Actually, I think it's a very rude thing to do. Pinch somebody else's thing and credit it to yourself. It annoys me. ... In all the English papers at home he's always talking about Bert. Says he's influenced. I mean, why say that and then put something on an LP and say Jimmy Page?

=== "Hats Off to (Roy) Harper" ===
The song is a medley of fragments of blues songs and lyrics, including "Shake 'Em On Down" by Bukka White. Therefore, the song is both a tribute to contemporary folk singer Roy Harper and the influential American blues singer who recorded from the 1930s to the 1970s.

== Led Zeppelin IV ==
=== "Stairway to Heaven" ===
Zeppelin opened for Spirit in an early American tour, and even covered Spirit songs in early shows, leaving little doubt that Led Zeppelin had heard the Spirit song "Taurus" before "Stairway to Heaven" was written. In the liner notes to the 1996 reissue of Spirit's debut album, songwriter Randy California writes:

People always ask me why "Stairway to Heaven" sounds exactly like "Taurus", which was released two years earlier. I know Led Zeppelin also played "Fresh Garbage" in their live set. They opened up for us on their first American tour.

After a copyright infringement suit and subsequent appeals, the United States Court of Appeals for the Ninth Circuit ruled in favour of Led Zeppelin on 9 March 2020. It upheld the previous jury verdict finding the song did not infringe on "Taurus". The ruling was appealed to the Supreme Court of the United States, who decided not to hear the case and let the Appeals Court decision stand. The Supreme Court's decision precludes further appeals, thus ending the copyright dispute.

Musicologist Lawrence Ferrara has also pointed out the similarity to the folk song "To Catch a Shad", especially the arrangement by the Modern Folk Quartet on their 1963 self-titled album. This arrangement shares more elements in common with Stairway to Heaven, such as the ascending melody on top of the descending bassline.

=== "When the Levee Breaks" ===
This song used lyrics from the original and was credited to Memphis Minnie along with the band from the beginning, without controversy, although Kansas Joe McCoy did not receive a writer's credit on it. Memphis Minnie biographers have suggested she may have been the main lyricist, especially considering that she and her family were victims of the Great Mississippi Flood of 1927 described in the song, whereas McCoy lived in Tennessee at that time. The lyrics sung during the fadeout appear to be borrowed from "Goin' to Chicago Blues" by Joe Williams, Lambert, Hendricks & Ross.

== Physical Graffiti ==
=== "Custard Pie" ===
The lyrics to the riff-heavy song pay homage to the blues songs of the Robert Johnson era; specifically "Drop Down Mama" by Sleepy John Estes, "Shake 'Em On Down" by Bukka White, and "I Want Some of Your Pie" by Blind Boy Fuller.

=== "In My Time of Dying" ===
First recorded in 1928 by Blind Willie Johnson as "Jesus Make Up My Dying Bed", the lyrics appeared in earlier spirituals and hymns. Numerous artists have recorded it since, including Bob Dylan as "In My Time of Dyin'" with the writing credit listed as "traditional".

=== "Trampled Under Foot" ===
The lyrics were inspired by blues musician Robert Johnson's 1936 "Terraplane Blues". A Terraplane is a classic car, and the song uses car parts as metaphors for sex—"pump your gas", "rev all night", etc. The themes of these songs however differ; "Terraplane Blues" is about infidelity, while "Trampled Under Foot" is about giving in to sexual temptation.

=== "Boogie with Stu" ===
The song is credited to "Page/Plant/Jones/Bonham/Ian Stewart/Mrs. Valens", being heavily based on Ritchie Valens' "Ooh, My Head". Valens's publisher, Kemo Music, filed suit for copyright infringement and an out-of-court settlement was reached. As Page explained:

What we tried to do was give Ritchie's mother credit, because we heard she never received any royalties from any of her son's hits, and Robert did lean on that lyric a bit. So what happens? They tried to sue us for all of the song!

== Presence ==
=== "Nobody's Fault but Mine" ===
"Nobody's Fault but Mine" is a gospel song that has been recorded by many musicians over the years. The first known recording of this song was by American gospel blues musician Blind Willie Johnson in 1927, titled "It's Nobody's Fault but Mine". In an interview, Jimmy Page explained:

Robert [Plant] came in one day and suggested that we cover it, but the arrangement I came up with was nothing to do with the [Blind Willie Johnson] original. Robert may have wanted to go for the original blues lyrics, but everything else was a totally different kettle of fish.

Led Zeppelin biographer George Case adds "Page was likely more mindful of John Renbourn's 1966 acoustic take (credited to [trad. arr.] Renbourn) than [Blind Willie] Johnson's".

== BBC Sessions ==
=== "The Girl I Love She Got Long Black Wavy Hair" ===
The lyrics in the first verse are an adaptation of the 1929 blues recording "The Girl I Love She Got Long Curley Hair" by Sleepy John Estes. Snippets of the song appeared in the "Whole Lotta Love" medley until 1971.

=== "Travelling Riverside Blues" ===
"Travelling Riverside Blues" is a blues song written by the bluesman Robert Johnson. He sang it during his last recording session on June 20, 1937, in Dallas, Texas.

== How the West Was Won ==
=== "Let's Have a Party" ===
The song was correctly attributed to Wanda Jackson.

=== "Hello Mary Lou" ===
In the 2003 release of "How the West Was Won" abbreviated versions of this song and the original by Ricky Nelson are covered in the "Whole Lotta Love (Live)" track. "Let's Have a Party" begins at 8:00 in that track, while "Hello Mary Lou" begins at 9:58.

== See also ==
- List of songs recorded by Led Zeppelin
- Led Zeppelin bootleg recordings
- Led Zeppelin discography
- Led Zeppelin covers and tributes
