= I Can't Quit You Baby =

Blues standard written by Willie Dixon

Single by Otis Rush
- B-side: "Sit Down Baby"
- Released: August 1956
- Recorded: c. July 1956
- Studio: Boulevard Recording, Chicago
- Genre: Blues
- Length: 2:56
- Label: Cobra
- Songwriter: Willie Dixon
- Producer: Willie Dixon

Otis Rush singles chronology
"I Can't Quit You Baby" (1956)	"My Love Will Never Die" (1956)

"I Can't Quit You Baby" is a blues song written by Willie Dixon and first recorded by Chicago blues artist Otis Rush in 1956. It is a slow twelve-bar blues ensemble piece, with lyrics about the consequences of an adulterous relationship which is difficult to end.

"I Can't Quit You Baby" was Rush's first recording and Cobra Records' debut single. It became a record chart hit as well as a blues standard. Rush updated the song in 1966 with a modified arrangement, which was adapted by Led Zeppelin for their 1969 debut album.

== Original song ==
According to biographer Mitsutoshi Inaba "the song subject is the consequences of adultery and the feeling that a man cannot give up a relationship":

I can't quit you, baby
But I've got to put you down for awhile
You know I can't quit you, baby
But I've got to put you down for awhile
Well, you messed up my happy home, babe
Made me mistreat my only child

In his autobiography, Willie Dixon explained that "I Can't Quit You Baby" was written about a relationship Rush was preoccupied with at the time; Dixon used this to draw out an impassioned performance by Rush. Despite being solely credited to Dixon, Rush felt that the song's identity is very much his own:

Willie would just hum the sound, he never played anything, you know. He would try to give me some phrases how the song go and I pretty much did it on my own, the way it sounded. The way I sang the song and the way I played my guitar is what I wanted to play.

Inaba added: "Otis' passionate vocal melody with alternations of natural voice, falsetto, shouts, and growls, is his singing style indeed". The song is notated in the key of A major in 12/8 time with a "slow blues" tempo. Rush's original version consists of four twelve-bar vocal sections with lead guitar fills. It was Rush's first recording and took place in Chicago around July 1956. Accompanying Rush on lead guitar and vocal are Big Walter Horton on harmonica, Red Holloway on tenor sax, Lafayette Leake on piano, Wayne Bennett on second guitar, Dixon on bass, and Al Duncan on drums.

"I Can't Quit You Baby" was a vehicle for arranger-producer Dixon to launch Rush and Cobra Records, as it was the first single for both. In this regard, it was a success, reaching number six on Billboard's Rhythm & Blues Records chart in 1956.

Otis Rush revisited "I Can't Quit You Baby" several times over the years. His 1966 re-recording for the 1966 blues compilation Chicago/The Blues/Today! Vol. 2 uses an altered arrangement with an unusual turnaround (tonic chord followed by a half-step above the tonic chord). Subsequent cover versions usually use the chord substitutions found in Rush's Vanguard rendition.

== Led Zeppelin versions ==
"I Can't Quit You Baby"

Song by Led Zeppelin

from the album Led Zeppelin
- Released: January 12, 1969
- Recorded: October 15, 1968
- Studio: Olympic, London
- Genre: Psychedelic blues
- Length: 4:42
- Label: Atlantic
- Songwriter: Willie Dixon
- Producer: Jimmy Page

English rock band Led Zeppelin recorded "I Can't Quit You Baby" for their 1969 debut album Led Zeppelin. According to music journalist Cub Koda, their rendition is "a note-for-note copy of Otis Rush's" 1966 Vanguard version, although with different instrumentation and dynamics. It also incorporates a break during the guitar solo where Jimmy Page plays a four-bar unaccompanied set-up before relaunching into the solo. Although biographer Keith Shadwick notes Page's fluff on the turnaround coming out of the solo, he concludes the song "ends up as one of the most successful pieces on the first album, with no flat spots and a perfectly symmetrical form, all within the classic blues tradition".

Led Zeppelin regularly performed "I Can't Quit You Baby" in concert from 1968 to early 1970. Two live versions from 1969 are included on the 1997 BBC Sessions. A performance of the song on January 9, 1970, at Royal Albert Hall is included on the 2003 Led Zeppelin DVD (an edited version of this performance was released on the 1982 Coda album). In 1970, the song was dropped from Led Zeppelin's typical concert lineup as they incorporated material from Led Zeppelin III into their shows, with "I Can't Quit You Baby" essentially being replaced by "Since I've Been Loving You". It was however revived as part of the "Whole Lotta Love" medley during some Led Zeppelin concerts in 1972 and 1973. The song was rehearsed by the surviving members of Led Zeppelin for the May 14, 1988, Atlantic Records 40th Anniversary Celebration, but was not performed during the event.

In a contemporary review for the Coda album, Kurt Loder of Rolling Stone found the Coda version of "I Can't Quit You Baby", "tossed off a sound check [in 1970]", "perfectly captures the bluesmania of the period, complete with a classically overwrought guitar solo."

=== Personnel ===
According to Jean-Michel Guesdon and Philippe Margotin:

- Robert Plant – vocals
- Jimmy Page – guitars
- John Paul Jones – bass
- John Bonham – drums

== Recognition and influence ==
"I Can't Quit You Baby" is a blues standard that has been recorded by more than 30 artists. Rush's original Cobra single was inducted into the Blues Foundation Hall of Fame in 1994 that noted "a Willie Dixon production revealing Rush as an extraordinary talent with an impassioned approach."

== See also ==
- List of Led Zeppelin songs written or inspired by others

== Bibliography ==
- Guesdon, Jean-Michel; Margotin, Philippe (2018). Led Zeppelin All the Songs: The Story Behind Every Track. Running Press. ISBN 978-0-316-448-67-3.
