= Whole Lotta Love =

1969 single by Led Zeppelin

- French single picture sleeve

Single by Led Zeppelin

from the album Led Zeppelin II
- B-side: "Living Loving Maid (She's Just a Woman)"
- Released: 7 November 1969
- Recorded: 14–19 April 1969, 28–30 April 1969
- Studio: Olympic, London; A&M, Hollywood
- Genre: Hard rock; heavy metal; blues rock
- Length: 5:33 (Album version); 3:46 (US 7-inch version)
- Label: Atlantic
- Songwriters: John Bonham; Willie Dixon; John Paul Jones; Jimmy Page; Robert Plant
- Producer: Jimmy Page

Led Zeppelin singles chronology
"Good Times Bad Times" (1969)	"Whole Lotta Love" (1969)	"Immigrant Song" (1970)

"Whole Lotta Love" is a song by the English rock band Led Zeppelin. It is the opening track on the band's second album, Led Zeppelin II, and was released as a single in 1969 in several countries; as with other Led Zeppelin songs, no single was released in the United Kingdom. In the United States, it became their first hit and was certified gold. Parts of the song's lyrics were adapted from Willie Dixon's "You Need Love", recorded by Muddy Waters in 1962; originally uncredited to Dixon, a lawsuit in 1985 was settled with a payment to Dixon and credit on subsequent releases.

In 2004, the song was ranked number 75 on Rolling Stone magazine's list of the 500 Greatest Songs of All Time, and in March 2005, Q placed "Whole Lotta Love" at number three in its list of the 100 Greatest Guitar Tracks. It was placed 11 on a similar list by Rolling Stone. In 2009 it was named the third greatest hard rock song of all time by VH1. In 2014, listeners to BBC Radio 2 voted "Whole Lotta Love" as containing the greatest guitar riff of all time.

== Composition and recording ==
"Whole Lotta Love"
Sample with guitar riff

Jimmy Page came up with the guitar riff for "Whole Lotta Love" in the summer of 1968, on his houseboat on the River Thames at Pangbourne, Berkshire, England. However, John Paul Jones stated that it probably was developed from a live improvisation during Yardbirds' performances of "Dazed and Confused". Page denied that the song originated onstage and that he had the riff and the rest took it from there. The chugging riff sounds like twin guitars because Page is playing two guitar strings in unison, while bending one of them to slightly change the pitch. At the same time, John Paul Jones is using the same technique on bass guitar, doubling the guitar part in a lower octave. Page recorded his part while playing through a solid-state amplifier.

Notation for the song indicates the key of E major and a tempo of 92 beats per minute in a compound AABA form.

During the two day mix of the Led Zeppelin II album, audio engineer Eddie Kramer discovered what he thought was some magnetic tape bleedthrough on Plant's vocals on the "Whole Lotta Love" track, which could not be removed, so he put some echo on it, and Page liked the sound. Page also employed a backwards echo production technique. Years later, engineer J. J. Blair analyzed the multi-track tape and found that the second guitar track contained traces of an earlier vocal track by Plant caused by microphonic induction of the guitar pickup. This thin-sounding vocal preceded the main vocal track in a manner similar to bleedthrough.

== Personnel ==
According to Jean-Michel Guesdon and Philippe Margotin:

- Robert Plant – vocals, tambourine
- Jimmy Page – guitars, theremin, backing vocals
- John Paul Jones – bass guitar, bongos, backing vocals, keyboards
- John Bonham – drums, congas, maracas

== Release ==
On 7 November 1969, "Whole Lotta Love" was released as a single in several countries, with "Living Loving Maid (She's Just a Woman)" as the B-side. In the US, Atlantic provided an edited 3:12 version as the flipside for radio stations. Billboard described the single as a "powerful, commercial swinger that should have no trouble putting [Led Zeppelin] up the Hot 100."Cash Box described it as "a mixture of rock and blues with special production touches and a rousing lead vocal performance." In the UK, Atlantic Records expected to issue an edited version, and pressed initial copies for release on 5 December 1969, but this was cancelled by request of manager Peter Grant.

== Similarities to "You Need Love" ==
In 1962, American singer-songwriter Muddy Waters recorded a blues vocal, "You Need Love", for Chess Records. As he had done with "You Shook Me", Waters overdubbed vocals on an instrumental track previously recorded by blues guitarist Earl Hooker and his band. Willie Dixon wrote the lyrics, which Dixon biographer Mitsutoshi Inaba describes as being "about the necessity of love":

You've got yearnin' and I got burnin'
Baby you look so, ho, sweet and cunnin'
Baby way down inside, woman you need love
Woman you need love, you've got to have some love
I'm gon' give you some love, I know you need love

In 1966, the British band Small Faces recorded the song as "You Need Loving" for their eponymous debut Decca album. According to Steve Marriott, the group's vocalist and guitarist, Page and Plant attended several Small Faces gigs, where they expressed their interest in the song. Plant's phrasing is particularly similar to that of Marriott's, who added "he [Plant] sang it the same, phrased it the same, even the stops at the end were the same". Similarities with "You Need Love" led to a lawsuit against Led Zeppelin in 1985, settled out of court in favour of Dixon for an undisclosed amount. On subsequent releases, Dixon's name is included on the credits for "Whole Lotta Love". Plant explained in an interview with Musician:

Page's riff was Page's riff. It was there before anything else. I just thought, 'well, what am I going to sing?' That was it, a nick. Now happily paid for. At the time, there was a lot of conversation about what to do. It was decided that it was so far away in time and influence that ... well, you only get caught when you're successful. That's the game.

== Accolades ==
Accolades
Publication	Country	Accolade	Year	Rank
Spin	US	"100 Greatest Singles of All Time"	1989	39
Rock and Roll Hall of Fame	US	"The Rock and Roll Hall of Fame's 500 Songs that Shaped Rock and Roll"	1994	*
Classic Rock	UK	"Ten of the Best Songs Ever!.. (Bubbling under)"	1999	30
Rolling Stone	US	"The 500 Greatest Songs of All Time"	2003	75
Q	UK	"100 Greatest Guitar Tracks Ever"	2005	3
Toby Creswell	Australia	"1001 Songs: the Great Songs of All Time"	2005	*
Grammy Awards	US	"Grammy Hall of Fame Award"	2007	*
Rolling Stone	US	"100 Greatest Guitar Songs of All Time"	2008	11
VH1	US	"The 100 Greatest Rock Songs of All Time"	2009	46
VH1	US	"VH1 Greatest Hard Rock Songs"	2009	3
BBC Radio 2	UK	"Radio 2's Top 100 Greatest Guitar Riffs"	2014	1
Rolling Stone	US	"The 500 Greatest Songs of All Time"	2021	128

(*) designates unordered lists.

== Charts ==
The single entered the Billboard Hot 100 chart on 22 November 1969. It remained on the chart for 15 weeks, peaking at number four and becoming the band's only top-10 single in the US.

=== Original release ===
Chart (1969–1970)	Peak position
Australia (Go-Set National Top 40)	1
Australia (Kent Music Report)	1
Austria (Ö3 Austria Top 40)	3
Belgium (Ultratop 50 Flanders)	2
Canada Top Singles (RPM)	2
Denmark (Tipparaden)	2
Finland (Suomen virallinen lista)	7
Netherlands (Dutch Top 40)	4
Netherlands (Single Top 100)	5
New Zealand (RIANZ)	4
South Africa (Springbok Radio)	6
Spanish Singles Chart	4
Sweden (Tio i Topp)	9
Switzerland (Schweizer Hitparade)	5
US Billboard Hot 100	4
US Cash Box	2
US Record World	4
West Germany (GfK)	1

Chart (1997)	Peak position
Australia (ARIA)	52
Scottish Singles Sales (Official Charts)	15
UK Singles (Official Charts)	21
UK Rock & Metal (Official Charts)	1

=== Single (digital download) ===
Year	Chart	Peak position
2007	Canada (Hot Canadian Digital Singles)	49
2007	Switzerland (Schweizer Hitparade)	57
2007	UK Singles (Official Charts)	64
2010	Belgium (Ultratop 30 Back Catalogue Singles Wallonia)	18
2012	Belgium (Ultratop 50 Back Catalogue Singles Flanders)	43
2013	France (SNEP)	52
2014	France (SNEP)	151

Note: The official UK Singles Chart incorporated legal downloads as of 17 April 2005.

=== Year-end charts ===
Chart (1970)	Position
Australia (Go-Set Top 40)	18
Australia (Kent Music Report)	11
Austria (Ö3 Austria Top 40)	10
Belgium (Ultratop 50 Flanders)	65
Canada Top Singles (RPM)	23
Netherlands (Dutch Top 40)	28
Netherlands (Single Top 100)	27
US Cash Box	54
West Germany (Official German Charts)	17

== Certifications ==
Region	Certification	Certified units/sales
Germany	—	400,000
Italy (FIMI)	Platinum	50,000^{‡}
Spain (Promusicae)	Platinum	60,000^{‡}
United Kingdom (BPI)	Platinum	600,000^{‡}
United States (RIAA)	Gold	1,000,000^{^}
^{^} Shipments figures based on certification alone.^{‡} Sales+streaming figures based on certification alone.

== Performances ==
Led Zeppelin first performed "Whole Lotta Love" on 26 April 1969. Other live versions were released officially:

- The Song Remains the Same (28 September 1976, from a 1973 concert and movie soundtrack)
- Led Zeppelin BBC Sessions (11 November 1997, from a 1971 concert)
- How the West Was Won (27 May 2003, from a 1972 concert)
- Led Zeppelin DVD (2003, from a 1979 and a 1970 concert)

"Whole Lotta Love" was the last song Led Zeppelin played live. It was, however, performed again at the band's reunions at Live Aid in 1985 (with drummers Phil Collins and Tony Thompson), at the Atlantic Records 40th Anniversary concert in 1988, and at the Ahmet Ertegun Tribute Concert at the O2 Arena, London, on 10 December 2007 (both with drummer Jason Bonham).

In 2008, a reworked version by Jimmy Page on guitar, with Leona Lewis on vocals, was performed in the "London 2012" presentation during the closing ceremony of the 2008 Olympic Games in Beijing. Both Lewis and the organisers requested that some of the lyrics be changed, notably "I'm gonna give you every inch of my love". Lewis felt that the line made little sense coming from a female singer.

== Cover versions ==
"Whole Lotta Love" has been recorded by several artists. Versions that reached the record charts include:

- 1970 – CCS (or C.C.S.) recorded a mainly instrumental rendition with a flute playing the melody. Billboard described their version as a "blockbuster instrumental treatment of the Led Zeppelin hit", while Nick Coleman of The Independent thought that the cover "succeeded in ameliorating the tune's sexual specificity without stripping it of its rutty throb". Released as a single on the RAK label, it reached number 13 on the UK singles chart in November 1970; number 26 in Belgium (Flanders); number 37 on the RPM 100 Singles in Canada; number 58 on the US Billboard Hot 100; and number 58 on the US Cash Box Top 100 Singles. The UK music variety television programme Top of the Pops used brief versions by CCS members and others as its intro theme music at different times over the years.
- 1971 – King Curtis and the Kingpins recorded an instrumental version with the melody line performed on saxophone. Atco Records released it as a single in the US, where it reached number 64 on the Hot 100 and number 43 on the R&B chart. A live version, recorded at the Fillmore West, is included on Curtis' 1971 live album Live at Fillmore West.
- 1975 – Tina Turner on her 1975 album Acid Queen. Released by United Artists Records, her version reached number 61 on the Billboard R&B chart and number 45 on the Record World R&B chart.
- 1996 – British band Goldbug, including a sample of "Asteroid" (the Pearl & Dean advertising music). It reached number three in the UK singles chart and number one on the Indie chart. number 24 in Ireland, and number 9 in the Netherlands. In 2000, band member Richard Walmsley sued his former label Acid Jazz over unpaid royalties relating to the song. Walmsley received thousands of pounds following the battle.

== See also ==
- List of number-one singles in Australia during the 1970s
- List of number-one hits of 1970 (Germany)
- List of Led Zeppelin songs written or inspired by others

== Bibliography ==
- Guesdon, Jean-Michel; Margotin, Philippe (2018). Led Zeppelin All the Songs: The Story Behind Every Track. Running Press. ISBN 978-0-316-448-67-3.
- Lewis, Dave (1990). Led Zeppelin: A Celebration. Omnibus Press. ISBN 978-0-711-92416-1. Archived from the original on 25 October 2020.
