= Rock festival =

Multiday open-air rock concert

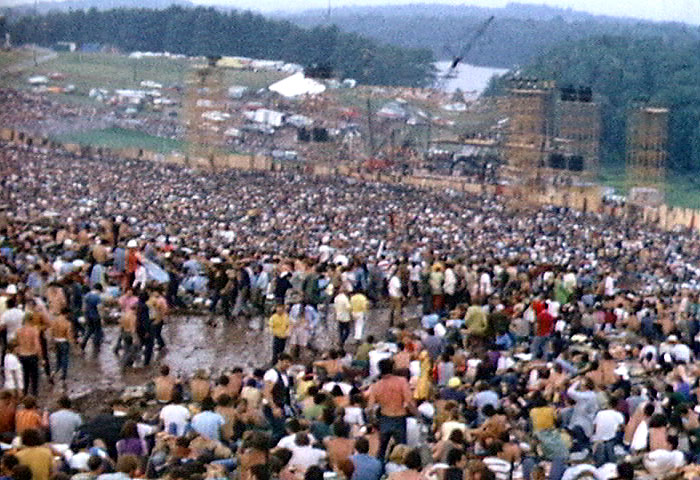
Woodstock Rock Festival (1969)

A rock festival is an open-air rock concert featuring many different performers, typically spread over two or three days and having a campsite and other amenities and forms of entertainment provided at the venue. Some festivals are singular events, while others recur annually in the same location. Occasionally, a festival will focus on a particular genre (e.g., folk, heavy metal, world music), but many attempt to bring together a diverse lineup to showcase a broad array of popular music trends.

== History ==
Initially, some of the earliest rock festivals were built on the foundation of pre-existing jazz and blues festivals, but quickly evolved to reflect the rapidly changing musical tastes of the time. For example, the United Kingdom's National Jazz Festival was launched in Richmond from 26 to 27 August 1961. The first three of these annual outdoor festivals featured only jazz music, but by the fourth "Jazz & Blues Festival" in 1964, a shift had begun that incorporated some blues and pop artists into the lineup. In 1965, for the first time the event included more blues, pop and rock acts than jazz, and by 1966, when the event moved to the town of Windsor, the rock and pop acts clearly dominated the jazz artists.

A similar, though more rapid, evolution occurred with Jazz Bilzen, a solely jazz festival that was inaugurated in 1965 in the Belgian city of Bilzen. The 1966 festival still featured mostly jazz acts. However, by the time of the third festival from 25 to 27 August 1967, rock and pop acts had edged out most of the jazz bands and become the main attraction.

In the United States, rock festivals seemed to spring up with a more self-defined musical identity. Preceded by several precursor events in the San Francisco area, the first two rock festivals in the US were staged in northern California on consecutive weekends in the summer of 1967: the KFRC Fantasy Fair & Magic Mountain Music Festival on Mount Tamalpais (10–11 June) and the Monterey International Pop Festival (16–17 June).

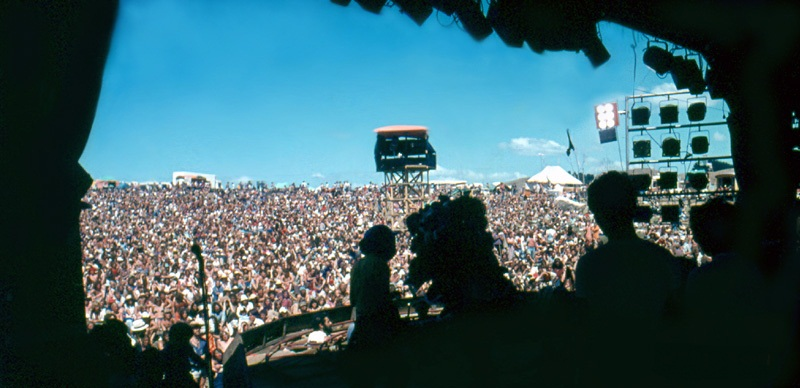
The Nambassa Festival in New Zealand

The concept caught fire and spread quickly as rock festivals took on a unique identity and attracted significant media attention around the world. By 1969, promoters were staging dozens of them. According to Bill Mankin, in their dawning age rock festivals were important socio-cultural milestones: "... it would not be an exaggeration to say that, over a few short years, rock festivals played a unique, significant – and underappreciated – role in fueling the countercultural shift that swept not only America but many other countries [during the 1960s]. It seems fitting... that one of the most enduring labels for the entire generation of that era was derived from a rock festival: the 'Woodstock Generation'."

Reflecting their musical diversity and the then-common term 'pop music', for the first few years, particularly in the US, many rock festivals were called 'pop festivals'. This also served to distinguish them among the ticket-buying public from other, pre-existing types of music festivals such as jazz and folk festivals. By the end of 1972, the term 'pop festival' had virtually disappeared as festival promoters adopted more creative, unique and location-specific names to identify and advertise their events. While it was still in vogue, however, over-zealous promoters eager to capitalize on the festival concept made the most of it, with some using the term "Pop Festival" or "Rock Festival" to advertise events held on a single day or evening, often indoors, and featuring only a handful of acts.

Today, rock festivals are usually open-air concerts spread out over two or more days and many of the annual events are sponsored by the same organization.

== Features ==
Production and financing

Several of the early rock festival organizers of the 1960s such as Tom Rounds, Alex Cooley and Michael Lang helped create the blueprint for large-scale rock festivals in the United States, as well promoters such as Wally Hope in the United Kingdom. In various countries, the organizers of rock festivals have faced legal action from authorities, in part because such festivals have attracted large counterculture elements. In 1972, Mar Y Sol Pop Festival in Manatí, Puerto Rico attracted an estimated 30–35,000 people, and an arrest warrant was issued for promoter Alex Cooley, who avoided arrest by leaving the island before the festival was over. British Free Festival organizers Ubi Dwyer and Sid Rawle were imprisoned for attempting to promote a 1975 Windsor Festival. The British police would later outright attack free festival attendees at the 1985 Battle of the Beanfield.

Festivals may require millions of USD to be organized, with the money often gathered through fundraising and angel investors.

Stages and sound systems

While rock concerts typically feature a small lineup of rock bands playing a single stage, rock festivals often grow large enough to require several stages or venues with live bands playing concurrently. As rock music has increasingly been fused with other genres, sometimes stages will be devoted to a specific genre and may in turn become known and large enough to be seen as festivals themselves, such as was The Glade at the famous Glastonbury Festival in England.

Advances in sound reinforcement systems beginning in the 1960s enabled larger and larger rock festival audiences to hear the performers' music with much better clarity and volume. The best example was the pioneering work of Bill Hanley, known as the "father of festival sound", who provided the sound systems for numerous rock festivals including Woodstock. Other examples included the Wall of Sound invented in the 1970s to allow the Grateful Dead to play to larger audiences.

Camping and crowd control

Many festivals offer camping, either because lodging in the area is insufficient to support the crowd, or to allow easy multi-day access to the festival's features. Festival planning and logistics are frequently a focus of the media, some festivals such as the heavily commercialized Woodstock 1999 were crowd control disasters, with insufficient water and other resources provided to audiences. Many early rock festivals successfully relied on volunteers for crowd control, for example individuals like Wavy Gravy and biker groups such as the Hells Angels and Grim Reapers Motorcycle Club. Gravy in particular called his security group the "Please Force," a reference to their non-intrusive tactics at keeping order, e.g., "Please don't do that, please do this instead". When asked by the press — who were the first to inform him that he and the rest of his commune were handling security — what kind of tools he intended to use to maintain order at Woodstock in 1969, his response was "Cream pies and seltzer bottles." Other rock festivals hire private security or local police departments for crowd control, with varying degrees of success.

== Historic rock festivals ==
=== 1950s–1960s ===
Sample of rock festivals of historical significance, with an emphasis on multiple-day, outdoor events
| Name | Years | Location | Notes |
|---|---|---|---|
| Historic jazz festivals | 1950s–1960s | US/Europe | Some early jazz festivals and blues festivals were showcases for rock and roll artists, primarily in the US and the UK |
| Swamp Pop Music Festival | 1950s–1960s | Louisiana, U.S. | "Swamp pop" is a distinctive style of music that began in the 1950s when Louisiana teenagers first heard new rock-n-roll idols like Chuck Berry, Bo Diddley and Fats Domino on the radio. The Festival's most popular period was between 1958 and 1964, when nearly two dozen swamp pop recordings reached the national charts. |
| Newport Jazz Festival | 1954–present | Newport, Rhode Island, U.S. | It was established in 1954 by socialite Elaine Lorillard. While initially focused on acoustic jazz, the festival's 1969 program was an experiment in fusing jazz, soul and rock music for the first time. The 1969 lineup included Jeff Beck, Blood, Sweat & Tears, Ten Years After, Jethro Tull, Miles Davis, Dave Brubeck, John Mayall and Sly & the Family Stone, James Brown, B. B. King and Led Zeppelin. |
| Beaulieu Jazz Festival | 1956–1961 | Beaulieu, Hampshire, UK | Lord Montagu of Beaulieu holds an annual traditional and modern jazz festival in the ground of Beaulieu estate, in the New Forest. Attracts beats and jazz eccentrics, called 'ravers', and both pop and jazz music. |
| National Jazz and Blues Festival | 1961–1980s | United Kingdom | Though dedicated mostly to jazz and blues in the beginning, this annual festival has become a showcase for progressive rock as well, featuring groups such as the psychedelic rock group Cream. |
| Reading and Leeds Festivals | 1961–present | England | The line-up settled into a pattern of progressive rock, blues and hard rock during the early and mid 1970s then became the first music festival to embrace punk rock and new wave in the late 1970s. |
| Festival Omladina | 1961–1990; 2012– present | Subotica, Serbia (Yugoslavia 1961–1990) | Established in Subotica in 1961, Festival Omladina (Youth Festival) was originally a competition of young composers of popular music. Their compositions were initially performed by pop singers, but soon the performers of competing compositions became rock bands. In 1970s, the non-competitive part, featuring established rock acts, was added to the program, and in the 1980s the festival became a competition of young rock bands. During the years, some of the most notable acts of the Yugoslav pop and rock scene performed on the festival. |
| Big Sur Folk Festival | 1964–1971 | Big Sur, California | Esalen Institute with Joan Baez and Nancy Carlen. |
| Parada ritma / Vatromet ritma | 1964–1965 | Yugoslavia | Parada ritma (Parade of Rhythm) / Vatromet ritma (Fireworks of Rhythm) was a series of concerts featuring Yugoslav rock bands, held in Belgrade and Novi Sad during 1964 and 1965. The first edition is considered the first rock festival in Yugoslavia and arguably the first rock festival in a communist country. |
| Vilar de Mouros Festival | 1965–1968; 1971; 1982; 1996; 1999–2006; 2014; 2016–2019; 2022–present | Portugal | Usually recognized in Portugal as the precursor of all the music festivals, the Vilar de Mouros Festival became a cultural icon, counting with the first edition in 1965. In that year it was organized a folk festival that by the large impact it had, reached immortalization in 1971, most of all because of rock music nature and the presence of bands with great international projection. Held with long interregnums and therefore named as the festival of several generations, it has been creating a certain eclecticism, which attracts musical styles that lead people with the most different musical tastes. |
| Jazz Bilzen | 1965–1981 | Bilzen, Belgium | First festival on the continent where jazz and pop music were brought together. Sometimes called the "mother of all (European) festivals," Bilzen started out jazz, but soon blues, folk, rock and soul, later even punk and new wave, came to be incorporated as well. |
| Gitarijada (Belgrade) | 1966–1967 | Belgrade, Yugoslavia | Gitarijada (Guitar Fest) was a festival held in Belgrade, featuring performances of Yugoslav rock bands. The festival was one of early rock festivals in Yugoslavia and considered one of the milestones in the history of Yugoslav rock music. The first edition of the festival was attended by more than 15,000 and the second by more than 13,000 spectators. |
| Gitarijada (Zaječar) | 1966–present | Zaječar, Serbia (Yugoslavia 1966— '91) | Established in Zaječar in 1966, Gitarijada (Guitar Fest) is one of the longest lasting festivals in Serbia and in South Eastern Europe and the largest festival of young and unaffirmed bands in South Eastern Europe. Currently, it consists of competitive part and of non-competitive part featuring well-known Serbian and foreign acts. |
| Trips Festival | 1966 | San Francisco, California, U.S. | The Trips Festival on 21–23 January 1966 was the most attended and advertised of the early Acid Tests events, which were started in late 1965. Ten thousand people attended this sold-out event, with a thousand more turned away each night. On Saturday 22 January, Grateful Dead and Big Brother and the Holding Company came on stage, and 6,000 people arrived to imbibe punch spiked with LSD and to witness one of the first fully developed light shows of the era. Grateful Dead sound engineer Ken Babbs notably created a new sound system for the festival, building sound amplifiers that didn't distort when turned up to high sound levels. The Trips Festival was followed by the 6 October 1966 Love Pageant Rally, held in San Francisco to protest the banning of LSD. |
| Mantra-Rock Dance | 1967 | California, U.S. | Occurring several weeks after the Human Be-In event on 14 January 1967, the 29 January Mantra-Rock Dance was a precursor event to the large outdoor festivals that debuted in the summer of 1967. The dance was held in San Francisco's Avalon Ballroom, featured three bands including Grateful Dead, and was organized by followers of the International Society for Krishna Consciousness to introduce its founder to a wider American audience. |
| Fantasy Fair and Magic Mountain; Music Festival | 1967 | Marin County, California, U.S. | Over 36,000 people attended the two-day concert and fair on 10 and 11 June, that was the first of a series of San Francisco area cultural events known as the Summer of Love. Influenced by the popular Renaissance Pleasure Faire, which was founded in Irwindale, California in 1963 as the first large renaissance fair. Fantasy Fair became a prototype for large scale multi-act outdoor rock music events now known as rock festivals. |
| Monterey Pop Festival | 1967 | Monterey, California, U.S. | Major one-time cultural event on 16–18 June, with genres including rock, pop and folk, including blues-rock, folk rock, hard rock and psychedelic rock styles. |
| Schaefer Music Festival | 1967–1976 | New York City, U.S. | First held in the summer of 1966 in Central Park as the small event the Rheingold Central Park Music Festival, the first lineup in July 1967 with the new name included only The Young Rascals; The Jimi Hendrix Experience; and Len Chandler. The lineup afterwards grew exponentially, with diverse genres related to blues and pop. On 21 July 1969 Led Zeppelin were the headliners of the Schaefer Music Festival at New York City's Wollman Rink, along with B.B. King. |
| 1968 Pop & Underground Festival | 1968 | Hallandale, Florida, U.S. | May 18–19, 1968. An estimated 25,000 people attended the May event, which was promoted by Richard O'Barry and Michael Lang, later famous as promoter of Woodstock. This event would later come to be known colloquially as the "Miami Pop Festival", though it was unrelated to the December 1968 "Miami Pop Festival". The Jimi Hendrix Experience was one of the featured artists. After Sunday's concert was rained out, it inspired Hendrix to write "Rainy Day, Dream Away." |
| Northern California Folk Rock Festival I | 1968 | San Jose, California, U.S. | 18–19 May 1968. The first festival featured notable bands such as Jefferson Airplane, The Doors, Janis Joplin, The Youngbloods, The Electric Flag, Kaleidoscope, Taj Mahal, etc. |
| Summerfest | 1968–present | Milwaukee, Wisconsin, U.S. | Billed as "The World's Largest Music Festival" by the Guinness World Records since 1999, this 11-day event is held between late June and early July, encompassing all genres of musical styles. |
| Newport Pop Festival | 1968–1969 | Costa Mesa, California, U.S. | 3–4 August 1968. The first music concert ever to have more than 100,000 paid attendees. Also held the following year. |
| Isle of Wight Festival | 1968–1970; 2002– present | Isle of Wight, England | 31 August and 1 September 1968. Progressive rock counterculture event. The 1970 event was by far the largest of the early ones, and led, in 1971, to Parliament passing the "Isle of Wight Act" preventing gatherings of more than 5,000 people on the island without a special license. |
| Sky River Rock Festival | 1968–1970 | near Sultan, Washington, U.S. | First held 31 Aug – 2 September 1968 (as well as 30 Aug – 1 September 1969; 28 Aug-Sep...1970), it was the first multi-day outdoor hippie rock festival at an undeveloped site. Included the Lighter Than Air Fair. |
| Internationale Essener Songtage | 1968 | Essen, West Germany | September 1968. Krautrock arose at this first major, weeklong, indoors German rock festival. |
| Hyde Park Free Concerts | 1968–1976 | Hyde Park, London | UK—single-day events |
| San Francisco Pop Festival | 1968 | Pleasanton, California, U.S. | Held Saturday 26 October & Sunday 27 October 1968. The groups playing at the festival included The Animals, Creedence Clearwater Revival, etc. |
| Los Angeles Pop Festival | 1968 | Los Angeles, California, U.S. | The dates were 22 and 23 December 1968, with groups such as Blue Cheer, The Box Tops, Canned Heat, etc. |
| Miami Pop Festival | 1968 | Hallandale, Florida, U.S. | 28–30 December 1968. This event drew an estimated 100,000 people, was the first major rock festival on America's east coast, and was produced by Tom Rounds, who had previously produced the seminal Fantasy Fair and Magic Mountain Music Festival. Performers included Chuck Berry, Joe Tex, Marvin Gaye, Flatt and Scruggs, The Turtles, Procol Harum, The Amboy Dukes, Steppenwolf, and the Paul Butterfield Blues Band. |
| Palm Springs Pop Festival | 1969 | Palm Springs, California, U.S. | Held 1–2 April 1969, it was actually two separate one day events. The first was at the Sunair Drive-in in Cathedral City and was called the Palm Springs Pop Festival. Lee Michaels, Procol Harum and John Mayall were the closing acts that day. Day 2 was called the San Andreas Boogie held at the LA Angels summer training baseball field. There was a prediction of an earthquake that day (didn't happen). Buddy Miles Band, Savoy Brown and Canned Heat were the closing acts. The situation went sour when policing efforts militarized the event and there were riots, and a young concert-goer was shot and killed by a nearby store clerk. Concert permits were not issued in Palm Springs afterwards for many years. |
| Big Rock Pow-Wow | 1969 | West Hollywood, Florida, U.S. | Took place on Friday, Saturday, and Sunday, 23, 24 and 25 May 1969, at the Hollywood Seminole Indian Reservation in West Hollywood, Florida. Artists who performed at the festival included Grateful Dead, Johnny Winter, Rhinoceros, Muddy Waters, the Youngbloods, with Timothy Leary speaking from the stage. |
| Northern California Folk-Rock Festival II | 1969 | San Jose, California, U.S. | 23–25 May, the festival featured The Jimi Hendrix Experience, Jefferson Airplane, etc. |
| First Annual Detroit Rock & Roll Revival | 1969 | Detroit, Michigan, U.S. | 30–31 May 1969, held at the Michigan State Fairgrounds. Local artists such as Sun Ra played, as well as Chuck Berry, MC5 and The Stooges. |
| Newport 69 Pop Festival | 1969 | Northridge, Los Angeles, U.S. | 20–22 June 1969 |
| Toronto Pop Festival | 1969 | Toronto, Canada | 21–22 June 1969. Toronto Pop was the first large music festival ever held in Canada. Held at Varsity Stadium (a football stadium on the grounds of the University of Toronto) over two days of 21 and 22 June 1969, crowds averaged 35–40,000 each day. Scheduled performers included Saturday, 21 June - Eric Anderson, Al Kooper, The Band, Bonzo Dog Band, Johnny Winter, Velvet Underground and Sly & the Family Stone. Sunday, 22 June - Ronnie Hawkins, Chuck Berry, Kensington Market, Tiny Tim, Nucleus, Dr. John & the Night Tripper, Blood, Sweat & Tears and Steppenwolf |
| Bath Festival of Blues | 1969 | Somerset, England | Saturday 28 June 1969. Developed by Freddy Bannister and Wendy Bannister, it had a lineup of British blues bands, including Fleetwood Mac (the headliners), John Mayall's Bluesbreakers, Ten Years After, Led Zeppelin, Pink Floyd, Frank Zappa & The Mothers of Invention, Country Joe McDonald, Santana, Moody Blues, Fairport Convention, Jefferson Airplane, Dr. John, The Byrds, Canned Heat, The Nice, Chicken Shack, Jon Hiseman's Colosseum, Mick Abrahams' Blodwyn Pig amongst others. |
| Denver; Pop Festival | 1969 | Denver, Colorado, U.S. | Three-day music festival promoted by rock promoter Barry Fey (Feyline) on 27 – 29 June 1969 which was largely overshadowed by Woodstock two months later. With the full support and local resources of Denver, the peak attendance was estimated at 50,000. |
| Harlem Cultural Festival | 1969 | Harlem, New York, U.S. | 29 June – 24 August 1969. The Harlem Cultural Festival (also known as Black Woodstock) was a series of music concerts held in Harlem, Manhattan, New York City during the summer of 1969 to celebrate African American music and culture and to promote the continued politics of black pride. Notable participants included Nina Simone, B.B. King, Sly and the Family Stone, Chuck Jackson, Abbey Lincoln & Max Roach, the 5th Dimension, Gladys Knight & the Pips, Stevie Wonder, Mahalia Jackson, and Moms Mabley, among many others. |
| Mississippi River Festival | 1969–1980 | Edwardsville, Illinois, U.S. | MRF consisted of a variety of popular rock, folk, bluegrass, and classical music performers. The more popular groups, such as The Who, Yes, Chicago, Eagles, and Grateful Dead shows were heavily attended. Some shows attracting crowds in excess of 30,000. In July 1969, Bob Dylan did a short surprise gig, together with The Band. It was his first performance since his notorious motorcycle accident in 1966. |
| Atlanta International Pop Festival I | 1969 | Hampton, Georgia, U.S. | The first Atlanta festival was held 4–5 July 1969, at the Atlanta International Raceway in Hampton, Georgia, twenty miles south of Atlanta, and drew a crowd of around 100,000. Performers included Led Zeppelin, Janis Joplin, Creedence Clearwater Revival, Joe Cocker, Canned Heat, and Chicago Transit Authority. |
| The Stones in the Park | 1969 | Hyde Park, London | Free outdoor concert by The Rolling Stones held on 5 July 1969, also featuring Third Ear Band, King Crimson, Screw, Alexis Korner's New Church, Family and The Battered Ornaments, in front of a crowd estimated at between 250,000 and 500,000 fans. |
| Laurel Pop Festival | 1969 | Laurel, Maryland, U.S. | A music festival held at the Laurel Race Course in Laurel, MD on 11–12 July 1969. The festival featured Buddy Guy, Al Kooper, Jethro Tull, Johnny Winter, Edwin Hawkins and Led Zeppelin (on 11 July); and Jeff Beck, Ten Years After, Sly and the Family Stone, The Mothers of Invention, Savoy Brown and Guess Who (on 12 July). |
| Summer Pop Festival | 1969 | Philadelphia, United States | The July 12 festival featured Led Zeppelin, along with Johnny Winter, Jethro Tull and Buddy Guy at the Spectrum. |
| Midwest Rock Festival | 1969 | Milwaukee, Wisconsin, U.S. | A music festival held at the State Fair Park on the 25–27 July 1969. The festival featured Led Zeppelin, Buffy Sainte-Marie, The First Edition, Sweetwater, Pacific Gas & Electric, SRC and Shag (25 July); Blind Faith, etc. |
| Seattle; Pop Festival | 1969 | Woodinville, Washington, U.S. | Twenty-six musicians and groups performed at the festival, including Led Zeppelin, Chuck Berry, Black Snake, Tim Buckley, The Byrds, Chicago Transit Authority, Bo Diddley, The Doors, etc. 25–27 July. |
| Singer Bowl Music Festival | 1969 | New York City, U.S. | The Singer Bowl Music Festival on 30 August featured Led Zeppelin. |
| Atlantic City Pop Festival | 1969 | Atlantic City, New Jersey, U.S. | took place in 1969 on 1, 2 and 3 August at the Atlantic City race track, two weeks before Woodstock Festival. Attended by some 100,000+ people, the festival featured the following performers: Creedence Clearwater Revival, Santana, etc. |
| Woodstock | 1969 | Bethel, New York, U.S. | This historically and culturally notable festival served as a defining moment for baby boomers. Performers included Joe Cocker, Jimi Hendrix, Jefferson Airplane, Country Joe and The Fish, Sly & The Family Stone, Richie Havens, Janis Joplin, The Band, The Who, Creedence Clearwater Revival, and Santana among many others, with genres such as acoustic music, progressive rock, and psychedelic rock. 15–18 August, audience of over 400,000 young people. |
| Vancouver; Pop Festival | 1969 | Squamish, British Columbia, Canada | Canadian rock festival held on 22, 23 and 24 August 1969, Paradise Valley Resort, Squamish. It was produced by Candi Promotions. The groups playing at the festival included The Chambers Brothers, Chicago, Alice Cooper, etc. |
| Texas International Pop Festival | 1969 | Lewisville, Texas, U.S. | It occurred two weeks after Woodstock. The site for the event was the newly opened Dallas International Motor Speedway. The festival was the brainchild of Angus G. Wynne III, son of Angus G. Wynne, the founder of the Six Flags Over Texas Amusement Park. Artists performing at the festival were: Canned Heat, Chicago, James Cotton, Led Zeppelin, etc. The Merry Pranksters, Ken Kesey's group, was in charge of the free stage and camping area. Attendance at the festival remains unknown, but is estimated between 120,000 and 150,000. |
| New Orleans Pop Festival | 1969 | Prairieville, Louisiana, U.S. | On 30 August – 1 September at the Louisiana International Speedway, the festival featured 26 bands, including seven veterans of Woodstock which was held two week prior such as Janis Joplin, Grateful Dead, and Jefferson Airplane. Peak attendance was estimated at 35,000. |
| Toronto Rock and Roll Revival | 1969 | Toronto, Ontario, Canada | One-day, twelve-hour music festival held on 13 September 1969. With a number of popular rock & roll acts from the 1950s and 1960s, it also featured an appearance by John Lennon and Yoko Ono, and The Doors. |
| Internationales Essener Pop & Blues Festival | 1969 | Essen, Germany | Three-day music festival held on 9-11 October 1969 in the Grugahalle. With Pink Floyd, Deep Purple, Yes, Fleetwood Mac, The Pretty Things, Tangerine Dream, Taste, The Nice, Free, Muddy Waters etc. |
| Palm Beach Pop Festival | 1969 | Palm Beach, Florida, U.S. | 28–30 November 1969, the festival was held at the Palm Beach International Speedway and featured artists such as Janis Joplin, Iron Butterfly, Johnny Winter, King Crimson, Grand Funk Railroad, The Byrds, Vanilla Fudge, Jefferson Airplane, Steppenwolf and the Rolling Stones. Held only one year. the event met with a number of logistical difficulties, including rain and lack of supplies. The local police also heavily militarized the event, and the promoters were bankrupted. |
| Altamont Free Concert | 1969 | Altamont Speedway, California, U.S. | Genres included rock and folk, including blues-rock, folk rock, jazz fusion, Latin rock, and psychedelic rock styles. Actually a free Rolling Stones gig, it featured, in order of appearance: Santana, Jefferson Airplane, The Flying Burrito Brothers, etc. 6 December 1969. One audience member was stabbed to death by the Hells Angels, who were hired as security for the concert. |
| Miami Rock Festival | 1969 | Pembroke Pines, Florida, U.S. | 27–29 December 1969, held at the Miami-Hollywood Motorsports Park. The lineup included acts such as B.B. King, The Band, Grateful Dead, Motherlode, Santana, Sweetwater, Canned Heat, Vanilla Fudge, and Johnny Winter performed. Police searched fans, making 47 arrests, and a young audience member died after falling from a spotlight tower. |

=== 1970s ===
| Name | Years | Location | Notes |
|---|---|---|---|
| Redwood 70 | 1970 | West Auckland, New Zealand | The first major multi-day music festival held in New Zealand, held on 31 January and 1 February 1970. Headlining act Robin Gibb of the BeeGees was pelted with cans and tomatoes by a disgruntled crowd. |
| Festival of Political Songs | 1970–1990 | East Berlin, East Germany | Generally held in mid to late February, this festival was a major cultural event for the Free German Youth organization, featuring select political music. |
| 2. Essener Pop und Blues Festival | 1970 | Essen, Germany | The second Pop & Blues festival in Essen, held on 24 and 25 April 1970. With the Edgar Broughton Band, Renaissance, The Groundhogs, Black Sabbath, Keef Hartley Band, Hardin & York, Marsha Hunt, Krokodil, Can, The Flock etc. 45 minutes were shown on German TV. |
| Hollywood Music Festival | 1970 | Staffordshire, England | 23 and 24 May 1970, it was notable for the first performance of the Grateful Dead in the UK. This was the first of the major festivals held in the summer of 1970 and part of the festival was to have been filmed by the BBC. |
| The Kickapoo Creek Rock Festival | 1970 | Heyworth, Illinois, U.S. | The Kickapoo Creek Rock Festival was held on Memorial Day Weekend in May 1970 near Heyworth, Illinois. The Grim Reapers provided the festival security. Approximately 60,000 people attended the festival. |
| World Popular Song Festival | 1970–1989 | Japan | With a pop music focus, it was also known as Yamaha Music Festival and unofficially as the "Oriental Eurovision", was an international song contest held from 1970 until 1989. |
| Atlanta International Pop Festival II | 1970 | Byron, Georgia, U.S. | The second and last Atlanta Pop Festival was held 3–5 July 1970, slightly east of Byron, Georgia, 100 miles south of Atlanta, and drew a crowd of over two hundred thousand. Jimi Hendrix was the headliner. |
| Super Concert '70 | 1970 | West Berlin, West Germany | A one-day music festival on 4 September 1970. The festival was headlined by Jimi Hendrix, and was his next to last performance. He appeared on stage once more at the Open Air Love & Peace Festival in Fehmarn, West Germany, on 6 September 1970. |
| Aachen Open Air Pop Festival | 1970 | Aachen, West Germany | The "Soersfestival", as it is most commonly called, was the initiative of three local students. Some 50,000 visitors attended. |
| Piedra Roja | 1970 | Chile | between 10 and 12 October 1970 in the eastern area of Santiago. Among others, the following bands performed in the festival: Aguaturbia, Los Blops, Lágrima Seca and Los Jaivas. |
| Bath Festival of Blues and Progressive Music | 1970 | Shepton Mallet, Somerset, UK | The festival featured a line-up of the top American west coast and British bands of the day, including Santana, The Flock, Led Zeppelin (headlining act), Pink Floyd, etc. |
| Phun City | 1970 | Worthing, Sussex, UK | Featuring alternative rock and rock, it was organised by the UK Underground anarchist Mick Farren, the festival was notable for having no fences and no admission fees. |
| Kralingen Music Festival | 1970 | Rotterdam, Netherlands | Performing bands included The Byrds, T. Rex, Santana, Jefferson Airplane, and the headlining Pink Floyd. Approximately 150.000 attended. |
| Strawberry Fields | 1970 | Bowmanville, Ontario, Canada | Although accounts vary, the audience has been estimated at between 75,000 and 100,000 people. Bands such as Jethro Tull and Alice Cooper performed. |
| Ruisrock | 1970–present | Turku, Finland | Second oldest rock festival in Europe and the oldest in Finland. The all-time attendance record was set in 1971, when there were about 100,000 visitors, with artists such as Canned Heat playing. |
| Pinkpop Festival | 1970–present | Landgraaf, Netherlands | A large, annual pop music festival initially held at Geleen, the Netherlands. Incorporates many genres, and early on was known for focusing on progressive rock. |
| Powder Ridge Rock Festival | 1970 | Middlefield, Connecticut, U.S. | Scheduled for 31 July – 2 August 1970, the event was cancelled at the last minute, though thousands of concert-goers still showed up at the venue. |
| Goose Lake International Music Festival | 1970 | Michigan, U.S. | 7–9 August 1970, the Goose Lake promoters wanted better planning and facilities than Woodstock. The stage was built on a revolving turntable with two performance spaces. At the end of each performance, the stage would rotate 180 degrees, and the next act would begin performing almost immediately. An estimated 200,000 rock music fans attended the festival. The initial attitude of the "young, hip police force" to fans was to "leave them alone", though there were 160 arrests of those leaving after the event, mostly on drug charges. |
| Man-Pop Festival | 1970 | Winnipeg, Manitoba, Canada | Held 29 August 1970, Led Zeppelin was the headlining act at the event. Other artists performing at the festival included The Youngbloods, The Ides of March, Iron Butterfly, Chilliwack, plus local bands, including Dianne Heatherington and The Merry Go Round. |
| Glastonbury Festival | 1970–1971; 1978–present | Pilton, Somerset, UK | In addition to contemporary music, the festival hosts dance, comedy, theatre, circus, cabaret, and other arts. It is organized by Michael Eavis on his own farm land. The first ever opening act was the English progressive rock group Stackridge. |
| Vortex I | 1970 | Oregon, U.S. | A week-long rock festival sponsored by the Portland counterculture community with help from the U.S. state of Oregon. The music at the festival was primarily performed by local acts. It is the only state-sponsored rock festival in United States history. |
| 3. Essener Pop & Blues Festival | 1970 | Essen, Germany | The third and last Pop & Blues festival in the Grugahalle in Essen. It was held on 22-25 October 1970. With Taste, Savoy Brown, Ginger Baker's Air Force, The Gun, Fotheringay, May Blitz, Q65, Brainbox, East of Eden, Tony Williams Lifetime, T. Rex, Supertramp, Alexis Korner, Chicken Shack, Embryo etc. |
| White Concert | 1971 | Monterrey, Mexico | in February 1971 in Monterrey, a collective band called Sierra Madre and a state-of-the-art lights spectacle named "Music and light show" faced repression after a failed attempt to hold a three-day concert, called Concierto Blanco (white concert) inside the State government palace in Monterrey's main square. The violent incidents after the White concert, which were extensively covered by the media, seriously damaged then Nuevo Leon governor Eduardo Elizondo's political career. |
| Festival Buenos Aires Rock | 1971 | Argentina | Major hippie festival held in Argentina. |
| Festival de Ancon | 1971 | Colombia | Major pop festival held in Colombia, held 18 to 20 June |
| Roskilde Festival | 1971–present | Roskilde, Denmark | Denmark's first real music-oriented festival, originally towards counter-culture music such as psychedelic rock. 2013 had more than 180 bands and around 130,000 festival goers. |
| Myponga Pop Festival | 1971 | Myponga, South Australia | Over three days in the summer of 1971. The festival was headlined by heavy metal pioneers Black Sabbath. Other performers included Australian acts Daddy Cool, Spectrum, Fraternity, Billy Thorpe and the Aztecs and Chain. |
| Celebration Of Life | | McCrea, Louisiana, U.S. | An 8-day festival without proper facilities for the 60,000+ attendees. This debacle is the subject of a documentary, McCrea 1971, which can be seen at http://www.mccrea1971.com |
| Bumbershoot | 1971–present | Seattle, Washington, U.S. | One of North America's largest annual international music and arts festivals, held in Seattle, Washington every Labor Day weekend. It features a large amount of rock and experimental artists and genres, which in 1990s included the local grunge genre, and recently has included indie rock. |
| Ilosaarirock | 1971–present | Joensuu, Finland | The second oldest rock festival in Finland still active, and one of the oldest in Europe. Progressive rock bands featuring electronic features frequently perform. |
| Weeley Festival | 1971 | United Kingdom | 27–29 August 1971, Weeley, UK |
| Festival Rock y Ruedas de Avándaro | 1971 | Valle de Bravo, Mexico | 11–12 September 1971, Valle de Bravo, Mexico |
| BOOM Festival | 1971–1978 | Yugoslavia | A rock music festival, held in several cities of Yugoslavia: one editions of the festival was hel in Maribor, three were held in Ljubljana, one in Zagreb, one in Belgrade and two in Novi Sad. The festival featured numerous prominent acts of the former Yugoslav rock scene, and five various artists live albums were recorded on various editions of the festival. |
| Sunbury Pop Festival | 1972–1975 | Australia | 26 January, held at Diggers Rest, Victoria. |
| Erie Canal Soda Pop Festival | 1972 | Bull Island, Griffin, Indiana, U.S. | A crowd estimated at 200,000 to 300,000 attended the concert, four times what the promoters estimated. Food and water were in short supply, and the gathering descended into relative anarchy. After the show was finished, remnants of the crowd burned the main stage. |
| Bickershaw Festival | 1972 | Bickershaw, England | Held in Bickershaw (Wigan, Lancashire), England, between 5 and 7 May 1972. Except for the 1976–79 Deeply Vale Festivals, Bickershaw was the only major north-west multi-day festival with camping. |
| Concert 10/Mt. Pocono Rock Festival | 1972 | Long Pond, Pennsylvania, U.S. | 8 and 9 July 1972. The event attracted an estimated 200,000 people who were met with cold inclement weather, replete with rain and mud. |
| Mar Y Sol Pop Festival | 1972 | Manatí, Puerto Rico | An estimated 30–35,000 people attended the festival. An arrest warrant was issued for promoter Alex Cooley, who avoided arrest by leaving the island before the festival was over. Performers included the Mahavishnu Orchestra, The Faces, Alice Cooper, The Allman Brothers Band, Billy Joel, Cactus, Osibisa, B. B. King, and others. |
| Windsor Free Festival | 1972–1974 | Windsor Great Park, England | A British Free Festival organised by some London commune dwellers, notably Ubi Dwyer and Sid Rawle. The event was brutally suppressed by the police, which led to a public outcry about the tactics involved. In 1975 both Ubi Dwyer and Sid Rawle were imprisoned, for attempting to promote a 1975 Windsor Festival. |
| The Great Ngaruawahia Music Festival | 1973 | New Zealand | the first large outdoor music festival in New Zealand. It was held on a farm at Ngāruawāhia on the Waikato River for three days from 6 to 8 January 1973. |
| Aquarius Festival | 1973 | Australia | A counter-cultural arts and music festival organised by the Australian Union of Students. The first NUAUS festival was held in Sydney ca 1966, while the second, Melbourne, third in Canberra and last (Aquarius) was held in Nimbin, New South Wales in 1973. Estimated turn-up at Nimbin was from 5,000 to 10,000 people. It is often described as Australia's equivalent to the Woodstock Festival and the birthplace for Australia's hippie movement. |
| Day on the Green | 1973–1991 | Oakland, California, U.S. | First held 5 August 1973, it was a recurring concert in Oakland, California presented by promoter Bill Graham and his company Bill Graham Presents. Held at the Oakland Coliseum, these events began in 1973 and continued into the early 1990s. The last Day on the Green overseen by Graham took place the same month as his death in a helicopter crash in 1991. Headliners the first year included bands such as Elvin Bishop, Merry Clayton, while the Grateful Dead appeared the second. |
| Summer Jam at Watkins Glen | 1973 | Watkins Glen, New York, U.S. | Once received the Guinness Book of World Records entry for "Largest audience at a pop festival." An estimated 600,000 rock fans came to the Watkins Glen Grand Prix Raceway outside of Watkins Glen, New York on 28 July 1973, to see the Allman Brothers Band, Grateful Dead and The Band perform. |
| Hurricane Festival | 1973–present | Scheeßel, Germany (West Germany 1973–1990) | In June 1973, the first festival was held in Scheeßel, the place where today's Hurricane takes place. It was called "Es rockt in der Heide" at that time (literally translated: It's rocking in the heath) and was attended by 52,000 people. |
| Stonehenge Free Festival | 1974–1984 | Stonehenge, England | Important free festival that happened during the month of June, and culminating on the summer solstice on 21 June. A celebration of countercultures, with New Age Travellers and the Wallys attending. Hosted bands including Hawkwind, Gong, Doctor and the Medics, Flux of Pink Indians, Thompson Twins, etc. |
| Ashton Court Festival | 1974–2007 | Bristol, England | Held annually in mid-July, starting as a small one-day festival in 1974, the festival grew during succeeding years and was said to be Britain's largest free festival until changes brought on by government legislation resulted in compulsory fees and security fencing being introduced. |
| Knebworth Festival | 1974 | England | |
| Village Fair | 1974–present | Bathurst, Australia | Annual community festival that began in 1974 with increasingly expanded performances such as local indie music acts and Australian headliners. New venue in 2007, and a music festival almost double in size of any previous years. |
| Zaire 74 | 1974 | Kinshasa, Zaire | A three-day live music festival that took place on 22 to 24 September 1974 at the '20 May Stadium' in Kinshasa, Zaire (now Democratic Republic of the Congo). The concert, conceived by South African trumpeter Hugh Masekela and record producer Stewart Levine, the Zaire 74 event was intended to present and promote racial and cultural solidarity between African American and African people, with performers such as B.B. King. 80,000 people attended. |
| Ozark Music Festival | 1974 | Sedalia, Missouri, U.S. | Held 19–21 July 1974 on the Missouri State Fairgrounds, some estimates have put the crowd count at 350,000 people. |
| Rock Werchter | 1974–present | Werchter, Belgium | Can host 88,000 guests daily since 2018. From 1975 until 1998 named as 'Torhout-Werchter' since the festival was both hosted in Werchter and Torhout in the same weekend. |
| California Jam | 1974 | Ontario, California, U.S. | Co-headlined by Deep Purple and Emerson, Lake & Palmer, held at the Ontario Motor Speedway on 6 April 1974. It attracted 250,000 paying fans. The festival set what were then records for the loudest amplification system ever installed, the highest paid attendance, and highest gross in history. |
| Watchfield Free Festival | 1975 | Watchfield, England | On 23–31 August 1975, a former military site at Watchfield became the location of the People's Free Festival which had been held during the previous three years, despite opposition, in Windsor Great Park. The Windsor Free Festivals had been violently terminated by the police in 1974. This new site was offered as an alternative venue due to government embarrassment at previous police actions and was attended by several thousand people. Musicians who performed there included Hawkwind and Vivian Stanshall. Watchfield Free Festival was the only Free festival to be government sponsored (with assistance by then-Home Secretary Roy Jenkins), or be given official recognition. |
| Macroom Mountain Dew Festival | 1976–82 | Macroom, Ireland | Considered the first rock festival to take place in Ireland. The 1976 edition was headlined by Horslips and Marianne Faithfull, and the 1977 appearance by Rory Gallagher, attended by over 20,000 people, was considered especially notable. |
| Michigan Womyn's Music Festival | 1976–2015 | Michigan, U.S. | Called "the Original Womyn's Woodstock" and often referred to as MWMF or Michfest, is an international feminist music festival held every August in a small wooded area known as "The Land." The event is completely built, staffed, run and attended by women. |
| European Punk Rock Festival | 1976 | Mont de Marsan, France | In August 1976, the self-described "First European Punk Rock Festival". Eddie and the Hot Rods, a London pub rock group, headlined. The Sex Pistols, originally scheduled to play, were dropped by the organizers who said the band had gone "too far" in demanding top billing and certain amenities; The Clash backed out in solidarity. Organised by Zermati, took place at Mont-de-Marsan on 21 August 1976, and featured French bands Bijou, Il Biaritz and Shakin' Street, as well as The Damned. |
| Midtfyns Festival | 1976–2003 | Ringe, Denmark | In the festival's heyday it was competing with Roskilde Festival to be the biggest music event in Northern Europe, mostly due to Phish's appearance at the festival in 1998. |
| Cropredy Convention | 1976–present | Cropredy, England | Annual festival of folk and rock music held second week of August. Attracts up to 20,000 people each year, with ancillary events, such as morris dancing in the streets and live music at the village's two pubs. |
| 100 Club Punk Festival | 1976 | Oxford Street, London | A two-day event held at the 100 Club, a typically jazz-oriented venue in Oxford Street, London, England, on 20 and 21 September 1976. The gig showcased eight punk rock bands, most of which were unsigned. The bands in attendance were each associated with the evolving punk rock music scene and movement of the United Kingdom. The concert marked a watershed for the movement, as punk began to move from the underground and emerge into the mainstream music scene. |
| Paléo Festival | 1976–present | Nyon, Switzerland | 1976–2005 had 3.5 million spectators in total |
| Deeply Vale Festivals | 1976–1979 | England | The Deeply Vale Festivals were unique free festivals held near Bury in northwest England in 1976 through 1979. They are regarded as significant events that united punk music into the festival scene. |
| Nambassa | 1976–1981 | New Zealand | A series of hippie-conceived festivals held between 1976 and 1981 on large farms around Waihi and Waikino in New Zealand. They were music, arts and alternatives festivals that focused on peace, love, and an environmentally friendly lifestyle. The January 1979 three-day event attracted over 75,000 patrons making it the largest arts, multiple cultural and popular music event of its type in the world. |
| Waikino Music Festival | 1977 | New Zealand | |
| California Jam II | 1978 | Ontario, California, U.S. | 18 March 1978 and produced by Leonard Stogel, Sandy Feldman, and Don Branker. More than 350,000 people attended. The event was promoted by Wolf and Rissmiller Concerts. |
| Texxas Jam | 1978–1988 | Dallas, Texas/Houston, Texas, U.S. | Annual summer arena rock concert called the Texxas World Music Festival (1978–1988). It was held in Dallas at the Cotton Bowl, and in Houston, at either the Astrodome or the Rice Stadium on the campus of Rice University. Inspired by California Jam II, Texxas Jam was created by Louis Messina and David Krebs. Over 100,000 attended the first Texxas Jam on 1 July 1978, the hottest day of the decade (the temperature reached 104 degrees). It was the first southern stadium rock show since ZZ Top played to 80,000 people at UT Austin on 1 September 1974 and tore up the field. |
| Canada Jam | 1978 | Canada | Held on 26 August 1978. The festival was produced by Sandy Feldman and Leonard Stogel, who produced California Jam and California Jam II, and was sponsored by Carling O'Keefe. It attracted over 110,000 fans, making it the largest paying rock event in Canadian history at that time. |

=== 1980s–2020s ===
Selected historically notable rock festivals held since the 1980s
| Festival name | Location | Years | Details |
|---|---|---|---|
| Heatwave | Canada | 1980 | Important event for new wave and punk |
| Spring Rhythms. Tbilisi-80 | Soviet Union | 1980 | First official rock festival in the Soviet Union |
| Elephant Fayre | England | 1980-1986 | Lineup blended reggae/rock with major punk acts |
| US Festival | California, U.S. | 1982-1983 | Meant to fuse rock and technology |
| Super Rock '84 in Japan | Japan | 1984 | The lineup included Bon Jovi, Whitesnake, Scorpions, Michael Schenker Group and Anvil |
| Live Aid | London, UK/Philadelphia, U.S. | 1985 | 13 July 1985, held in two countries |
| Battle of the Beanfield | England | 1985 | Police action against free festival |
| Rock in Rio | Brazil | 1985–present | 1.5 million people attended the first event |
| Super Rock '85 in Japan | Japan | 1985 | The lineup included Dio, Foreigner, Sting, Mama's Boys and Rough Cutt |
| Street Scene | California, U.S. | 1986–2009 | One of the largest annual US music festivals |
| Rendez-vous Houston | Texas, U.S. | 1986 | Largest ticketed event in North America, 1 to 1.5 mill. attendees |
| Moscow Music Peace Festival | Soviet Union | 1989 | Important event for glam metal |
| Livid | Australia | 1989–2003 | Alternative rock festival for international and local bands |
| Wacken Open Air | Germany | 1990–present | Large metal showcase |
| International Pop Underground Convention | Washington, U.S. | 1991 | Punk and indie rock festival |
| Big Day Out | Australia | 1992–2014 | Multiple stages and genres |
| Sziget | Hungary | 1993–present | Large Woodstock style event |
| Woodstock '94 | United States | 12–14 Aug 1994 | First real Woodstock Festival since the 1969 Festival. 350,000+ in attendance, much like the original Woodstock as it rained that weekend and there was mud and fun. Several of the original artists from the 1969 Festival performed. Peaceful crowd and no problems. Widely known as Generation X's Woodstock. |
| Whitby Goth Weekend | England | 1994–present | Large goth/industrial festival |
| Przystanek Woodstock | Poland | 1995–present | Ticket-free festival with crowds up to 625,000 |
| Vans Warped Tour | United States | 1995–2018 | Punk rock showcase |
| V Festival | England | 1996–present | Two concurrent stages |
| Fuji Rock Festival | Japan | 1997–present | In 2005, more than 100,000 people attended |
| Vive Latino | Mexico City, Mexico | 1998–present | Is an annual music festival held in Mexico City. It is one of the most important music festivals in Mexico |
| Nashestvie | Russia | 1999-2019 | One of largest Russian rock open-air festivals. Cancelled due to government interference. |
| Woodstock 1999 | Rome, New York, U.S. | 1999 | Known as a commercial and crowd control disaster |
| Summer Sonic Festival | Japan | 2000–present | Major commercial festival |
| Rock in Roma | Italy | 2002–present | Several groups perform over a month |
| Download Festival | England | 2003–present | Hard rock, heavy metal and punk |
| Molson Canadian Rocks for Toronto | Canada | 2003 | Largest outdoor ticketed event in Canada (estimated 450,000 to 500,000) |
| Soundwave | Australia | 2004–2015 | Alt rock and metal/punk focus |
| Oxegen | Ireland | 2004–2013 | One of largest rock/pop festivals in Ireland |
| Live 8 | Many | 2005 | Ten simultaneous benefit concerts in 8 countries |
| Wanee Festival | Live Oak, Florida | 2005-2018 | Annual event held 2005 - 2018 at the Spirit of the Suwannee Music Park, in Live Oak, Florida. The festival was hosted by the Allman Brothers Band until 2014. |
| WaveAid | Australia | 2005 | Benefit Concert in Sydney for 2004 Indian Ocean earthquake |
| Live Earth | Worldwide | 2007 | Widely broadcast worldwide for the February 2009 Victorian bushfires |
| Sound Relief | Australia | 2009 | Benefit Concert in Sydney and Melbourne |
| Corona Capital | Mexico City, Mexico | 2010–present | Annual music festival held in Mexico City, taking place in the Autódromo Hermanos Rodríguez. It debuted in 2010 and is organized by Grupo CIE. It primarily features rock and alternative music. |
| El Abrazo 2010 | Santiago, Chile | 2010 | Festival that brought together rock musicians from Chile and Argentina to celebrate the bicentennial of both countries. |
| Welcome to Rockville | Daytona Beach, Florida | 2011–present | The hard rock and heavy metal music festival is the largest rock festival in North America. |
| Peach Music Festival | Scranton, Pennsylvania | 2012–present | Annual music festival started by the Allman Brothers Band and Live Nation Entertainment that has been held annually since 2012 at the Pavilion at Montage Mountain in Scranton, Pennsylvania. |
| Fire Fight Australia | Australia | 2020 | Benefit Concert in Sydney for 2019–20 Australian bushfire season |

== Traveling festivals ==
A recent innovation is the traveling rock festival where many musical acts perform at multiple locations during a tour. Successful festivals are often held in subsequent years. The following is an incomplete list.

- 70000 Tons of Metal
- Anger Management Tour
- Australian Made
- Chris Jericho's Rock 'N' Wrestling Rager at Sea
- Crüe Fest
- Curiosa
- Deconstruction Tour
- Family Values Tour
- Festival Express
- G3
- Gigantour
- Rock Boat
- Hard Electric Tour
- Headbangers Boat
- Lilith Fair
- Knotfest
- Mayhem Festival
- Magic Circle Festival
- Monsters of Rock Cruise
- Nintendo Fusion Tour
- Ozzfest
- Projekt Revolution
- Persistence Tour
- Rock Never Stops Tour
- Sad Summer Festival
- ShipRocked
- Sonisphere Festival
- Sounds of the Underground
- Soundwave
- Summer Sanitarium
- Taste of Chaos
- The Unholy Alliance Tour
- Uproar Festival
- Warped Tour

== Current rock festivals ==
The following is a list of festivals that predominantly feature rock genres that take place on a regular basis. Most are held at the same location on an annual basis. Some, like Farm Aid are held at different venues with each incarnation.

=== Africa ===
==== Botswana ====
- Overthrust Winter Metal Mania Festival (Ghanzi)

==== South Africa ====
- Misty Waters Music Festival (Secunda)

=== Asia ===
==== China ====
- Midi Modern Music Festival (Beijing)
- Modern Sky Festival (Beijing)

==== India ====
- Bangalore Open Air (Karnataka)
- Thunderstrock Festival (Ranchi, Jharkhand)

==== Indonesia ====
- Hammersonic Festival (Jakarta)
- Hellprint (Bandung)
- Rock In Celebes (Makassar)
- Rock In Solo (Surakarta, Central Java)

==== Japan ====
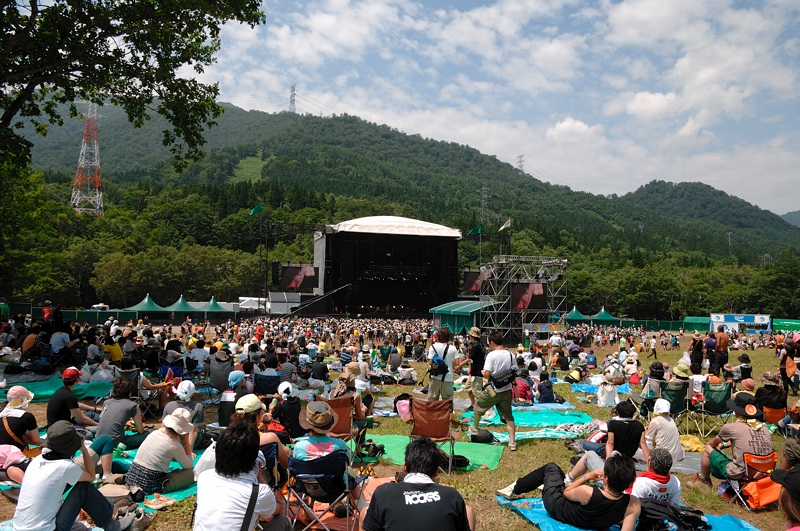
Fuji Rock Festival 2007

- BLARE FEST (Nagoya)
- Fuji Rock Festival (Naeba)
- Loud Park Festival
- Rising Sun Rock Festival (Ishikari)
- Rock In Japan (Chiba)
- Summer Sonic Festival (Chiba and Osaka)

==== South Korea ====
- Busan Rock Festival (Busan)
- DMZ Peace Train Music Festival (Cheorwon)
- Pentaport Rock Festival (Incheon)

=== Europe ===
==== Austria ====
- Kaltenbach Open Air (Styria)
- Nova Rock (Nickelsdorf)

==== Belgium ====
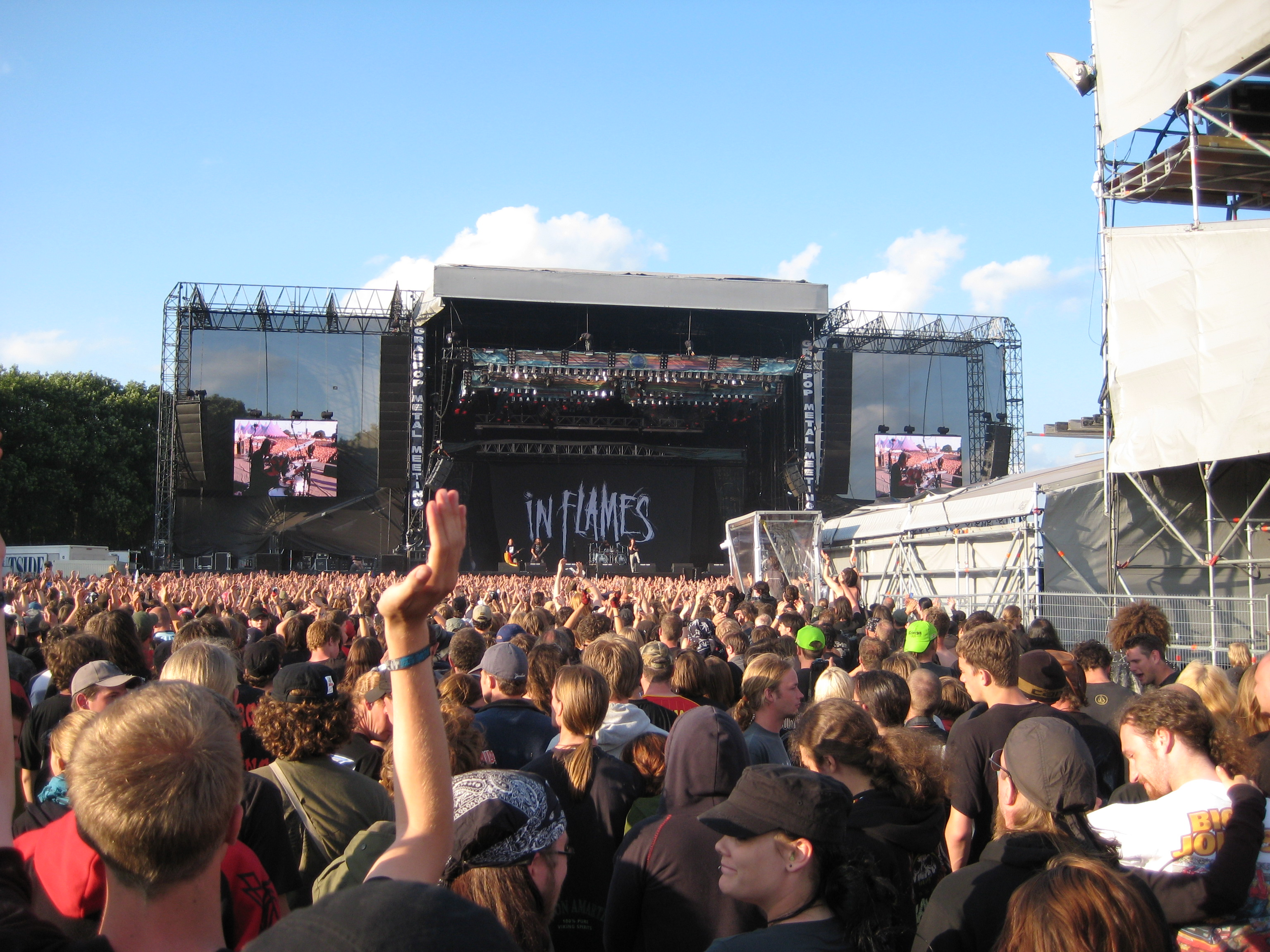
Graspop Metal Meeting

- Alcatraz Hard Rock & Metal Festival (Kortrijk)
- Blast from the Past Festival (Kuurne)
- Durbuy Rock (Bomal)
- Graspop Metal Meeting (Dessel)
- Headbanger's Balls Fest (Izegem)
- Hell's Balls (Kortrijk)
- Huginns Awakening Fest (Oostende)
- Ieperfest (Ypres)
- Rock Werchter (Werchter)

==== Czech Republic ====
- Basin Fire Fest (Spálené Poříčí)
- Brutal Assault (Jaroměř)
- Masters of Rock (Vizovice)
- Metalfest (Plzeň)
- Mighty Sounds (Tábor)
- Obscene Extreme (Trutnov)
- Rock Castle (Moravský Krumlov)
- Rock for People (Hradec Králové)
- Trutnov Open Air Music Festival (Trutnov)

==== Denmark ====
- Aalborg Metal Festival (Aalborg)
- Copenhell (Copenhagen, Zealand)
- Metal Magic Festival (Fredericia, Jutland)
- Royal Metal Fest (Aarhus, Jutland)
- Viborg Metal Festival (Viborg, Jutland)

==== Estonia ====
- Hard Rock Laager (Vana-Vigala, Märjamaa Parish)
- Howls of Winter (Tallinn)

==== Finland ====
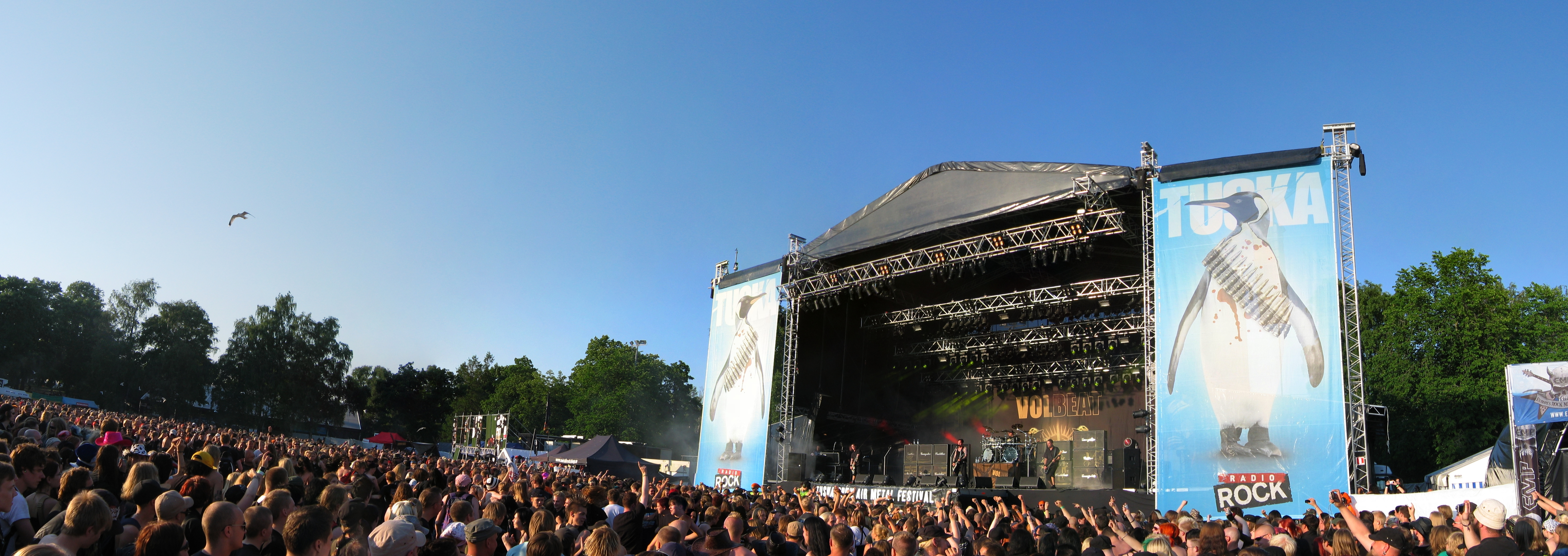
Tuska Open Air Metal Festival in Finland

- Dark River Festival (Kotka)
- Down By The Laituri (Turku)
- Hellsinki Metal Festival (Helsinki)
- Ilosaarirock (Joensuu)
- John Smith Rock Festival (Laukaa)
- Kuopiorock (Kuopio)
- Nummirock (Kauhajoki)
- Provinssirock (Seinäjoki)
- Qstock (Oulu)
- Ruisrock (Turku)
- SaariHelvetti (Tampere)
- Steelfest Open Air (Hyvinkää)
- Tammerfest (Tampere)
- Turku Saatanalle (Turku)
- Tuska Open Air Metal Festival (Helsinki)
- Puntala-rock (Lempäälä)

==== France ====
- Eurockéennes (Belfort)
- Hellfest (Clisson)
- Motocultor Festival (Brittany)
- Plane'R Fest (Colombier-Saugnieu)
- Rock en Seine (Saint-Cloud)
- SYLAK Open Air (Saint-Maurice-de-Gourdans)

==== Germany ====
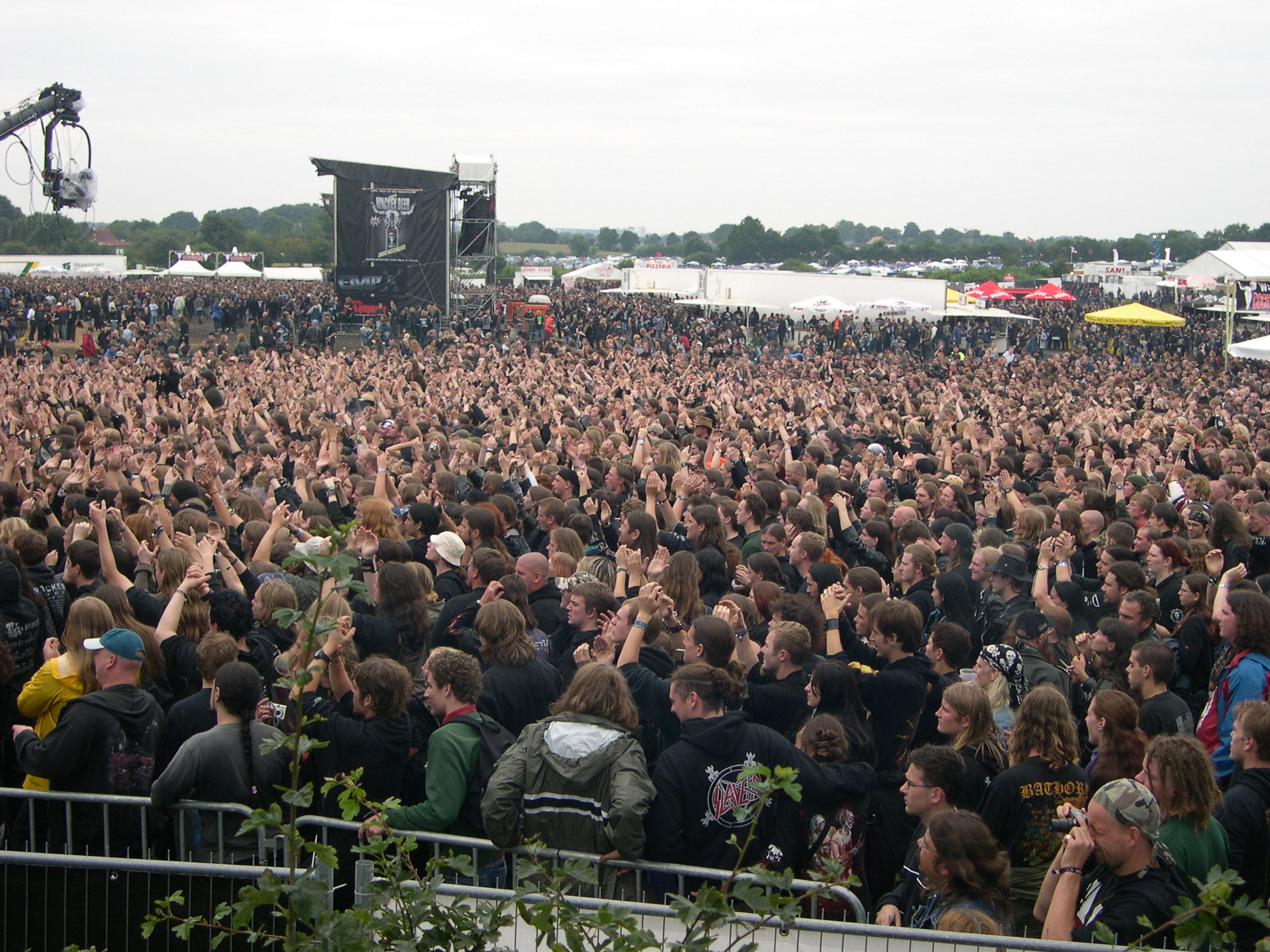
Wacken Open Air in 2005

- British Rock Meeting
- Chronical Moshers Open Air (Heinsdorfergrund)
- Dark Troll Festival
- Dong Open Air (Neukirchen-Vluyn)
- Download Festival (Baden-Württemberg)
- Elbriot (Hamburg)
- Euroblast Festival (Cologne)
- Full Force (Löbnitz)
- Hurricane Festival (Scheeßel)
- Impericon Festivals
- IN FLAMMEN Open Air (Torgau)
- Maifeld Derby (Mannheim)
- Mammut Festival
- M'era Luna Festival (Hildesheim)
- Metal Frenzy Open Air Festival (Gardelegen)
- Party.San Metal Open Air
- Ragnarök Festival (Lichtenfels, Bavaria)
- Reload Festival
- Rock am Ring and Rock im Park (Nürburgring and Nuremberg Nazi Party rally grounds)
- Rock Hard Festival (Gelsenkirchen)
- ROCKHARZ Festival
- Rock um zu helfen (Freiberg, Saxony)
- rockXplosion
- Southside (Neuhausen)
- Summer Breeze Open Air (Dinkelsbühl)
- Under the Black Sun Festival (Friesack)
- Wacken Open Air (Wacken)

==== Italy ====
- Frontiers Rock Festival (Trezzo sull'Adda)
- Rock in Roma (Rome)

==== The Netherlands ====
- Bospop (Weert)
- Dynamo Open Air (Eindhoven)
- Into the Grave (Leeuwarden)
- Jera on Air (Ysselsteyn)
- Midsummer Prog Festival (Valkenburg)
- Pinkpop Festival (Landgraaf)
- ProgPower Europe (Baarlo)
- Roadburn Festival (Tilburg)
- South of Heaven (Maastricht)
- Zwarte Cross (Lichtenvoorde)

==== Norway ====
- Bukta Tromsø Open Air Festival (Tromsø)
- Garasjefestival (Reinsvoll)
- Inferno Metal Festival (Oslo)
- Karmøygeddon Metal Festival (Kopervik)
- Tons of Rock (Oslo)

==== Portugal ====
- Evil Live (Lisbon)
- HARDMETALFEST (Mangualde)
- Laurus Nobilis Music Fest(Vila Nova de Famalicão)
- MEO Marés Vivas (Vila Nova de Gaia)
- Paredes de Coura Festival (Paredes de Coura)
- Rock in Rio (Lisbon)
- SWR Barroselas Metalfest (Barroselas)
- Vagos Metal Fest (Calvão (Vagos))
- Vilar de Mouros Festival (Vilar de Mouros)

==== Romania ====
- Artmania Festival (Sibiu)
- Metal Gates Festival (Bucharest)
- Metalhead Meeting (Bucharest)
- Posada Rock Fest (Câmpulung)
- Rockstadt Extreme Fest (Rasnov)

==== Russia ====
- Dobrofest (Yaroslavl Oblast)
- Metal Over Russia (Moscow)

==== Spain ====
- Barcelona Rock Fest (Barcelona)
- Leyendas del Rock (Villena)
- Resurrection Festival (Viveiro)
- Rock Imperium Festival (Cartagena)
- Z! LIVE ROCK FEST (Zamora)

==== Sweden ====
- House of Metal (Umeå)
- Sweden Rock Festival (Sölvesborg)
- Time to Rock Festival

==== United Kingdom ====
- ArcTanGent Festival (Compton Martin, England)
- Bloodstock Open Air (Walton-on-Trent, England)
- Damnation Festival (Leeds, England)
- Download Festival (Castle Donington, England)
- Fairport's Cropredy Convention (Cropredy, England)
- Hard Rock Hell (Pwllheli, Wales)
- Incineration Festival (London, England)
- Outbreak Festival (Manchester, England)
- Rebellion Festival (Blackpool, England)
- Slam Dunk Festival
- Stonedead Festival (Newark-on-Trent, England)

==== Rest of Europe ====
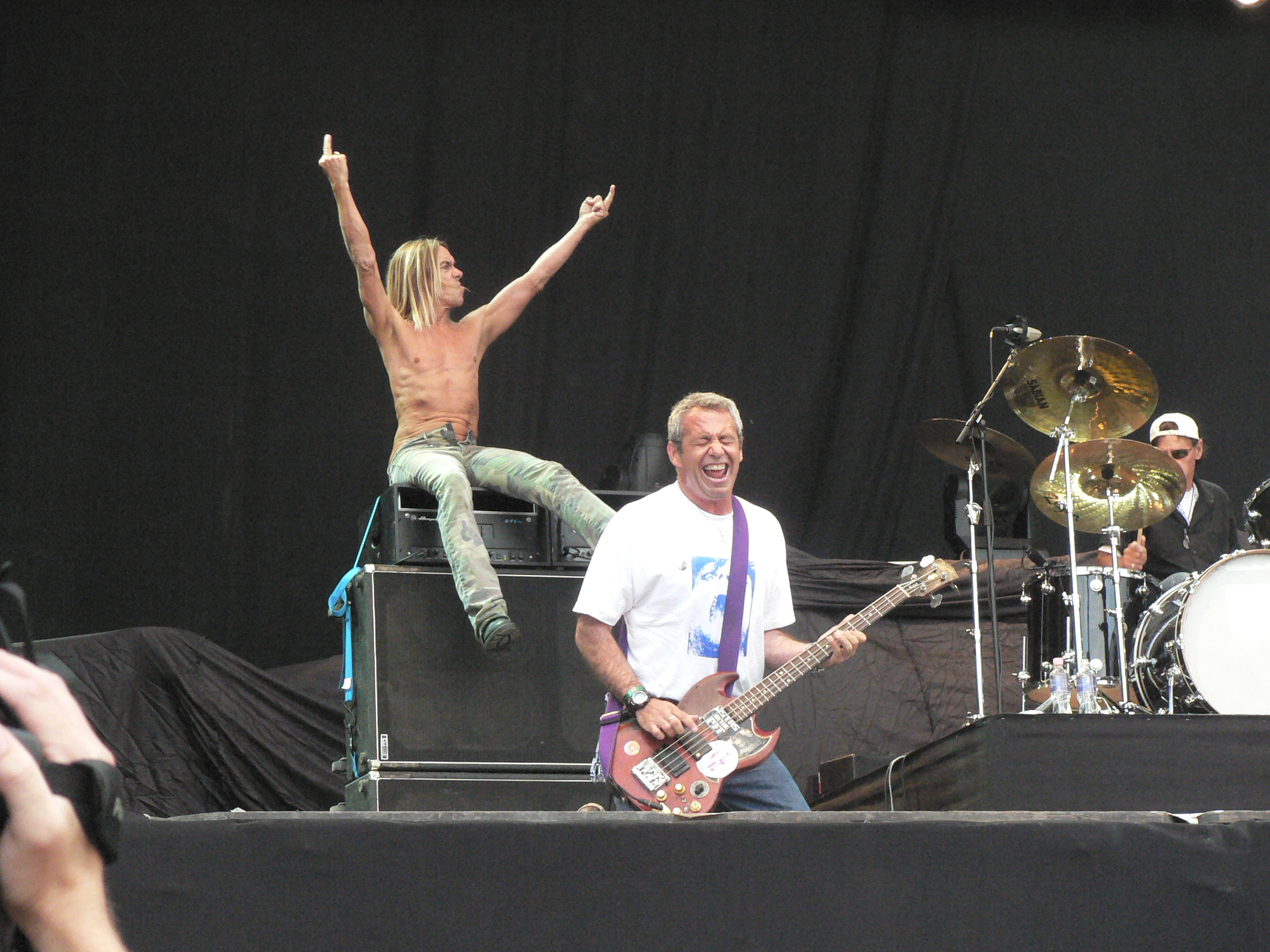
Iggy Pop, Mike Watt and Scott Asheton at Sziget Festival, Budapest

- Gitarijada (Zaječar, Serbia)
- Hills of Rock (Plovdiv and Sofia, Bulgaria)
- Kilkim Žaibu (Varniai, Lithuania)
- Paléo Festival (Nyon, Switzerland)
- Pol'and'Rock Festival (Kostrzyn, Poland)
- Rockwave Festival (Athens, Greece)
- Slane Festival (Slane, Ireland)
- Tolminator (Tolmin, Slovenia)
- Zobens un Lemess (Bauska, Latvia)

=== North America ===
==== Canada ====
- Festival d'été de Québec (Quebec City)
- Gaspesian Metal Fest (Matane)
- Hyperspace Metal Festival (Vancouver)
- Montebello Rock (Montebello, Quebec)
- Osheaga (Montreal)
- Rockin' the Fields of Minnedosa (Manitoba)
- Rock La Cauze
- Rock the River (Saskatoon, Saskatchewan)

==== Mexico ====
- Candelabrum Metal Fest
- Corona Capital (Mexico City)
- Cumbre Tajín (Veracruz)
- Hell & Heaven Metal Fest (Mexico City)
- México Metal Fest (Monterrey)
- Pal Norte (Nuevo León)
- Vive Latino (Mexico City)

==== United States ====
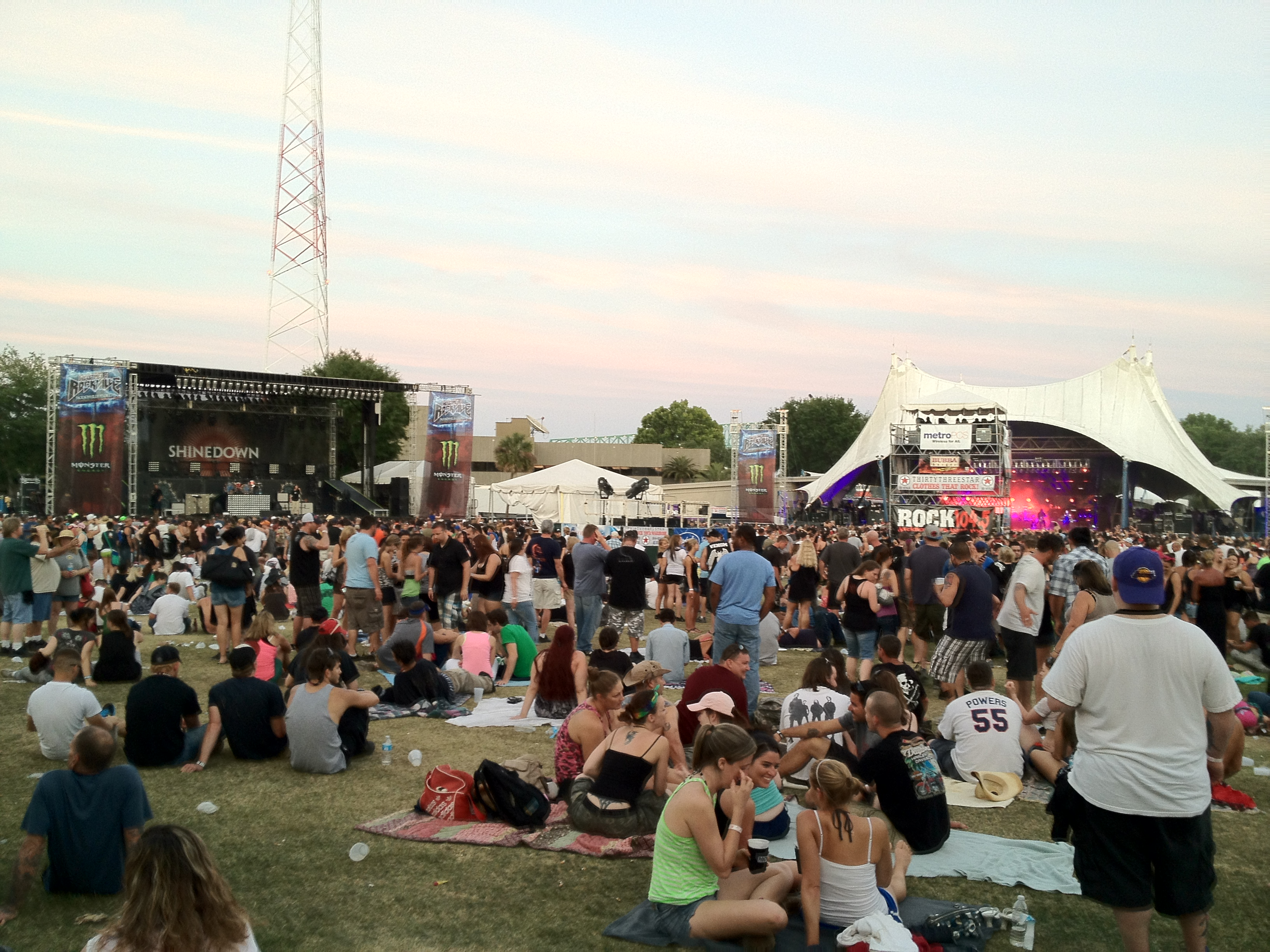
Welcome to Rockville in 2012

- 98RockFest (Tampa, Florida)
- Aftershock Festival (Sacramento, California)
- AURA Fest (Savannah, Georgia)
- Earthday Birthday (Orlando, Florida)
- Farm Aid (United States)
- The Fest (Gainesville, Florida)
- Florida Folk Festival (White Springs, Florida)
- Foreign Dissent (Orlando, Florida)
- Furnace Fest (Birmingham, Alabama)
- Hell's Heroes (Houston, Texas)
- INKcarceration (Mansfield, Ohio)
- Kerrville Folk Festival (Kerrville, Texas)
- Legions of Metal Fest (Chicago, Illinois)
- Louder Than Life (Louisville, Kentucky)
- M3 Rock Festival (Columbia, Maryland)
- Mad With Power Fest (Madison, Wisconsin)
- Maryland Deathfest (Baltimore, Maryland)
- Mass Destruction Metal Fest (Atlanta, Georgia)
- Milwaukee Metal Fest (Milwaukee, Wisconsin)
- Moondance Jam (Walker, Minnesota)
- New England Metal and Hardcore Festival (Worcester, Massachusetts)
- Pointfest (St. Louis, Missouri)
- ProgPower USA (Atlanta, Georgia)
- Punk Rock Bowling Music Festival (Las Vegas, Nevada)
- Riot Fest (Chicago, Illinois)
- Rock Fest (Cadott, Wisconsin)
- Rocklahoma (Pryor, Oklahoma)
- Shaky Knees Music Festival (Atlanta, Georgia)
- Sick New World (Las Vegas, Nevada)
- Sonic Temple (Columbus, Ohio)
- Sound and Fury Festival (Los Angeles, California)
- Treefort Music Fest (Boise, Idaho)
- Upheaval Festival (Grand Rapids, Michigan)
- Welcome to Rockville (Daytona Beach, Florida)
- When We Were Young (Winchester, Nevada)

=== Oceania ===
==== Australia ====
- Byron Bay Bluesfest (Byron Bay)
- Golden Plains Festival (Meredith, Victoria)
- Good Things Festival (Melbourne, Sydney, Brisbane)
- Woodford Folk Festival (Queensland, Australia)

=== South America ===
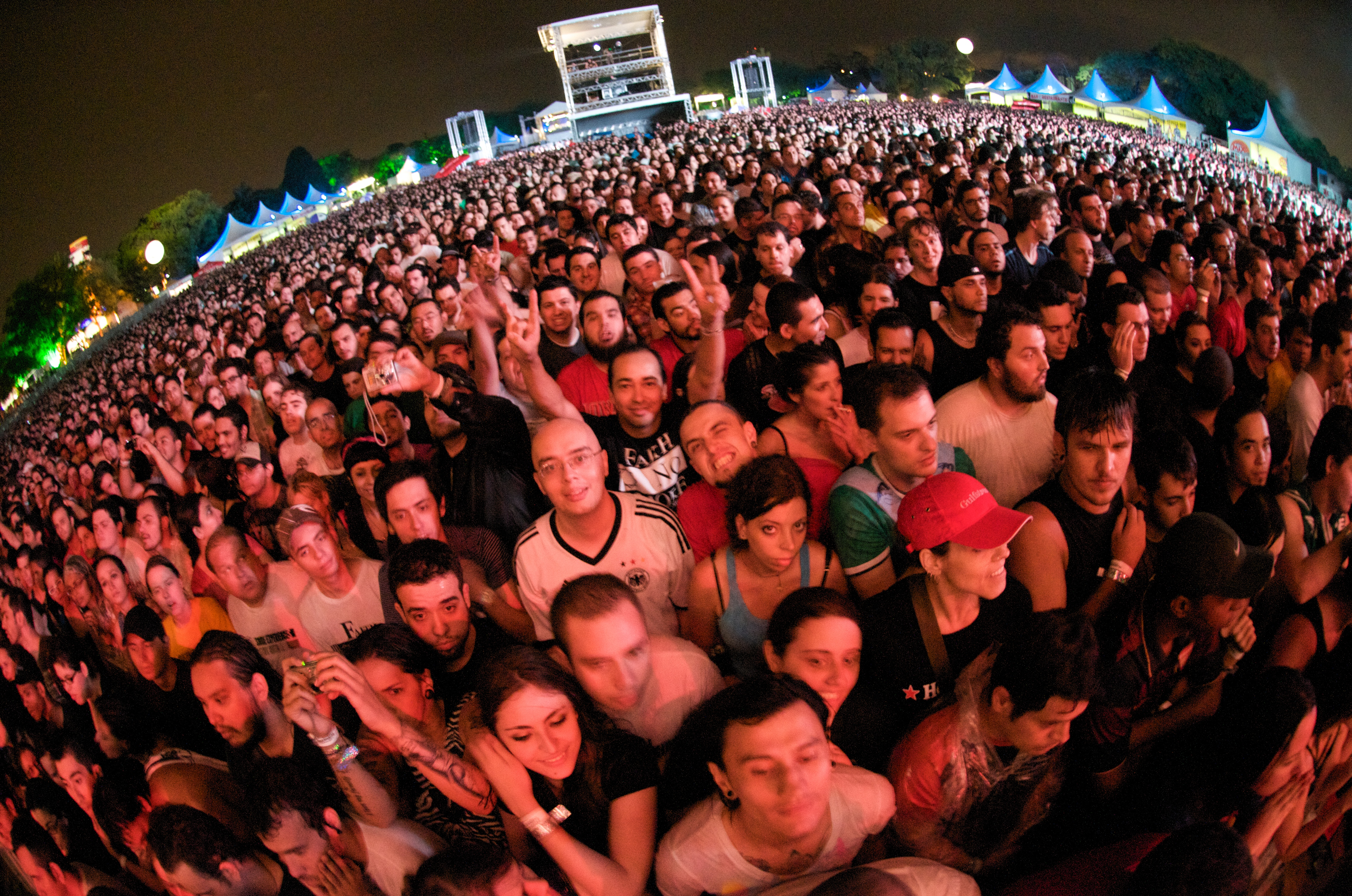
RockOut Fest in São Paulo, Brazil

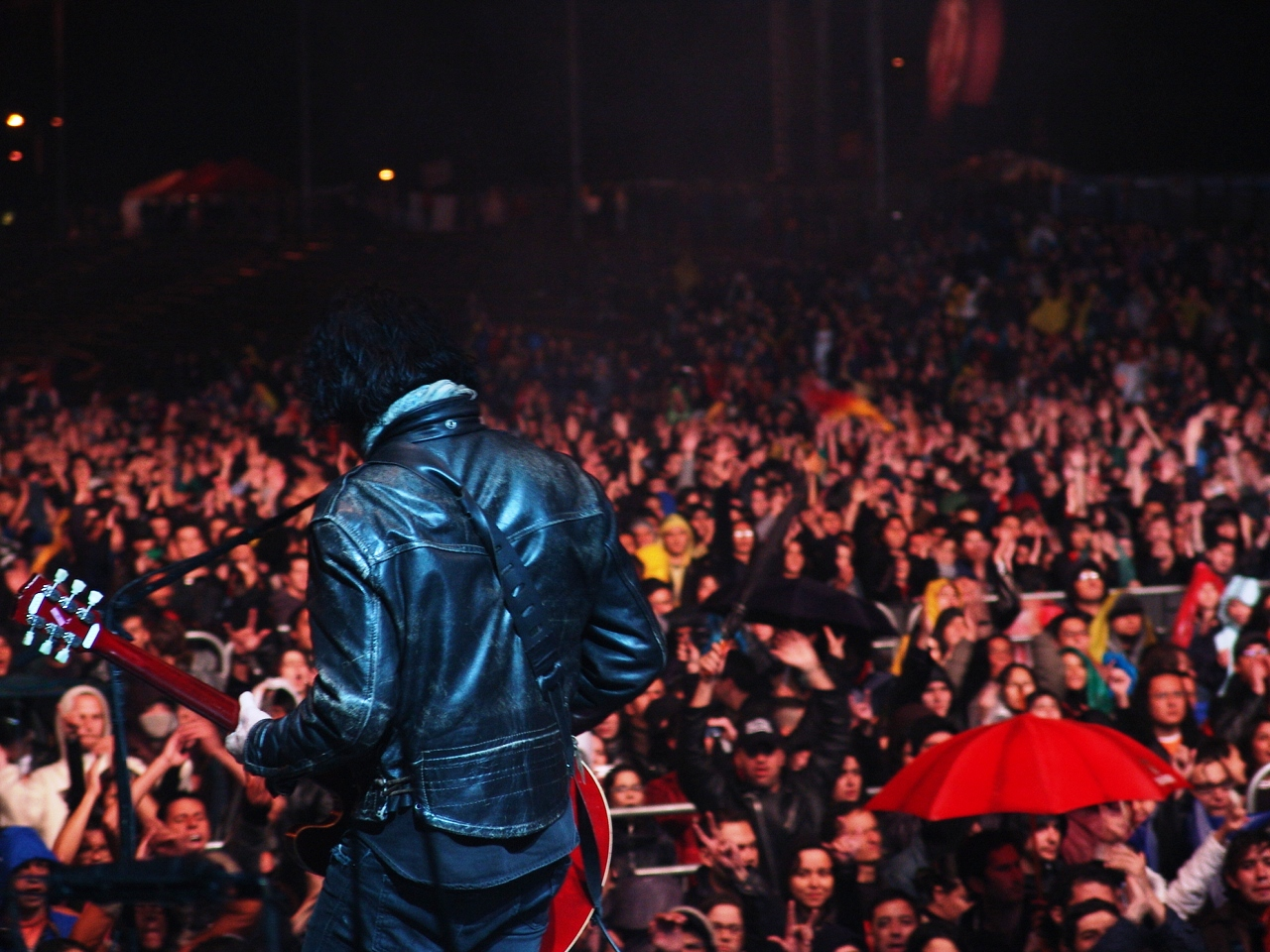
Rock al Parque in Bogota

==== Argentina ====
- Cosquín Rock (Córdoba)
- Quilmes Rock (Buenos Aires)

==== Brazil ====
- Rock in Rio (Rio de Janeiro)
- RockOut Fest (São Paulo)

==== Chile ====
- The Metal Fest Chile (Castro, Chiloé Island)
- Rock en Conce (Concepción, Chile)

==== Rest of South America ====
- ReciclArte (San Bernardino, Paraguay)
- Rock al Parque (Bogotá, Colombia)
- Vivo x el Rock (Lima, Peru)
