= Led Zeppelin Tour of Iceland, Bath and Germany, Summer 1970 =

1970 concert tour by Led Zeppelin

Iceland, Bath and Germany, Summer 1970
- Tour by Led Zeppelin
- Poster for Led Zeppelin's concert at Berlin, used to help promote its Summer 1970 tour of Germany
- Location: Iceland; England; West Germany
- Associated album: Led Zeppelin II
- Start date: 22 June 1970
- End date: 19 July 1970
- Legs: 2
- No. of shows: 6

Led Zeppelin concert chronology
- North America Spring 1970; Iceland, Bath and Germany, Summer 1970; North America Summer 1970

Led Zeppelin's Summer 1970 tour of Iceland, Bath and Germany was a concert tour by the English rock band. The tour commenced on 22 June and concluded on 19 July 1970.

== Overview ==
Led Zeppelin's sole performance in England during this tour was one of the most important of the band's career. They accepted an offer from promoter Freddy Bannister to headline the Bath Festival, in Shepton Mallet, at a fee of £20,000. This was the second time Led Zeppelin performed at this festival, having also appeared at the Bath Festival of Blues during their U.K. tour in summer 1969.

The band's performance at Bath in 1970 in front of an audience of 150,000 people is widely considered by music critics, and members of Led Zeppelin itself, as representing a turning point in terms of the amount of recognition they received in Britain. Until that point their on-stage success and popularity had largely been borne out on numerous United States concert tours. This concert helped foster an improved relationship with the U.K. press, which gave them consistently good reviews for their performance at the festival. Tantalisingly, however, the only known audio documents of the festival exist in very poor quality as Led Zeppelin bootleg recordings.

This tour is also notable for the band's visit to Iceland for their opening show at Laugardalshöll. It was this visit which inspired singer Robert Plant to write the lyrics to "Immigrant Song", which was subsequently featured on their forthcoming album Led Zeppelin III. This song premiered at the Bath Festival, just six days after their show in Iceland. A short segment of footage of Jimmy Page playing bowed guitar during "Dazed and Confused" during Led Zeppelin's performance at Laugardalshöll was included on the menu clips of the Led Zeppelin DVD (2003).

== Tour set list ==
The fairly typical set list for the tour was:

1. "Immigrant Song" (Page, Plant) (beginning with the Bath Festival)
2. "Heartbreaker" (Bonham, Page, Plant)
3. "Dazed and Confused" (Page)
4. "Bring It On Home" (Page, Plant, Dixon)
5. "Since I've Been Loving You" (Page, Plant, Jones)
6. "Organ Solo"/"Thank You" (Page, Plant)
7. "That's the Way" (Page, Plant)
8. "What Is and What Should Never Be" (Page, Plant)
9. "Moby Dick" (Page, Jones, Bonham)
10. "How Many More Times" (Plant, Jones, Bonham, Plant) (Dropped after Bath Festival)

Encore:

1. "Whole Lotta Love" (Dixon, Page, Plant, Jones, Bonham)
2. "Communication Breakdown" (Page, Jones, Bonham)
3. "Long Tall Sally" (Johnson, Blackwell, Penniman) (On 28 June only)

There were some set list substitutions, variations, and order switches during the tour.

== Tour dates ==
Date	City	Country	Venue
Leg 1 – Iceland & Bath Festival
22 June 1970	Reykjavík	Iceland	Laugardalshöll
28 June 1970	Shepton Mallet	England	Bath Festival of Blues and Progressive Music
Leg 2 – West Germany
16 July 1970	Cologne	West Germany	Sporthalle
17 July 1970	Essen	West Germany	Grugahalle
18 July 1970	Frankfurt	West Germany	Festhalle Frankfurt
19 July 1970	West Berlin	West Germany	Deutschlandhalle

== Sources ==
- Lewis, Dave and Pallett, Simon (1997) Led Zeppelin: The Concert File, London: Omnibus Press. ISBN 0-7119-5307-4.
- Grugahalle account is first hand observation by author - I was there.
