= Led Zeppelin North American Tour Summer 1970 =

1970 concert tour by Led Zeppelin

North America Summer 1970
- Tour by Led Zeppelin
- Poster for Led Zeppelin's concert at Seattle, used to help promote its Summer 1970 North American tour
- Location: United States; Canada
- Associated album: Led Zeppelin III
- Start date: 15 August 1970
- End date: 19 September 1970
- No. of shows: 20 (29 planned)

Led Zeppelin concert chronology
- Iceland, Bath & Germany 1970; North America Summer 1970; U.K. Spring 1971

Led Zeppelin's Summer 1970 North American Tour was the sixth concert tour of North America by the English rock band. The tour commenced on 10 August and concluded on 19 September 1970.

== Overview ==
This concert tour was a massive success for Led Zeppelin, as they played to wildly enthusiastic audiences. It was their highest-grossing tour to date (for the two New York City concerts alone, the band grossed $100,000). With The Rolling Stones off the road at the time, only The Who could now compete with Led Zeppelin for the title of the world's top concert attraction. The band were widely hailed as bigger than The Beatles, dethroning them in the polls for the first time in rock history.

This concert tour was originally scheduled to commence on 5 August at Cincinnati. However, the first week was rescheduled due to the ill health of the father of bass player John Paul Jones. The itinerary was amended several times, leading to much confusion, with the band erroneously being billed to appear at the Strawberry Fields Festival on the weekend of August 8–9. The tour eventually commenced on August 10 at Hampton.

During this tour the band mixed their third album at Ardent Studios, Memphis, in August 1970. The album was released in October 1970, shortly following the conclusion of this tour.

== Tour set list ==
The fairly typical set list for the tour was:

1. "Immigrant Song" (Page, Plant)
2. "Heartbreaker" (Bonham, Page, Plant)
3. "Dazed and Confused" (Page)
4. "Bring It On Home" (Page, Plant, Dixon)
5. "That's the Way" (Page, Plant)
6. "Bron-Yr-Aur" (Page)
7. "Since I've Been Loving You" (Page, Plant, Jones)
8. "Organ Solo"/"Thank You" (Page, Plant)
9. "What Is and What Should Never Be" (Page, Plant)
10. "Moby Dick" (Page, Jones, Bonham)
11. "Whole Lotta Love" (Bonham, Dixon, Jones, Page, Plant)

Encore:

- "Communication Breakdown" (Bonham, Jones, Page)
- "Out on the Tiles" (Page, Plant, Bonham) (On 4 September, 6 September (late), and 19 September)
- "How Many More Times" (Page, Jones, Bonham) (On 19 September)
- "Train Kept A-Rollin' (Bradshaw, Kay, Mann) (On 2 September)
- "Blueberry Hill" (Lewis, Stock) (On 2 September and 4 September)
- "Babe I'm Gonna Leave You" (Bredon, Page, Plant) (On 6 September (late))

There were some set list substitutions, variations, and order switches during the tour.

== Tour dates ==
The original itinerary before John Paul Jones' father's illness was:

Date	City	Country	Venue
5 August 1970	Cincinnati	United States	Unknown
6 August 1970	Detroit	United States	Olympia Stadium
7 August 1970	Cleveland	United States	Cleveland Public Auditorium
8 August 1970	Pittsburgh	United States	Pittsburgh Civic Arena
9 August 1970	Boston	United States	Boston Garden
10 August 1970	Hampton	United States	Hampton Coliseum
11 August 1970	Charlotte	United States	Charlotte Coliseum
12 August 1970	Jacksonville	United States	Jacksonville Memorial Coliseum
13 August 1970	Hollywood	United States	Hollywood Sportatorium
14 August 1970	Chestnut Hill	United States	Boston College Alumni Stadium
15 August 1970	New Haven	United States	Yale Bowl
19 August 1970	Kansas City	United States	Kansas City Municipal Auditorium
20 August 1970	Oklahoma City	United States	Oklahoma State Fair Arena
21 August 1970	Tulsa	United States	Tulsa Assembly Center
22 August 1970	Fort Worth	United States	Tarrant County Arena
23 August 1970	San Antonio	United States	HemisFair Arena
24 August 1970	St. Louis	United States	Kiel Auditorium
25 August 1970	Nashville	United States	Nashville Municipal Auditorium
27 August 1970	Milwaukee	United States	Milwaukee Arena
29 August 1970	Winnipeg	Canada	Winnipeg Arena
1 September 1970	Seattle	United States	Seattle Center Coliseum
2 September 1970	Oakland	United States	Alameda County Coliseum
3 September 1970	San Diego	United States	San Diego Sports Arena
4 September 1970	Inglewood	United States	The Forum
5 September 1970	Honolulu	United States	Neil S. Blaisdell Arena
6 September 1970	Honolulu	United States	Neil S. Blaisdell Arena
7 September 1970	Raleigh	United States	J.S Dorton Arena
12 September 1970	Cleveland	United States	Cleveland Public Hall
14 September 1970	Rochester	United States	War Memorial Auditorium
17 September 1970	Philadelphia	United States	The Spectrum
19 September 1970	New York City	United States	Madison Square Garden
20 September 1970	Washington, D.C.	United States	Cole Fieldhouse

While the final tour dates were:

Date	City	Country	Venue
10 August 1970	Hampton	United States	Hampton Roads Coliseum
15 August 1970	New Haven	United States	Yale Bowl
19 August 1970	Kansas City	United States	Municipal Auditorium
20 August 1970	Oklahoma City	United States	State Fair Coliseum
21 August 1970	Tulsa	United States	Assembly Center
22 August 1970	Fort Worth	United States	Tarrant County Convention Center
25 August 1970	Nashville	United States	Nashville Municipal Auditorium
26 August 1970	Cleveland	United States	Public Auditorium
28 August 1970	Detroit	United States	Olympia Stadium
29 August 1970	Winnipeg	Canada	Man-Pop Festival, Winnipeg Arena
31 August 1970	Milwaukee	United States	Milwaukee Arena
1 September 1970	Seattle	United States	Seattle Center Coliseum
2 September 1970	Oakland	United States	Oakland Coliseum
3 September 1970	San Diego	United States	San Diego Sports Arena
4 September 1970	Inglewood	United States	The Forum
6 September 1970	Honolulu	United States	Honolulu International Center; 2 shows
9 September 1970	Boston	United States	Boston Garden
19 September 1970	New York City	United States	Madison Square Garden; 2 shows

== Sources ==
- Lewis, Dave and Pallett, Simon (1997) Led Zeppelin: The Concert File, London: Omnibus Press. ISBN 0-7119-5307-4.
