= Grim Reapers Motorcycle Club =

Grim Reapers Motorcycle Club may refer to:

- Grim Reapers Motorcycle Club (Canada)
- Grim Reapers Motorcycle Club (USA)
