= Canada Jam =

1978 rock festival in Ontario, Canada

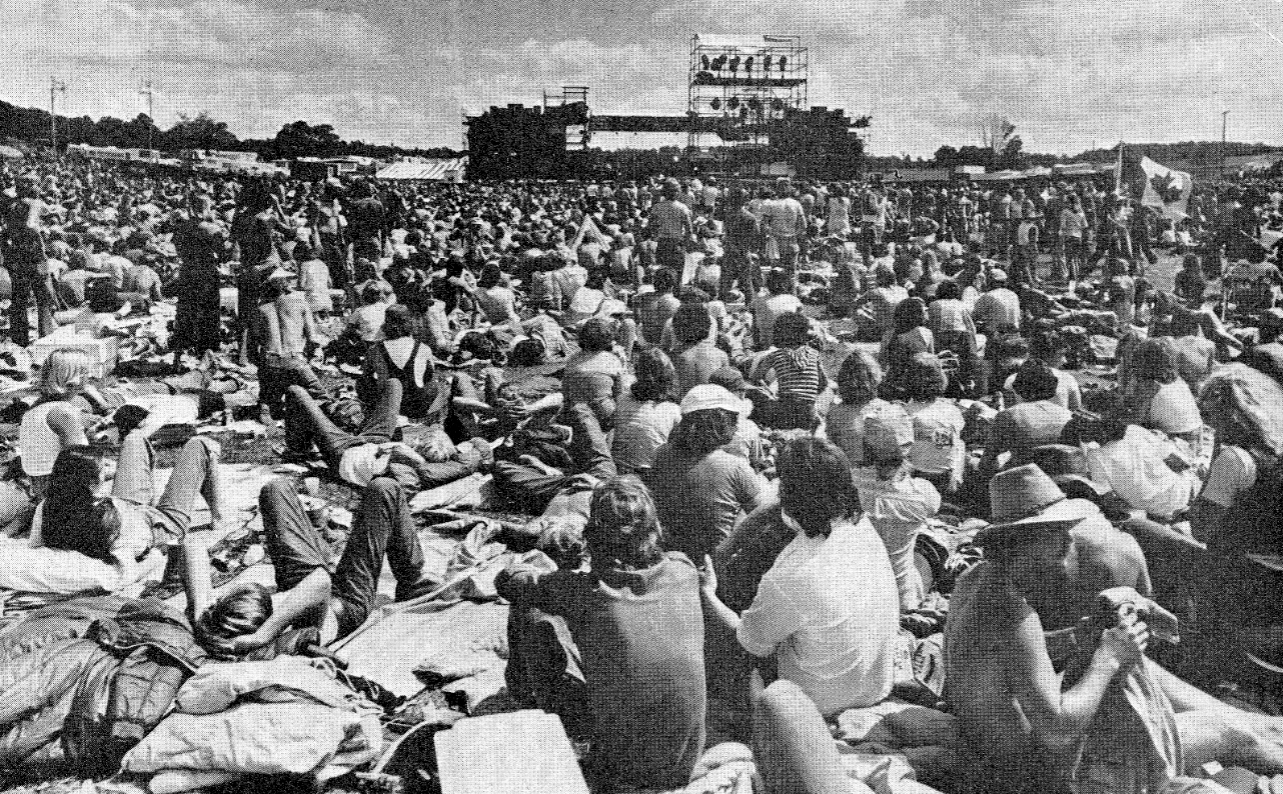
- Genre: Rock music, pop
- Dates: August 26, 1978
- Location: Mosport Park north of Bowmanville, Ontario Canada
- Founders: Sandy Feldman and Leonard Stogel
- Attendance: 110,000 (tickets)

Canada Jam was a rock festival concert held at Mosport Park in Bowmanville, Ontario, Canada, about 100 kilometres east of Toronto, on August 26, 1978. The festival was produced by Sandy Feldman and Leonard Stogel, who produced California Jam and California Jam II, and was sponsored by Carling O'Keefe. It attracted over 110,000 fans, making it the largest paying rock event in Canadian history at that time. The Molson Canadian Rocks for Toronto a.k.a. "SARSfest" featuring the Rolling Stones, AC/DC, Rush plus more eclipsed that mark with an audience of 450,000 people on July 30, 2003.

Canada Jam was the second of three major music festivals held at Mosport between 1970 and 1980. The other two were the Woodstock-like Strawberry Fields Festival held August 7–9, 1970, and the punk and new wave themed, Heatwave Festival held August 23, 1980. Both these festivals were produced by Toronto promoter John Brower who facilitated the introduction to Mosport Park for Feldman and Stogel.

== Performers ==
Canada Jam acts in order of appearance:

- Ozark Mountain Daredevils
- The Doobie Brothers
- Atlanta Rhythm Section
- Village People
- Dave Mason
- Wha-Koo
- Prism
- Kansas
- Commodores
- Triumph

The program ran for 18 hours (3 hours behind schedule) and ended with Triumph's encore at 3:35 AM.

== Broadcast, telecast, and record releases ==
Four television specials were made from the event and broadcast across the CTV television network in Canada. Several performances from the show were eventually released on CD and video, both in bootleg and authorized form including performances by Kansas and Triumph. The event was hosted by CFTR-AM (AM680) in Toronto.

Roughly 350 people were treated in the medical tent for fatigue, cuts and drug and alcohol-related ailments, but no major incidents or issues occurred. Tickets for the event sold for $20.00 in advance and $30.00 on the day of the event and the event grossed an estimated 2.5 million dollars.

== See also ==
- List of historic rock festivals
- List of jam band music festivals
- Lenny Stogel IMDB
