= Vancouver Pop Festival =

1969 music festival in Canada

- Genre: Rock, pop, etc.
- Dates: August 22, 23 and 24, 1969
- Locations: Squamish, British Columbia; Canada
- Years active: 1969
- Founders: Candi Promotions

The Vancouver Pop Festival was a rock festival held at the Paradise Valley Resort in Squamish, British Columbia, Canada. The dates of the festival were August 22, 23 and 24, 1969. It was produced by Candi Promotions.

the Grateful Dead did play the festival on Sunday. Strawberry Alarm Clock might not have played. A band named Crow was the surprise hit for those who liked hard rock. Bikers provided an uncomfortable, "avoid taking hallucinogens" vibe.

== Lineup ==
Due to problems with paid attendance, only some of the acts listed below performed. It has been claimed that the Grateful Dead did not perform but Jerry Garcia biographer Blair Jackson disputed this, and speculated the Dead took the gig to move on from their poor performance at the Woodstock festival a week earlier. An eyewitness who attended the festival confirms that the Grateful Dead did play on Sunday.

The groups playing at the festival included (in alphabetical order):

- Canned Heat
- A Group called Smith
- The Chambers Brothers
- Chicago Transit Authority
- Alice Cooper
- Crome Syrcus
- Crow
- Flying Burrito Brothers
- The Grass Roots
- Grateful Dead
- The Guess Who
- Love
- Taj Mahal
- Brownie McGhee
- Merryweather
- Motherlode
- Poco
- The Rascals
- Little Richard
- Merrilee Rush
- Strawberry Alarm Clock
- Sonny Terry
- The Byrds, interrupted by drunken Bikers, poor security

== See also ==
- List of historic rock festivals
- List of music festivals in Canada
