= Midwest Rock Festival =

American music festival

The Midwest Rock Festival
- Genre: Rock, pop, etc.
- Dates: July 25–27, 1969
- Locations: West Allis, Wisconsin; United States
- Years active: 1969

The Midwest Rock Festival was a music festival held at the State Fair Park in West Allis, Wisconsin, on July 25–27, 1969.

The festival featured Led Zeppelin, Buffy Sainte-Marie, The First Edition, Sweetwater, Pacific Gas & Electric, SRC and Shag (July 25); Blind Faith, Delaney and Bonnie and Friends, Shag, Taste, John Mayall & the Bluesbreakers, MC5 and SRC (July 26); and Johnny Winter, Joe Cocker and the Grease Band, Bob Seger System, Jim Schwall Blues Period, MC5, Zephyr, Shag, Litter and SRC (July 27).

The show had a flatbed trailer as a stage set on the field in front of the racetrack grandstand.

== See also ==
- List of music festivals in the United States
- List of historic rock festivals
