= Super Concert '70 =

- Genre: Rock music
- Dates: September 4, 1970
- Locations: West Berlin, West Germany
- Years active: 1970

Super Concert '70 was a one-day music festival held at the Deutschlandhalle in West Berlin, West Germany, on September 4, 1970. Headlined by Jimi Hendrix, the bill also featured Cat Mother & the All Night Newsboys, Procol Harum, Ten Years After, and Canned Heat, whose harmonica/guitar player and singer, Alan "Blind Owl" Wilson, had died the day before.

This was Hendrix's second-to-last performance; his final appearance on stage came two days later, at the Open Air Love & Peace Festival in Fehmarn, West Germany.

== See also ==
- List of historic rock festivals
- List of music festivals
