= Down by the Laituri =

Down By The Laituri
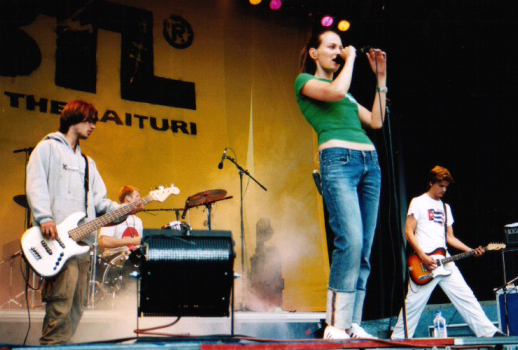
- Locations: Turku, Finland
- Years active: 1988-present
- Website: http://www.dbtl.fi/

Down By The Laituri (often shortened to DBTL) is a rock festival organised annually in the city of Turku, Finland since 1988. In the month of July, the festival is organised next to the river Aura in Turku's city center. In Finland, DBTL is the largest and oldest festival to be organised in a city center. In 2005, the festival took place from 27 to 31 July, attracting approximately 70,000 people and included performances from Panasonic (now Pan Sonic) and Jimi Tenor.
