= Maifeld Derby =

German annual music festival held in Mannheim

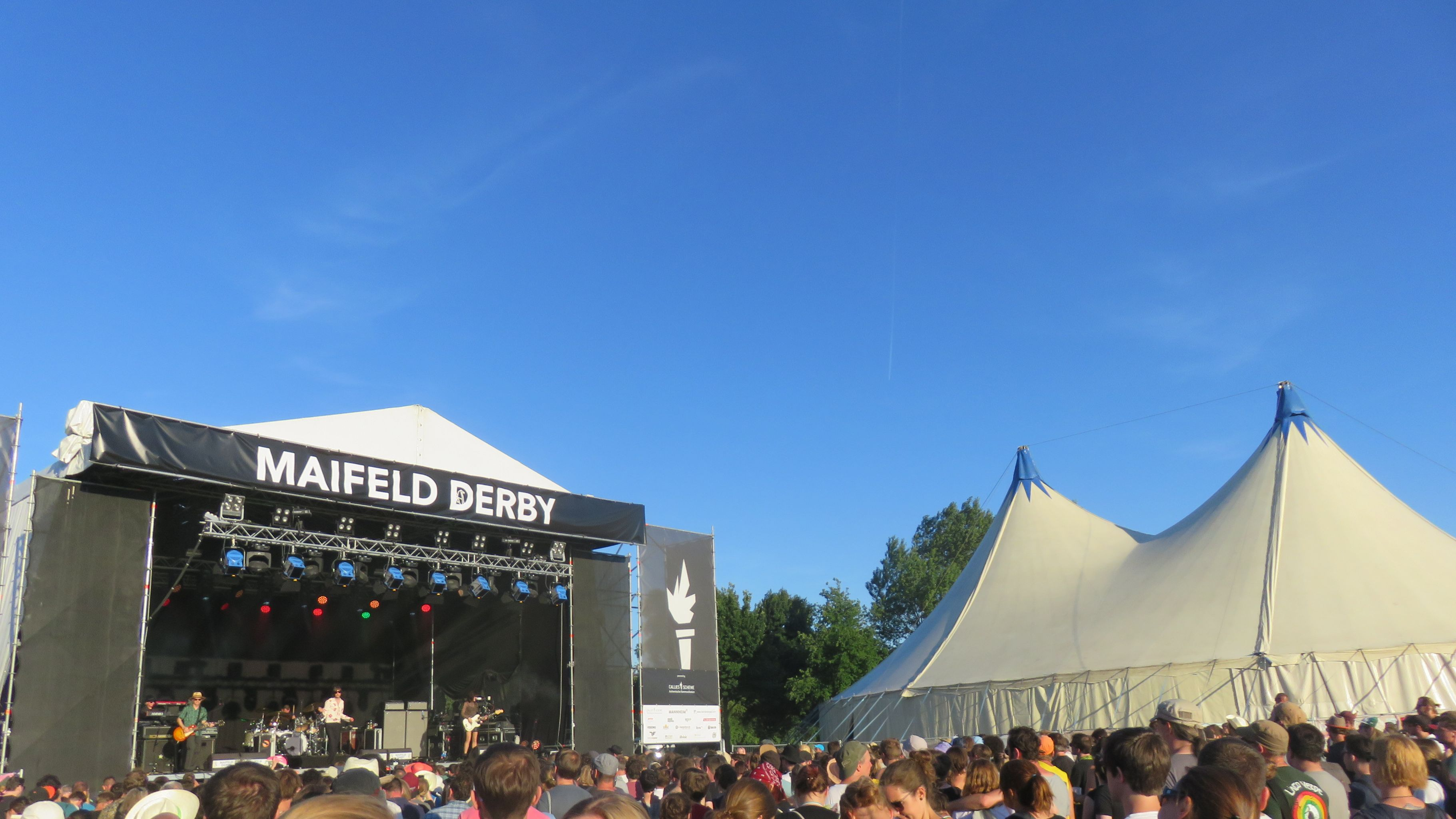
- 2017 Maifeld Derby
- Genre: Rock, Alternative rock, Indie rock, World music, Punk rock, Electronic music, Folk music, hip hop
- Locations: Mannheim, Germany
- Years active: 2011 - present
- Website: Maifeld Derby

Maifeld Derby is an annual rock festival in Mannheim held at the riding stadium of Mannheim May Market. The festival held for 2 days in 2011 and 2012, and was held for 3 days from 2013. The organiser is Timo Kumpf, well known as the bassist of Get Well Soon.

The first festival was held in 2011, attracting more than 3,000 spectators. The number of spectators exceeded 10,000 in 2014.

In 2016, the festival was named the second best festival in Germany by Intro, and Musikexpress was named the festival with the best lineup in Germany.

In 2020, the festival was cancelled due to the COVID-19 pandemic, and in 2021, it was limited to 1,500 spectators. The 2023 Maifeld Derby was held from 16 to 18 June.

== See also ==
- Rock festival
