= Bath Festival of Blues and Progressive Music =

British music festival

Bath Festival of Blues and Progressive Music 1970
- Event poster
- Genre: Rock music, blues
- Dates: 27–29 June 1970
- Location: Shepton Mallet
- Years active: 1970
- Founders: Freddy Bannister

The Bath Festival of Blues and Progressive Music was a counterculture era music festival held at the Royal Bath and West Showground in Shepton Mallet, Somerset, England on 27–29 June 1970. Bands such as Pink Floyd and Led Zeppelin performed, and the festival was widely bootlegged. An 'alternative festival' was staged in an adjoining field where the Pink Fairies and Hawkwind played on the back of a flatbed lorry.

== History ==
The festival started at midday on the 27th (a Saturday) and finished on the following Monday at about 6:30 am. John Peel played records for early arrivers from the Friday evening and continued to do so between many of the sets until the end. The festival featured a line-up of the top British and American west coast bands of the day, including Led Zeppelin (headlining act), Pink Floyd, Hot Tuna, Country Joe McDonald, Colosseum, Jefferson Airplane (set aborted), The Byrds (acoustic set), Santana, The Flock, The Moody Blues (unable to play), Dr. John (acoustic set), Frank Zappa & The Mothers of Invention, Canned Heat, It's a Beautiful Day, Steppenwolf, Johnny Winter, John Mayall with Peter Green, Pentangle, Fairport Convention, Keef Hartley, and the Maynard Ferguson Big Band.

Bath was the brainchild of promoter Freddy Bannister and his wife Wendy Bannister, who had held the smaller Bath Festival of Blues within Bath itself in 1969. The 1970 show attracted a significantly larger crowd of 150,000, but, like the Isle of Wight festival, an audience of such magnitude created some serious on-ground difficulties. The logistics proved to be too vast for Bannister's small team to adequately cope with, and his security staff stole large amounts of gate receipts, resulting in a far smaller profit than expected.

An 'alternative festival' was staged in an adjoining field where the Pink Fairies and Hawkwind played on the back of a flatbed lorry.

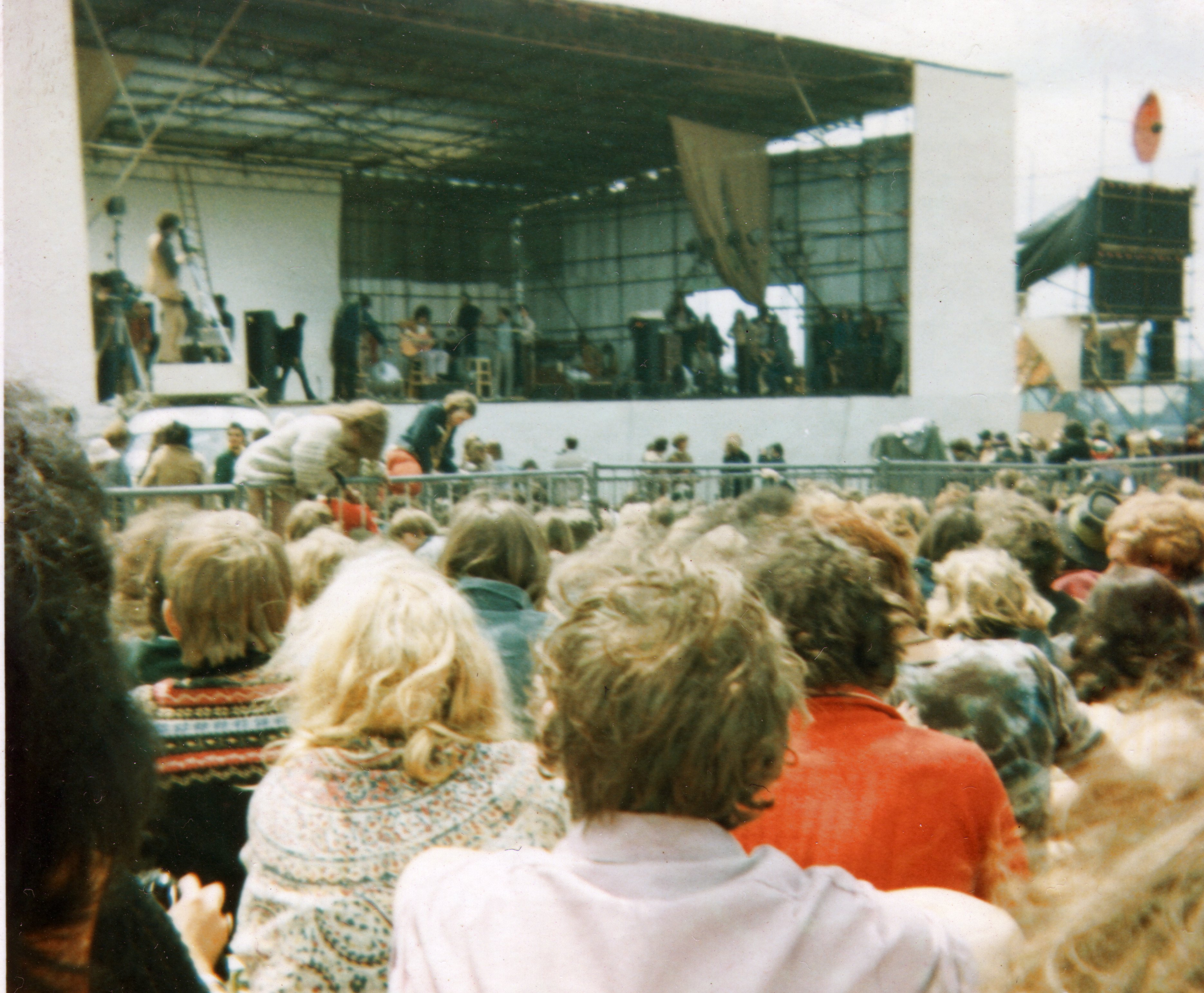
The stage – Donovan has just begun his set

== Led Zeppelin performance ==
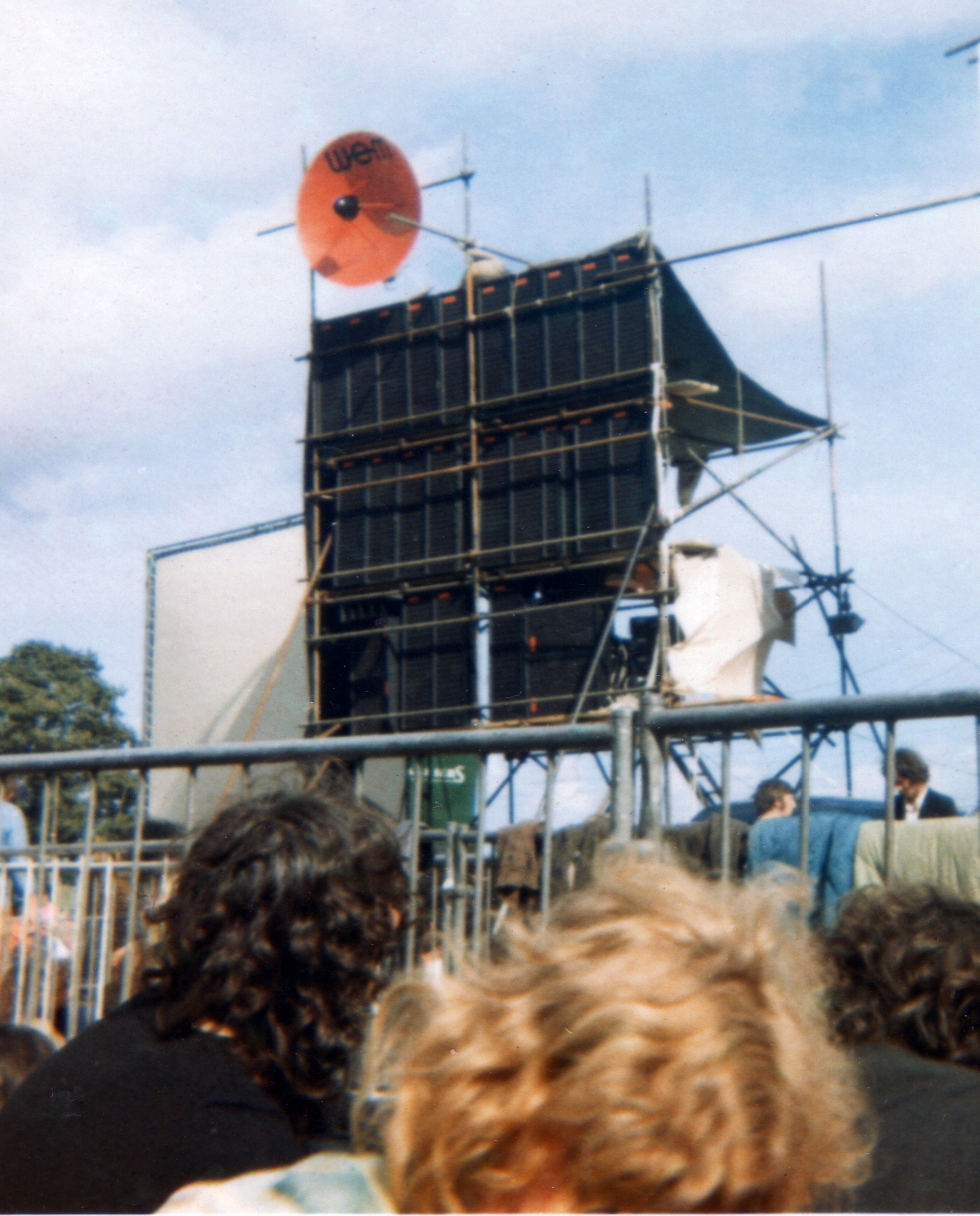
The lefthand PA system — with one of the two projection screens to the left of that

Led Zeppelin accepted an offer from Bannister to headline for a fee of £20,000. They took to the stage at about 8:30 pm, as the sun was setting. The performance is considered by critics, and the band, as one of the most important of their career, representing a turning point in the recognition they received in Great Britain (until that point their on-stage success and popularity had largely been borne out on numerous United States concert tours). It was also one of the largest crowds the band performed to; well over 200,000 people were estimated at the time they took the stage. "Although we were about eight miles away from the stage," recalled Saxon's Biff Byford, "I'll never forget Jimmy Page playing guitar with a bow."

Led Zeppelin played for three hours.

== See also ==
- List of historic rock festivals
- List of blues festivals
