= California Jam II =

1978 American music festival

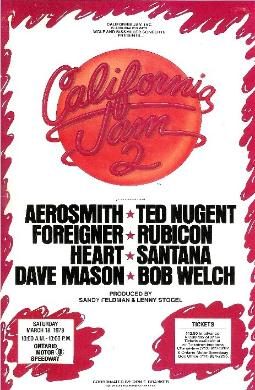
- California Jam 2
- Genre: Rock music, acid rock
- Dates: March 18, 1978
- Locations: Ontario Motor Speedway, Ontario, California
- Founders: Leonard Stogel, Sandy Feldman, and Don Branker
- Attendance: 250,000+
- Website: The Official califorinajamfanclub.

California Jam II (also known as Cal Jam II) was a music festival held in Ontario, California, at the Ontario Motor Speedway on March 18, 1978, and produced by Leonard Stogel, Sandy Feldman, and Don Branker. More than 350,000 people attended. The event was promoted by Wolf & Rissmiller Concerts. The festival was a sequel to the original California Jam held in 1974.

== Performers ==
Press coverage the next day in the Los Angeles Times

Musical acts featured at the festival included:

- Aerosmith
- Foreigner
- Heart
- Mahogany Rush
- Dave Mason
- Jean-Michel Jarre
- Rubicon
- Santana
- Bob Welch
- Ted Nugent

== Broadcast, telecast, and record releases ==
A television special featuring highlights of the festival was broadcast a few months later on the American Broadcasting Company network. CBS Records concurrently released a two-LP soundtrack album of selections from the concert, the track listing of which appears below. Selections from Bob Welch and Foreigner were not included in the soundtrack, as only artists who were contracted to one of CBS's labels were represented.

Local radio stations KMET & KLOS aired live simulcasts of the show. Many in attendance listened to the concert on the radio, due to the poor quality of the sound system.

== Track listing ==
No.	Title	Writer(s)	Length
1.	"Jugando" (performed by Santana)	Carlos Santana, José Areas	2:04
2.	"Dance Sister Dance (Baila Mi Hermana)" (performed by Santana)	Leon "Ndugu" Chancler, Tom Coster, David Rubinson	7:41
3.	"Let It Go, Let It Flow" (performed by Dave Mason)	Dave Mason	4:21
4.	"We Just Disagree" (performed by Dave Mason)	Jim Krueger	3:04
5.	"Love Alive" (performed by Heart)	Ann Wilson, Nancy Wilson, Roger Fisher	4:29
6.	"Little Queen" (performed by Heart)	A. Wilson, N. Wilson, Fisher, Michael Derosier, Howard Leese, Steve Fossen	6:49
7.	"Free-for-All" (performed by Ted Nugent, Rob Grange, Derek St. Holmes, Cliff Davies)	Ted Nugent	5:09
8.	"Snakeskin Cowboys" (performed by Ted Nugent, Rob Grange, Derek St. Holmes, Cliff Davies)	Ted Nugent	4:35
9.	"Same Old Song and Dance" (performed by Aerosmith)	Steven Tyler, Joe Perry	3:13
10.	"Draw the Line" (performed by Aerosmith)	Tyler, Perry	4:34
11.	"Chip Away the Stone" (performed by Aerosmith)	Tyler, Perry, Richard Supa	4:06
12.	"Oxygène Part V" (performed by Jean-Michel Jarre)	Jean-Michel Jarre	4:38
13.	"I'm a King Bee" (performed by Frank Marino & Mahogany Rush)	James Moore aka Slim Harpo	6:22
14.	"Johnny B. Goode" (performed by Frank Marino & Mahogany Rush)	Chuck Berry	8:04
15.	"Never Gonna Leave" (performed by Rubicon)	Max Haskett	3:43
16.	"Too Hot to Handle" (performed by Rubicon)	Jack Blades, Dennis Marcellino	4:06
Total length:			1:16:58

== See also ==
- List of historic rock festivals
- List of jam band music festivals
- Leonard Stogel IMDB
