= Dianne Heatherington =

Canadian actor and singer

- Born: May 14, 1948
- Origin: Fort Rouge, Winnipeg
- Died: October 22, 1996 (age 48)
- Genre: Rock
- Occupations: Singer, Actor
- Instrument: Vocals
- Years active: 1969 - 1995

Dianne Mae Heatherington (May 14, 1948 – October 22, 1996) was a Canadian singer of several genres, particularly rock, whose musical career spanned nearly two decades. In the latter part of her career, she became a successful businessperson in the film security industry, while at the same time enjoying modest success as a Canadian film and television actress.

She was nominated for a Juno Award in 1981 in the category of Most Promising Female Vocalist of the Year. She also hosted her own national CBC Television series, Dianne, in 1971.

In May 1993, she was diagnosed with ovarian cancer from which she died on October 22, 1996, aged 48, in Toronto.

== Early life and musical career ==
Heatherington was born in Fort Rouge, Winnipeg. Described as "the undisputed First Lady of Winnipeg rock 'n' roll", she commenced her musical career in Winnipeg, Manitoba, where she was the lead singer of Dianne Heatherington and The Merry-Go-Round. The band included Bill Wallace, later a member of The Guess Who. She became a local legend when, in 1970, she personally shamed Led Zeppelin into performing at the Man-Pop Festival, when they had already been paid pursuant to a rain clause in their contract, and were preparing to leave Winnipeg without performing.

Heatherington relocated to Toronto from Winnipeg in the early 1970s. To commemorate her departure, The Guess Who recorded the Kurt Winter-Bill Wallace composition, "Bye Bye Babe", on their 1973 Artificial Paradise album. In Toronto, she formed a band which by 1976 included Dave Garber, Sandy Chochinov and Mark Rutherford. She and her band became increasingly popular in the Toronto and area club scene.

In 1980, her only album, Heatherington Rocks, was released on Epic Records. The album included a mix of original and cover material. Three of the standout tracks were rearrangements of The Beatles' "Helter Skelter" and Bruce Cockburn's "Mama Just Wants To Barrelhouse All Night Long", plus "Mr. Nice Guy", co-written by Heatherington and members of her band. Rik Emmett of Triumph contributed acoustic guitar on "Barrelhouse" and "Rock n' Roll Gypsies." The basic album had been recorded in 1978 for GRT Records, which had gone bankrupt as of the summer of 1979, prior to releasing the album. Heatherington purchased the master tapes from the bankruptcy trustee. "Helter Skelter" was released as a single, with "Mr. Nice Guy" as the B-Side. Despite Heatherington's ownership of the master tapes, the album has not been released in CD format, through her estate or otherwise.

In 1980, a one-hour documentary on Heatherington, Soul Survivor, chronicling the challenges of a woman in the music business, was produced under the auspices of the Canadian Filmmakers Distribution Centre and aired on CBC Television. In 1981, Heatherington was nominated for a Juno Award in the category of Most Promising Female Vocalist of the Year, but lost to Carole Pope.

In 1983, Heatherington decided to further her musical career by moving to New York City. For eighteen months, she was the weekend performer at the well-known Joe's Bar in the East Village. She sang rock songs on Saturdays and, at the insistence of the bar owner, country and western songs on Fridays. Despite her public popularity singing both genres, there was no record company interest. She returned to Toronto in 1985. At various points during the 1980s, she sang jazz and blues standards as a lounge act, accompanied solely by a pianist. This included a 1983 engagement at Winnipeg's prestigious Marlborough Hotel. In 1987 she retired from singing professionally.

== Acting career ==
Her acting career began to develop in 1982, when she appeared on an episode of the television series Seeing Things. She had modest success in film and television roles, which occurred particularly between 1988 and 1995. While she was in one major international film success, Cocktail (1988), her roles were generally minor. A notable exception was a co-starring role in Zero Patience, which "examines and refutes the urban legend of the alleged introduction of HIV to North America by a single individual, Gaëtan Dugas".

== Business career ==
Contemporaneous to her 1988-1995 period as an actress, she started a movie location security company, the Dianne Heatherington Security Company, which provided 24-hour location security. The business became highly successful, providing location security to major budget films and television series being shot in and around Toronto. At its height, it employed approximately thirty people, some of whom were musicians Heatherington had met during her singing career and to whom she now offered more stable economic prospects.

== Personal life ==
In 1977, she married musician Gary Taylor, in a Toronto civil ceremony performed by musician Greg Leskiw, a former member of The Guess Who. Heatherington, Taylor and Leskiw all had originally been Winnipeg-based. She remained married to Taylor until her death.

== Postscripts ==
In the years since her death, there has been increased interest in preserving her memory. A tribute website was established, containing numerous video and audio clips, plus recollections of friends and fellow musicians. In 2008, tribute concerts were held in Toronto and Winnipeg, for the purpose of raising money for cancer research, as well as the establishment of a music scholarship in Heatherington's name at the University of Manitoba.

== Discography ==
- Heatherington Rocks (1980)

== Filmography ==
- The Shamrock Conspiracy (1995) - TV
- To Save the Children (1994) - TV
- Zero Patience (1993)
- Taking the Heat (1993) - TV
- Perfectly Normal (1990)
- Liberace: Behind the Music (1988) - TV
- Cocktail (1988)
- Seeing Things (1982) - TV, episode "Hear No Evil, See No Evil".
- Soul Survivor (1980) (TV)
- Dianne (1971) (TV)
