= Hard Electric Tour =

Music festival in India

- Genre: rock music
- Dates: December 12 to December 19
- Locations: Delhi, Bangalore, Dimapur, Shillong
- Founders: John Maram and Paul Hongkung
- Website: Official Site

Hard Electric Tour is a first-of-its-kind annual international winter music festival in India. The tour is the brainchild of John Maram, the founder of Re-Invent Clock.

The 2009 tour would see bands from the US and UK along with renowned Indian bands. The tour would consist of all genres of music and would last for a week starting December 12 and ending December 19. The idea of the tour is to attract and entertain the youth while at the same time educating and bringing awareness about drug abuse and HIV/AIDS campaign.

== Tour Venues ==
1. Delhi
2. Bangalore
3. Dimapur
4. Shillong

== Lineups ==
- Shadows Chasing Ghosts
- Rampazze
- Pot FM
- Barefaced Liars
- Recycle
- Blakc
- Divine Connection
