= Man-Pop Festival =

Music festival in Winnipeg, Manitoba, Canada

Coordinates: 49.8872°N 97.1974°W

- Genre: Rock music, pop music, etc.
- Dates: August 29, 1970
- Locations: Winnipeg, Manitoba
- Years active: 1970
- Website: Festival at the Manitoba Music Museum

The Man-Pop Festival was a music festival held in Winnipeg, Manitoba, on August 29, 1970. Led Zeppelin was the headlining act at the event. Other artists performing at the festival included The Youngbloods, The Ides of March, Iron Butterfly, Chilliwack, plus local bands, including Dianne Heatherington and The Merry Go Round plus Sugar ‘n Spice

The Man-Pop Festival was originally scheduled to take place at the outdoor Winnipeg Stadium. However, a summer rain storm tore down the awning protecting the stage soaking the PA system and amps, which forced the organizers to belatedly move the festival into the nearby Winnipeg Arena. This venue had lower capacity than that of the stadium, and when this capacity was reached, some 800 valid ticket holders were refused admission. This caused a near riot at the entrances of the arena, with many of its glass doors being kicked in by angry patrons.

Tickets for the festival cost $5.50 to $12.50. Led Zeppelin's fee was $50,000. Because of the delays caused by the change of venues, Led Zeppelin did not actually take the stage until the early hours of the morning, and did so voluntarily, since they had already been paid pursuant to a rain clause in their original contract. It was through the exhortations of local singer Dianne Heatherington, whose national reputation came later, that Led Zeppelin was finally persuaded to perform.

== See also ==
- List of historic rock festivals
