= Bath Festival of Blues =

1969 English music festival

- Genre: Blues,
- Dates: Saturday 28 June 1969
- Locations: Pavilion Recreational Ground in Bath, Somerset, England
- Years active: 1969
- Founders: Freddy Bannister and Wendy Bannister
- Attendance: 30,000+
- Capacity: 30,000

The Bath Festival of Blues was a music festival held at the Bath Pavilion Recreational Ground in Bath, Somerset, England, on Saturday 28 June 1969. It featured a lineup of British blues bands, including Fleetwood Mac (the headliners), John Mayall's Bluesbreakers, Ten Years After, Led Zeppelin, The Nice, Chicken Shack, Jon Hiseman's Colosseum, Mick Abrahams' Blodwyn Pig and Principal Edwards Magic Theatre amongst others.

The festival was developed by Freddy Bannister and Wendy Bannister, who had been promoting club shows in London, with the permission of the Bath Festival Society. The festival was organised very simply with tables at the gates and screens to prevent people getting in for free, all the bands used the Pavilion as a back stage area. However, despite the very limited security the fans did not present a hazard and were generally well behaved.

The festival proved very popular, selling out all 30,000 tickets in the first week, surprising both the townsfolk and the promoters. The only major problem occurred when The Nice's use of bagpipers caused the stage to collapse and had to be repaired. The festival was well received and both the promoters and the Bath Chamber of Commerce were keen to put on another festival the next year, becoming the Bath Festival of Blues and Progressive Music and reinviting both many of the same acts back and other bigger names, especially from the United States.

For festival-goer Konrad Mallison, it provided the inspiration for his own Pop & Blues Festival Essen in 1969 and 1970.

== See also ==
- List of blues festivals
- List of historic rock festivals
- List of music festivals in the United Kingdom
