= The Shag =

American garage/psychedelic rock band

- Also known as: The Shags; Shag
- Origin: Milwaukee, Wisconsin, United States
- Genres: Garage rock, psychedelic rock
- Years active: 1964–1971
- Labels: Raynard, Capitol
- Past members: Paul Greenwald; John Sahli (1964-65); Mike Lamers; Don Luther; Ray McCall (1965-68); Gordon Elliott (1968-71)

The Shag (originally known as The Shags and later simply as Shag) were an American garage and psychedelic rock band in the 1960s, best known for their 1967 single "Stop and Listen". They were one of numerous bands at the time using the name "The Shags".

== Background ==
The Shags were formed in Milwaukee, Wisconsin, in 1964 by Paul "Green" Greenwald (drums, flute, congas, vocals), John Sahli (guitar, harmonica, vocals), Mike Lamers (guitar, congas, autoharp, percussion, vocals), and Don Luther (bass guitar, percussion, vocals). At first, they played folk and blues music, soon influenced by bands such as The Rolling Stones to develop a harder rock sound. They started playing at parties, schools and small bars, before gaining a manager, Paul Pattengale, and residencies first at DaQuisto's and later at O'Brad's club in Milwaukee. They also toured in the southeastern Wisconsin area. In 1965, they recorded a single, "Dance Woman" / "Cause I Love You", for the local Raynard label.

Sahli left the band in 1965 for a career in commercial design, and was replaced by Ray McCall (guitar, keyboard, vocals). The band increasingly performed their own material, and developed a reputation for outlandish costumes and special effects. In 1967, they were signed by Capitol Records and recorded "Stop and Listen" / "Melissa". "Stop and Listen" was written and sung by McCall and featured his fuzz guitar. It has been cited as one of the first anti-drug rock songs to be recorded. The record was credited to The Shag (without the final "s"), to avoid confusion with another group of the same name.

McCall left in 1968 and was replaced by Gordon Elliott (guitar, harmonica, congas, vocals). The band then moved to Marin County, California, and started playing major venues and ballrooms in support of bands such as Jefferson Airplane and The Who. They recorded material in San Francisco for an album, which went unreleased at the time. As Shag, they also appeared in July 1969 at the Midwest Rock Festival in Milwaukee, on a bill which also featured Led Zeppelin, Blind Faith, The MC5, Jethro Tull and many others.

The band split up in 1971. Elliott then formed an unrecorded band, Elixir, with George Edwards and Michael Tegza of the band H. P. Lovecraft.

In the 1990s and later, "Stop and Listen" was included on several CD compilations of 1960s garage band recordings, including Boulders, Volume 1 and Highs in the Mid-Sixties, Volume 10. An album of the band's 1969 recordings, Shag, was released on Gear Fab records in 2005.
