= Strawberry Fields (Canadian festival) =

1970 rock music festival

- Genre: Rock music,
- Dates: August 7-August 10, 1970
- Locations: Canadian Tire Motorsport Park in Bowmanville, Ontario, Canada
- Founders: John Brower
- Attendance: ~75,000 (est.)

The Strawberry Fields Festival was a rock music festival held at Canadian Tire Motorsport Park (formerly Mosport Park) in Bowmanville, Ontario, Canada, about 100 kilometres east of Toronto, between August 7 and the early morning hours of August 10, 1970. Although accounts vary, the audience has been estimated at between 75,000 and 100,000 people. A three-day ticket for the festival sold for $15.00.

== History ==
=== Connection to Toronto Peace Festival ===
John Brower along with John Lennon and Yoko Ono had originally planned to host the "Toronto Peace Festival" at Mosport Park in July 1970 but they ran into numerous roadblocks and their plans were dashed when their application for the necessary permits were denied. In de-classified documents released in 2007 it was revealed in an RCMP report dated December 30, 1969, that the Canadian security service began spying on ex-Beatle John and Yoko after they announced their plans for the Peace Festival.

=== Selection of the venue and promotion ===
Without John and Yoko, Brower moved forward with plans to host a festival at Shediac, near Moncton, New Brunswick, named the "Strawberry Fields Festival". Again, local politicians intervened and revoked various permits so Brower shifted the location back to Mosport Park in Ontario only this time he thinly disguised the event as a championship motorcycle race featuring "some contemporary entertainment". The festival was advertised in Canada as the "First Annual Strawberry Cup Trophy Race". To avoid public and political scrutiny, the musical entertainment aspect of the event was downplayed in advertisements and the festival was not promoted heavily in Canada.

When it was discovered that the primary focus of the event was not motorcycle racing but instead a rock music festival, the Attorney General of Ontario, Arthur Wishart, filed for an injunction to stop the festival from taking place citing health and public safety concerns. On August 6, with only hours to go before the opening act was scheduled to take the stage, Supreme Court Justice D. A. Keith refused to grant the injunction and the festival was allowed to proceed.

Unlike in Canada, the "Strawberry Fields Festival" was promoted heavily in the U.S. as a three-day rock music festival with the slogan, "Love, Sun and Sound". As a result, a large percentage of the attendees were from the American northeast. Others travelled from as far away as California and Florida. In the end, the sanctioning body for the racing series withdrew its drivers from the event so an actual race never occurred although an obligatory lap by a few motorcyclists did occur in order to comply with the local ordinance.

=== Border troubles ===
Several thousand more young American music fans were turned back at the Canada–US border by Canadian border agents. The fans were unable to provide proof they had sufficient funds to look after themselves while visiting Canada or produce adequate identification. Forty US dollars were required to be shown to officials (at the Thousand Islands Bridge crossing checkpoint). If one could not show cash they were told they could not enter Canada. Cash was sometimes borrowed from person to person at the lineup. One person turned away at the Canadian border crossing at Prescott, Ontario, drowned while attempting to swim into Canada across the St. Lawrence River near Watertown, New York. Several arrests related to the attempted importation of narcotics and banned substances were made.

=== The park ===
Mosport is a 500-acre (2.0 km^{2}) auto racing venue. Strawberry Fields was the first of three major music festivals held at Mosport Park Raceway, between 1970 and 1980. The other two were Canada Jam held August 26, 1978 and the punk and new wave themed Heatwave Festival held August 23, 1980.

== Performers ==
Strawberry Festival acts included (not in order of appearance):

- Procol Harum
- José Feliciano
- Ten Years After
- Delaney & Bonnie & Friends
- Grand Funk Railroad
- The Youngbloods
- Jethro Tull
- Melanie
- Hog Heaven
- The Freedom Express
- Leigh Ashford
- FAT
- James Ambrose
- Mountain
- Cactus
- Syrinx
- Crowbar featuring King Biscuit Boy
- Luke & The Apostles
- Lighthouse
- Chakra
- Alice Cooper
- Sly and the Family Stone
- Papa Grey

Led Zeppelin and Leonard Cohen were listed on the bill but did not appear. The festival concluded at 5:30 am on Monday morning, August 10 with a performance by Woodstock alumni Sly & the Family Stone, playing, "I Wanna Take You Higher", as the sun came up. Other performers who also appeared at the 1969 Woodstock Festival in Bethel, New York included Melanie, Ten Years After and Mountain. Chip Monck, who designed the stage lighting for Woodstock and became the impromptu emcee of that event, had planned to emcee Strawberry Fields, but the various changes in dates and venues pushed the festival into August and Monck was bound to honour a previous commitment to work the Rolling Stones European tour at that time.

== See also ==
- List of historic rock festivals
