= Leonard Stogel =

American music executive (1934–1979)

- Leonard Stogel
- Born: September 23, 1934; New York City, U.S.
- Died: May 25, 1979 (aged 44); Des Plaines, near O'Hare International Airport, Illinois, U.S.
- Cause of death: Plane crash

Leonard Stogel (September 23, 1934 – May 25, 1979) was an American music business manager, promoter, record producer and executive for the music festivals California Jam, California Jam II, and Canada Jam. He also managed Sweathog, the Cowsills, Sam the Sham, Tommy James & the Shondells, Lee Michaels, Napoleon XIV, the Royal Guardsmen, Boyce and Hart, and other musical groups. He was killed in the crash of American Airlines Flight 191 on May 25, 1979. Stogel's parents, Julius and Doris (Eisenberg) Stogel, had perished on American Airlines Flight 1 on March 1, 1962.
