= Grim Reapers Motorcycle Club (USA) =

American motorcycle club

Grim Reapers MC
- Abbreviation: GRMC
- Founded: 1965; 61 years ago
- Founded at: Louisville, Kentucky, U.S.
- Type: Outlaw motorcycle club
- Headquarters: Louisville, Kentucky, U.S.
- Region served: Midwestern and Southeastern United States
- Members: 100–200
- Website: Official website

Grim Reapers Motorcycle Club is an American outlaw motorcycle club founded in Louisville, Kentucky, in 1965. The club is primarily active in the Southeastern United States and only accepts Harley-Davidson riders.

== History ==
The Grim Reapers MC was founded as a three-piece patch in Louisville, Kentucky, in 1965. In the United States, such motorcycle clubs are considered "outlaw" as they are not sanctioned by the American Motorcyclist Association (AMA) and do not observe the AMA's rules. Instead the Grim Reapers have their own set of bylaws based on the values of outlaw biker culture. In 1970, the club provided security for the Kickapoo Creek Rock Festival, held on Memorial Day weekend in 1970 near Heyworth, Illinois.

== Insignia ==
The Grim Reapers MC takes its name and iconography from the symbolic personification of death, the Grim Reaper. The club's name is emblazoned on the top rocker of the three-piece patch. The center patch features the Grim Reaper in red holding a scythe, and is referred to as "the Ghost." The territory where the chapter operates appears on the bottom rocker. An "MC" patch appears to the right of the Ghost, when facing the cut. The cut also features a triangular front patch depicting a scythe over the club's initials, with one letter of the MC's motto, "FTW", in each corner of the triangle.

== Membership ==
The Grim Reapers' membership, conduct and operations are governed by national bylaws. In order to qualify for membership, applicants must be White males aged 18 or over who own an American-made motorcycle of at least 1000cc (usually a Harley-Davidson). Drug addicts are forbidden from joining the club. Prospective members must serve a probationary period as a "prospect", during which time they are subjected to intense physical and psychological punishment. In order to prove they are not members of law enforcement, prospects may be required to commit crimes and provide information for a next of kin.

Members are required to attend two mandatory national "runs" and two regional runs each year. After three years of membership, club members are entitled to sport a Grim Reapers tattoo on their arm, and after eights years, a club back tattoo. Members must pay 10% of any profits made from illegal activity to their chapter treasurer as a "road tax"; this money is split between national, regional and chapter treasuries. The club's membership has varied in size from 70 to 200.

== Organization ==
The Grim Reapers have chapters in the U.S. states of Tennessee, Iowa, Illinois, Kentucky, Ohio and Indiana. The club's "mother chapter" is located in Louisville, Kentucky. Each chapter is governed by an officer corps consisting of a president, vice president, secretary/treasurer, and sergeant-at-arms, or "enforcer", who report to regional officers of the club's northern region or southern region. These regions are overseen by a national officers corps headed by a national president who is elected to a two-year term. Chapter clubhouses, which are typically residences in remote or well-fortified areas, are used to host club meetings.

== Criminal allegations and incidents ==
The Grim Reapers are considered by law enforcement to be among the many second-tier, after the "Big Four", outlaw motorcycle gangs. Members are involved in drug distribution, motorcycle theft, money laundering, mail fraud and firearms violations. The Grim Reapers are allied with the Outlaws and have alleged ties to the Ku Klux Klan (KKK) and state militia groups.

The Grim Reapers formed a chapter in Warrick County, Indiana in the mid-1970s, which eventually established a clubhouse in a former antiques shop on State Street in Newburgh. Due to restrictions on the building's occupancy put in place by local authorities, the club moved its headquarters to a riverfront premises in downtown Newburgh. After fielding complaints about the Grim Reapers from local residents, the Warrick County sheriff's office raided the clubhouse along with officers of the Newburgh and Indiana State Police in September 1981. A small amount of marijuana, 187 cans of beer and several weapons were confiscated, and fifteen Grim Reapers members were arrested, although charges were ultimately dropped against all but two of the bikers. The club sold the Newburgh clubhouse in June 1982 and relocated to Evansville, where it purchased a house on Indiana Street in June 1983. The Evansville Grim Reapers chapter continued to operate from this property until September 2017, when it relocated to the former Exotic She Lounge on East Diamond Avenue.

On August 21, 1983, Grim Reapers member Stephen Earl Thomasson was stabbed to death in a fight behind the Red Garter Tavern in Evansville after he had shot a man in the foot. His funeral on August 23, 1983, was attended by round 200 members of the Grim Reapers and the Outlaws.

In 1999, charges were brought against 18 members of the club, including the national president, as part of the four-year "Operation Iron Horse", a state and federal investigation under the Racketeer Influenced and Corrupt Organizations Act (RICO Act) into motorcycle clubs in the Mid-West of the United States. The 18 defendants were indicted for selling drugs and dealing stolen motorcycles. The Grim Reapers had purchased 120 kilograms of cocaine worth a total of around $3 million from 1988 to 1998.

== See also ==
- Motorcycling
