= Freddy Bannister =

British concert promoter (1934–2019)

Freddy Bannister (3 December 1934 – 11 August 2019), sometimes written as Freddie Bannister, was a leading British concert promoter during the 1960s and 1970s, and was the founder of the Bath Festival of Blues 1969, the Bath Festival of Blues and Progressive Music 1970 and the Knebworth festivals.

Bannister started promoting music acts through his father-in-law in 1959, organising performances in local dance halls. From 1963 to 1969 he promoted numerous shows at the Pavilion in Bath, England including those by artists such as Gene Vincent, The Rolling Stones, Cream, The Beatles, Jimi Hendrix, The Who, Pink Floyd and The Yardbirds.

His first festival event was the Bath Festival of Blues which was held on the Rec Ground in the centre of Bath in 1969. The following year, the Festival (now known as the Bath Festival of Blues and Progressive Music) was moved by Bannister to the much larger Bath and West Showground, attracting an audience of between 150,000 and 200,000.

Following his departure from Bath, Bannister founded the Knebworth Festival in 1974 and ran what would be the first of seven consecutive festivals there. These festivals were headlined by The Allman Brothers in 1974, Pink Floyd in 1975, The Rolling Stones and Lynyrd Skynyrd in 1976, Genesis in June 1978, Frank Zappa and Peter Gabriel in September 1978, and Led Zeppelin in 1979 (two concerts). Bannister's concert promotion company, known as Tredoar, was forced into liquidation in the early 1980s due to a financial dispute with the management of Led Zeppelin following the 1979 festival.

Bannister was noted for his philosophy of "always giving the very best value for money" by keeping festival tickets at a reasonable cost, whilst also attempting to book the strongest program possible. He specialised in working with American bands, including Jefferson Airplane, Santana, Johnny Winter, Steppenwolf, Canned Heat, Country Joe, Hot Tuna, The Flock, It's a Beautiful Day and Dr John. In addition, he was the European representative for Frank Zappa and the Mothers of Invention, and also Grunt Records, the Jefferson Airplane label which represented such artists as Hot Tuna, Jack Bonus and Black Kangaroo.

During the 1990s, Bannister and his wife Wendy ran Parkes Auctions, based at Sandown Park, Surrey, which was later complemented by a two-day classic and collectors car show at the same venue. In 1998 Parkes went out of business. The Sandown Park venue was subsequently taken over by Barons and has no connection with the Bannisters.

In 2003, Bannister released his autobiography, entitled There Must Be a Better Way, published by Bath Books.

He died of cancer on 11 August 2019 at the age of 84.
