= Wally =

Wally may refer to:

== People and fictional characters ==
- Wally (given name), a list of people and fictional characters
- Wally the Green Monster, mascot of the Boston Red Sox
- Water Wally, mascot of the Singapore's Public Utilities Board
- Wally (Wallabies mascot), the official mascot of the Australia national rugby union team

== Arts, entertainment, and media ==
- Wally (band), British prog rock band
  - Wally (album), a 1974 album by Wally
- La Wally, an opera by Alfredo Catalani
- Wally, an episode of the American TV series Highway to Heaven

== Businesses and organizations ==
- Wally's, an American convenience store chain
- Wally Yachts, a maritime design and manufacture company

== Other uses ==
- Wally (anonymous), a name often called out at British rock venues in the 1970s and early '80s
- The Wally, trophy given to NHRA national event race winners
- WALLY, a proposed rail service in southeast Michigan, United States
- The Wallies of Wessex, a group of people who squatted on ground close to Stonehenge in 1974
- Wally, a Cockney dialect name for a large gherkin or pickled cucumber
- Wally the Walrus, a walrus known for travelling long distances around the coast of Western Europe
- Wally (horse), an Argentine thoroughbred racehorse

== See also ==
- Walley, a list of people with the surname or given name
- Walley jump, a figure skating jump
- Wall-E 2008 film about a robot left to clean up garbage on an uninhabitable planet
- Whalley (disambiguation)
