= Whalley =

Whalley can mean:

== Places ==
- Whalley, Lancashire, England, a village
  - Whalley Abbey, a former Cistercian abbey
  - Whalley railway station
- Whalley, Surrey, neighbourhood and city centre in the city of Surrey, British Columbia, Canada
- Whalley Range, Blackburn
- Whalley Range, Manchester

== People ==
- Arthur Whalley (1886–1952), English footballer banned for life for match fixing
- Bert Whalley (1913–1958), English footballer and coach
- Boff Whalley (born 1961), former lead guitarist of the band Chumbawamba
- Duncan Whalley (born 1979), English cricketer
- Edward Whalley (c. 1607–c. 1675), an English military leader during the English Civil War
- Fred Whalley (1898–1976), English footballer
- Gareth Whalley (born 1973), English-born footballer who qualifies to play for the Republic of Ireland
- George Whalley (1915–1983), Canadian scholar, poet and naval officer, brother of Peter Whalley
- George Hammond Whalley (1813–1878), British lawyer and politician
- Gillian Whalley, New Zealand sonographer
- Hampden Whalley (1851–?), British politician and soldier, son of George Hammond Whalley
- J. Irving Whalley (1902–1980), American politician
- Joan Whalley (born 1927), Australian actress, teacher and artistic director
- Joan Whalley (footballer) (1921–1998), English female footballer
- Joanne Whalley (born 1961), English actress
- John Whalley (MP) (c. 1633–?), English Member of Parliament
- Lawrence Whalley (born c. 1921?), British psychologist and academic
- Michael Whalley (1953–2008), Republican member of the New Hampshire House of Representatives
- Norma Whalley, Australian-born actress on Broadway in 1899 and in film in the 1920s and 1930s
- Óscar Whalley (born 1994), Spanish footballer
- Paul E.S. Whalley (1930 2019) zoological abbreviation - Whalley
- Peter Whalley (1921–2007), Canadian cartoonist and sculptor
- Peter Whalley (clergyman) (1722–1791), English clergyman, academic and schoolmaster
- Richard Whalley (died 1583) (1498–1583), English Member of Parliament
- Richard Whalley (died c. 1632), English Member of Parliament
- Samuel Whalley (1800–1883), British Radical politician
- Selwyn Whalley (1934–2008), English footballer
- Shaun Whalley (born 1987), English footballer

== See also ==
- Walley, a list of people with the surname
- Wally (disambiguation)
- Whaley (disambiguation)
