= English Football Hall of Fame =

Hall of Fame in Manchester, England

Coordinates: 53.48583°N 2.24208°W

The English Football Hall of Fame is housed at the National Football Museum in Manchester, England. The Hall aims to celebrate and highlight the achievements of the all-time top English footballing talents, as well as non-English players and managers who have become significant figures in the history of the English game. New members are added each year, with an induction ceremony held in the autumn, formerly at varying locations, but exclusively at the Museum itself following its move to Manchester's Urbis building in 2012.

The Hall is on permanent display at the Museum. An accompanying book, The Football Hall of Fame: The Official Guide to the Greatest Footballing Legends of All Time, was first published in October 2005 by Robson Books. Authored by football historian Rob Galvin and the Museum's founding curator Mark Bushell, it is updated every year with the newest inductees, containing an in-depth profile about the career and reputation of each one, along with a select exhibit from the Museum which relates to their achievements.

== Selection panel ==
Members of the Hall of Fame are chosen by a panel. Initially, this consisted of ex-players Jimmy Armfield, Sir Trevor Brooking, Jimmy Hill, Mark Lawrenson and Gordon Taylor, all of whom had become professional pundits and/or senior figures in football after retiring.

In subsequent years, former England national team manager Graham Taylor and former England international Steve Hodge have also served stints on the panel, though it is now chiefly a grouping of eminent football historians. The current panel features Neil Carter, Tony Collins, Jeffrey Hill, Peter Holme, Dick Holt, John Hughson, Simon Inglis, Alexander Jackson, Gary James, Graham Kelly, Tony Mason, Kevin Moore, Martin Polley, Dil Porter, Dave Russell, Matthew Taylor, Jean Williams and John Williams.

All surviving inductees to the Hall are granted an additional place on the panel. Two players have been inducted as the 'Fans' Choice', following polls on the BBC Sport and Sky Sports websites.

== History ==
Initially, there were three main categories of induction; a mass of 'Players' and 'Managers' from the men's game, together with one figure from the women's game (Sir Alf Ramsey is noted as the only figure to date honoured in both of the main male categories). To be considered for induction, players must be either retired or at least 30 years of age. All inductees must also have played/managed for at least five years in England.

In 2007, two other regular categories were established. Chiefly, this was in recognition of football's central role in English culture, extending Hall of Fame honours to those who have contributed greatly to the English game outside the more obvious fields of play. The Community Champion category – sponsored by the Football Foundation – honours professional players who have donated their spare time and money to the grassroots level of the sport, while the Football for All Award – sponsored by The Football Association – is presented to pioneers of the various forms of football played by disabled people.

Since 2009, the Museum has also commemorated great teams from history alongside its awarding of individual players and coaches. The criteria for a team's induction is that they must have played at least a quarter of a century prior. 2013 saw the first induction of a referee (Jack Taylor), while 2017 saw the first induction of a figure from the football media.

On occasional circumstances there will also be a presentation of a 'special award', usually to mark significant anniversaries. Jimmy Hill is to date the sole recipient of an honour styled as a Lifetime Achievement Award, in celebration of his unusual polymathic career in the game.

On 27 February 2020 the Premier League announced plans to officially launch its Hall of Fame, with plans to induct its first two players on 19 March 2020. For one to be inducted in the Premier League Hall of Fame, it is a requirement that the player must be a retiree of the Premier League and only the player's Premier League career will be used for consideration for their candidacy.

== Inductees ==
Positions key
GK	Goalkeeper
DF	Defender
MF	Midfielder
FW	Forward

=== Men ===
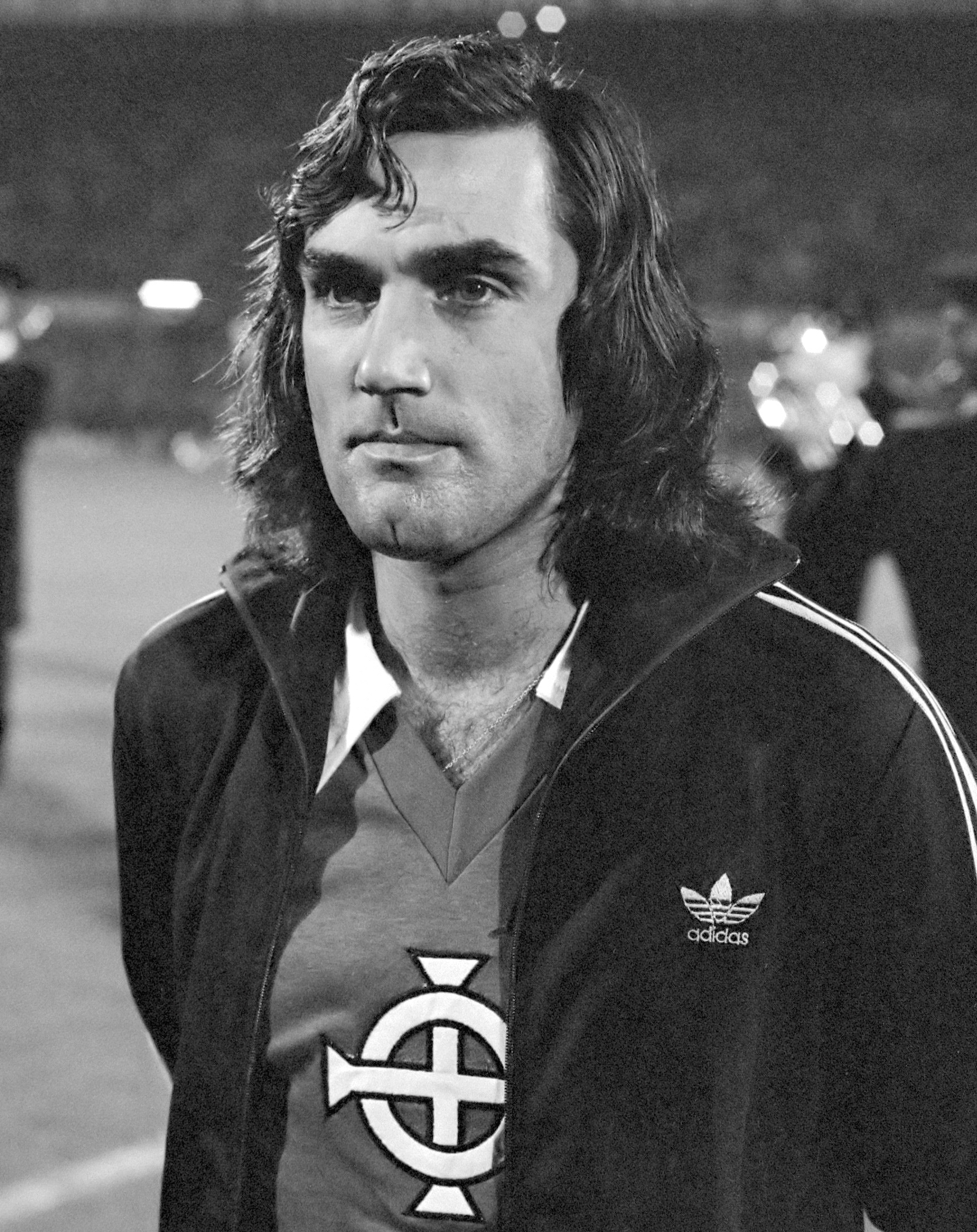
George Best, inducted in 2002

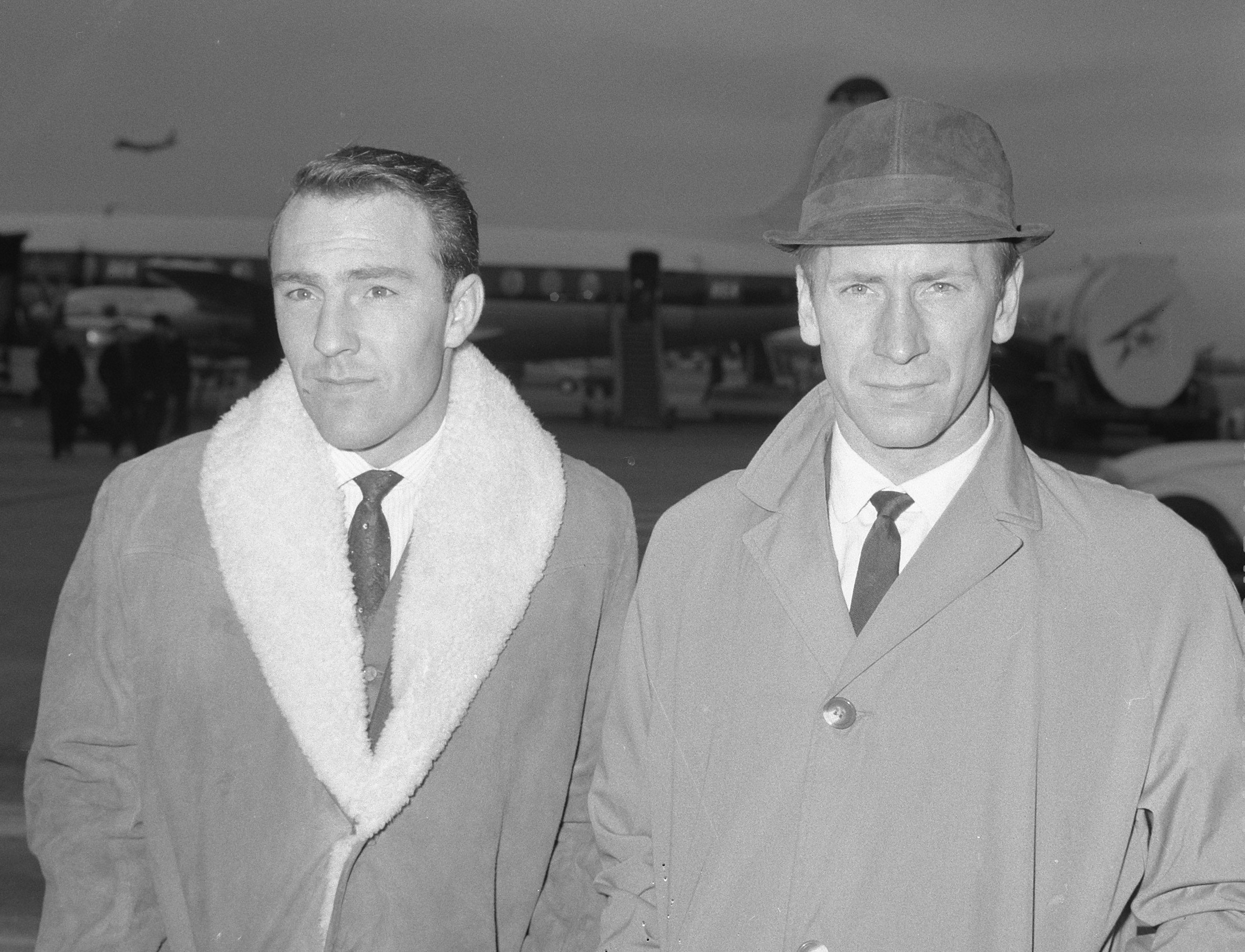
Jimmy Greaves and Bobby Charlton, both inducted in 2002

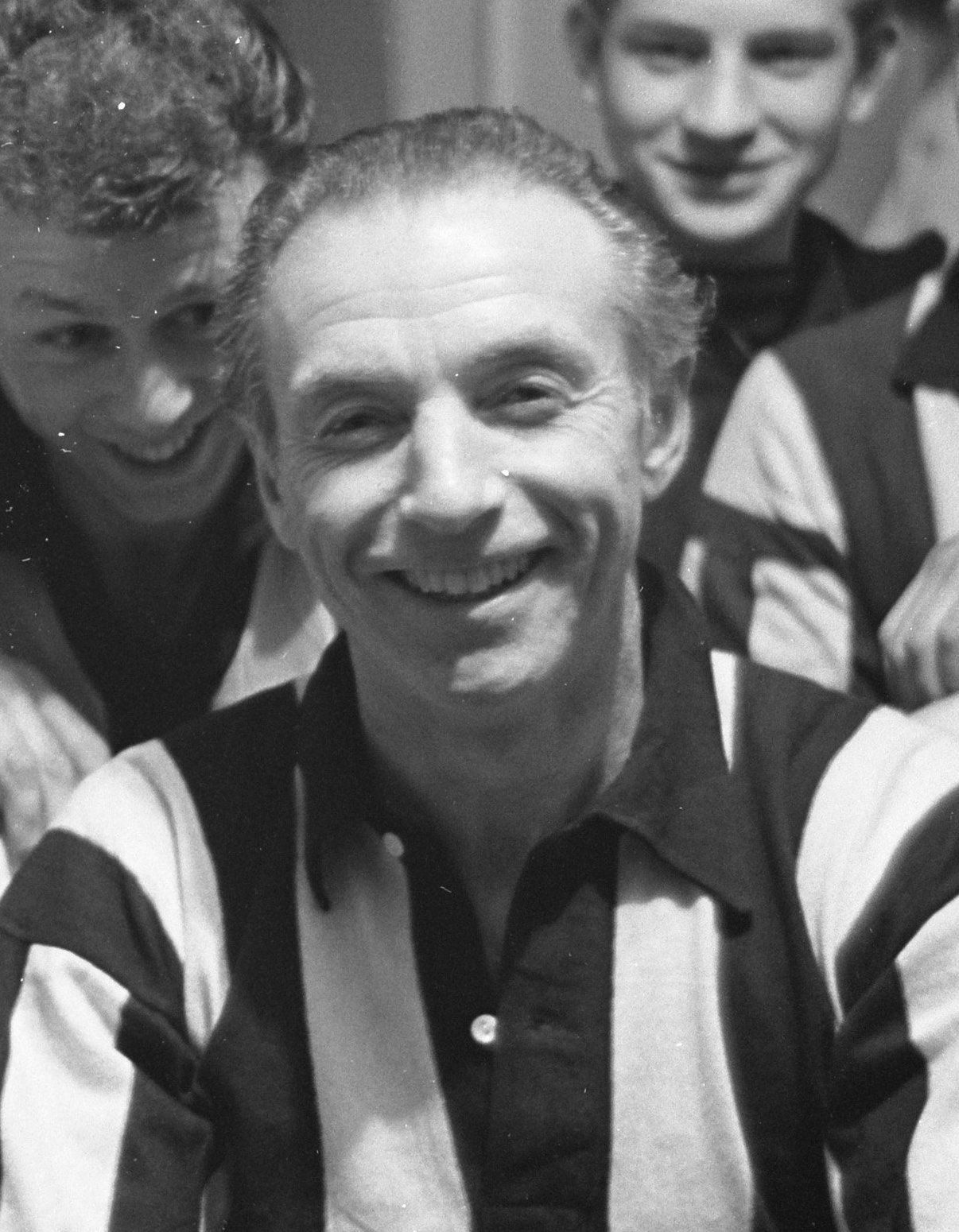
Stanley Matthews, inducted in 2002

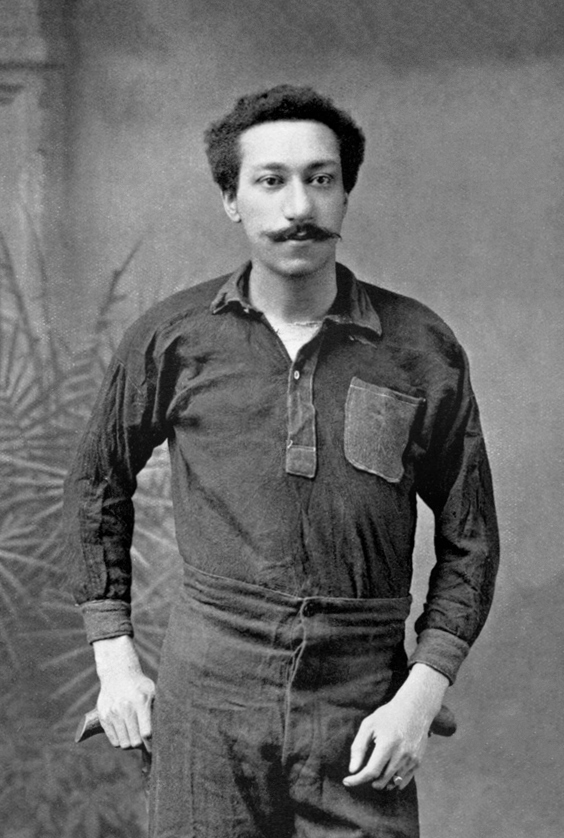
Arthur Wharton, inducted in 2003

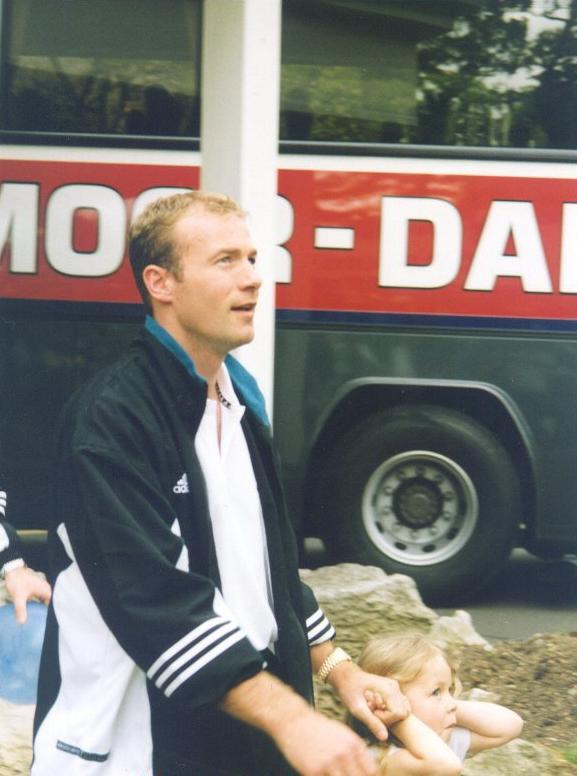
Alan Shearer, inducted in 2004

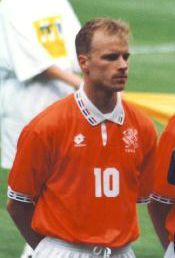
Dennis Bergkamp, inducted in 2007

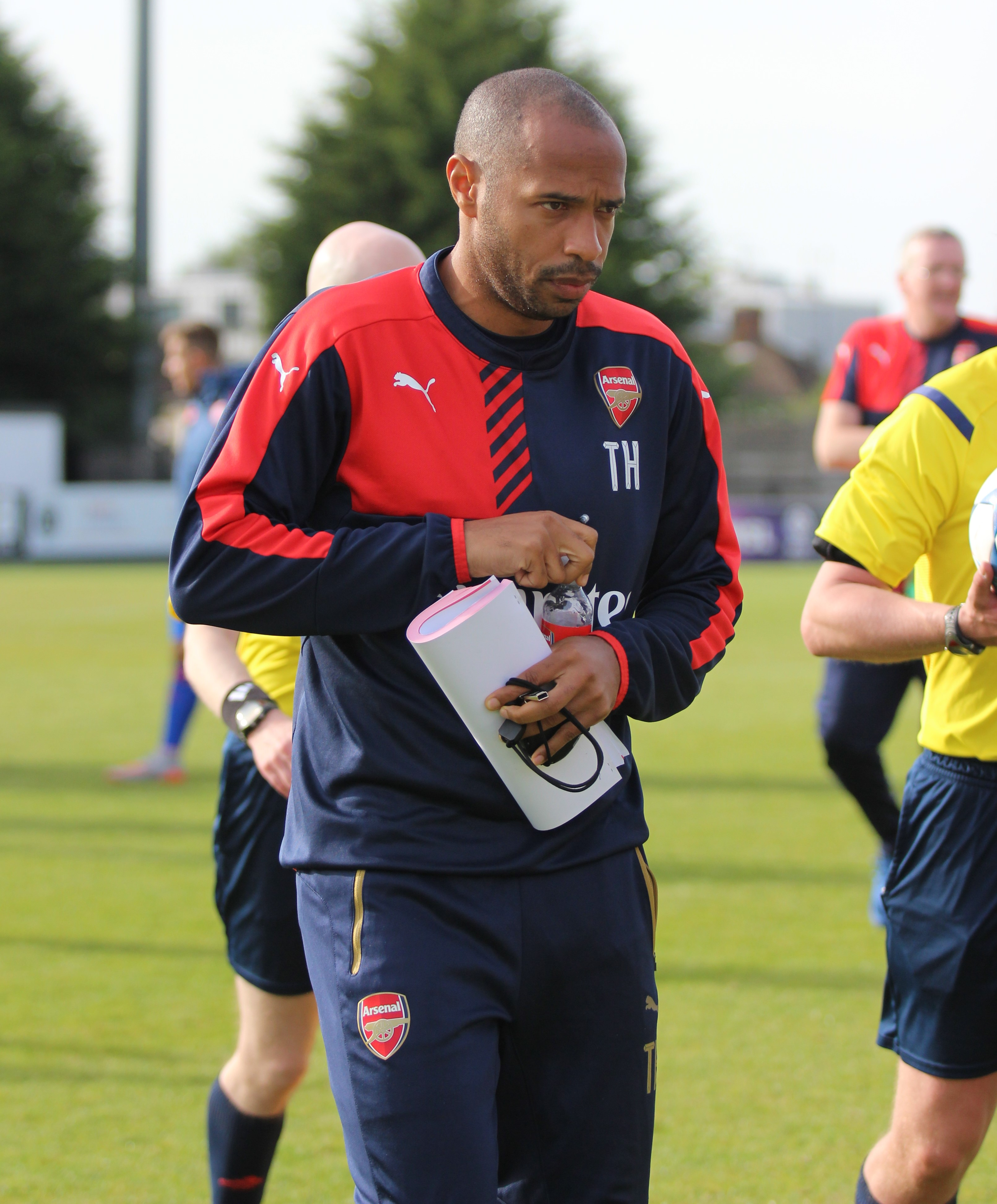
Thierry Henry, inducted in 2008

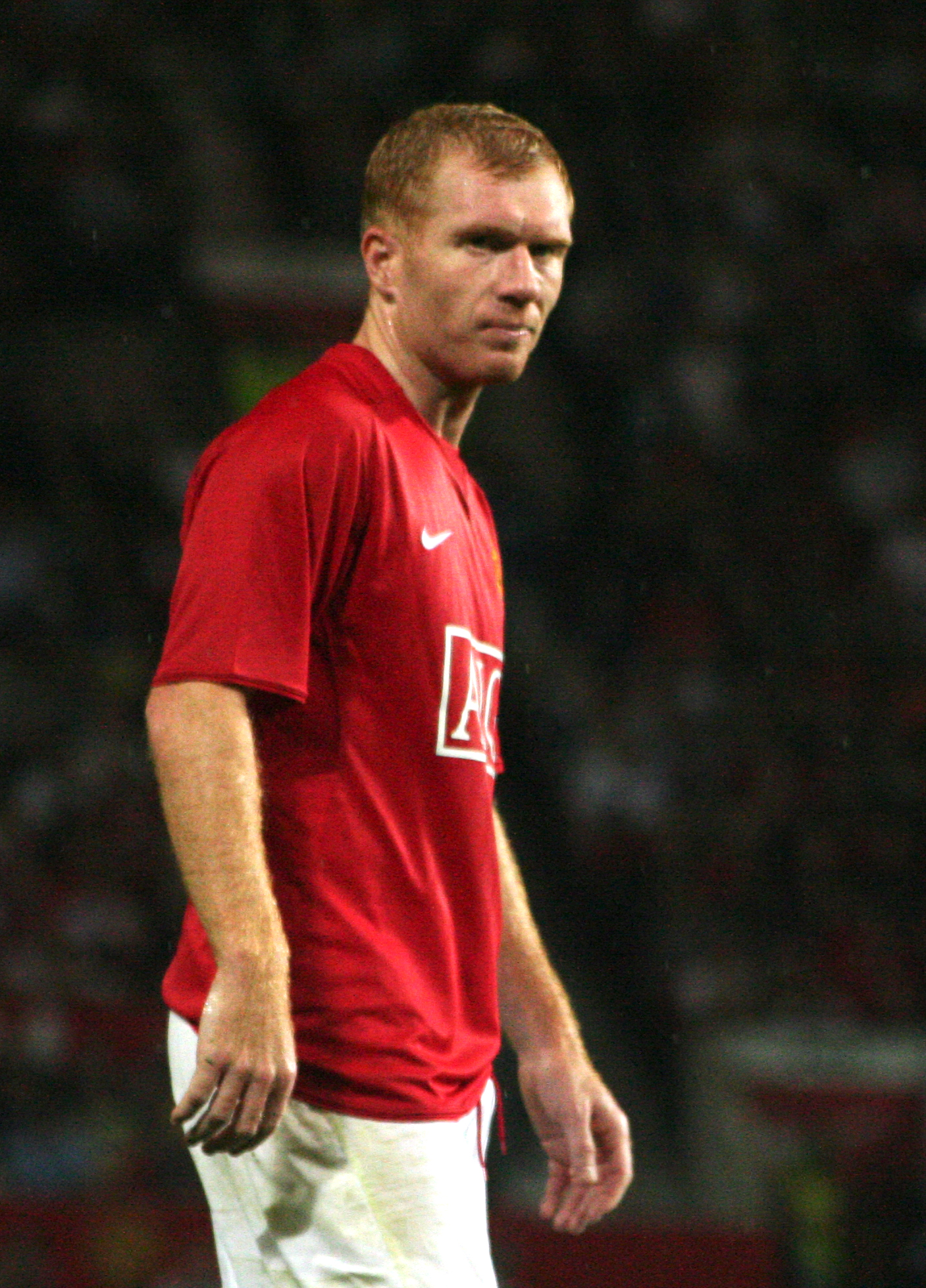
Paul Scholes, inducted in 2008

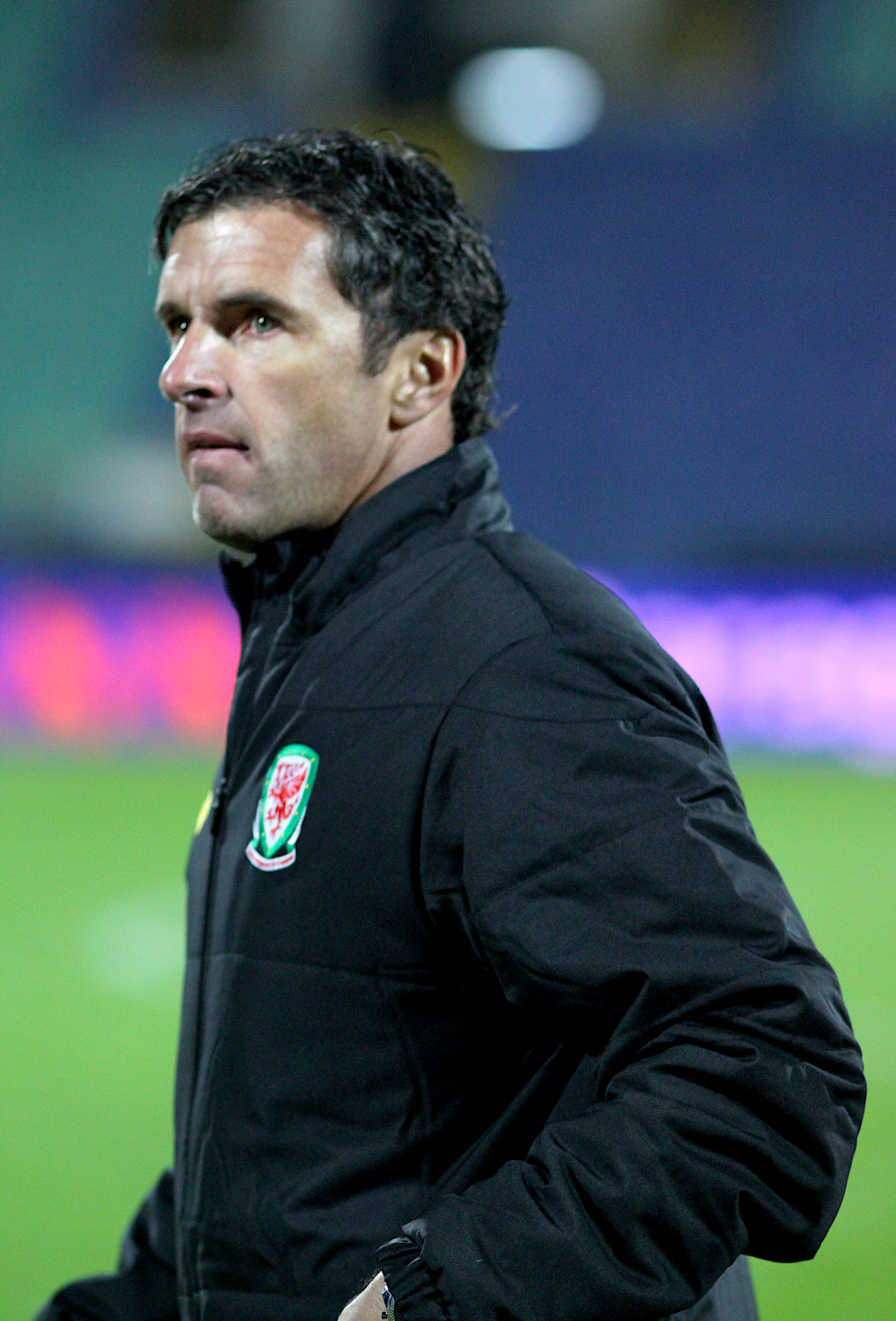
Gary Speed, inducted in 2017

Year	Name	Apps.	Goals	Pos.	Years	Clubs	Not.	Ref.
2002	(England) Gordon Banks	510	0	GK	1958–1973	Chesterfield (23), Leicester City (293), Stoke City (194)		
2002	(Northern Ireland) George Best	411	147	FW	1963–1983	Manchester United (361), Stockport County (3), Fulham (42), AFC Bournemouth (5)	(Note: Also played in 17 Scottish Football League matches for Hibernian.)	
2002	(France) Eric Cantona	174	74	FW	1992–1997	Leeds United (28), Manchester United (146)	(Note: Also played in 182 Ligue 1 matches for Auxerre, Marseille, Bordeaux, Montpellier and Nîmes.)	
2002	(Wales) John Charles	376	171	FW	1949–1966	Leeds United (308), Cardiff City (68)	(Note: Also played in 160 Serie A matches for Juventus and AS Roma.)	
2002	(England) Bobby Charlton	644	207	MF	1956–1975	Manchester United (606), Preston North End (38)	(Note: Also honoured with Presidency of the Museum.) (Note: Also played in 4 League of Ireland matches for Waterford, and played in 5 National Soccer League matches for Perth Azzurri and Blacktown City.)	
2002	(Scotland) Kenny Dalglish	355	118	FW	1977–1990	Liverpool	(Note: Also played in 204 Scottish Football League matches for Celtic.)	
2002	(England) Dixie Dean	438	379	FW	1923–1939	Tranmere Rovers (30), Everton (399), Notts County (9)	(Note: Also played in 7 League of Ireland matches for Sligo Rovers.)	
2002	(Northern Ireland) Peter Doherty	406	199	FW	1933–1953	Blackpool (83), Manchester City (122), Derby County (15), Huddersfield Town (83), Doncaster Rovers (103)		
2002	(England) Duncan Edwards	151	20	MF	1953–1958	Manchester United		
2002	(England) Tom Finney	433	187	FW	1946–1960	Preston North End	(Note: Also honoured with Vice-Presidency of the Museum)	
2002	(England) Paul Gascoigne	267	45	MF	1985–2004	Newcastle United (92), Tottenham Hotspur (92), Middlesbrough (41), Everton (32), Burnley (6), Boston United (4)	(Note: Also played in 41 Serie A matches for Lazio, and 74 Scottish Football League matches for Rangers.)	
2002	(England) Jimmy Greaves	516	357	FW	1957–1971	Chelsea (157), Tottenham Hotspur (321), West Ham United (38)	(Note: Also played in 12 Serie A matches for A.C. Milan)	
2002	(England) Johnny Haynes	594	146	FW	1952–1970	Fulham		
2002	(England) Kevin Keegan	500	170	FW	1968–1984	Scunthorpe United (124), Liverpool (230), Southampton (68), Newcastle United (78)	(Note: Also played in 90 Bundesliga matches for Hamburger SV.)	
2002	(Scotland) Denis Law	458	217	FW	1956–1974	Huddersfield Town (81), Manchester City (68), Manchester United (309)	(Note: Also played in 27 Serie A matches for Torino.)	
2002	(England) Nat Lofthouse	452	255	FW	1946–1960	Bolton Wanderers		
2002	(Scotland) Dave Mackay	416	48	DF	1959–1972	Tottenham Hotspur (268), Derby County (122), Swindon Town (26)	(Note: Also played in 135 Scottish Football League matches for Hearts.)	
2002	(England) Stanley Matthews	697	71	MF	1932–1965	Stoke City (318), Blackpool (379)		
2002	(England) Bobby Moore	668	25	DF	1958–1977	West Ham United (544), Fulham (124)		
2002	(England) Bryan Robson	569	114	MF	1975–1997	West Bromwich Albion (198), Manchester United (346), Middlesbrough (25)		
2002	(England) Peter Shilton	1005	1	GK	1966–1997	Leicester City (286), Stoke City (110), Nottingham Forest (202), Southampton (188), Derby County (175), Plymouth Argyle (34), Bolton Wanderers (1), Leyton Orient (9)		
2002	(England) Billy Wright	490	13	DF	1939–1959	Wolverhampton Wanderers		
2003	(England) Alan Ball	743	170	MF	1962–1983	Blackpool (146), Everton (208), Arsenal (177), Southampton (132), Bristol Rovers (17)		
2003	(Northern Ireland) Danny Blanchflower	553	27	DF	1949–1964	Barnsley (68), Aston Villa (148), Tottenham Hotspur (337)		
2003	(Northern Ireland) Pat Jennings	757	0	GK	1963–1985	Watford (48), Tottenham Hotspur (472), Arsenal (237)		
2003	(England) Tommy Lawton	390	231	FW	1936–1955	Burnley (25), Everton (87), Chelsea (42), Notts County (151), Brentford (50), Arsenal (35)		
2003	(England) Gary Lineker	340	192	FW	1978–1992	Leicester City (194), Everton (41), Tottenham Hotspur (105)	(Note: Also played in 103 La Liga matches for Barcelona, and 18 J1 League matches for Nagoya Grampus Eight.)	
2003	(England) Stan Mortensen	395	225	FW	1941–1958	Blackpool (317), Hull City (42), Southport (36)		
2003	(Denmark) Peter Schmeichel	350	1	GK	1991–2003	Manchester United (292), Aston Villa (29), Manchester City (29)	(Note: Schmeichel collected his Hall of Fame trophy in 2013, having missed his initial inauguration in 2003.) (Note: Also played in 197 Danish 1st Division for Hvidovre and Brøndby, and played in 55 Primeira Liga matches for Sporting CP.)	
2003	(England) Arthur Wharton	41	0	GK	1885–1902	Preston North End, Rotherham Town (34), Sheffield United (1), Stalybridge Rovers, Ashton North End, Stockport County (6)	(Note: Born in Jamestown, Gold Coast (now Accra, Ghana). Wharton moved to England aged 19, but he did not play for the national team.)	
2004	(England) Tony Adams	504	32	DF	1983–2002	Arsenal		
2004	(England) Viv Anderson	594	37	DF	1974–1995	Nottingham Forest (328), Arsenal (120), Manchester United (54), Sheffield Wednesday (70), Barnsley (20), Middlesbrough (2)		
2004	(Scotland) Billy Bremner	652	96	MF	1960–1982	Leeds United (586), Hull City (61), Doncaster Rovers (5)		
2004	(England) Geoff Hurst	529	212	FW	1958–1976	West Ham United (411), Stoke City (108), West Bromwich Albion (10)		
2004	(Republic of Ireland) Roy Keane	442	56	MF	1990–2005	Nottingham Forest (115), Manchester United (327)		
2004	(England) Wilf Mannion	357	100	FW	1936–1956	Middlesbrough (341), Hull City (16)		
2004	(England) Alan Shearer	560	284	FW	1988–2006	Southampton (118), Blackburn Rovers (139), Newcastle United (303)	(Note: Shearer collected his Hall of Fame trophy in 2014, having missed his initial inauguration in 2004.)	
2005	(England) John Barnes	589	155	MF	1981–1999	Watford (233), Liverpool (317), Newcastle United (27), Charlton Athletic (12)		
2005	(England) Colin Bell	476	142	MF	1963–1979	Bury (82), Manchester City (394)		
2005	(England) Jack Charlton	628	70	DF	1952–1973	Leeds United		
2005	(Wales) Ryan Giggs	672	114	MF	1990–2014	Manchester United	(Note: Giggs collected his Hall of Fame trophy in 2015, having missed his initial inauguration in 2005.)	
2005	(Scotland) Alex James	378	79	FW	1925–1937	Preston North End (147), Arsenal (231)		
2005	(West Germany) Bert Trautmann	508	0	GK	1949–1964	Manchester City	(Note: Born in Bremen, Germany. Trautmann's professional career began a few months after the creation of West Germany, but he did not play for the national team, despite the possibility to do so.)	
2005	(England) Ian Wright	493	235	FW	1985–2000	Crystal Palace (225), Arsenal (221), West Ham United (22), Nottingham Forest (10), Burnley (15)	(Note: Also played in 8 Scottish Premier League matches for Celtic.)	
2006	(Republic of Ireland) Liam Brady	324	51	MF	1973–1990	Arsenal (235), West Ham United (89)	(Note: Also played in 191 Serie A matches for Juventus, Sampdoria and Internazionale.)	
2006	(Scotland) Alan Hansen	434	8	DF	1977–1990	Liverpool	(Note: Also played in 86 Scottish Football League matches for Partick Thistle.)	
2006	(England) Roger Hunt	480	269	FW	1958–1972	Liverpool (404), Bolton Wanderers (76)		
2006	(England) Jackie Milburn	353	177	FW	1943–1957	Newcastle United		
2006	(England) Martin Peters	722	175	MF	1959–1981	West Ham United (302), Tottenham Hotspur (189), Norwich City (207), Sheffield United (24)		
2006	(Wales) Ian Rush	572	246	FW	1978–1999	Chester City (34), Liverpool (471), Leeds United (36), Newcastle United (10), Sheffield United (4), Wrexham (17)	(Note: Also played in 29 Serie A matches for Juventus)	
2006	(Italy) Gianfranco Zola	229	59	FW	1996–2003	Chelsea	(Note: Also played in 281 Serie A matches for Napoli, Parma and Cagliari)	
2007	(England) Peter Beardsley	658	209	FW	1979–1999	Carlisle United (104), Newcastle United (276), Liverpool (131), Everton (81), Bolton Wanderers (17), Manchester City (6), Fulham (21), Hartlepool United (22)	(Note: Also played in 73 North American Soccer League matches for Vancouver Whitecaps.)	
2007	(Netherlands) Dennis Bergkamp	315	87	FW	1995–2006	Arsenal	(Note: Fans' Choice, in conjunction with BBC Sport.) (Note: Also played in 185 Eredivisie matches for Ajax, and played in 85 Serie A matches for Inter Milan.)	
2007	(England) Glenn Hoddle	473	90	MF	1975–1995	Tottenham Hotspur (378), Swindon Town (64), Chelsea (31)	(Note: Also played in 69 Ligue 1 matches for Monaco.)	
2007	(Wales) Mark Hughes	561	153	FW	1980–2002	Manchester United (346), Chelsea (95), Southampton (52), Everton (18), Blackburn Rovers (50)	(Note: Also played in 28 La Liga matches for Barcelona, and played in 18 Bundesliga matches for Bayern Munich.)	
2007	(Wales) Billy Meredith	670	164	FW	1894–1924	Manchester City (367), Manchester United (303)		
2007	(Scotland) Graeme Souness	423	60	MF	1972–1984	Middlesbrough (176), Liverpool (247)	(Note: Also played in 56 Serie A matches for Sampdoria, and played in 50 Scottish Football League matches for Rangers.)	
2007	(England) Nobby Stiles	414	20	DF	1960–1975	Manchester United (311), Middlesbrough (57), Preston North End (46)		
2008	(England) Jimmy Armfield	568	6	DF	1954–1971	Blackpool		
2008	(England) David Beckham	271	64	MF	1992–2003	Manchester United (266), Preston North End (5)	(Note: Also played in 116 La Liga matches for Real Madrid, played in 98 Major League Soccer matches for LA Galaxy, played in 29 Serie A matches for Milan, and in 10 Ligue 1 matches for Paris Saint-Germain.)	
2008	(England) Steve Bloomer	598	352	FW	1891–1914	Derby County (473), Middlesbrough (125)		
2008	(France) Thierry Henry	258	175	FW	1999–2012	Arsenal	(Note: Henry collected his Hall of Fame trophy at a special ceremony in 2011, having missed his initial inauguration in 2008.) (Note: Also played in 110 Ligue 1 matches for Monaco, played in 16 Serie A matches for Juventus, played in 80 La Liga matches for Barcelona, and played in 122 Major League Soccer matches for New York Red Bulls.)	
2008	(England) Emlyn Hughes	632	43	MF	1964–1984	Blackpool (28), Liverpool (474), Wolverhampton Wanderers (58), Rotherham United (56), Hull City (9), Swansea City (7)		(Note: Fans' Choice, in conjunction with Sky Sports.)
2008	(England) Paul Scholes	500	107	MF	1993–2013	Manchester United		
2008	(England) Ray Wilson	409	6	DF	1955–1971	Huddersfield Town (266), Everton (116), Oldham Athletic (25), Bradford City (2)		
2009	(Argentina) Ossie Ardiles	252	16	MF	1978–1990	Tottenham Hotspur (237), Blackburn Rovers (5), Queens Park Rangers (8), Swindon Town (2)	(Note: Also played in 129 Primera División matches for Belgrano and Huracán, and played in 14 Ligue 1 matches for Paris Saint-Germain.)	
2009	(England) Cliff Bastin	367	156	MF	1928–1947	Exeter City (17), Arsenal (350)		
2009	(England) Trevor Brooking	528	88	MF	1966–1984	West Ham United	(Note: Also honoured with Vice-Presidency of the Museum.)	
2009	(England) George Cohen	408	6	DF	1956–1969	Fulham		
2009	(Scotland) Frank McLintock	609	56	DF	1956–1977	Leicester City (168), Arsenal (314), Queens Park Rangers (127)		
2009	(England) Len Shackleton	384	128	FW	1940–1957	Bradford Park Avenue (7), Newcastle United (57), Sunderland (320)		
2009	(England) Teddy Sheringham	734	276	FW	1983–2008	Millwall (220), Aldershot (5), Nottingham Forest (42), Tottenham Hotspur (236), Manchester United (104), Portsmouth (32), West Ham United (76), Colchester United (19)		
2009	(England) Frank Swift	338	0	GK	1932–1950	Manchester City	(Note: Also played in 158 wartime league matches)	
2010	(England) Charlie Buchan	481	258	FW	1911–1928	Sunderland (379), Arsenal (102)		
2010	(England) Ian Callaghan	731	51	MF	1959–1982	Liverpool (640), Swansea City (76), Crewe Alexandra (15)		
2010	(England) Ray Clemence	758	0	GK	1965–1988	Scunthorpe United (48), Liverpool (470), Tottenham Hotspur (240)		
2010	(Republic of Ireland) Johnny Giles	557	101	MF	1959–1977	Manchester United (99), Leeds United (383), West Bromwich Albion (75)		
2010	(England) Francis Lee	500	228	FW	1960–1976	Bolton Wanderers (189), Manchester City (249), Derby County (62)		
2010	(England) Alf Ramsey	316	32	DF	1946–1955	Southampton (90), Tottenham Hotspur (226)		
2010	(England) Clem Stephenson	440	127	FW	1910–1928	Aston Villa (193), Huddersfield Town (248)		
2013	(England) Raich Carter	444	199	FW	1931–1952	Sunderland (245), Derby County (63), Hull City (136)		
2013	(Scotland) Eddie Gray	455	52	MF	1965–1984	Leeds United		
2013	(Wales) Cliff Jones	511	184	FW	1952–1970	Swansea Town (168), Tottenham Hotspur (318), Fulham (25)		
2013	(England) Matt Le Tissier	443	161	FW	1986–2002	Southampton		
2013	(England) Mike Summerbee	716	92	MF	1959–1979	Swindon Town (218), Manchester City (357), Burnley (51), Blackpool (3), Stockport County (87)		
2013	(England) Ray Wilkins	530	45	MF	1973–1997	Chelsea (179), Manchester United (160), Queens Park Rangers (183), Crystal Palace (1), Wycombe Wanderers (1), Millwall (3), Leyton Orient (3)	(Note: Also played 73 Serie A matches for A.C. Milan, played 13 Ligue 1 matches for Paris Saint-Germain, played in 86 Scottish Football League matches for Rangers and Hibernian)	
2014	(England) Trevor Francis	484	176	FW	1970–1994	Birmingham City (280), Nottingham Forest (70), Manchester City (26), Queens Park Rangers (32), Sheffield Wednesday (76)	(Note: Also played in 89 Serie A matches for Sampdoria and Atalanta, and played in 18 Scottish Football League matches for Rangers)	
2014	(Scotland) Hughie Gallacher	434	296	FW	1925–1939	Newcastle United (160), Chelsea (132), Derby County (51), Notts County (45), Grimsby Town (12), Gateshead (34)	(Note: Also played in 120 Scottish Football League matches for Queen of the South and Airdrieonians)	
2014	(Northern Ireland) Jimmy McIlroy	576	133	FW	1950–1968	Burnley (439), Stoke City (98), Oldham Athletic (39)		
2014	(England) Michael Owen	326	150	FW	1996–2013	Liverpool (216), Newcastle United (71), Manchester United (31), Stoke City (8)	(Note: Also played in 35 La Liga matches for Real Madrid.)	
2014	(France) Patrick Vieira	307	32	MF	1996–2011	Arsenal (279), Manchester City (28)	(Note: Also played in 49 Ligue 1 matches for Cannes, and played in 100 Serie A matches for Milan, Juventus and Inter Milan.)	
2015	(Wales) Ivor Allchurch	694	251	FW	1949–1968	Swansea Town (448), Newcastle United (143), Cardiff City (103)		
2015	(England) Bob Crompton	530	14	DF	1896–1919	Blackburn Rovers		
2015	(England) Norman Hunter	679	22	DF	1962–1983	Leeds United (540), Bristol City (108), Barnsley (31)		
2015	(Republic of Ireland) Paul McGrath	457	23	DF	1982–1998	Manchester United (163), Aston Villa (253), Derby County (24), Sheffield United (12)		
2015	(England) Alan Mullery	676	62	MF	1958–1972	Fulham (364), Tottenham Hotspur (312)		
2015	(England) Gary Neville	400	5	DF	1993–2011	Manchester United		
2015	(England) Stuart Pearce	571	72	DF	1983–2002	Coventry City (52), Nottingham Forest (402), Newcastle United (37), West Ham United (42), Manchester City (38)		
2016	(England) Rio Ferdinand	514	11	DF	1995–2015	West Ham United (127), AFC Bournemouth (10), Leeds United (54), Manchester United (312), Queens Park Rangers (11)		
2016	(Republic of Ireland) Denis Irwin	684	30	DF	1983–2004	Leeds United (72), Oldham Athletic (167), Manchester United (370), Wolverhampton Wanderers (75)		
2016	(Republic of Ireland) Mark Lawrenson	466	18	DF	1974–1988	Preston North End (73), Brighton & Hove Albion (152), Liverpool (241)		
2016	(Scotland) Billy Liddell	492	215	MF	1946–1961	Liverpool		
2016	(Scotland) John Robertson	470	64	MF	1970–1986	Nottingham Forest (398), Derby County (72)		
2016	(England) David Seaman	732	0	GK	1982–2004	Peterborough United (91), Birmingham City (75), Queens Park Rangers (141), Arsenal (406), Manchester City (19)		
2016	(Wales) Neville Southall	702	0	GK	1979–2000	Bury (39), Everton (579), Port Vale (9), Southend United (9), Stoke City (12), Torquay United (53), Bradford City (1)	(Note: Also honoured in 2008 as Everton supporters' "favourite performer in European games" at a one-off European Hall of Fame ceremony.)	
2016	(Scotland) Gordon Strachan	383	70	MF	1984–1997	Manchester United (160), Leeds United (197), Coventry City (26)	(Note: Also played in 252 Scottish Football League matches for Dundee and Aberdeen.)	
2017	(England) Billy Bonds	758	49	DF	1964–1988	Charlton Athletic (95), West Ham United (663)		
2017	(England) Steven Gerrard	503	120	MF	1998–2016	Liverpool	(Note: Also honoured in 2008 as Liverpool supporters' "favourite performer in European games" at a one-off European Hall of Fame ceremony.) (Note: Also played in 18 Major League Soccer matches for LA Galaxy.)	
2017	(England) Frank Lampard	620	178	MF	1995–2015	West Ham United (148), Swansea City (9), Chelsea (429), Manchester City (32)		
2017	(England) Charlie Roberts	374	28	DF	1903–1915	Grimsby Town (31), Manchester United (271), Oldham Athletic (72)		
2017	(Wales) Gary Speed	678	103	MF	1988–2010	Leeds United (249), Everton (58), Newcastle United (213), Bolton Wanderers (121), Sheffield United (37)		
2017	(Scotland) Bob Wilson	234	0	GK	1963–1974	Arsenal		
2019	(England) Cyrille Regis	610	159	FW	1977–1996	West Bromwich Albion (237), Coventry City (238), Aston Villa (52), Wolverhampton Wanderers (19), Wycombe Wanderers (35), Chester City (29)	(Note: Born in Maripasoula, French Guiana. Regis moved to England aged five, and was capped by the national team during the 1980s.)	
2020	(England) Justin Fashanu	261	78	FW	1978–1993	Norwich City (90), Nottingham Forest (32), Southampton (9), Notts County (64), Brighton & Hove Albion (16), Manchester City (2), West Ham United (2), Leyton Orient (5), Torquay United (41)	(Note: Fashanu did not play for the national team, but was capped at U21 level.)	
2021	(England) Terry Butcher	306	16	DF	1976–1993	Ipswich Town (271), Coventry City (6), Sunderland (38)	(Note: Also played in 127 Scottish Football League matches for Rangers.)	
2021	(England) Paul Ince	555	62	MF	1986–2007	West Ham United (72), Manchester United (206), Liverpool (65), Middlesbrough (93), Wolverhampton Wanderers (115), Swindon Town (3), Macclesfield Town (1)	(Note: Also played in 54 Serie A matches for Inter Milan.)	
2021	(England) Walter Tull	115	11	MF	1908–1914	Tottenham Hotspur (10), Northampton Town (105)	(Note: Tull was born in Folkestone, but he did not play for the national team in his playing career and was killed in action during the First World War.) (Note: Also played as an amateur for Clapton from 1908 to 1909.)	
2023	(Belgium) Vincent Kompany	265	18	DF	2008–2019	Manchester City	(Note: Also played in 29 Bundesliga matches for Hamburger SV and 88 Belgian Pro League matches for Anderlecht.)	
2023	(England) Jack Leslie	384	133	FW	1921–1935	Plymouth Argyle	(Note: Also played as an amateur for Barking Town from 1920 to 1921.)	
2024	(England) Brendon Batson	345	7	DF	1971–1982	Arsenal (10), Cambridge United (163), West Bromwich Albion (172)	(Note: Born in St. George's, Grenada. Batson moved to England aged nine, and was capped by the national team at B level.)	
2024	(England) Frank Soo	244	9	MF	1933–1948	Stoke City (173), Luton Town (71)	(Note: Also played semi-professionally for Prescot Cables and Chelmsford City, and played in the War League for Leicester City.) (Note: Of Chinese descent, Soo was born and raised in England, and was capped by the national team during wartime.)	
2025	(England) Ashley Cole	408	21	DF	1999–2019	Arsenal (156), Crystal Palace (14), Chelsea (229)	(Note: Also played 89 Major League Soccer matches for LA Galaxy and 11 Serie A matches for Roma.)	
2026	(England) George Eastham	525	74	MF	1953–1975	Newcastle United (124), Arsenal (207), Stoke City (194)	(Note: Began his career at Northern Irish club Ards, under the managership of his father, and also had a short stint with the Cleveland Stokers and a number of South African clubs.)	
2026	(England) Les Ferdinand	419	170	FW	1984–2006	Queens Park Rangers (163), Brentford (3), Newcastle United (68), Tottenham Hotspur (118), West Ham United (14), Leicester City (29), Bolton Wanderers (12), Reading (12)	(Note: Also played 24 Süper Lig matches for Beşiktaş.)	

=== Women ===
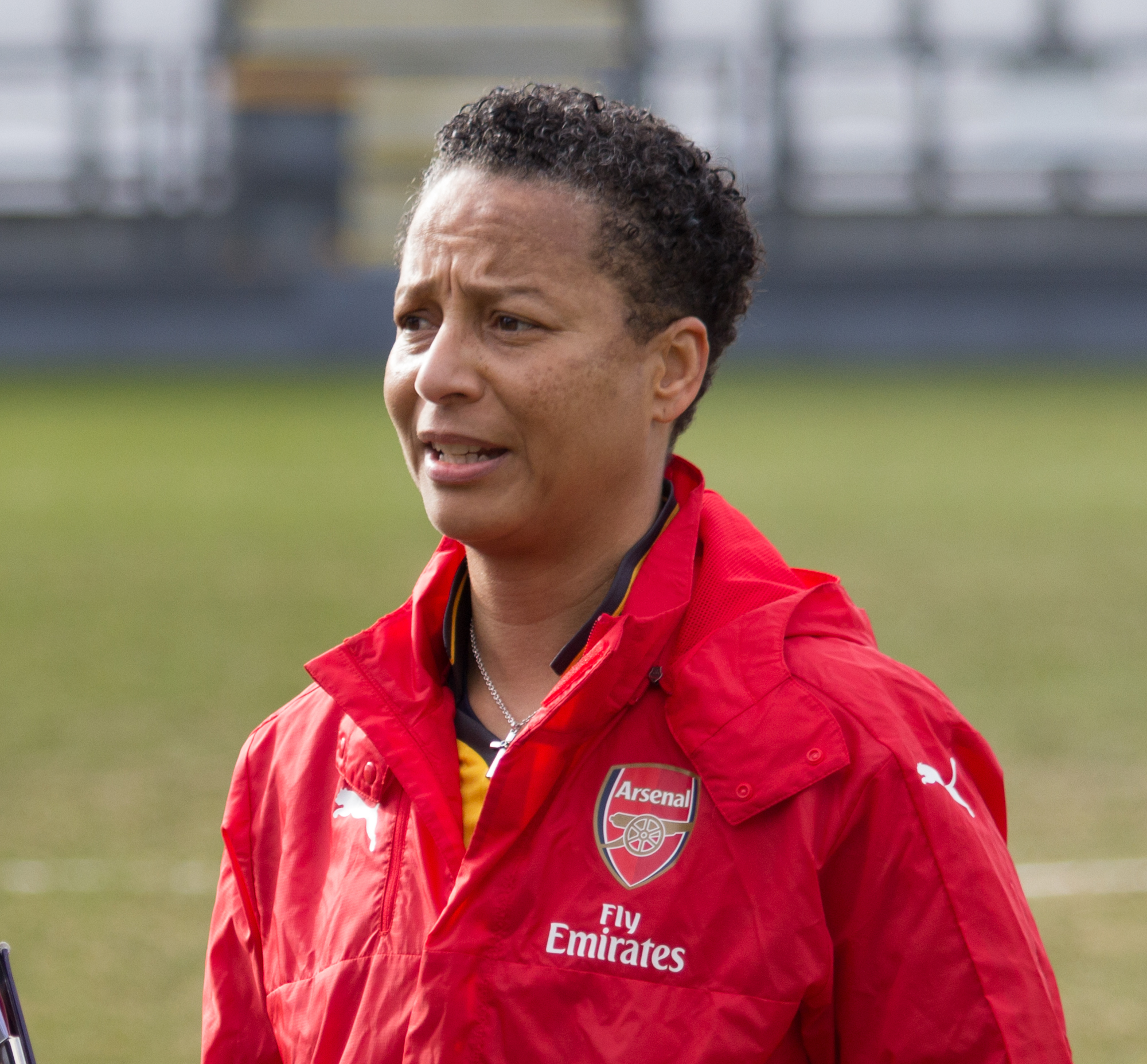
Hope Powell, inducted in 2003.

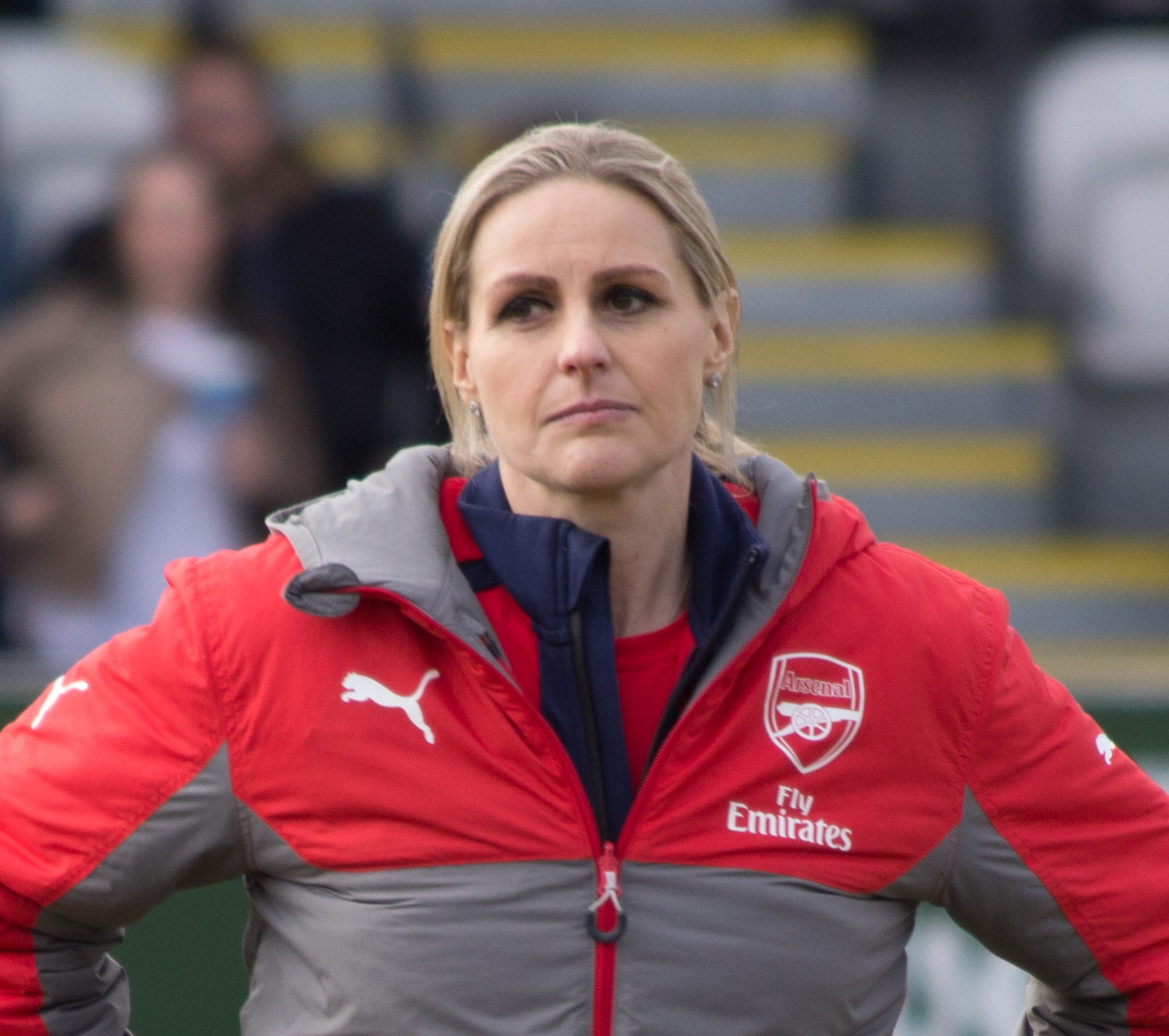
Kelly Smith, inducted in 2017.

Year	Name	Caps	Goals	Pos.	Years	Clubs	Not.	Ref.
2002	(England) Lily Parr	—N/a	—N/a	FW	1919–1951	Dick, Kerr Ladies	(Note: Also scored over 900 goals in her club career.)	
2003	(England) Hope Powell	66	35	MF	1978–1998	Millwall Lionesses, Friends of Fulham, Bromley Borough		
2004	(England) Sue Lopez	22	0	DF	1966–1985	Southampton		
2005	(England) Debbie Bampton	95	7	MF	1978–1997	Lowestoft, Howbury Grange, Millwall Lionesses, Wimbledon, Arsenal Ladies, Croydon, Doncaster Rovers Belles		
2006	(England) Gillian Coultard	119	30	MF	1976–2001	Doncaster Rovers Belles		
2007	(England) Karen Walker	83	40	FW	1985–2006	Doncaster Rovers Belles, Leeds United Ladies		
2007	(England) Joan Whalley	1	0	MF	1937–1956	Dick, Kerr Ladies		
2008	(England) Pauline Cope	60	0	GK	1982–2006	Millwall Lionesses, Arsenal Ladies, Charlton Athletic		
2009	(England) Marieanne Spacey	91	28	FW	1984–1996	Friends of Fulham, Arsenal Ladies		
2010	(England) Brenda Sempare	8	0	MF	1984–1997	Friends of Fulham, Croydon Ladies		
2013	(England) Sheila Parker	33	0	DF	1961–1980	Preston, Fodens, St. Helens, Chorley		
2014	(England) Sylvia Gore	2	1	MF	1956–1980	Manchester Corinthians, Fodens		
2015	(England) Faye White	90	12	DF	1996–2013	Arsenal Ladies		
2016	(England) Rachel Brown-Finnis	82	0	GK	1995–2014	Liverpool, Everton Ladies, Arsenal Ladies		
2016	(England) Rachel Unitt	102	8	DF	1998–2017	Wolves Women, Everton Ladies, Fulham Ladies, Leeds City Vixens, Birmingham City, Notts County, Solihull Moors, London Bees		
2017	(England) Kelly Smith	117	46	FW	1994–2017	Wembley Ladies, Arsenal Ladies		
2017	(England) Rachel Yankey	129	19	MF	1996–2016	Arsenal Ladies, Fulham Ladies, Birmingham Ladies, Notts County Ladies		
2019	(England) Alex Scott	140	12	DF	2002–2018	Arsenal Ladies, Birmingham City		
2021	(England) Karen Carney	144	32	MF	2001–2019	Birmingham City, Arsenal Ladies, Chelsea Women		
2021	(England) Carol Thomas	56	0	DF	1966–2009	BOCM, Reckitts, Hull Brewery, Tottenham Hotspur, Preston Rangers, CP Doncaster, Rowntrees, AFC Preston, Brandesburton		
2022	(England) Kerry Davis	82	44	FW	1982–1998	Crewe Alexandra, ROI Lazio, Trani 80, Napoli, Liverpool, Croydon		
2023	(England) Jill Scott	161	26	MF	2004–2022	Sunderland Women, Everton Ladies, Manchester City Women, Aston Villa Women		
2024	(England) Steph Houghton	121	13	DF	2002–2024	Sunderland Women, Leeds Carnegie, Arsenal Ladies, Manchester City Women		
2024	(England) Mary Phillip	65	0	DF	1992–2008	Millwall Lionesses, Fulham Ladies, Arsenal Ladies, Chelsea Ladies		
2025	(England) Eni Aluko	114	51	FW	2001–2019	Birmingham City Ladies, Charlton Athletic Women, Chelsea Women		
2026	(England) Ellen White	217	98	FW	2005–2022	Chelsea Ladies, Leeds Carnegie Ladies, Arsenal Ladies, Notts County Ladies, Birmingham City Ladies, Manchester City Women		

=== Managers ===
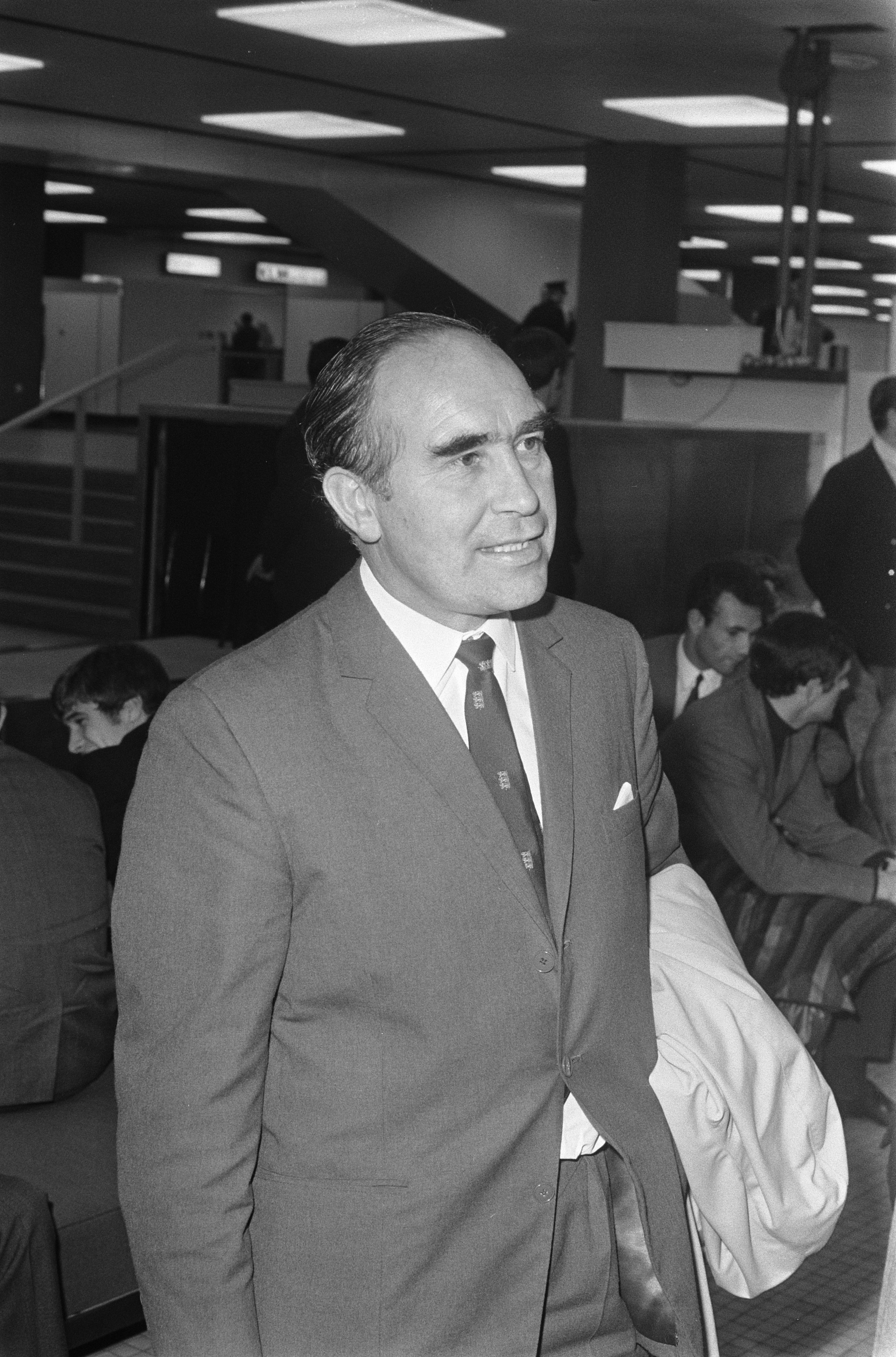
Alf Ramsey, inducted as a manager in 2002, and later as a player in 2010. He is the only person to be honoured as such.

Year	Name	Years	G	W	D	L	W%	Clubs	Not.	Ref.
2002	(Scotland) Matt Busby	1945–1971	1,141	576	263	292	0.505	Manchester United	(Note: Also managed Great Britain and Scotland.)	
2002	(England) Brian Clough	1965–1993	1,453	675	368	410	0.465	Hartlepools United, Derby County, Brighton & Hove Albion, Leeds United, Nottingham Forest		
2002	(Scotland) Alex Ferguson	1986–2013	2,155	1,253	490	412	0.581	Manchester United	(Note: Also honoured with Vice-Presidency of the Museum.) (Note: Also managed East Stirlingshire, St Mirren, Aberdeen and Scotland.)	
2002	(England) Bob Paisley	1974–1983	535	308	131	96	0.576	Liverpool		
2002	(England) Alf Ramsey	1955–1978	510	256	106	148	0.502	Ipswich Town, England, Birmingham City		
2002	(Scotland) Bill Shankly	1949–1974	1,190	586	305	299	0.492	Carlisle United, Grimsby Town, Workington, Huddersfield Town, Liverpool		
2003	(England) Herbert Chapman	1907–1934	617	303	156	158	0.491	Northampton Town, Leeds City, Huddersfield Town, Arsenal		
2003	(England) Stan Cullis	1948–1970	961	440	221	300	0.458	Wolverhampton Wanderers, Birmingham City		
2003	(England) Bill Nicholson	1958–1974	823	401	197	225	0.487	Tottenham Hotspur		
2003	(England) Bobby Robson	1968–2004	1,095	488	276	331	0.446	Fulham, Ipswich Town, England, Newcastle United	(Note: Also managed PSV Eindhoven, Sporting CP, Porto and Barcelona.)	
2004	(England) Dario Gradi	1977–2011	1,557	574	375	608	0.369	Wimbledon, Crystal Palace, Crewe Alexandra		
2004	(England) Don Revie	1961–1977	728	379	198	151	0.521	Leeds United, England		
2005	(England) Howard Kendall	1979–1998	764	345	210	209	0.452	Blackburn Rovers, Everton, Manchester City, Notts County, Sheffield United	(Note: Also managed Athletic Bilbao.)	
2005	(England) Walter Winterbottom	1946–1962	139	78	33	28	0.561	England		
2006	(England) Ron Greenwood	1961–1982	713	269	186	258	0.377	West Ham United, England		
2006	(France) Arsène Wenger	1996–2018	1,235	707	280	248	0.572	Arsenal	(Note: Also managed Nancy, Monaco and Nagoya Grampus Eight.)	
2007	(England) Terry Venables	1976–2003	678	279	195	204	0.412	Crystal Palace, Queens Park Rangers, Tottenham Hotspur, England, Middlesbrough, Leeds United	(Note: Also managed Barcelona and Australia.)	
2008	(England) Bertie Mee	1966–1976	540	241	148	151	0.446	Arsenal		
2009	(England) Malcolm Allison	1964–1993	395	108	121	166	0.273	Plymouth Argyle, Manchester City, Crystal Palace, Yeovil Town, Middlesbrough, Bristol Rovers	(Note: Also managed Toronto City, Galatasaray, Sporting CP, Willington, Kuwait, Vitória de Setúbal, SC Farense and Fisher Athletic.)	
2009	(England) Joe Mercer	1955–1974	827	340	205	282	0.411	Sheffield United, Aston Villa, Manchester City, Coventry City, England		
2010	(England) Harry Catterick	1951–1977	1,146	514	281	351	0.449	Crewe Alexandra, Rochdale, Sheffield Wednesday, Everton, Preston North End		
2024	(England) Jack Greenwell	1913–1942	—N/a	—N/a	—N/a	—N/a	—N/a		(Note: Solely coached abroad, mainly in Spain, as well as in Peru and in Colombia. He managed Barcelona, UE Sants, CD Castellón, Español, Real Sociedad Alfonso XIII, Valencia, Sporting de Gijón, Universitario de Deportes, Peru and Independiente Santa Fe.)	
2025	(England) Emma Hayes	1997–present	TBA	TBA	TBA	TBA	TBA	Chelsea Women	(Note: Still actively coaching, as of 2026. The majority of her coaching career has been spent in the United States, where she is the incumbent head coach of the women's national team.)	
2025	(England) Howard Wilkinson	1975–2003	—N/a	—N/a	—N/a	—N/a	—N/a	Boston United, Mossley, Notts County, Sheffield Wednesday, Leeds United, Sunderland, England (caretaker), England U21, England C		

== Other awards ==
In 2004, Sepp Blatter, then president of FIFA, was inducted to mark the world federation's centenary. He became the first figure outside the English game to be honoured by the Museum.

In 2007, the Football Foundation Community Champion award was created, with its inaugural holder being Niall Quinn. The following winners were Peter Beardsley (2008), Robbie Earle (2009) and Graham Taylor (2010). The award has been inactive since then.

Also in 2007, the Football for All Award was created, with its inaugural holder being Stephen Daley, a Northern Irish-born English footballer whose professional career was ended by loss of vision at 18, and later became the captain of the partially sighted England national team. In 2008, Steve Johnson, a regular member of the England squad for amputee football and the leader of Everton's charity venture, Everton in the Community, won the award. In 2009, Ronnie Watson, a footballer who has learning disabilities, won the award. He had been training with Oldham Athletic, in preparation for the 2008 European Learning Disability Championship, where he would captain the England LD side. In 2010, George Ferguson won the award. Ferguson is a long-time member of Everton's blind football team and secretary of the Visually Impaired Football League. 2013 saw David Clarke, captain of Great Britain blind football team, win the award. From 2014 to 2017, members of the England cerebral palsy team were honoured, with Matt Dimbylow, Gary Davies, Martin Sinclair and Alistair Patrick-Heselton winning.

The presentation of a special award would happen sporadically over the years. In 2007, Sheffield, the world's oldest football club was commemorated for reaching its 150th anniversary. In 2008, Michel Platini, then president of UEFA, became the second figure outside the English game to be honoured by the Museum in a one-off European Hall of Fame ceremony. Two years later, Jimmy Hill was honoured with a special lifetime achievement award. In 2013, the special award was used three times. Firstly, to Civil Service, the only surviving club of those represented at the official formation of the Football Association in 1863. Secondly, to Ebenezer Cobb Morley, the first secretary of the Football Association and often considered to be its founding father, inducted to mark the governing body's 150th anniversary. Thirdly, to William McGregor, the founder of the Football League was inducted to commemorate the organisation's 125th anniversary. In 2014, the Football Battalion, a group of professional footballers and fans who fought in the Battle of the Somme, were honoured. In 2015, Sun Jihai, the first Chinese player in the English game, was made "Anglo-Chinese Football Ambassador". His surprise induction was announced as part of the state visit to the United Kingdom by General Secretary of the Chinese Communist Party Xi Jinping. The decision caused controversy on social media with Labour's shadow minister for sport Clive Efford suggesting that the award had been bought by the office of Prime Minister David Cameron. A spokesman for the museum explained that Sun had been recognised for his "ambassadorial role in enhancing the profile and popularity of English football to a Chinese audience". In 2016, two clubs were honoured: Cambridge University, for their unofficial claim to be the world's oldest club; some documents in their archive suggest a foundation year of 1856, the year before Sheffield began, and Notts County for their status as the world's oldest club currently playing at a professional level; founded in 1862.

Team awards were introduced in 2008, as part of a one-off European Hall of Fame ceremony. Manchester United and Liverpool's European Cup winning sides of 1968 and 1978 were the first teams inducted. In 2009, Manchester United's Busby Babes squad of the 1950s and Manchester City's cup-winning squad of the late 1960s and early 1970s were inducted. In 2010, the World Cup winning England squad was inducted. In 2011, Aston Villa's European Cup winning side of 1982 was inducted in a special ceremony. In 2014, Preston North End's "Invincibles" team was inducted. In 2016, Nottingham Forest's European Cup winning squad of 1979 and 1980 was inducted.

In 2013, a referee section was created, with Jack Taylor the inaugural holder. Taylor remained the only inductee until 2024, when Rebecca Welch, who became the first woman to referee a Premier League fixture, was inducted in 2024. In 2017, a journalism section was created with Hugh McIlvanney the inaugural holder.
