= Buc-ee's =

American convenience store chain

Buc-ee's Holdings, Inc.

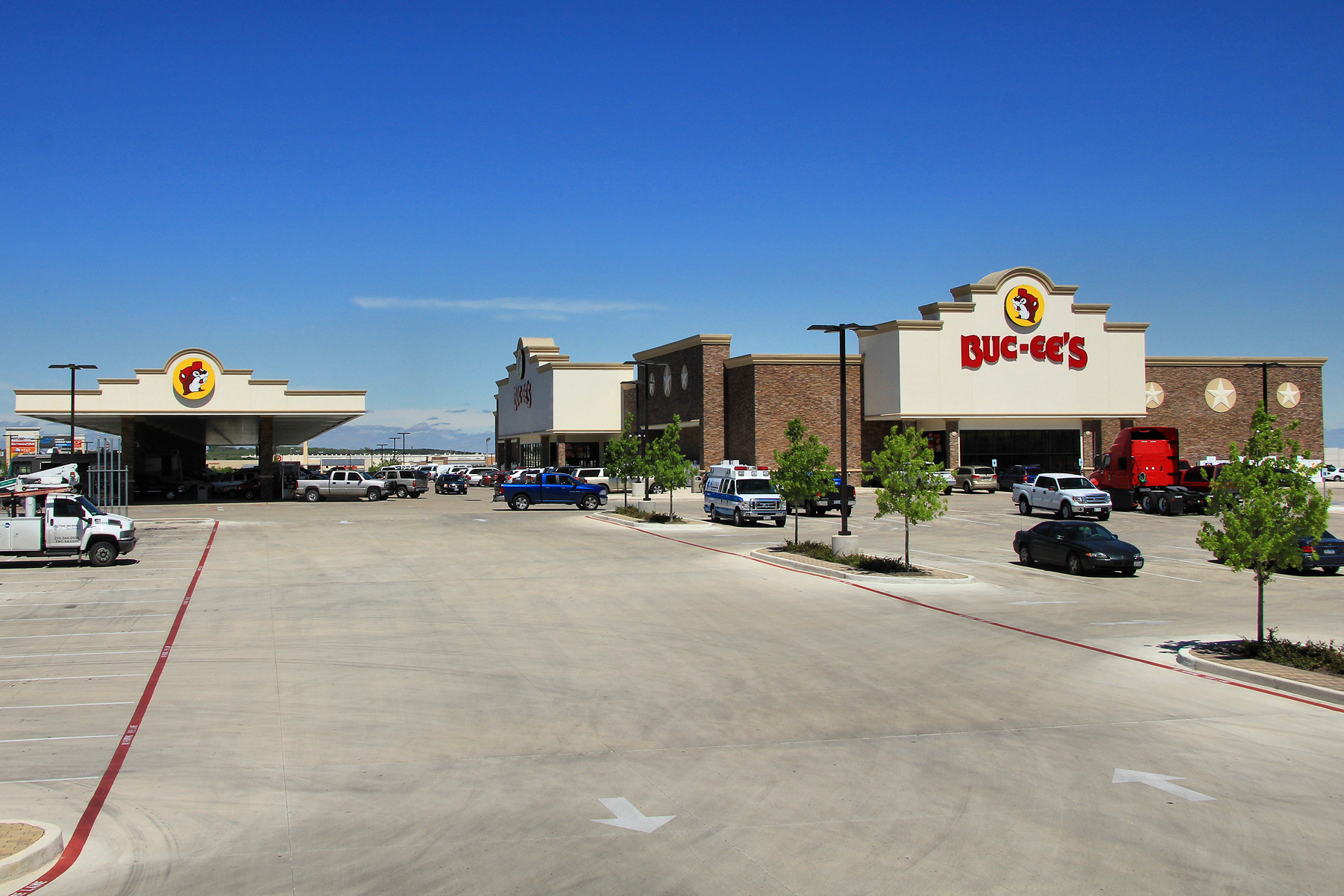
- A Buc-ee's store in New Braunfels, Texas
- Type: Private
- Industry: Convenience store; Filling station; Electric vehicle charging; Fast food
- Founded: 1982; 44 years ago
- Founders: Don Wasek; Arch "Beaver" Aplin III
- Headquarters: Lake Jackson, Texas, U.S.
- Number of locations: 56
- Area served: United States
- Products: Fuel, convenience food, etc.
- Website: buc-ees.com

Buc-ee's Holdings, Inc., is an American chain of travel centers. It was founded and is owned by Arch "Beaver" Aplin III, and is headquartered in Lake Jackson, Texas, a city south of Houston. The chain was founded in 1982 in Clute, next to Lake Jackson, and established its first travel center in Luling, south of Austin, Texas, in 2003. The company began expanding outside Texas in 2018 with a location in Baldwin County, Alabama, and has since opened stores in 10 states, with plans to open new locations in 10 more. The company has developed a cult following.

Buc-ee's has stated that its parking lots and driveways are not designed to accommodate 18-wheelers, and it has never permitted the trucks at its locations. This policy has angered some truck drivers.

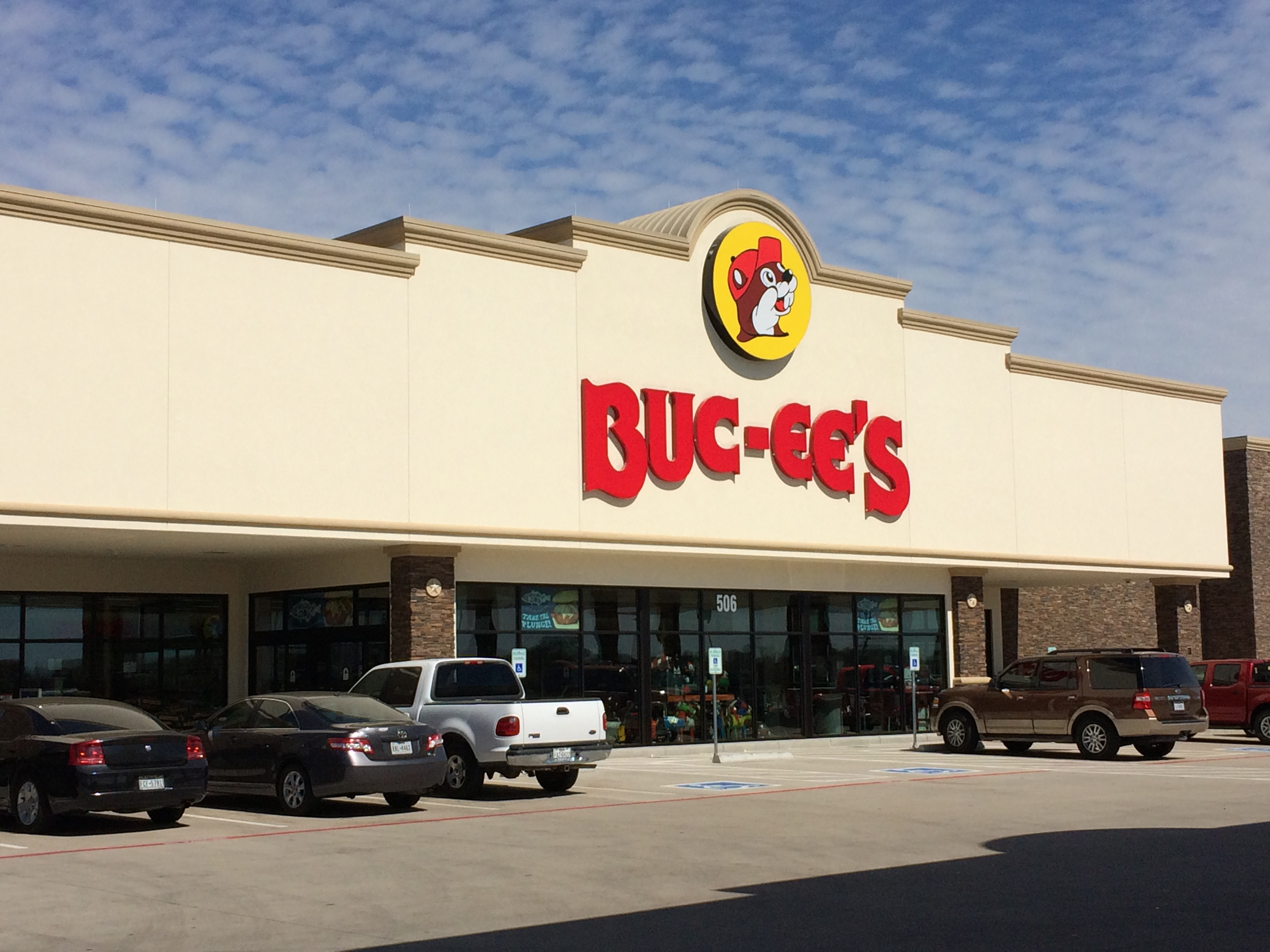
Buc-ee's in Texas

== History ==
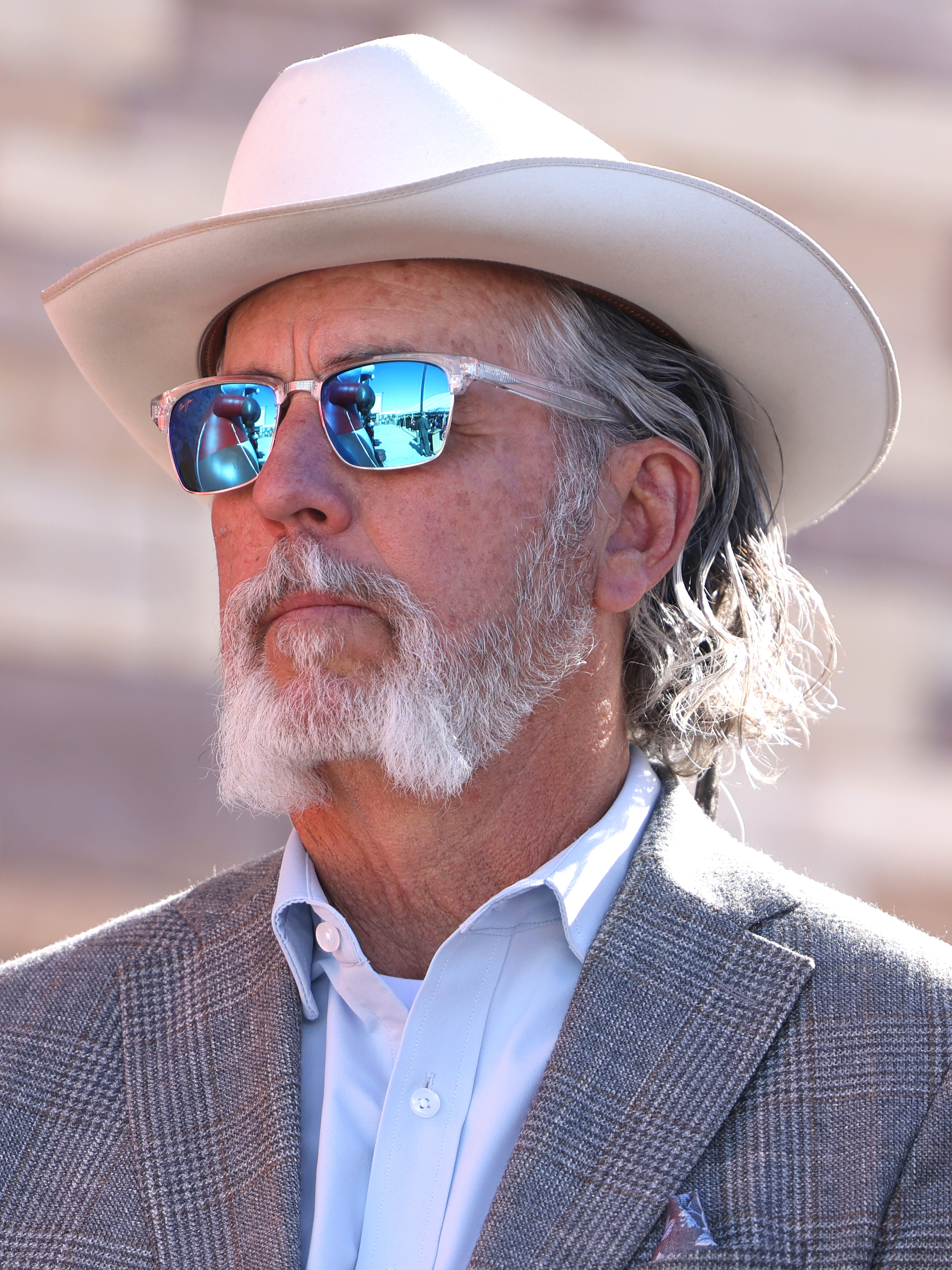
Arch "Beaver" Aplin in 2026

In 1982, founder Arch "Beaver" Aplin was a partner in the opening of a store in Clute, Texas, the first to bear the name "Buc-ee's". He formed the name Buc-ee's by combining his childhood nickname and the name of his Labrador Retriever, Buck; as well as the appeal of Ipana toothpaste's animated mascot, Bucky the beaver. Aplin was born in Southeast Texas. His father was born in Harrisonburg, northeast of Alexandria, Louisiana, where Arch's grandparents still lived as of 2019. Buc-ee's eventually expanded and opened its first travel center in Luling in 2003.

In 2012, Buc-ee's opened its largest travel center in New Braunfels, Texas, on Interstate 35. The New Braunfels location was the largest convenience store in the world at 68,000 square feet (6,300 m^{2}), but on June 26, 2023, the Sevierville, Tennessee, Buc-ee's opened, becoming the world's largest convenience store at 74,707 square feet (6,940.5 m^{2}). The Sevierville store was narrowly surpassed in size by a new store in Luling, Texas, at 75,000 square feet (7,000 m^{2}) on June 10, 2024, replacing the original Luling travel center, which was 35,000 square feet (3,300 m^{2}). The New Braunfels location had the 2012 "Best Restroom in America" as named by Cintas.

After significant expansion in the Greater Houston area and central Texas, the first Buc-ee's in the Dallas–Fort Worth metroplex opened in Terrell, Texas, on June 22, 2015. The travel center is three miles (4.8 km) west of the Shops at Terrell, a former Tanger Outlets center, on Interstate 20.

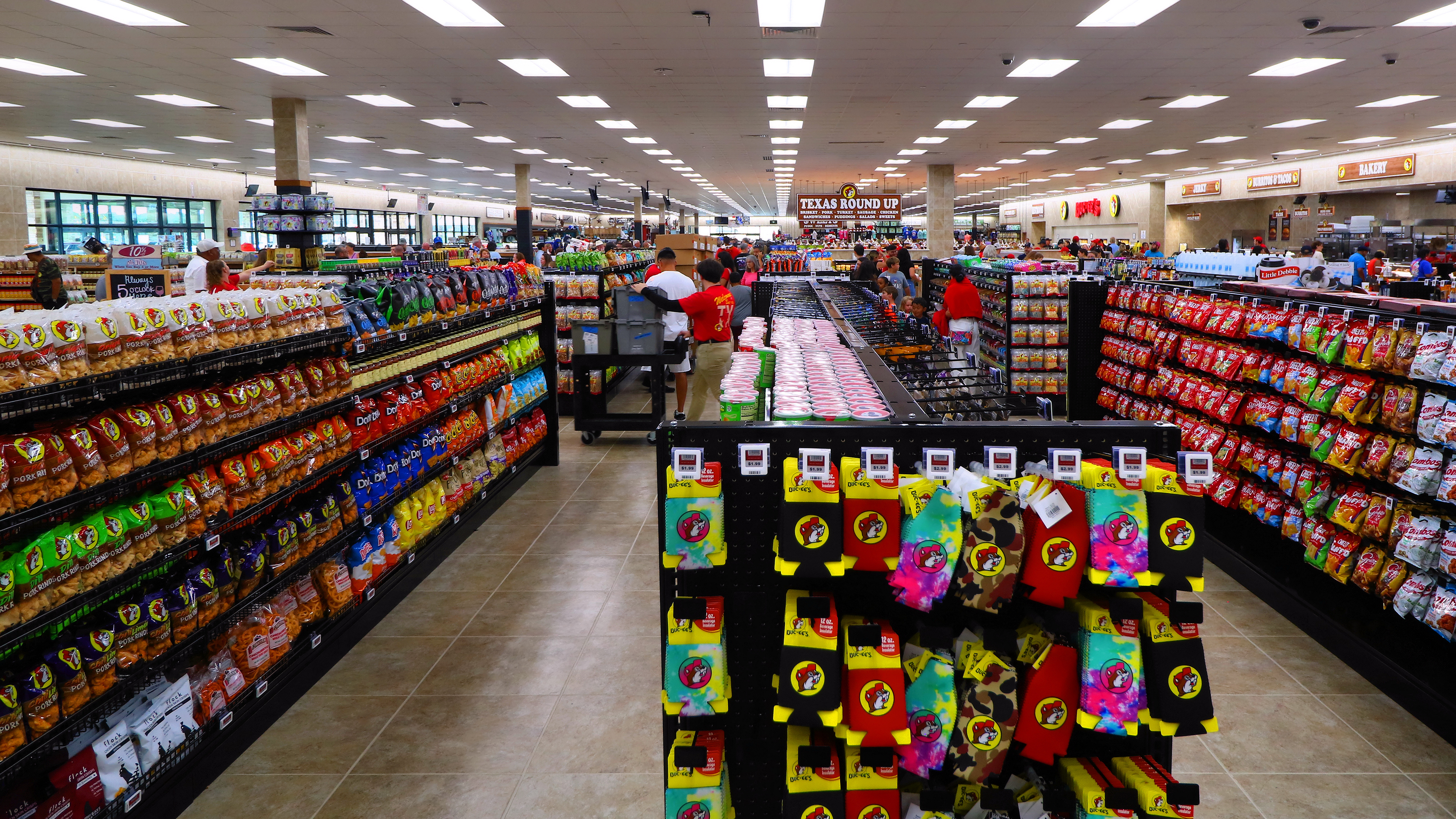
Inside Buc-ee's in Luling

In September 2015, it was announced that at least part of Buc-ee's corporate operations would move into office space in Pearland Town Center. The "partial headquarters" would house the company's legal and human resources departments. The space was ready by early 2016. The second Buc-ee's in the Dallas–Fort Worth metroplex, the 32nd location in Texas, opened on May 23, 2016. The store is in northern Fort Worth, across from Texas Motor Speedway. The third DFW location opened in Denton, Texas, on October 29, 2018.

Buc-ee's established another store in Melissa, Texas, on February 5, 2018. The store is located off New Davis Road and U.S. Highway 75, and it opened on April 29, 2019.

=== Expansion outside Texas ===
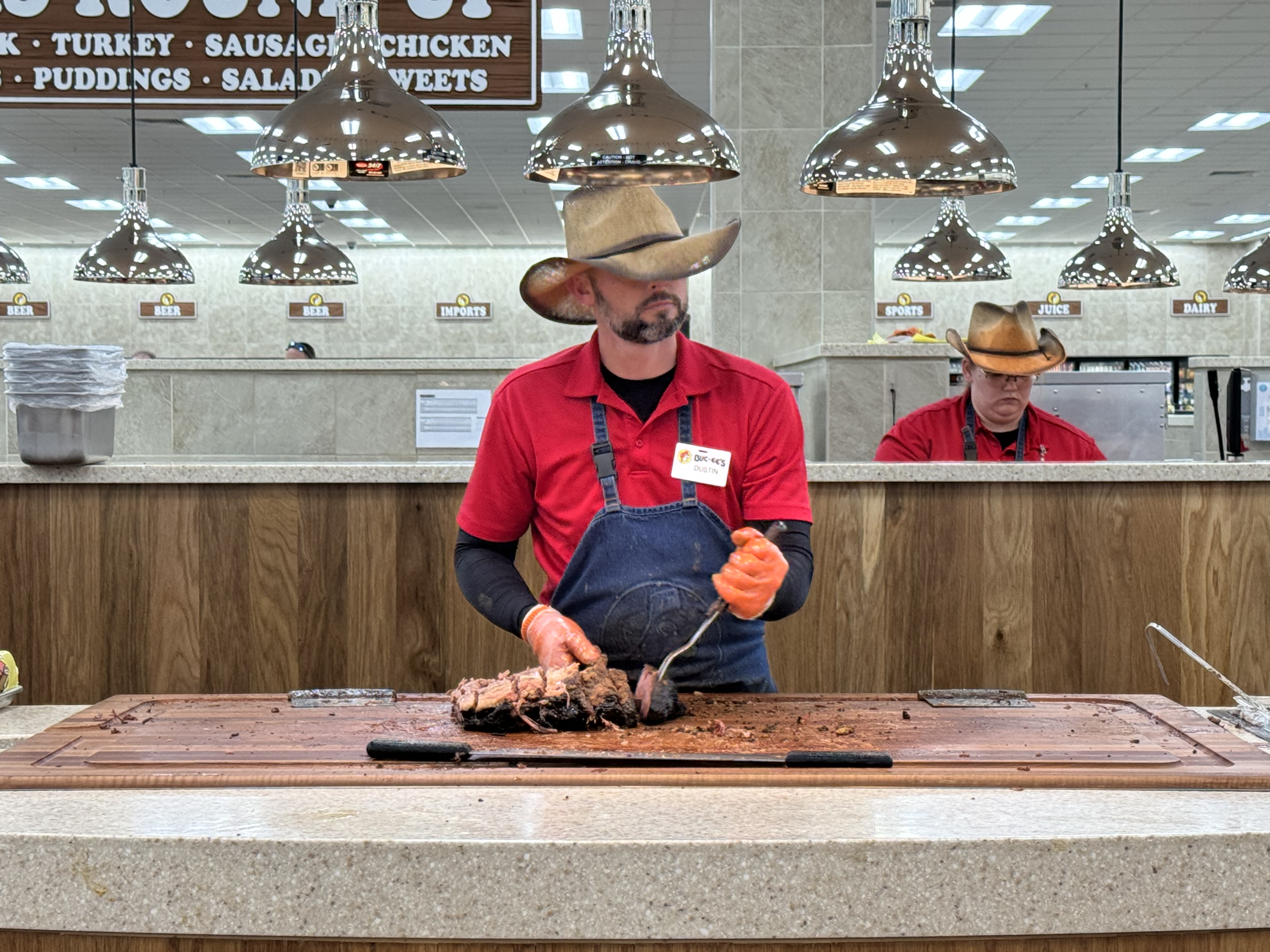
Barbecue worker in Sevierville, Tennessee

The company began expanding outside of Texas in 2018 with the opening of a location off Interstate 10 in Baldwin County, Alabama, and has since opened stores in Georgia, Florida, Kentucky, South Carolina, Tennessee, Colorado, Missouri, Mississippi, Ohio, Virginia, and Arizona, with new locations planned for North Carolina, Louisiana, Idaho, and Oklahoma.

A location in St. Augustine, Florida opened on February 23, 2021, and a location in Daytona Beach, Florida opened on March 22, 2021. The first Buc-ee's in Arkansas opened on August 17, 2026, in Benton, Arkansas. At the store opening, Aplin stated that he was directing the company to focus expansion in "conservative, business-friendly states". The first Buc-ee's in Wisconsin is planned to open in Oak Creek, Wisconsin in early 2028.

== Billboard advertising ==
The company is known for renting advertising billboards on major highways, at distances hundreds of miles away from a single Buc-ee's location. Some signs advertise Buc-ee's locations over 1,000 miles (1,600 km) away. One infamous example was a billboard in New Jersey advertising a location 581 miles (935 km) away in Florence, South Carolina. This led to rumors of a possible Buc-ee's location in the state. However, the rumors were immediately shut down due to New Jersey's laws against pumping your own gas making it impossible to hire enough attendants.

== Locations ==
Buc-ee's in Johnstown, Colorado

As of July 2026, Buc-ee's has 56 active locations across Alabama, Arizona, Arkansas, Colorado, Florida, Georgia, Kentucky, Mississippi, Missouri, Ohio, South Carolina, Tennessee, Texas, and Virginia. In January 2024, the company announced the planned opening of its first store in North Carolina.

State	Locations
Texas	36
Alabama	4
Georgia	3
Florida	2
Kentucky	2
Tennessee	2
Colorado	1
Mississippi	1
Missouri	1
Ohio	1
South Carolina	1
Virginia	1
Arizona	1
Arkansas	1

=== Online resale ===
Buc-ee's does not operate its own online store. However, several third-party resellers offer Buc-ee's products through various platforms, including Amazon, Walmart Marketplace, eBay, Etsy, and dedicated websites such as Texas Snax, True Texas Merch, and Johnny's Goods. These resellers operate under the first-sale doctrine, which permits the resale of legitimately purchased products. Buc-ee's states on its Web site that such resellers "are not affiliated with, authorized, sponsored, or endorsed by Buc-ee's in any way." Texas Snax, founded by Chris J. Koerner in 2020, emerged as one of the largest dedicated Buc-ee's resellers after Koerner initially contacted the company about a partnership and received no response. When Buc-ee's legal team learned of his venture, they permitted it on the condition that he change the original Web site name and add a disclaimer clarifying that Texas Snax is not affiliated with Buc-ee's. Online prices for Buc-ee's products are typically marked up significantly compared to in-store prices.

== Products and services ==
=== Food ===
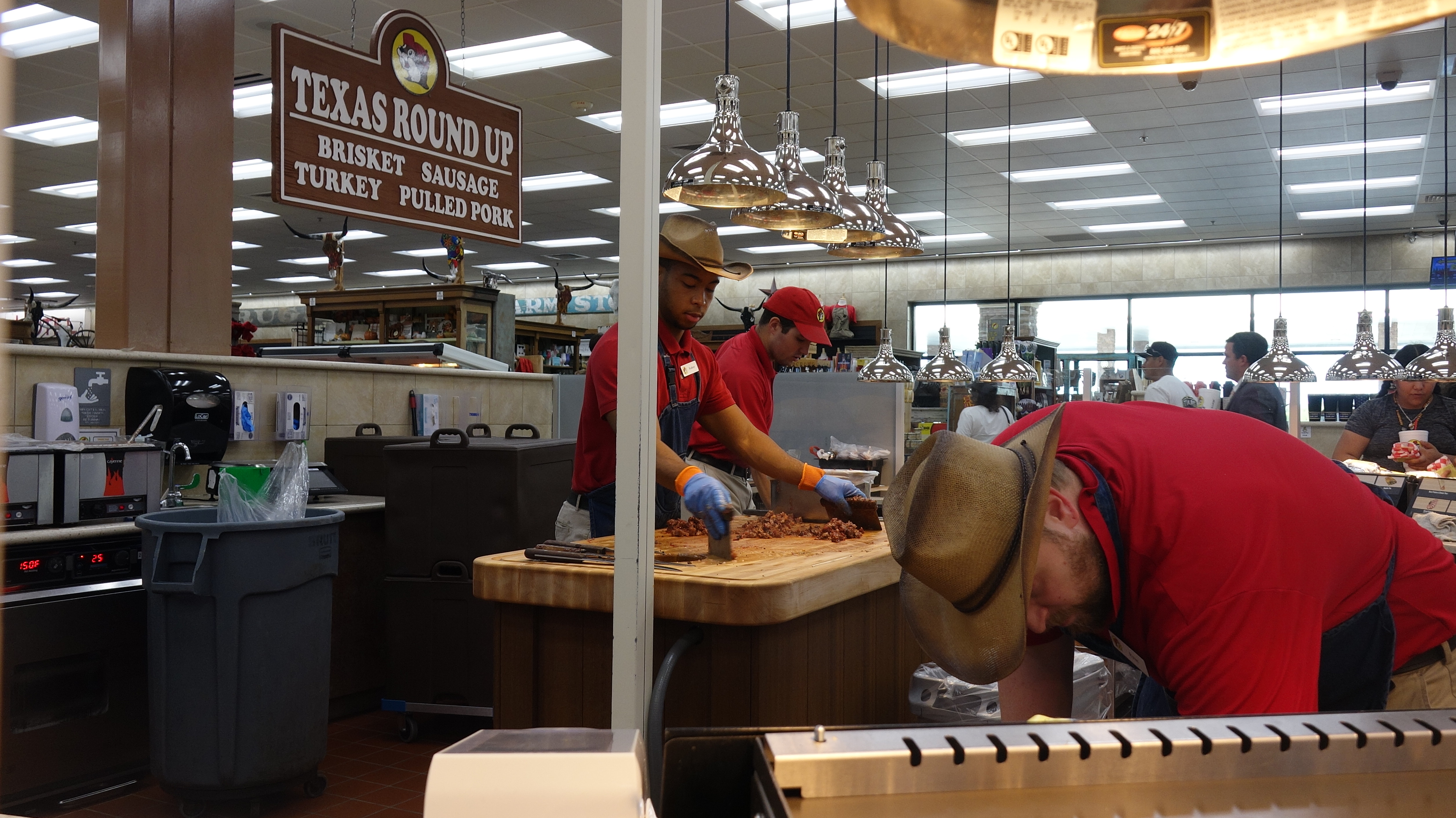
Buc-ee's employees in a Texas store carving barbecue

All travel center locations include a bakery, a brisket station, a fudge bar, snack aisle, soda, coffee, and an Icee station. Stores have various candy and beef jerky flavors to purchase. Product offerings include cookies, kolaches (Czech pastries), and other pastries in the bakery, BBQ brisket sandwiches, chicken sandwiches, and breakfast tacos/bowls/burritos/sandwiches at the brisket bar along with cold-cut wraps and sandwiches. Packaged cups of fruit, vegetables, and desserts can be purchased as well. Locations also house packaged general snack foods like nuts and fudge, ice cream and Dippin' Dots, water, soda, energy drinks, and alcoholic drinks. The company has produced many of its own original snack foods including Beaver chips, potato chips made on site. The most distinctive snack are "Beaver Nuggets" (flavored corn puff snacks), the company's best-selling product.

=== Souvenirs and general merchandise ===
Souvenir Buc-ee's plushies in a vintage Chevrolet truck

Besides food and drinks, the company offers a variety of general and regional-based souvenirs, including apparel and artwork featuring their logo and mascot. The chain carries its own clothing brand, ranging from t-shirts to hats, beanies, pants, plushies, swimwear, and blankets. Stores also carry general kitchen goods: cast iron skillets, food containers, mugs, glassware, cookbooks, coolers, and vacuum flasks, among other items. General travel products are sold along with phone accessories. Various locations sell hunting gear and equipment alongside outdoor products like grills and fire pits.

=== Mascot ===
Buc-ee mascot cosplay next to the statue in Sevierville, Tennessee, March 2026

Buc-ee's has a beaver mascot named Buc-ee that it uses for various promotional and merchandising purposes. He is an anthropomorphic beaver wearing a baseball cap and t-shirt. The character's design in Buc-ee's's logo was made using a drawing guide from Preston Blair's book Advanced Animation. Statues of Buc-ee can be found in many locations of the gas station, and one is even displayed at a museum in Austin, Texas. Buc-ee also has a mascot costume, which is used for promotional materials and to advertise store openings. Buc-ee's is very litigious when it comes to their mascot, as they have filed several lawsuits against companies they deem to be infringing on his design.

=== Fuel ===
All Buc-ee's travel centers have from 80 to 120 fuel pumps, with gasoline offerings ranging from unleaded (87, 89, 91, and 93 octane, most commonly) to diesel. Some stores include ethanol-free fuel and Diesel exhaust fluid (DEF) as well.

==== Tesla Superchargers ====
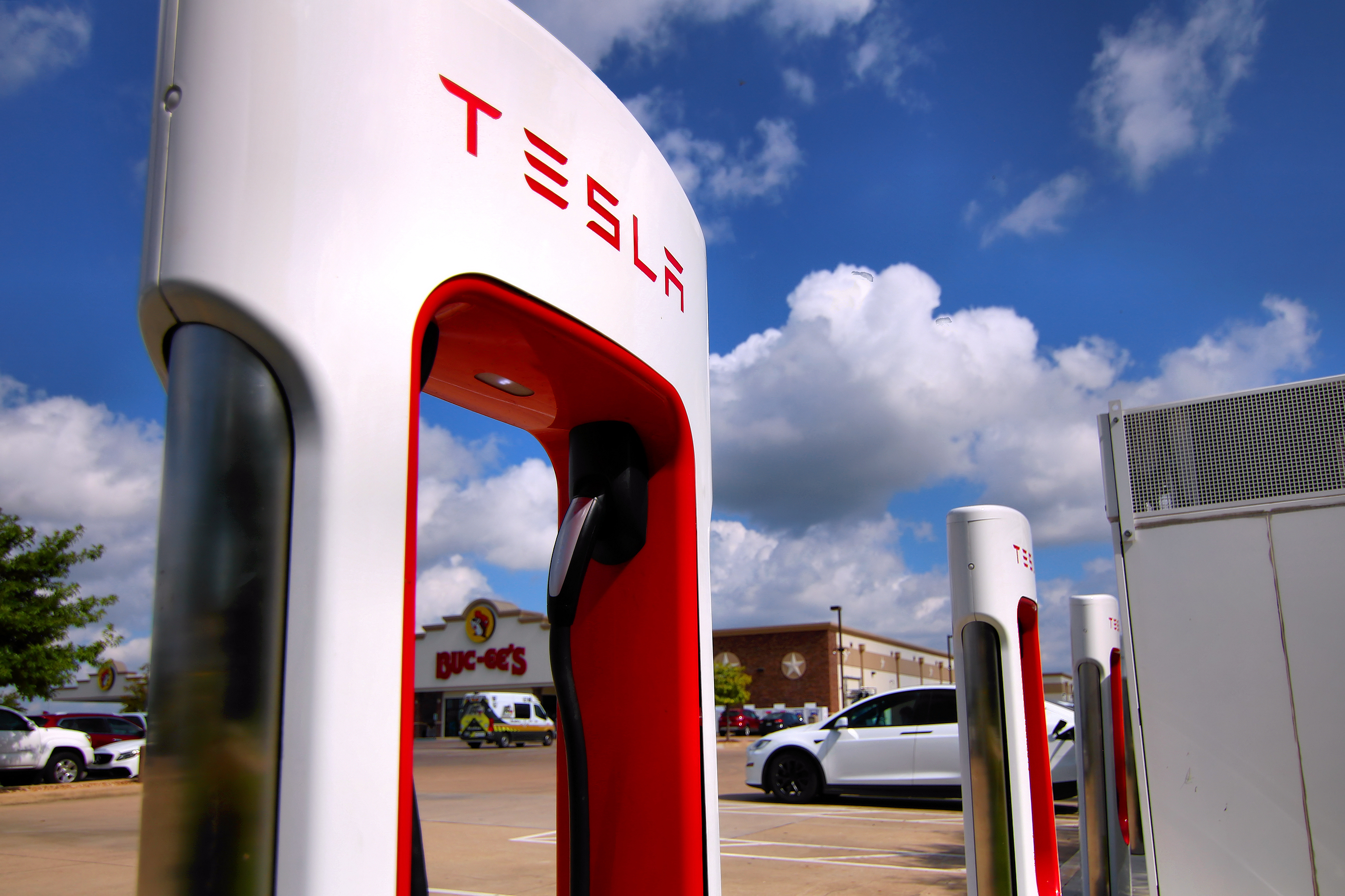
Superchargers at Buc-ee's in Bastrop, Texas, August 2024

In November 2021, CleanTechnica reported that Tesla would be opening Superchargers at 26 Buc-ee's locations in seven states. As of February 2023, there were operational Superchargers at more than half of the planned locations including in Alabama (Leeds and Robertsdale); Florida (St. Augustine); South Carolina (Florence); Tennessee (Crossville); and Texas (Bastrop, Baytown, Ennis, Giddings, Katy, Madisonville, Melissa, New Braunfels, and Wharton). Since then, more Superchargers have been added into more locations, such as in Colorado (Berthoud); Florida (Daytona Beach); Georgia (Adalrsville and Fort Valley); Kentucky (Richmond); Tennessee (Kodak); and Texas (Denton, Fort Worth, Luling, Pearland, Royse City, Temple, Terrell, and Waller).

=== Car washes ===
As of July 2026, Buc-ee's has car washes available at twelve of their locations with eight in the state of Texas, one in Alabama, one in Georgia, one in Florida, and one in Tennessee. The longest of these in Katy, Texas, holds the record for the longest car wash in the world at 255 feet (78 meters) of conveyor.

== Litigation ==
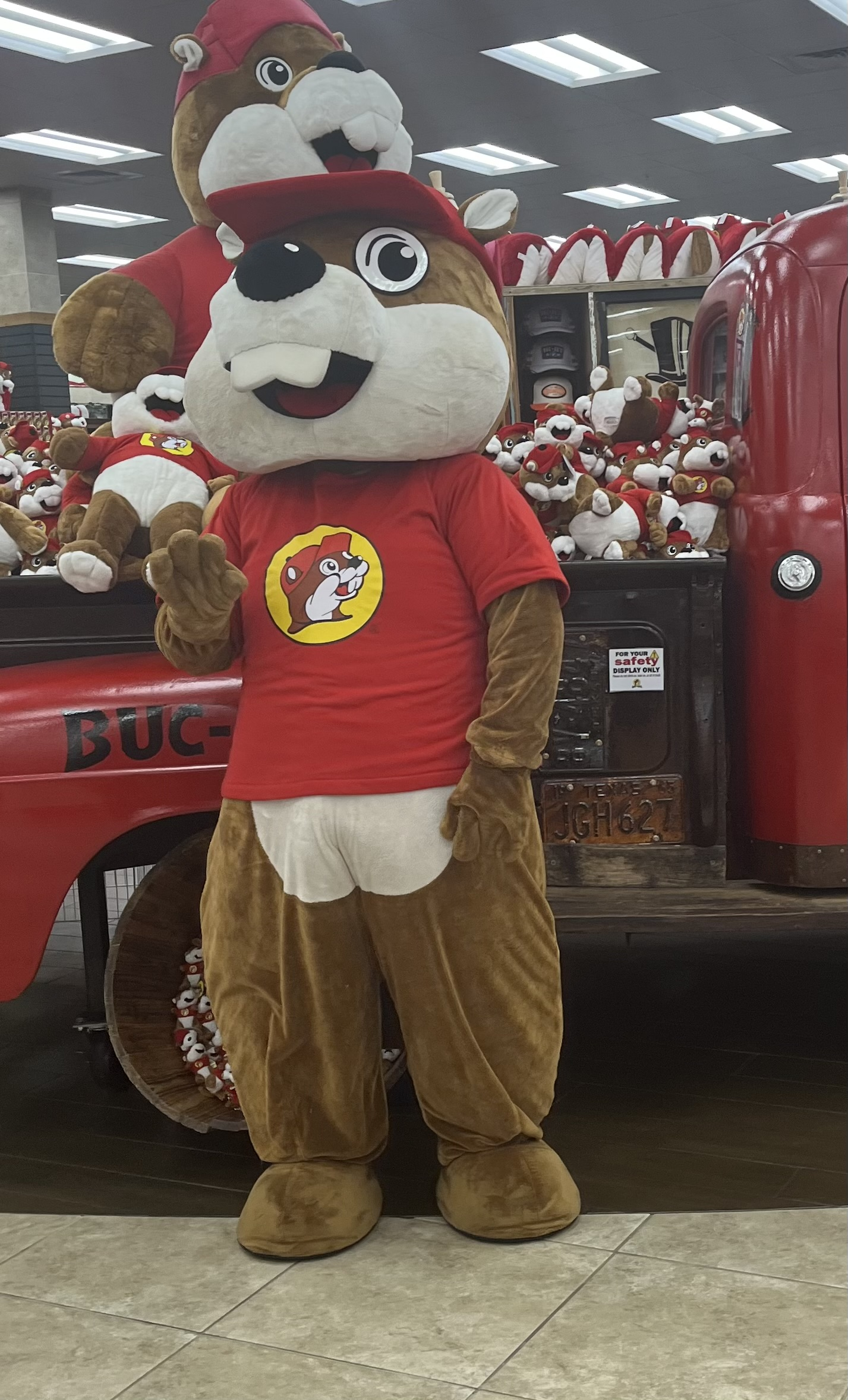
"Buc-ee the Beaver" mascot in Warner Robins, Georgia, April 2024

In 2014, Buc-ee's filed a lawsuit against Texas-based convenience store chain "Frio Beaver". Frio Beaver, a company with a logo also depicting a beaver in a yellow circle with a black outline, was accused of copying the Buc-ee's beaver head logo, which the company is widely known for in Texas. The case was settled out of court in December 2014; B&B Grocery Inc. agreed to stop using the "Frio Beaver" logo and mascot. In 2016, Buc-ee's sued "Choke Canyon BBQ", another Texas convenience store, for copyright infringement and trade dressing. Choke Canyon used a logo of a grinning alligator in the middle of a yellow circle, which Buc-ee's claimed was an attempt by the chain to resemble the Buc-ee's logo. Choke Canyon was also calling its new stores "Bucky's". Choke Canyon lost the federal lawsuit in May 2018, with Choke Canyon changing its logo to a cowboy inside of an orange circle.

In 2017, Buc-ee's again filed a lawsuit for breaking an agreement, this time against a Nebraska-based convenience store chain known as "Bucky's". The two companies had agreed to remain in their respective states and expand only to states where the other did not operate. The lawsuit was thrown out. A non-logo related lawsuit was filed in 2013 against "Chicks", a convenience store in Bryan, Texas, for trade dress violations by allegedly copying Buc-ee's mega convenience store designs and layout. The case was settled out of court.

In 2019, shortly after Buc-ee's opened their first store in Alabama, the company was sued for "setting unfair pump prices", because they were selling gasoline to the customers for less money than it costs to buy and transport it to a retail outlet. While it is common within the United States for larger gas station chains to use a pricing strategy where gas is used as a loss leader to draw customers and encourage the sale of other goods, the practice is banned under Alabama state law.

Buc-ee's also lost a Texas Employee Retention Agreement case on appeal in 2017. A year after a trial court ordered a former employee to pay Buc-ee's close to $100,000 in damages and attorney's fees for breaching a "retention agreement," a Texas court of appeals reversed the decision and ordered that Buc-ee's receive nothing for its claims against the former employee. The court reasoned that the contract violated Texas's employment-at-will doctrine and did not meet the Texas non-compete agreement requirements, so it was not enforceable.

In 2023, crossover artwork of the Buc-ee's beaver and Hatsune Miku was trending on Twitter. An Austin-based artist claimed responsibility for creating "Bucsune Miku". In response, Buc-ee's sent the artist a cease and desist letter regarding the stickers and the use of the beaver logo. The artist withdrew the stickers.

In May 2026, Buc-ee's sued a small North Georgia-based convenience store chain called Teddy's Market for trademark infringement, alleging that its use of a cartoon bear mascot and a name that uses "two-syllable, six-letter possessives ending in an 'eez' sound" would cause customer confusion. Teddy's filed a counterclaim in August, arguing that the stark differences between two companies, such as the sizes of their stores, the marketing used between them, and Teddy's use of BP-branded fuel pumps instead of in-brand pumps, does not constitute infringement, and that Buc-ee's trademark registrations were improperly obtained.

During the episode of Last Week Tonight aired on July 26, 2026, John Oliver launched a merch store entitled "Buc-Off." On this site, he launched various made-to-order products featuring a logo parodying the Buc-ee's logo, with the name "Buc-Off" and the beaver replaced with a squirrel character named Mr. Nutterbutter last seen in a segment about frivolous lawsuits. Oliver launched this site in the hopes that Buc-ee's would sue, and fight back in the hopes of avoiding further lawsuits brought on by Buc-ee's towards smaller companies. All proceeds from the merch sales are being donated to Hunger Free America.

In July 2026, Buc-ee's sued a small convenience store chain based in Beavercreek, Ohio called Beaver's Mini Mart, alleging that its beaver logo too closely resembled Buc-ee's own "Bucky" beaver mascot. Buc-ee's claims that after learning about the name when the business filed trade name registration on October 23, 2025, they were unable to contact its owner about the conflict which forced Buc-ee's to sue. The lawsuit triggered backlash across the state over its perceived lack of merit, with various surrounding small businesses expressing solidarity with the store, Beavercreek City Council passing a resolution designating the beaver as an official part of its history, and governor of Ohio Mike DeWine describing the lawsuit as "absurd". Buc-ee's would later amend their lawsuit in an October 20, 2026 filing, arguing that the store chose a name that could confuse customers into thinking it is affiliated with Buc-ee's, with the legal basis for said argument being that Buc-ee's trademarked the word "Beaver's" for any business serving convenience store items and gasoline, despite the fact that Beaver's Mini Mart does not have a gas station. Buc-ee's also claimed that they had served the store three cease-and-desist letters prior to the lawsuit.

== See also ==
- Highway oasis
- Iowa 80
- Pilot Flying J
- Stuckey's
- Wally's
