= Walley =

Walley is a surname and given name. It may refer to:

== Surname ==
- Augustus Walley (1856–1938), a Buffalo Soldier in the United States Army and recipient of the Medal of Honor
- Byron Walley, a pen name of writer Orson Scott Card (born 1951)
- Chris Walley (writer) (born 1954), Welsh geologist
- Chris Walley (actor) (born 1995), Irish actor
- Columbus W. Walley (1876–1936), American politician from Mississippi
- Deborah Walley (1943–2001), American actress
- Denny Walley (born 1943), American guitarist
- Ernie Walley (1933–2025), Welsh football player, manager and coach
- Hugh Walley (fl. 1905–1907), English footballer
- Jaden Walley (born 2001), American football player
- James Walley (born 1973/74), American politician from Mississippi
- Joan Walley, (born 1949), British politician
- John Walley (died 1615), English Member of Parliament
- Justin Walley (American football) (born 2002), American football player
- Keith Walley (born 1954), English footballer
- Nigel Walley (born 1941), English rock bass guitarist with The Quarrymen
- Page Walley (born 1957), American politician from Tennessee
- Richard Walley (born 1953), Australian Aborigine performer, musician, writer and activist
- Samuel H. Walley (1805–1877), American politician from Massachusetts
- Tom Walley (born 1945), Welsh footballer

== Given name ==
- Walley Barnes (1920–1975), Welsh footballer and broadcaster
- Walley Chamberlain Oulton (c. 1770–c. 1820?), Irish playwright, theatre historian and man of letters

== See also ==
- Moira Walley-Beckett, Canadian actress
- Wally (disambiguation)
- Whalley (disambiguation)
