= Wally's =

American convenience store chain

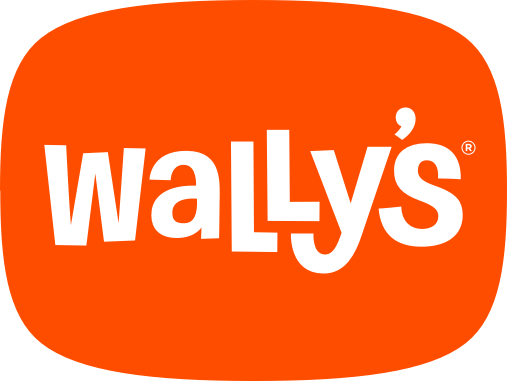
- Type: Private
- Industry: Convenience store; Gas station; Electric vehicle charging; Fast food
- Founded: 2020; 6 years ago Pontiac, Illinois
- Headquarters: Fenton, Missouri
- Number of locations: 3
- Area served: Illinois, Missouri and Indiana
- Products: Candy, snacks, beverages, hot meals, merchandise, and fuel
- Website: wallys.com

Wally's is an American chain of convenience stores and gas stations. Established in 2020, the chain currently has three locations in the Midwestern United States.

== History ==
The idea of the Wally's business had originated in 2017 when cousins Michael Rubenstein and Chad Wallis of rural Missouri were experiencing an unexciting drive home from Colorado and came up with the proposal for their own convenience store and gas station that would serve as a tourist attraction for travelers. Rubenstein had worked in the real estate and supply logistics industries while Wallis had experience in operating convenience stores and gas stations and, with their combined experience, would subsequently create plans for their business.

The first Wally's location was opened along Interstate 55 in Pontiac, Illinois, in September 2020 after its initial plans to open on Independence Day were delayed due to the ongoing COVID-19 pandemic. The travel center covers a total area around 30,000 sq ft (2,800 m^{2}), with a 76 fuel pumps as well as 4 electric vehicle charging stations with the capacity for 12 more. Wally's second location opened on March 4, 2022, in Fenton, Missouri along Interstate 44 with 72 fuel pumps and a total footprint of about 36,000 sq ft (3,300 m^{2}). Wally's opened its third location on June 30, 2026 in Whitestown, Indiana, along Interstate 65. This is the company's largest store coming in at about 53000 Square feet and 84 gas pumps.

A fourth Wally's is planned in Independence, Missouri.

== Products and services ==
The fuel provided at Wally's is unbranded and supplied by Wallis' family business, Wallis Companies, which operates Mobil/On the Run stores in the St. Louis area. Electric vehicle chargers (including Tesla Superchargers) are also provided underneath a separate canopy. Inside the convenience store are three main kiosks dubbed "experience stations" called Wally's Popcorn, Wally's BBQ Sandwich House, and Wally's Cafe, each respectively selling popcorn, barbeque sandwiches, and coffee. The store also sells beer, ice cream, pizza, a selection of beef jerky, and baked goods and features machines dispensing slushies (branded as Sloosh) as well as jerky bar. Among the other merchandise are travel gear, camping supplies, apparel, and various other souvenirs.

Wally's has been compared to Buc-ee's for similar novelties and amenities including their atypically large stores and gas stations, animal mascots, and merchandise. Semi trucks are also prohibited from Wally's, similar to Buc-ee's.

Wally's—located along the historic U.S. Route 66 corridor—is road trip-themed with mid-20th century design elements through its mascots, color scheme, and signage. For instance, its Illinois location is listed as being on "Holiday Road", a reference to the theme song of National Lampoon's Vacation.

== Locations ==
As of 2026, Wally's currently has three locations, with another one planned to open in 2027.

State	Locations
Illinois	1
Missouri	1 (1 planned)
Indiana	1

== See also ==
- Buc-ee's
- Dixie Travel Plaza
- Highway oasis
- Iowa 80
