= Joan Whalley (footballer) =

English footballer

Personal information
- Full name: Joan Whalley
- Date of birth: 1921
- Place of birth: Preston, England
- Date of death: 10 January 1998 (aged 76–77)
- Position: Winger

Senior career*
Years	Team	Apps	(Gls)
1937–?	Dick, Kerr's Ladies		
- * Club domestic league appearances and goals

Joan Whalley (18 December 1921 – 10 January 1998) was a female footballer who played for Dick, Kerr's Ladies F.C., making her debut for them aged just 15 in May 1937.

Whalley was born in Preston and was encouraged by her father to play football and join the local team. She was compared with male footballer Tom Finney and described as one of the "two greatest right wingers in the world", with him as the other.

Whalley played in rare international matches, once for England against Scotland and one for Wales against France.

Whalley also worked full-time as a nurse and then as a bus conductor. A disagreement with the Dick, Kerr Ladies manager Alfred Frankland after oversleeping from a late shift on the buses led to Whalley leaving for Manchester Ladies in 1953, only returning when he died in 1958. She then retired a few years later.

In 1992, Whalley reunited with former team-mates to celebrate the 75th anniversary of Dick, Kerr Ladies. In 1996, she became the first female footballer to feature in a Nike national advertising campaign, alongside Michael Jordan, Ian Wright and Eric Cantona.

In 2007, Whalley was inducted into the English Football Hall of Fame.
