= Sid Rawle =

British activist (1945–2010)

- Rawle in 1967
- Born: Sidney William Rawle; 1 October 1945; Bridgwater, Somerset, England
- Died: 31 August 2010 (aged 64); Rodley, Westbury-on-Severn, Gloucestershire, England
- Occupations: Campaigner, organiser

Sidney William Rawle (1 October 1945 – 31 August 2010) was a British campaigner for peace and land rights, free festival organiser, and a former leader of the London squatters movement. Rawle was known to British tabloid journalists as 'The King of the Hippies', not a title he ever claimed for himself, but one that he did eventually co-opt for his unpublished autobiography.

== Early life ==
Rawle was born in Bridgwater, Somerset, on 1 October 1945. His parents separated when he was a child. He was raised by his father and educated at Exton Village School and Minehead Comprehensive School. Dyslexia hampered his education, leading to him dropping out of school. He then lived for a time with his mother in Slough, where he worked as a park attendant, became active in his trade union and radical politics, and organised a strike of Asian workers in a local factory and a love-in in the municipal gardens.

== London years ==
After spending some time in St Ives, Cornwall, in the mid-1960s, he moved to London and became involved in the alternative scene. Initially involved with a group called Tribe of the Sun, he formed the Hyde Park Diggers who campaigned on the issues of land use and land ownership, concerns that were central to the rest of his life's actions. He formed the Digger Action Movement, with Barry Norcott and John Gillatt, which brought him into contact with John Lennon.

During the early 1960s Rawle became increasingly involved in the London squatting scene (living for a while in a recently vacated vicarage in Gospel Oak). In 1969, he was one of the squatters in the London Street Commune, occupying a 100-room mansion at 144 Piccadilly, who were evicted by police. He was also involved in the free festival movement as an organiser of the Windsor Free Festivals and the 1974 Stonehenge Free Festival. After reprinting, as publisher of International Times, an article similar to the leaflet that had led to the imprisonment of Windsor Free Festival organiser Bill 'Ubi' Dwyer, Rawle was himself jailed for three months in 1975 to prevent him publicising that year's festival.

== Dorinish commune ==
In 1970, John Lennon invited Rawle to establish a commune on Dorinish, a small island in Clew Bay, Ireland, which Lennon had owned since 1967. After surviving Atlantic storms, the commune eventually disbanded in 1972 after a fire destroyed their main stores tent. Lennon did contribute money towards Rawle's communes and other projects, and was reputed to have financed the film Winstanley, about Gerrard Winstanley, a charismatic leader of the Diggers movement, and in which Rawle had a role as a Ranter.

== Tipi Valley commune ==
In 1976, he became one of the original residents of Tipi Valley, a tent commune near Llandeilo in Wales. During this period he joined the Ecology (later Green) Party, and used his festival experience to help set up the first Green Gathering at Worthy Farm, Glastonbury. The years of travelling to festivals and events had turned an ad hoc collection of people and vehicles into what became known as the Peace Convoy. He stayed at Tipi Valley until 1982 when he began to live permanently on the road and at convoy-associated communities. In 1983 he set up the Rainbow Village, a peace camp at the disused US air base at RAF Molesworth, Cambridgeshire, a proposed cruise missile site, which was broken up by police in February 1985. In 1985 the Peace Convoy was routed by violent police action at what became known as the Battle of the Beanfield; Sid had not yet moved on from the previous night's camp at Savernake Forest.

== Later life ==
He wrote The Vision of Albion, an unpublished but widely publicised manifesto, in which he stated:

"In the end it all gets back to land. Looking back, I see that a link that runs through my life concerns the right to land and property on it. Shared out equally, there would be a couple of acres for every adult living in Britain. That would mean each family or group could have a reasonably sized small holding of ten or twenty acres and learn once again to become self sufficient. The present day reality is the reverse, with some folk owning hundreds of thousands of acres and others owning none. There’s talk of community in war time. We can be ordered to go and fight and die for Queen and country. In peace time is it too much to ask for just a few square yards of our green and pleasant land to rear our children on? That’s all we want, myself and the squatters and travellers and other people in the many projects I’ve been involved with. Just a few square yards of this land that we can in wartime be asked to go out and die for. And if we ever achieve that, what else? What else is what I call the Vision of Albion."

He eventually settled with his family at Hillersland near Berry Hill in the Forest of Dean, where he remained till his death at the age of 64. Here he ran the highly successful Forest Fayre for several years. After his involvement with Oak Dragon and Rainbow Circle camps, small festivals with a more participatory and spiritual inclination, he set up his own organisation, Rainbow 2000 (Now Rainbow Futures), which held a number of camps each summer, first at a site at Elton (near Westbury-on-Severn), and in recent years on top of a hill overlooking the River Severn near Rodley. He was sitting in a chair by the outside fire, while the last Rainbow 2000 Camp of the season (the SuperSpirit Camp) was being packed down by the crew, when he collapsed and died on 31 August, 2010 from a heart attack. He had at least seven children, by different mothers.
