= Ubi Dwyer =

Irish anarchist activist (1933–2001)

- Dwyer in Windsor Park circa 1973
- Born: William Ubique Dwye; 21 January 1933
- Died: 13 October 2001 (aged 68)
- Occupation: Activist

William Ubique Dwyer (21 January 1933 – 13 October 2001), known as Ubi Dwyer, was an Irish anarchist active in New Zealand, Australia, England and Ireland best known as the originator and principal organiser of the Windsor Free Festival.

== Early activism ==
Bill Dwyer was educated at Newbridge College in County Kildare. In the mid-1950s, he moved to New Zealand from Ireland. Whilst there he was introduced to anarchism by an English expat and became very active in politics. He lived in New Zealand from the mid-1950s to 1966, where he was involved in a series of legendary events. Dwyer organised no-confidence motions in the leadership of the Wellington Watersiders Union and the Victoria University Students Union. He was convicted for calling the Queen a bludger whilst speaking in Auckland in 1966.

Dwyer moved to Sydney in 1966, selling cheap LSD ("acid") to finance anarchist activities. He became an exponent of psychedelic anarchism, believing acid to be a liberating substance. He engaged in soapbox oratory in the Sydney Domain and published a pamphlet that outlined his particular style of heterodox anarchism. He was sent to prison in 1968 for selling LSD, and the Australian government deported him to Ireland in 1969.

Dwyer was said to have been asked by John Lennon to help set up a commune on an island, which may have been related to the Island Commune that Dwyer ran on Merrion Road in Dublin in 1970. Between 1970 and 1972, a commune, organised by a friend, Sid Rawle, was established on Dorinish Island outside Westport, County Mayo, an island then owned by Lennon.

In London Dwyer worked as a civil servant in the Stationery Office at Holborn. He was involved with the Freedom Press news group and its associated Anarchy magazine, particularly the "Acid Issue", and organised an "Acid Symposium" at Conway Hall in 1971.

== Windsor and Free Festivals ==
Inspired by his experiences during the "liberation" of the Isle of Wight Festival 1970, in which the fences between the paid event and free gathering outside were torn down, Dwyer developed the idea of a truly "free" festival. An acid trip in Windsor Great Park led to the notion of squatting on the former common land that had been in Crown ownership since being reserved for royal hunting by William the Conqueror, and he began to organise what was to become the People's Free Festival. Windsor Free Festival was the forerunner of, and inspiration for, the Free Festival Movement, particularly the Stonehenge Free Festival and the later Glastonbury Festivals. Following the violent suppression of the 1974 event, he and Sid Rawle were imprisoned to prevent the organising of a 1975 festival. Dwyer was imprisoned again attempting to organise another Windsor Free Festival in 1978, which did take place at Caesar's Camp nearby.

== Later life ==
Sometime around 1976 Dwyer returned to Ireland, where he worked as an assistant in the physiotherapy department of a Dublin hospital. He continued for some years to organise a People's Free Festival in Phoenix Park, campaigned for the legalisation of cannabis, and petitioned for the H-Block hunger strikers in Long Kesh prison. He stood unsuccessfully as an independent candidate for the Dún Laoghaire constituency in at the 1981 and February 1982 Irish general elections, and in local elections in Dún Laoghaire.

Dwyer was an inveterate bicycle rider. In the early 1990s he received critical head injuries in an accident while cycling in the Dublin Mountains and never fully recovered.

== Bibliography ==
- Beam, Alan (1976) "Rehearsal for the year 2000: (drugs, religions, madness, crime, communes, love, visions, festivals and lunar energy) : the rebirth of Albion Free State (known in the Dark Ages as England) : memoirs of a male midwife (1966–1976)"
- Boraman, Toby (2007) "Rabble rousers and merry pranksters: a history of anarchism in Aotearoa/New Zealand from the mid-1950s to the early 1980s" pp. 8–25
- Clarke, Michael (1982) "The Politics of Pop Festivals", chapter four 'The Development of Free Festivals, 1973–1976'
- Cloonan, Martin (1996) "Banned!: censorship of popular music in Britain, 1967–92"
- Coombs, Anne (1996) "Sex and Anarchy: the Life and Death of the Sydney Push" (Viking), pp. 182–186.
- Dwyer, Bill (1968) "Anarchy Now!", pamphlet published by the Federation of Australian Anarchists, Sydney South, N.S.W.
- McKay, George (1996) Senseless Acts of Beauty: Cultures of Resistance since the Sixties, chapter one 'The free festivals and fairs of Albion'
