= Alan Lodge =

Alan Lodge, portrait 1998

Alan Lodge (born 1953 in Luton, Bedfordshire), also known as 'Tash', is an English photographer based in Nottingham who has focused on alternative movements since the mid 1970s.

After a short career as an emergency paramedic in the London Ambulance Service, Lodge took up photography and photographed the early 'free festivals' in 1978. In 1985 Lodge joined the Peace Convoy on its way to Stonehenge where a festival was planned to take place and he photographed 'the Battle of the Beanfield'. In 1987 Lodge published a booklet, Stonehenge: Solstice Ritual, a photographic account of the rituals taking place at Stonehenge.

Since the events at Stonehenge, Lodge has covered a range of issues including the Travellers movement, Reclaim the Streets, the road protests in the mid 1990s and the campaign against the Criminal Justice and Public Order Act 1994. Lodge is also known for his documentation of police surveillance. Since the late 1990s Lodge has been a major contributor to the media network Indymedia.

In 1998 Privacy International presented Lodge with a "Winston Award" for his work documenting police surveillance.

== See also ==
- Photojournalism
- DIY Culture
