= Wally Hope =

UK free festival organiser (1947–1975)

Philip Alexander Grahame Russell (9 August 1947 – 3 September 1975), known as Wally Hope, was an experimental philosopher of the UK Underground and organiser of the Windsor Free Festival and the Stonehenge Free Festival.

== Biography ==
=== Activities and adoption of new name ===
While in London during the early 1970s, he fell in with a group called the Dwarves, taking their name from the Dutch Provo group the Kabouters. Described as "a kind of Notting Hill version of the Yippies in America: a joke-prankster group", he adopted the name "Wally Hope" for himself, under which he would acquire the status of countercultural folk hero. The name Wally derived from a popular festival cry (a kind of "Everyman" joke that arose when the crowd began echoing the name of a lost dog being summoned by his owner at the last Isle of Wight Festival) and he had the word "Hope" embroidered on a shirt that his grandmother had embroidered for him "became his trademark: a riot of spectacular colour with the eye of Horus in the middle banked by a rainbow".

=== Stonehenge Free Festival ===
See Stonehenge Free Festival

Whilst at a well-known hippie café on the Spanish Island of Ibiza he first came up with the idea of a free festival at Stonehenge. He "wanted to claim back Stonehenge (a place that he regarded as sacred to the people and stolen by the government) and make it a site for free festivals, free music, free space, free mind".

The first Stonehenge Free Festival happened from midsummer in June of 1974; and then, in September of that year, after the violent dispersal of the Windsor Free Festival by police on Wednesday 28 August 1974, some who had witnessed the police brutality in Windsor Great Park walked to Wiltshire, and set up in a field alongside a by-way off the A344, within sight of Stonehenge, and some distance to the West of it. Despite a leafleting campaign and promotion by Radio Caroline, it was a small gathering, numbering about 500 people at the most. The only music was provided by early synth pioneers Zorch, who set up stage facing the stones, and who had to cope with a poor PA system.

The festival might have had little impact if it had stopped soon after midsummer, Wally had persuaded some thirty people to remain, on National Trust land in the field adjacent to Stonehenge itself. They styled themselves "The Wallies of Wessex" and lived a makeshift, communal lifestyle in tents, a rickety polythene-covered geodesic dome and a small fluorescent tipi. Nigel Ayers, who visited at the time, said, "It was an open camp, inspired by a diversity of wild ideas, but with the common purpose of discovering the relevance of this ancient mysterious place by the physical experience of spending a lot of time there".

The Wallies went to court in August, in the newspapers' silly season, and the story was widely reported. They included in their number Sir Wally Raleigh and Wally Woof the Dog, they gave their address as "Fort Wally, c/o God, Jesus and Buddha, Garden of Allah, Stonehenge Monument, Salisbury, Wiltshire", and they had a snappy motto: "Every Body is Wally, Every Day is Sun Day". The fancy dress went down well too, with Phil appearing in the uniform of an officer of the Cypriot National Guard. When they lost the case, Phil told the press: "These legal arguments are like a cannon ball bouncing backwards and forwards in blancmange. We won, because we hold Stonehenge in our hearts. We are not squatters, we are men of God. We want to plant a Garden of Eden with apricots and cherries, where there will be guitars instead of guns and the sun will be our nuclear bomb".

After the court case, when threatened with eviction, they moved from "Fort Wally" to another site on the other side of the by-way, and continued their festival there, until after the winter solstice some of the group moved into a squat house in the nearby town of Amesbury, whilst Hope went off to Cyprus.

=== Death ===
In May 1975, whilst stopping at the Amesbury squat on a trip from London to Cornwall, an unexpected police raid resulted in Wally's arrest for possession of a small amount of LSD. This led to remand and he was committed to a psychiatric hospital. He was eventually released showing symptoms of chronic dyskinesia caused by hospital medication. Wally died on 3 September 1975 at the home of family members in Chipping Ongar in Essex. A coroner's verdict of suicide included no reference to the Old Manor psychiatric hospital in Salisbury.

His friend Penny Rimbaud has credited him with much of the inspiration behind Rimbaud's project Crass and believes that Phil did not commit suicide but was murdered by the State for political reasons. He was believed to belong to a wealthy family, from which he would inherit a considerable sum when he attained the age of 30 years; his guardian was the BBC radio and television announcer John Snagge, according to a newspaper report of Wally's death. Wally's funeral was celebrated the following year at the festival on the solstice. He is survived by his mother Johanne Russell and half sister Vanessa Russell

== See also ==
- Stonehenge Free Festival
- The Wallys
