= Coole Mountain =

Coole Mountain Cúil an Mhóinteáin (Irish)
- Commune
- Interactive map of Coole Mountain
- Coordinates: 51°47′11.15″N 9°11′45.40″W
- Country: Ireland
- Province: Munster
- County: Cork

Population (2010)
  - Total: Approximately 200
- Time zone: UTC±0 (WET)
  - Summer (DST): UTC+1 (IST)

Coole Mountain (also referred to as Coolmountain, Irish: Cúil an Mhóinteáin, meaning 'Back of the Mountain') near Dunmanway in north-west County Cork, Ireland is a counterculture community established in the late 1970s by New Age travellers (Note: Not to be confused with Irish travellers) and Hippies predominantly from the United Kingdom. The community focuses on off-grid living, environmental sustainability, and anti-consumerist practices.

== History ==
Coole Mountain became a notable site for alternative living in Ireland beginning in the late 1970s. During this period, a wave of New Age travellers, many of them originally from the United Kingdom, arrived in the area. They were drawn by the availability of inexpensive rural land, Ireland's romantic image as a pastoral and spiritual refuge, and a desire to escape what they saw as the alienation and harshness of urban life in Britain, especially under the policies of Margaret Thatcher who came into power in 1979. They were part of a wider small-scale wave of immigration from the United Kingdom to different parts of West Cork that had begun in the 1960s.

The bulk of Coole Mountain's community arrived from the UK in the 1980s during the peak of Thatcherism. In particular, the introduction of the Poll tax was considered a major push factor.

During the 1980s and 1990s, Coole Mountain developed into a loosely organised community guided by ecological awareness, spiritual exploration, and anti-consumerist values. Residents built their own homes, often using salvaged materials, and lived in dwellings that included handmade shacks, caravans, and converted buses. Many practised subsistence farming, herbal medicine, crafts, and informal forms of trade and barter. While some drew state welfare, others participated in local seasonal work. A shared commitment to simplicity, cooperation, and ecological living helped sustain the community, despite its internal diversity of beliefs.

In the early 2000s, a new generation at Coole Mountain introduced raves to the location. The arrival of some individuals and the changes in the community contributed to a negative reputation in certain circles. According to residents, the Irish media frequently adopted a sensationalist tone when reporting on Coole Mountain, occasionally linking Coole Mountain to criminal incidents without confirmed evidence or consulting local residents. For example, in 1997 local Gardai stated that local newspaper reports of Coole Mountain harbouring "paedophiles, fraudsters and other serious criminals" were "over the top and untrue" while in 2014 the Irish Examiner confirmed that a convicted rapist was not residing at Coole Mountain since his release from prison, contrary to local rumours.

Relations between the Coole Mountain community and the surrounding areas varied. Some community members experienced suspicion or criticism from locals who viewed their alternative lifestyle with scepticism, particularly due to their reliance on social welfare. Others were more warmly received and became known for their participation in local markets and festivals. Inside the community itself, tensions occasionally arose over differing views on communal living, personal responsibility, and the interpretation of spiritual or ecological ideals. Scholars such as Carmen Kuhling began to document the group in the early 2000s, describing Coole Mountain as an example of a “neo-tribal” response to modern alienation. Kuhling emphasised how the community redefined ideas of work, identity, and belonging in contrast to the dominant values of capitalism and individualism.

By the 2000s, the Coole Mountain community had become more dispersed and less visible. Some original members continued to live in the area, maintaining small-scale, off-grid homes and a way of life rooted in environmental values. Others have left or integrated more into mainstream society.

In 2010, the Irish Examiner described the "New Age Traveller" population of Coole Mountain as "200 strong".

In 2021, community member Fred Callow published a memoir based around his time living at Coole Mountain, titled Blow-In: Notes from a Community on the Edge. The book reflects on the experience of joining the off-grid community in the 1990s and 2000s, offering insights into daily life, interpersonal dynamics, and the wider cultural significance of alternative living in rural Ireland.
