= Wally (anonymous) =

British English expression

Wally is a British English expression referring to a "silly or inept person", which later developed into an umbrella term for "vulnerable individuals".

It is thought to have originated at a pop festival in the late 1960s or early 1970s; many sources suggest the 1970 Isle of Wight Festival. It was still being called out at the 1979 Led Zeppelin Knebworth Concerts.

In 1974 a group of new age travellers were encamped near Stonehenge, and to help hinder the process of eviction by the landowners, all gave their name as Wally of Wessex, "Wally being a conveniently anonymous umbrella for vulnerable individuals".

== See also ==
- John Doe
- Karen Eliot
- Open pop star
