= Dragon Festival =

Spanish festival

The Dragon Festival is a Spanish free festival which ran from 1997 to 2009, held at Los Cigarrones on the riverbed of the Rio Guadalfeo, 2 km to the south of Órgiva, and from 2010 at Santa Fé, Granada, Spain, during the month of March, and culminating on the weekend nearest the March equinox. The festival is a celebration of various alternative cultures and includes live music and theater.

== History ==
The town of Órgiva (a garrison town that marked a front line throughout the Spanish Civil War) is renowned now for its alternative 'hippy' scene.

In 1996, flooding washed away a huge swath of land in Cigarrones, clearing the way for a gathering. On March 14, 1997 a huge sail depicting a jolly dragon was raised in Cigarrones and the Dragon Festival was born. The hundred or so people present could never have imagined that by 2001 nearly 10,000 people would attend.

Although the majority of people who had bought land at Cigarrones were party to the festival, the idea of so many people turning up for a 'wild weekend' which on occasions continued for weeks, inevitably caused some rifts in the community.

Police presence had been virtually nonexistent but by 2002 the festival's increasing size was attracting the attention of the local Partido Popular (PP) majority council. The Mayor placed a prohibition order on the festival and called in police reinforcements in order to create a noticeable police presence.

The Dragon Festival was causing a national media stir, firstly because banning a fiesta in Andalucia was simply unheard of but mostly because two people had died at the festival in 2002.

== Prohibition attempt ==
In 2003 an attempt was made by the authorities to prevent the Dragon Festival taking place with the heavy of Guardia Civil in the road leading to the festival site. However, the impending Iraq war gave voice to the festival's call for peace. For several weeks, residents from the festival site, daily dressed in pink and sang their way to the police line to offer the police tea and cakes. On the eve of the festival the police stepped aside, allowing the festival to take place.

Local elections brought a new Partido Socialista Obrero Español (PSOE - center-left) Mayoress to power who had previously been quite vocal about 'embracing' the Dragon Festival, however it was unanimously felt in the festival community that any interface with the local authorities was not the way to go since it could mean restrictive regulations and control.

== Local opposition ==
Over the years, a few members of the Cigarrones neighborhood had made their opposition to the festival known.

Early in 2009 a huge earth moving vehicle arrived at the festival site with support from the Guardia Civil and one member of the Policia Local. They proceeded to excavate holes two meters deep and two meters wide across the entire festival site, claiming they were for a tree planting project. More than two thousand holes were excavated across public land making it impossible to park anywhere, so if there was to be a 2009 Dragon Festival it would only be possible on the relatively small areas of pro-festival owners' land left without holes.

Two days before the 2009 Spring Equinox a prohibition order was posted proclaiming a ban on the Dragon Festival on grounds of health and safety and that anyone found organizing the event would be charged and if convicted, receive hefty fines.

== Prosecutions ==
Within days of the posting of the prohibition order, seven pro-festival land owners received paperwork telling them they had been found guilty on an 'administrative' charge (ie.. ignoring a local authorities' ban) and had each been fined the sum of thirty thousand and fifty Euros. Failure to pay would mean the seizure of any assets, including their land.

The charge against three people were dropped but the remaining four people have taken their case to the Crown Court in Granada on the grounds that nothing was done to enforce the ban on the festival in 2009 so in their defense, these land owners claim that they could have done little themselves to stop it even if they had wanted to.

The court cases were resolved with the exception of one against Mr Alex Brimmel. Mr Brimmel's lawyer claims the charges against Mr Brimmel brought by the Town Hall should have expired but the Town Hall bypassed normal channels so the case cannot be resolved. Mr Brimmel has brought a case against the Town Hall for unconstitutional practices in order to resolve his case.

== Relocation ==
The long wet winter of 2009/2010 once again flooded Cigarrones, filling in most of the holes and cutting off access, effectively stopping any large gathering in 2010.

In 2010 an estimated 1500 people created a free festival in Santa Fe, 4 km to the west of Granada (60 km north of Orgiva) and is widely perceived as the new home of the Dragon Festival.

The Dragon Festival continues at Santa Fe.
