= London Street Commune =

1960s social movement

Coordinates: 51.5037°N 0.1497°W

An image captures the moment police raid the "Hippydilly" squat at Piccadilly Circus.

London Street Commune was a hippy movement formed during the 1960s. It aimed to highlight concerns about rising levels of homelessness and to house the hundreds of hippies sleeping in parks and derelict buildings in central London.

The commune famously squatted a mansion at 144 Piccadilly on Hyde Park Corner in September 1969, which became a media sensation dubbed "Hippydilly". The group was quickly evicted in a high-profile Metropolitan Police operation and other squatting attempts were also rebuffed. One of the leaders of the commune who often spoke to the media was known as 'Dr. John' He was actually Phil Cohen, who later became an urban ethnographer and emeritus professor at the University of East London.

== Origins of the group ==
In 1967 roughly 20 Hippies (Note: This terminology is possibly retroactive, and at the time these people may have self-identified as "Freaks", a term that preceded "Hippy" in many parts of the world. Either term at the time referred to Non-conformists from mainstream society) had begun squatting around the area of Piccadilly Circus in London. At some point Phil Cohen, operating under the alias "Dr. John", became involved with these squatters and began to organise them into a more politicised force. Under John's influence, the squatters occupied several squats, including one inside a Church opposite the Oasis public baths on Endell Street.

During an interview with Birmingham Daily Post in the time period, Dr John described the background and goals of the group as follows:

The London Street Commune was formed to defend the interests of beat groups around Piccadilly and to dissolve control of the streets from the police and back into the community. We want Piccadilly to become a real people’s forum, a forum for the understanding which would act as a resistance against all institutions like the family, the school, detention centres, and so on, which exist to domesticate us compulsorily into the non-values of straight society.

Less visible members were far less ideological and simply sought the creation of a homeless shelter around Piccadilly.

== Hippydilly ==
=== Occupation ===
Around 200 hippy squatters occupied 144 Piccadilly in September 1969. The building was a mansion built by Sir Drummond Smith in the late 1790s, which had been lived in by Lord Palmerston when he became prime minister in 1855. The building had been significantly damaged during the London Blitz in World War II, and came into possession of Alexander Korda, who based his film production company out of the building. In approximately 1960 the London branch of the Arts Educational Schools took control of the building, however their residence was brief and they abandoned the building at some point in the mid-1960s. The building had thus been vacant for several years before the events of September 1969.

When the London Street Commune took control of the building, they found to their surprise that it still had running water and working electricity, as well as operating elevators. The London Street Commune also realised that a dry moat surrounded the building so they built a makeshift drawbridge to control the entrance. The place quickly became known as Hippydilly. Amongst the squatters was Sid Rawle, who would later become a mainstay of the British hippy and squatter movements.

Intensive media coverage made the occupation a sensation and the number of people on the street outside never dropped below 500. Up until the eviction, most police activity was dedicated to controlling the violent right-wing elements in the crowd who wanted to attack the squat. In one incident, five motorbikes were set on fire. An eighteen-year-old squatter welcomed in the press and made £300 in five days giving supposedly exclusive interviews to the mainstream newspapers about fictional orgies and drugs binges.

Despite its short lifespan, the squat attracted many visitors. The Commune had planned to occupy the building peacefully and argue their need for housing in court, but the attacks from police and skinheads meant that things began to go out of control. The Commune invited members of the Hells Angels biker gang to act as security and they began to take over the building.

=== Eviction ===
The Daily Mirror reported on 18 September 1969 that a High Court Judge had ordered that 144 Piccadilly be returned to the "Amalgamated West End Development and Property Trust". In response to the court order Dr John declared the London Street Commune would violently resist, and they barricaded the building. John publicly declared "We shall use as much force and violence as is needed to stay in the building".

Skirmishes between the squatters and those outside the building broke out over the following days. Things escalated when the squatters discovered some brightly coloured plastic boules in the basement of the building. After filling them with water, the squatters hurled them at their opponents. In the aftermath, rumours began circulating in the press that petrol bombs were being created and would be soon introduced into the situation.

On 21 September 1969 Commanding police officer Chief Inspector Michael Rowling told the occupants that a woman was giving birth and needed assistance, so the Commune lowered the drawbridge to allow access. It was at that point Rowling ordered his force to storm the building and 200 police swarmed in. The operation took just three minutes to clear the building.

Almost 100 people were arrested during the eviction, most were immediately released again the same day.

=== Aftermath ===
The next day, mainstream the press reported as follows: Daily Mirror - Fall of Hippy Castle; The Times - Squatters ousted by police commando; Daily Telegraph - Police rout Piccadilly Hippies. In a 2019 retrospective article, the BBC described newspaper coverage of the squat as "negative and sensationalist", with reporters contributing to the event becoming a media circus.

The London Street Commune argued that the police had performed an illegal eviction since they had no possession order.

Property developer Ronald Lyon was so impressed with the police action that he went to West End Central police station and donated £1000.

Days after the Piccadilly eviction, Sid Rawle was invited to a talk with John Lennon and Yoko Ono, who subsequently offered him the use of Dorinish, an island off the coast of County Mayo in the Republic of Ireland which Lennon had purchased in 1967. Rawle and a few dozen hippies, many of whom had been involved in Hippydilly, would camp on Dorinish for a few years before the project was abandoned.

The building stood empty for three years and then was demolished despite its listed status. It is now the site of the InterContinental London Park Lane hotel.

==== Political reaction ====
Conservative politicians condemned the London Street Commune; Tory MP John Biggs-Davison told the Reading Evening Post that London was being overrun by "hippies, anarchists and layabouts" while former minister Enoch Powell's take away from the events were that hippies were out to "repudiate authority and destroy it". Leader of the Conservative Party Edward Heath took a more benign view, with the Birmingham Daily Post reporting that Heath thought "hippies were a limited phenomenon. In every generation, there was something of that kind but it should not be forgotten that there were millions of young people in Britain who were not following the hippy life."

== Other actions ==
After Hippydilly, the London Street Commune moved to a previously squatted school at Endell Street in Covent Garden. This was evicted after a few days in another large police operation. There were 63 arrests and one month later 32 people were still being held at Ashford Remand Centre. Of these, eight were singled out as ringleaders and charged under the Forcible Entry Act 1429. All eight were found guilty after a trial at Lewes Crown Court, but the punishments varied. Two people were jailed for nine months, two were sent to detention centres, three were given suspended sentences and one was fined £20.

An office building in Russell Square in Bloomsbury was then occupied but its occupants quickly evicted.

== See also ==
- Homelessness in England
