= Summer Solstice at Stonehenge =

Annual event

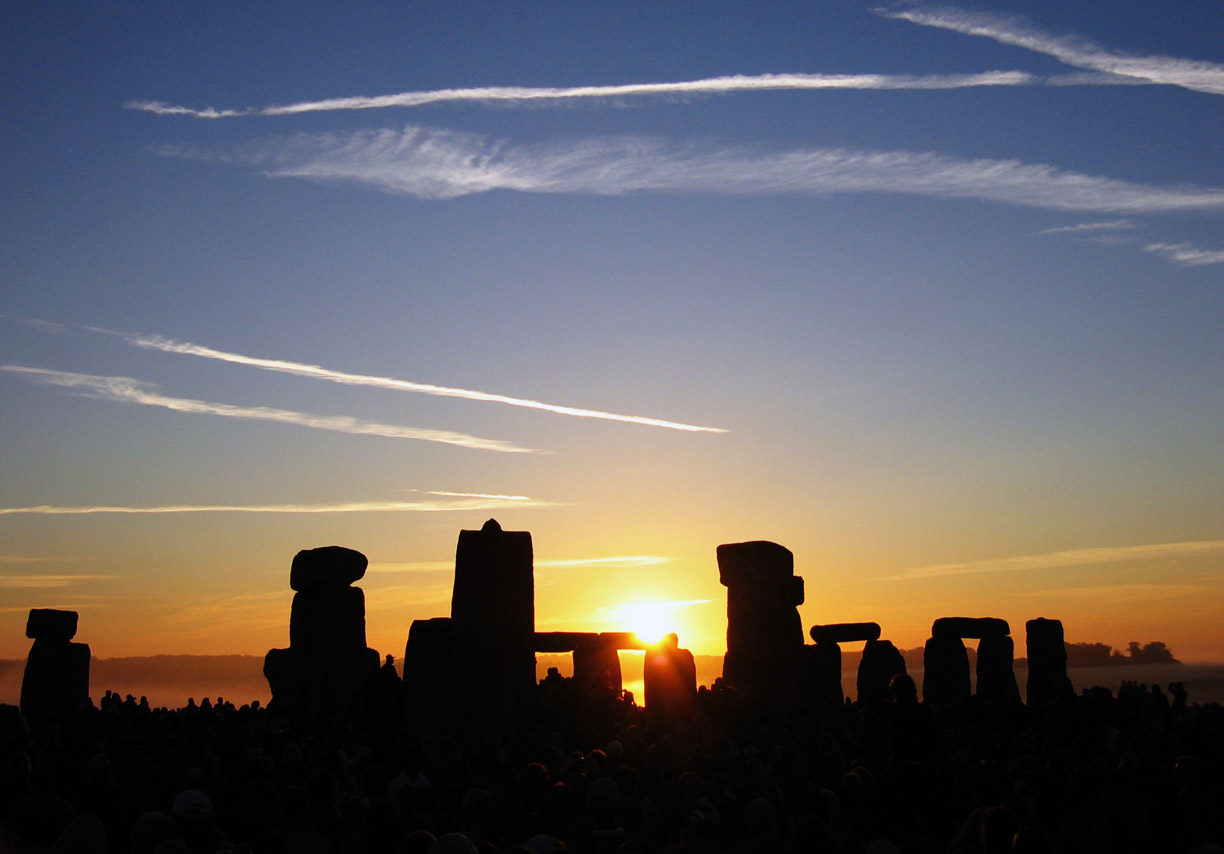
In 2005

Summer Solstice at Stonehenge is an annual event which takes place on the evening of the 20th and the morning of 21st June. The monument is aligned towards the sunrise on the summer solstice and sunset on the winter solstice. Stonehenge is a place of worship to Neo-Druids, Pagans and other "Earth based' or 'old' religions.

== History ==
Apart from a few interested visitors, the first recorded summer solstice gatherings started to occur after the opening of the railway to Salisbury in 1859 as a connecting point. According to Andy Worthington in his book Stonehenge Celebration and Subversion the solstice initially became of note to antiquarians and aristocratic patrons, followed by locals on foot, bicycles, horse drawn carriages. A party atmosphere was often present. By the turn of the twentieth century Druid revivalists started to hold ceremonies with groups of onlookers and the site was fenced for the first time. The arrival of motorised vehicles also facilitated larger attendances, particularly when a solstice coincided with a weekend. Other influences included the Beaulieu Jazz Festivals of the 1950s, British Folk Revival, Folk Rock, Modern Paganism, Psychedelic Music and the Right to Roam combined with the American influences of the Merry Pranksters and the Woodstock Festival and the greater social freedoms of the post war period. By the early 1970s the site become a focus for counterculture and a free festival emerged. This ended in the so-called Battle of the Beanfield in 1985. Access was then restricted for the next few years until the High Court ruled the exclusion zone unlawful and the modern Open Access was created at the turn of the millennium. Today, an eclectic range of people travel from far and wide to celebrate the solstice with relatively few problems.

== Open Access Gatherings ==
This solstice is one of the few times a year the general public can enter the main circle for free. The other times are the winter solstice and spring and autumnal equinoxes. The main focus of the gathering is based around the sunset, the night time vigil and observing the sunrise. Various ceremonies and rituals also take place, as well as the playing of acoustic music, dancing and singing. People also touch the stones at these times. Please see list of past gatherings as below.

Year	Sunrise Report	Stonehenge summer solstice gatherings
2026	Reasonably clear	Access extended by half an hour until 08:30. All car parking pre-book and pre-pay with the charge rising to £25. (20,000)
2025	Reasonably clear	English Heritage outsource livestreaming of the solstice to a specialist company. Car park charge rises from £15 to £20. The A303 closed overnight due to high volumes of traffic. Large crowd due to good weather. (25,000)
2024	Clear sunrise	The gathering passed off peacefully despite a Just Stop Oil protest a few days earlier. (15,000)
2023	Misty morning	BBC Radio Wiltshire present the last annual sunrise broadcast from the stones before all-night programming transferred to Radio5 live. Thousands gather for the summer solstice. (10,000)
2022	Cloudy	First official gathering since lockdown. (6,000)
2021	Cloudy	Despite solstice access being officially cancelled due to on-going lockdown restrictions, a couple of hundred people still managed to enter the site.
2020	Sunday morning	Solstice gathering cancelled due to lockdown restrictions.
2019	Clear	Weekend solstice Friday night, sunrise on Saturday morning. (10,000)
2018	Clear sunrise	Centenary of the gifting of Stonehenge to the nation by local barrister Cecil Chubb. (9,500)
2017	Reasonably clear	Extra security measures put in place. (13,000)
2016	Clear	Alcohol ban and car parking charges introduced. Full moon in conjunction with the night of the celebrations. (12,000)
2015	Clear	Thousands mark the summer solstice at Stonehenge. (23,000)
2014	Reasonably clear	The BBC Culture Show broadcast a 'Battle for Stonehenge' special featuring the new visitor centre and a history of open access. (37,500)
2013	Grey cloud	BBC Sky at Night films a 'Solstice Special' during the celebrations. (21,000)
2012	Heavy rain	The Ancestor sculpture returned to Stonehenge for a second time. Transit of Venus earlier in the month on 6 June. (14,500)
2011	Rain and cloud	Heavy rain dampens the proceedings. (18,000)
2010	Reasonably clear	A 6.7 m high metal sculpture called 'The Ancestor' was displayed. (22,000)
2009	Cloudy brighter later	Access time brought forward again to 19:00 (7pm). (36,500)
2008	Cloudy with some rain	Access time brought forward to 20:00. Final appearance of the King's Drummers Bateria samba band before Health and Safety regulations stopped future torch lit parades at the stones. (36,290)
2007	Cloudy, brighter later	Access times altered to 20:30 to 08:00. Glastonbury Festival starts the next day. (24,093)
2006	Rain and cloud	England vs Sweden in the FIFA World Cup on the evening of 20 June results in many arriving late and heavy rain leads to a lower attendance. Access times 22:00 to 09:00. (18,700)
2005	Clear sunrise	Monday night, Tuesday morning. (21,000)
2004	Misty	BBC2 broadcast a two part documentary on the National Trust (The Stones) featuring negotiations around summer solstice access. Transit of Venus earlier in the month on 8 June. (21,000)
2003	Clear	Agreement reached to continue holding access on the established date of the 20 / 21 June. Access times to the stones altered to 02:00 to 12:00 noon, although in practice access to monument field occurred around 01:00. (30,000)
2002	Rain	Many leave early to watch England play Brazil in the FIFA World Cup. (22,000)
2001	Clear	Access times extended to eleven hours running from 22:00 to 09:00. (10,000)
2000	Heavy rain	First year of Managed Open Access, entry times to the stones 23:30 on 20 June to 07:30 on 21 June. (6,000)

Directions of sunrise and sunset at Stonehenge on the 21st of each month, where 𝜙 is its latitude and 𝜀 is Earth's axial tilt

== See also ==
- Avebury – Neolithic henge monument in Wiltshire, England
- Cultural depictions of Stonehenge
- Manhattanhenge – Solar phenomenon in Manhattan, New York City
- Winter Solstice at Stonehenge
