= Phil Cohen (cultural theorist) =

British cultural theorist and educationist (1943–2024)

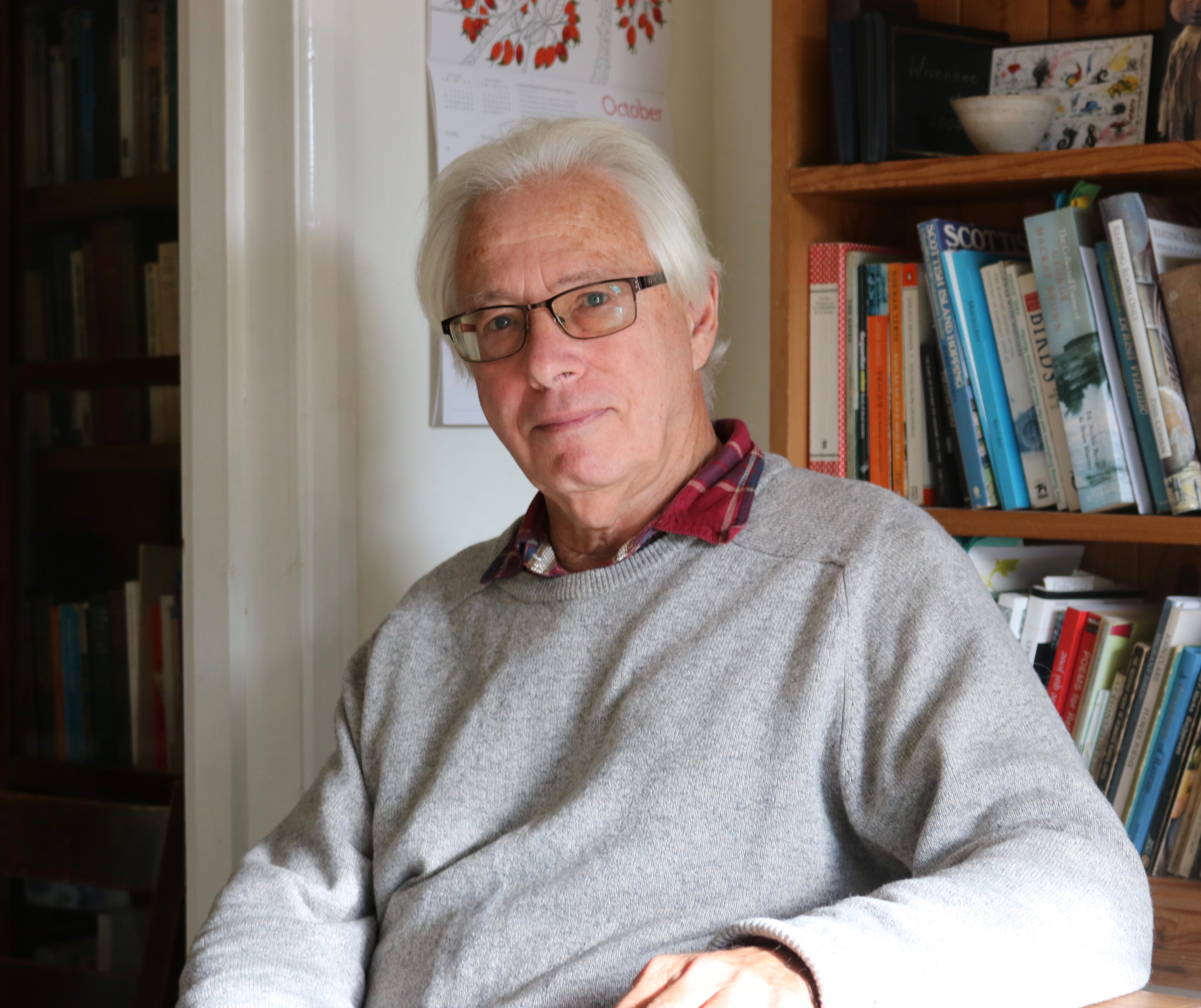
- Cohen in 2017
- Born: 1943; London, England
- Died: 7 November 2024 (aged 81); Wivenhoe, Essex, England
- Occupations: Writer and cultural activist
- Known for: Sociology of youth culture; impact of urban regeneration on working class culture; theories of racism and identity. Also a high profile leader of squatters rights movement in London (1960–1970s).
- Spouse(s): Jean McNeil, painter

Academic background
- Education: St Paul's School
- Alma mater: University of Cambridge; University of East London (PhD by publication)
- Influences: Basil Bernstein; Gregory Bateson; Michail Bakhtin; Bruno Latour

Academic work
- Discipline: Sociologist, ethnographer
- Website: https://philcohenworks.com/

Phil Cohen (1943 – 7 November 2024) was a British cultural theorist, urban ethnographer, community activist, educationalist and poet. He was involved in the London underground counter-culture scene and gained public notoriety as "Dr John", a leader in the squatter's rights movement, but became better known for his work on youth culture and the impact of urban regeneration on working-class communities, particularly in East London, with a focus on issues of race and popular racism. More recently the scope of his work widened to include issues of identity politics, memory and loss, and the future of the Left in Britain. His most recent writing and research focuses on the transformation of object relations within digital capitalism, especially in relation to the COVID-19 pandemic and the environmental crisis, and shortly before his death he embarked on a series of collaborative book projects with graphic artists.

Cohen's academic work is trans-disciplinary and draws on concepts from linguistics and narratology, psycho-analysis and anthropology, cultural history and social phenomenology. As of 2024, he was emeritus Professor at the Centre for Cultural Studies at the University of East London, and a member of the Livingmaps Network, which he founded in 2013. Cohen was also a member of Compass, a Gramscian think tank within the Labour Party, and he was on the editorial board of New Formations. His work has been translated into French, German, Swedish, Italian, French and Japanese.

== Early life and education ==
Phil Cohen was born into a medical family living in Bloomsbury, Central London. He was educated at St Paul's School, London, where he studied classics and history and won an exhibition to read history at Queens' College, Cambridge, in 1962. At Queens', he was one of a number of talented London-raised Jewish undergraduate historians, which included Paul Ginsborg (who was also a pupil at St Paul's), Jonathan Israel and Robert Wistrich. In 1965, Cohen dropped out of university and after a period of travelling, including work on trawlers, he became involved in the London underground counterculture scene; he subsequently became a community and youth worker in London.

Cohen was married to the late Pam Brighton, the theatre director, and their son, Ned, was born in 1970. He and Pam divorced in 1978 and in 1987 he married Jean McNeil, the painter. They adopted a son, Stephen, who died of an alcohol-related illness in 2013 at the age of 33. This event is a central reference point in much of the creative writing Cohen produced since then. Cohen's grandfather was a Jewish revolutionary from Vitebsk who emigrated to live in Glasgow before the First World War and was the subject of a recent prose poem.

== Youth culture and the alternative society (1965–1978) ==
Working as an assistant to the conceptual artist John Latham, Cohen scripted "happenings" with Latham and Jeff Nuttall at Better Books, and was involved in the Wholly Communion Poetry Event and the Dialectics of Liberation conference. He also wrote for the underground paper International Times. For a time, he was associated with the English Situationist group King Mob and its journal King Mob Echo and took an active part in several of its "provocations". In 1968, he became involved in a squat at the Bell Hotel in Covent Garden, out of which the London Street Commune movement emerged. Mass squats were organised in a number of prominent public buildings in Central London, culminating in the 1969 occupation of the Queen Mother's ex-residence at 144 Piccadilly, which became known as "Hippydilly" and made world headline news. As one of the leaders of the movement who spoke to the media, Cohen's pseudonym "Dr John" featured in newsreel reports and the national press. British Pathe described the occupiers as "scroungers and hell raisers" and Dr John "the hippy squatter" briefly became a figure of fear in what he later described as a hysterical moral panic about the perceived threat that squatting posed to home ownership and private property.

Following the closing down of the street commune squats, Cohen worked as a detached youth worker for the Soho Project, and then set up Street Aid as a legal advice and self-help organisation for homeless young people in Central London, based initially in Soho and then Covent Garden. In 1975/6, with a group of fellow Leftists including David Robins, Cohen occupied a derelict pub near King's Cross and turned it into a radical cultural and education centre for local estate youth. The pub was burned down in mysterious circumstances. Knuckle Sandwich: growing up in the working class city (1978), written by Cohen and Robins, gives a detailed account of the project and situates it within an analysis of urban working-class youth culture.

These experiences led Cohen to develop a Gramscian perspective on post-war youth subcultures in Britain spelt out in a working paper published by the Centre for Contemporary Cultural Studies (CCCS) in 1972 "Sub-cultural Conflict and Working Class Community" which subsequently provided the basis for a CCCS book, Resistance through Rituals, edited by Stuart Hall and Tony Jefferson. The paper has since been translated into eight European languages and become something of a classic. In this text, Cohen develops the notion of youth cultures as collective responses to structural shifts in class identity formation, creating distinct sets of imaginary class relations though specific codes of dress, behaviour, music and language. This analysis was initially applied to Mods and Skinheads, in East London and subsequently to Beats and Hippies. In later work, this initial focus on the youth question broadened to include issues of inter-generational transmission, coming-of-age stories and ideas surrounding different life phases.

== Interventions in vocational and anti-racist education (1979–1992) ==
In 1978, Cohen joined the Sociological Research Unit at the University of London's Institute of Education, run by Basil Bernstein and Michael Young, carrying out two research projects funded by the Leverhulme Trust into youth cultures and changing school transitions. This led to a series of publications challenging the "new vocationalism" and the youth training schemes then being introduced by the Conservative government under Margaret Thatcher with the aim of inculcating the values of "enterprise culture".

Moving to the Post-16 Centre at the Institute, Cohen collaborated with the Cockpit Cultural Studies Centre to produce a series of photographic exhibitions working with early-leavers focusing on their experience of schooling and issues of working class aspiration, gender identity, and ethnicity. The No Kidding Project, funded by the Greater London Council (GLC) produced learning materials to support alternative, more critical forms of vocational education. The theoretical framework for this was developed in a number of articles. This critical pedagogy was then further developed in the field of anti-racist education in a series of initiatives, films and teaching resources designed to offer an alternative to moral, symbolic and doctrinaire forms of anti-racism. These included:

- Playgrounds of Prejudice, an ethnographic study of playground cultures in Dockland schools. This was supported by a film of the same title, analysing a playground fight between an Irish and a Black boy.
- Ananse meets Spiderwoman, a learning resource pack for primary schools, published by the British Film Institute.
- Anansi Rap Attack: a poster produced with the Art of Change.
- Empires of the Mind, a film produced by the Open University for the course on "Race, Culture, Difference".
- Tricks of the Trade: a project film, including an interview with Stuart Hall.

This teaching material was supported by a number of theoretical texts, including chapters in an Open University course reader, and in the Blackwell reader in Racial and Ethnic Studies.

During this period, Cohen co-edited with Angela McRobbie the Youth Questions series for Macmillan. His own books published in the series included Multi-Racist Britain (1994) and Rethinking the Youth Question: education, labour and cultural studies (1997), which brought together all his academic research on youth culture and schooling.

== From race to regeneration (1992–2012) ==
Cohen moved to the University of East London (UEL) in 1992 to set up and direct the Centre for New Ethnicities Research (CNER). The centre embarked on a programme of research and community engagement in East London around issues of popular racism and cultural identity. This included curating Rich Mix (2001), an exhibition of multicultural art in Tower Hamlets and a major conference Front Lines, Backyards (1998) which explored issues surrounding changing identifications people might make when confronted by rapid social and demographic change. Research projects included ethnographic studies of frontline situations of racial conflict in East London, a funded research programme on young people's perceptions of class, gender and ethnicity in two areas of London and Hamburg whose results were published as Finding the Way Home (2004); The centre organised a programme of talks and working papers, some of which was published in New Ethnicities, Old Racisms. The centre's work was influential, especially in directing attention to the deeper, more unconscious, reaches of the popular racist imagination. However, the use of psychoanalytic and anthropological concepts to understand the interplay of myth, ritual and phantasy in the construction of "common sense" racist narratives was controversial, especially among Marxist critics, who took this work to be symptomatic of false consciousness and an issue of Race and Class was devoted to attacking the centre's work.

In 2004, Cohen set up and co-directed the London East Research Institute (LERI), with the aim of co-ordinating the university's research on the regeneration of East London, which was gathering pace at this time and included UEL's new campus in the Royal Docks. Initially, the research concentrated on the Thames Gateway, the largest regeneration project in Europe at the time and this led to the publication of London's Turning, a collection of studies of different aspects of the eastwards turn in London's growth. With the announcement of London's bid for the 2012 Olympic Games and the decision to locate the main venue at Stratford, East London, the focus of LERI's work inevitably shifted to evaluating the impact on local communities of the rapid transformation of the area from industrial and residential use to hosting a world mega-event. Cohen conducted an ethnographic study of tunnellers and construction workers in the initial Dig, Design and Demolish phase and established ongoing focus groups with local residents and young people to chart their response to the unfolding impact of the Olympic project. This material formed the basis of his book On the Wrong Side of the Track: East London and the Post Olympics? in which Cohen explores the rhetoric and reality of the 2012 Olympic project and a follow-up study features in London 2012 and the Post Olympic City: a hollow Legacy? (2017). This concern with the Olympic Legacy inspired the Groundbreakers, an immersive trail and online guide telling the back story the Olympic Park site from the Bronze Age to the digital age.

== From urban ethnography to critical cartography (2013 onwards) ==
Cohen's approach to ethnography from the outset had a strong spatial as well as visual emphasis and he experimented with narrative mapping methods in research with young people around issues of public safety and danger. This interest was further developed with the setting up of Livingmaps, a network of artists, activists and academics to develop the theory and practice of participatory mapping in work with communities on the front line of urban regeneration. He was the network's research director and editor at large of its online journal, Living Maps Review. The network runs a programme of public events and delivers a variety of mapping projects in partnership with schools, community organisations and local authorities. These have included Speaking Out of Place funded by the London Legacy Corporation, a participatory action research project working with residents and young people living and studying in the ex-Olympic village at Stratford East London. Outputs included a Young People's Map and Guide to the Olympic Park co-produced with students from Chobham Academy School; a video made with young residents exploring local issues of urban planning and an exhibition based on a community photography project. The ethnographic study of East Village was also published as a chapter in London 2012. Recent work includes The Groundbreakers, an audio heritage trail telling the back story of the Olympic Park and the develo0pment of Young Citizens Atlas of Environmental and Social Change, an online platform hosting material produced by a network of young "citizen mappers" in different parts of England. Plans include a toolkit of resources and workshops to train young people in mapping methods to represent issues about the past, present and future of their areas".

== Death ==
On 7 November 2024, Cohen was reported missing. His body was discovered in Wivenhoe, Essex, later that same day. He was 81.

== Research themes ==
Cohen's academic work was trans-disciplinary and drew on concepts from linguistics and narratology, psychoanalysis and anthropology, cultural history and social phenomenology. Early influences were Basil Bernstein's theory of socio-linguistic codes, Gregory Bateson's model of communication and Mikhail Bakhtin's concept of dialogics and more recently Latour's actor-network theory. In his work on social and cultural imaginaries, Cohen also drew on both the post-Kleinian and Lacanian traditions in psychoanalysis.

== Rethinking the youth question ==
Cohen's ground-breaking analysis of youth cultures in the 1960s and 1970s sought to redefine the field of youth studies, away from an empirical investigation of young people's values, attitudes and behaviour and towards a critical perspective of how "youth" was being ideologically constructed and represented in policy and media discourses as a unitary social category. He went on to consider how that was challenged or reproduced in young people's own cultural practices.

== Coming-of-age stories ==
Cohen's recent work has focused on the narrative grammars through which life stories are constructed, and the generational shifts in way "youth" is both imagined and remembered as a formative stage. This field includes an analysis of young adult fiction and contemporary films, as well as written memoirs and oral testimony, gay coming-out stories and how life transitions are managed in contemporary faith communities.

== Attachment to place ==
From the outset Cohen's ethnographic work has been grounded in the specificities of place, as an anchorage of symbolic or moral claims over public amenity and resource as well as a locus of collective identity and belonging. In early work he contrasted rules and rituals of territoriality with protocols of public propriety as two complimentary forms of civic stake holding. In more recent work, this model was refined, drawing on the ideas of Michael Balint and Jay Appleton to outline a psychosocial geography of place attachment.

== Memory politics ==
Cohen's interest in this field originated with the publication of his memoir, Reading Room Only, in 2013 and has been focused on the forms of public commemoration which the Left mobilises and how this relates to the dominant apparatus of fame. In Archive that, Comrade, he develops a model of archival genres and explores the forms of organisation that might be appropriate for the "anarchive" that sets out to challenge or disrupt dominant knowledge power relations. The commemorations of the 50th anniversary of May 1968 provided an occasion for a further reflection of on the nature of political legacy and the organisation of a conference focused around that theme. More recently, Cohen had edited his father's memoir, with an introduction and afterword exploring issues of inter-generational memory.

== There goes the Labourhood ==
One of Cohen's major pre-occupations was the impact of de-industrialisation on working-class community in Britain, especially on its cultures of masculinity and manual labour. His approach to labour history focuses on the split representation of the labouring body into Promethean and abject images, and how this in turn positions communities of labour as either backbones of the nation or a race apart. He argued that these fundamental binaries can either cut across or reinforce more familiar distinctions of occupational skill and moral status. In some of his research, he traced the evolution of these representations within specific social groups especially those who perform "elemental" labour: miners, tunnellers, sweeps, mariners, foundry workers and roustabouts.

== Unconscious racism and its other scene ==
Starting from a critique of reductive psychologies of racism, which reduce it to patterns of prejudice, or individual pathology, Cohen looked for the social structures and cultural norms through which Freud's concept of "narcissism of minor difference" might become racialised. He found these in the autochthonies which feature in myths of origin operating in discourses of nation, people, and race. Cohen argues that it is through these "perversions of inheritance" that the racist imagination gains its purchase on the real and becomes "common sense". If the unconscious is the "discourse of the other" (Lacan) then unconscious racism is the "discourse of the other's discourse of the other". Cohen argued that it follows that rationalist pedagogies favoured by anti-racists are doomed to failure since they fail to engage with the structures of disavowal that are intrinsic to racialised structures of feeling and belief.

== Left fields: class, community and identity politics ==
In a series of articles for the journal Soundings, Cohen argued for abandoning the classic Marxist analysis of class consciousness based on the distinction between class in and for itself, and replacing it with the notion of class from and to itself, mediated by identity formations centred on multitude or tribe. These imagined communities of citizens have become important actors outside and sometimes against the formal apparatus of political representation, posing a direct challenge to Social Democracy. The rise of communitarianism and populism is analysed from this standpoint and a political actor network theory proposed as a way of mapping this more fluid space of ideological affiliations and affinities. These ideas were developed further in a study examining the political culture of the British Left following the historic defeat of the Labour Party in 2019. This resulted in two pamphlets published by the think tank Compass.

== East London ==
Over a 40-year period, some twenty projects were carried out in different parts of East London, including the Isle of Dogs, Whitechapel, The Royal Docks, Stratford and Barking. The projects varied in scope and scale from a major comparative research project funded by the ESRC, to small-scale community initiatives, and including local school and neighbourhood based ethnographies as well as photography, video and other visual arts projects (see also Filmography section below). A further study into the cultural politics of regeneration appeared in Regeneration Songs.

Although not a longitudinal study in the strict sense, this long series of projects and related publications set out to capture the impact of complex structural change on the livelihoods, life styles and life stories of successive generations of young East Enders and their parents. The empirical focus was on the processes de-industrialisation, globalisation and the advent of neoliberal policies in the local housing and labour markets. Much of this work was brought together in the first part of Cohen's book about the impact of the 2012 Olympics on East London.

== Intellectuals, dialogic research and the dissident academy ==
Cohen's intellectual and political formation took place outside the academy. He did not have a first degree and he obtained a PhD by publication. He spent five years in the British Museum Reading Room following a course of independent study, and observing how some of his early ideas were taken up by academics and exploited for their own career advancement. As a result, he was always opposed to extractive forms of social research, and suspicious of the ways in which academics make intellectual capital out of the information supplied to them. Instead, he experimented with alternative, non-academic ways of co-producing and disseminating research knowledge through exhibitions, films, comics and the visual arts. He wrote on the curriculum of the Multicultural University, the historical relationship between Black and Jewish intellectuals, the limits and conditions of dialogic/participatory research, citizen social science and the critical pedagogy of anti-racism. The extent to which it is possible to sustain a culture of critical enquiry and dissent within the neo-liberal university, and in the face of toxic forms of student identity politics is considered in further studies.

== Journalism ==
Cohen wrote for numerous left-wing journals, including New Socialist, Marxism Today, Soundings and New Formations. He also contributed to the online OpenDemocracy platform. From 2012, he wrote a regular blog on his website on a range of topics in contemporary politics and culture. A collection of this material was published in 2019.

== Creative writing: poetry and prose ==
Cohen began writing poetry after attending a course at the Poetry School. His poems have been published in Soundings, agenda, Critical Quarterly, Metaphorica and Quartos. A collection of his poetry and prose was published in Graphologies, in partnership with Jean McNeil, by Mica Press in 2013. A narrative prose poem Postcards to Grandad was published in 2019.
. "Things Ain't What they Used to be: Notebooks from a once and future time" is an experimental image/text, produced in collaboration with four graphic artists, which explores the post pandemic zeitgeist; it was published by eyeglass books in the spring of 2023.

He had been working on a graphic novel with the American illustrator Maureen Burdock. Too Near, the Bridge.Too Far, a rewriting of "Three Billy Goats Gruff" as a political fable for adults about the environmental crisis, was scheduled for publication in 2024.

== Filmography ==
- The Way We Were Then (Fragment Films 2001): A television documentary about the "hippy squat" at 144 Piccadilly, featuring an interview with "Dr John".
- Tricks of the Trade (Art of Change/UEL Media Dept 1992): Made as part of an anti-racist education project with primary schools in East London and funded by the Hilden Trust. It presents the materials and includes an interview with Stuart Hall. Designed to accompany Anansi meets Spiderwoman (BFI Education 1997).
- Empires of the Mind; (Open University Film Unit 1997) This film was made to accompany the Open University Course on "Race, Culture and Society" and explores the popular imagery of race, nation and empire that was in circulation in the Victorian school. It is introduced by Ali Rattansi.
- It Ain't Our Place Any More: Young People’s Views of Regeneration in East London (Fundamental Architecture 2007): North Woolwich is part of the Royal Docks but is physically isolated by virtue of its physical geography and for many years was subject to neglect by planners and politicians alike. It has a large concentration of social housing and has been home to a large, and increasingly ethnically diverse working-class community. In this video, young people for the area voices their hopes and fears for the future of the area, and consider the likely impact of regeneration and the Olympics.
- Speaking Out of Place: Voices from East London’s Olympic Legacy (Aura Productions/LLDC/Livingmaps Network 2016): This film is the product of a collaboration with residents and young people in East 20. It was made as part of a larger project investigating the impact of the 2012 Olympic Legacy on local communities. The film is composed of five short segments, each examining a different aspect of the Olympic Legacy. The aim was to sample a range of local voices and opinions, and to raise wider issues about mega-event regeneration, in terms of sustainable employment, affordable housing, community development, public amenity, policing and youth participation.
- Front Lines, Back Yards (ULIE Media Department 1988): This video presents highlights of a conference in 1987, with contributions from the main speakers including Stuart Hall, Paul Gilroy and Phil Cohen. There are interviews with delegates, and presentations from some of the poets and artists who took part.
- Playgrounds of Prejudice (GLC/UEL Media Productions 1985): A study of playground culture in a Dockland school, featuring a multi-perspective analysis of a fight between an Irish and Black boy. The film was made as part of the "No Kidding" project funded by the GLC (1982–84).
- Methods in Dialogue (ESRC/UEL Media Productions 2004): A conversation between Mike Rustin and Phil Cohen exploring the methodologies of a comparative study of class, ethnicity and gender identities amongst young people in two areas of London's docklands and two areas of Hamburg. The project was carried out in collaboration with Nora Rathzel, and funded by the ESRC and the Volkswagen Foundation.
- Rethinking '1968' (Aura Productions 2018): A compilation of contributions to a conference organised as a Festschrift and to reflect on the legacy of "1968". Includes plenary contributions from Phil Cohen, Lynne Segal, Jeremy Gilbert and Mike Rustin.
- Lights on for the Territory (Aura Productions/Livingmaps Network 2017): A film exploring the creative and technical processes involved in making a narrative map, focusing on a map made by John Wallett.
- Citizens Atlas of London (Aura Productions/Livingmaps Network 2019): A film exploring the London Plan and its impact on communities living in its designated "opportunity areas", featuring contributions from Phil Cohen, Michael Edwards and Anna Minton, and the map work of Barbara Brayshay, Debbie Kent and Jina Lee.
