= Battle of the Beanfield =

1985 conflict near Stonehenge, UK

- Part of Police brutality in the United Kingdom
- Police and Travellers at the Battle of the Beanfield.
- Date: 1 June 1985
- Location: Wiltshire, England; 51.1937°N 1.667°W
- Caused by: High Court injunction prohibiting the Stonehenge Free Festival. Large convoy of New Age Travellers travelled to Stonehenge and were met with an even larger police operation who had the claimed intent of enforcing the injunction.
- Result: The 1985 festival was prevented from taking place amid violent, controversial and disputed events.

Parties
The Peace Convoy	Wiltshire Police

Number
600	1,300

Casualties and losses
Hospitalised: 16 travellers Arrested: 537	Hospitalised: 8 police officers

The Battle of the Beanfield took place over several hours on 1 June 1985, when Wiltshire Police prevented The Peace Convoy, a convoy of several hundred New Age travellers, from setting up the 1985 Stonehenge Free Festival in Wiltshire, England. The police were enforcing a High Court injunction obtained by the authorities prohibiting the 1985 festival from taking place. Around 1,300 police officers took part in the operation against approximately 600 travellers.

The convoy of travellers heading for Stonehenge encountered a police road block seven miles from the landmark. Police claimed that some traveller vehicles then rammed police vehicles in an attempt to push through the roadblock. Around the same time police smashed the windows of some of the convoy's vehicles and some travellers were arrested. The rest broke into an adjacent field, and a stand-off developed that persisted for several hours. According to the BBC, "Police said they came under attack, being pelted with lumps of wood, stones and even petrol bombs". Conversely, The Observer states the travellers were not armed with petrol bombs and that police intelligence suggesting so "was false".

Eventually the police launched another attack during which the worst of the violent police behaviour took place. According to The Observer, during this period pregnant women and those holding babies were clubbed by police with truncheons and the police were hitting "anybody they could reach". When some of the travellers tried to escape by driving away through the fields, The Observer stated that the police threw truncheons, shields, fire extinguishers and stones at them to try to stop them.

Dozens of travellers were injured, and 537 travellers were eventually arrested. This represents one of the largest mass arrests of civilians since at least the Second World War, possibly one of the biggest in English legal history.

Two years after the event, a Wiltshire police sergeant was found guilty of actual bodily harm as a consequence of injuries incurred by a member of the convoy during the Battle of the Beanfield.

In February 1991 a civil court judgement awarded 21 of the travellers £24,000 in damages for false imprisonment, damage to property and wrongful arrest. The award was swallowed by their legal bill as the judge did not award them legal costs.

== Background ==
The British New Age Travellers movement developed in the 1970s with the intended purpose of attempting to create an alternative way of life. Travellers maintained themselves partly by travelling between, organising and trading at free festivals. After a stay with Campaign for Nuclear Disarmament demonstrators, one group of travellers came to be known as The Peace Convoy.

Convoy vehicles preparing to leave Long Marston airfield, 31 May 1985, en route to the Stonehenge Free Festival.

The free festival scene thus also emerged in the 1970s. The People's Free Festival at Windsor ran from 1972 until 1974 when it was violently terminated by the authorities. Stonehenge Free Festival began in 1974. In 1975 the Windsor festival switched to Watchfield but did not prove successful at the abandoned military site. Consequently, The People's Free Festival at Stonehenge became the focal point of the movement. In 1980, the Festival was marred by significant violence, largely by biker groups.

In 1984 the Department of the Environment passed management of Stonehenge and the surrounding land to English Heritage. By that time the festival had grown in size, the attendance figure for the 1984 festival was estimated at 100,000. Due to the high attendance figures there was little authority present at Stonehenge festivals and the police were unable to shut them down or implement the law. Consequently, most illegal drugs were unrestrictedly available and advertised for purchase. Traders at the festival were neglecting to obtain licences or pay taxes.

Critics claimed that the 1984 festival had resulted in the destruction of archaeological information and on the site itself, "holes had been dug in Bronze Age barrows for latrines and as bread ovens, motorcycles had been ridden over them, churning the surface. Fences had been torn down, and a thousand young trees cut down for firewood". The clean-up cost upwards of £20,000, besides the archaeological information that was lost. Landowners also claimed that damage to Stonehenge, other property damage, trespassing, recreational drug use and bathing naked in rivers had occurred during the festival.

A civil high court injunction was consequently imposed prohibiting the proposed 1985 festival from taking place.

== Main events ==
After staying the previous night in Savernake Forest, the Convoy on the morning of 1 June numbered up to 140 vehicles, most of them buses and vans converted into living spaces; it is estimated they contained 600 people. The police had laid down an exclusion zone 4 miles (6.4 km) around the perimeter of Stonehenge, which the convoy hoped to breach. The Convoy met resistance when the police set up a roadblock near Shipton Bellinger about 7 miles (11 km) from Stonehenge. This was achieved by tipping three lorry loads of gravel across the road. According to The Observer, the convoy evaded the main roadblock on the A303 by slipping down a side road but were then met with a second roadblock. At this juncture the police claim that some traveller vehicles rammed police vehicles in an attempt to escape the roadblock. At around the same time the police smashed the windscreens of traveller vehicles and arrested occupants.

Most traveller vehicles broke into an adjacent field, by driving through a hedgerow according to one source. A stand-off consequently ensued. Travellers made attempts to negotiate with police but the officer in charge, Assistant Chief Constable Lionel Grundy, ordered that all travellers be arrested. There were outbreaks of violence during which several members of the Convoy received head injuries. An ambulance was allowed through to take them to hospital. Police Officer Bernie Lund, who was on scene, claimed that during the stand-off, petrol bombs and sticks were thrown at officers. However The Guardian states that travellers were not armed with petrol bombs and that police intelligence suggesting that they were "was false".

At 7pm officers in riot gear entered the field and launched a final attack. Pregnant women and those holding babies were hit by police with truncheons according to The Observer, who also noted journalist Nick Davies stating that police were hitting "anybody (that) they could reach". When some travellers tried to escape by driving away through the field police allegedly threw truncheons, shields, fire-extinguishers and stones at them to stop them.

One of the travellers, Phil Shakesby (also known as Phil the Beer), said of these events, "About two thirds of the vehicles actually started moving and took off and raced into the adjacent field which was full of beans, we raced into the beanfield. We were charging around and around and of course, as the minutes went by, there were less and less of us, and people were stopping, their homes were systematically being broken. The people were being battered and taken away and flung into riot wagons." Shakesby went on to say, "Up on the brow of the hill where they were taking this lot that were left. These bobbies stopped me, forced me, spun me around and made me look, see that and I looked at my home, there was smoke coming out of the side doors of the truck. They had gone and set my home on fire." The Observer and The Independent report that travellers' vehicles were smashed and set on fire. One traveller was taken away with a suspected fractured skull.

Kim Sabido an ITN reporter said in a later interview recalling the events of the day. "The way that the police behaved in the final stages of the beanfield, and how they confronted people and their property was, I think, probably one of the biggest shocks of my life. More shocking than any deaths I've seen in a war zone. It was almost like a scene from (the film) Zulu where you had a whole line of policemen banging their shields, progressively moving up the field smashing any vehicle or anybody in their way." Sabido recounted in his interview that he witnessed the final assault lasting for about "half an hour".

The large majority of the travellers, over 500, were arrested on suspicion of obstructing police and obstructing the highway. One source states that this represented the largest mass arrest of civilians in English legal history, another that it was the biggest figure since the Second World War. There were insufficient holding cells in local jails to hold all those arrested. Convoy members were transported throughout the Midlands and even to northern England. Not all children and parents ended up in the same region. Most of the arrests did not result in successful prosecutions.

Traveller Alan Lodge, speaking to the BBC, described it as "an ambush that happened on a small, mild mannered bunch of people".

The UK miners' strike had ended earlier in the same year, and police compared this event with tactics used at the Battle of the Beanfield, stating: "The Police operation had been planned for several months and lessons in rapid deployment learned from the miners' strike were implemented."

== Witnesses ==
Most independent eyewitness accounts of the events relate that the police used violent tactics against men, women and children, including pregnant women; and purposely damaged the vehicles used by the convoy.

=== Earl of Cardigan ===
The travellers had departed from Savernake Forest, which is owned by the Earl of Cardigan's family. The Earl of Cardigan decided to follow the convoy on his motorbike. The Earl describes that during the initial confrontation there were negotiations with police who insisted that the travellers would not be allowed to pass. The travellers subsequently began entering into a field. Then "police rushed out on foot, from behind their barricades. Clutching drawn truncheons and riot shields, they ran round to the driver's door of each vehicle, slamming their truncheons into the bodywork to make a deafening noise, and shouting at every driver, 'get out, get out, hand over your keys, get out'". He states that police were "smashing up vehicles" and instructions to "Get out!" often happened simultaneously, giving travellers no time to react before police used riot sticks to break the vehicles' windscreens. Cardigan described seeing a very pregnant woman being "repeatedly clubbed on the head" by police, many of whom had their ID numbers covered up. He also saw police with hammers smashing up the dashboards of several of the now-abandoned motor-coach homes.

Cardigan also described how he was approached by the police the following day, who wanted permission to remove travellers who were still at Savernake: "They said they wanted to go into the campsite 'suitably equipped' and 'finish unfinished business'. Make of that phrase what you will. I said to them, that if it was my permission they were after, they did not have it. I did not want a repeat of the grotesque events that I'd seen the day before."

=== Journalists ===
ITN Reporter Kim Sabido was at the scene and recorded a piece-to-camera in which he claimed that he had witnessed "some of the most brutal police treatment of people" that he had seen in his entire career as a journalist. He also remarked on the number of people that had been "clubbed" by police including those "holding babies in their arms". He felt that an inquiry should be held into what had happened. Sabido later claimed that when he went back to the ITN library to look at the rushes, most of the footage had "disappeared, particularly some of the nastier shots." Some of this missing footage was later rediscovered and incorporated into Operation Solstice a documentary shown on Channel 4 in 1991.

Nick Davies reported for the Observer that "There was glass breaking, people screaming, black smoke towering out of burning caravans and everywhere there seemed to be people being bashed and flattened and pulled by the hair. Men, women and children were led away, shivering, swearing, crying, bleeding, leaving their homes in pieces."

Freelance photographer Ben Gibson, engaged by The Observer that day, was arrested and charged with obstructing a police officer. He was later acquitted. Another freelance photographer, Tim Malyon, had to flee at one point.

== Legal action ==
Twenty-four of the travellers sued Wiltshire Police for wrongful arrest, assault and criminal damage to themselves and their property. Six years after the event a verdict was reached: 21 of the travellers were successful in their case and were awarded £24,000 in damages towards their false imprisonment, damage to property and wrongful arrest. The judge declined to award their legal costs and their compensation consequently went towards paying for this. Their barrister, Lord Gifford QC, stated "It left a very sour taste in the mouth."

In court, individual police officers were difficult to identify, as they had hidden their identification numbers on the day. Despite this, one police sergeant was convicted of an assault occasioning actual bodily harm on a member of the Convoy.

Police radio and video was used as evidence during the court case, however there was a recording gap in both the radio and video recordings. The recording gap in the video footage was allegedly due to the video tape breaking when the convoy was initially halted at the roadblock. There was also evidence that radio logs of conversations between officers on the day of the battle had been altered.

The Earl of Cardigan testified in court against Wiltshire Police. His testimony proved vital in supporting the allegation that police violence had been excessive. He was criticised by several national newspapers for acting as a witness against Wiltshire Police; Bill Deedes's editorial in The Daily Telegraph claimed he was a class traitor. Consequently, the Earl successfully sued for defamation.

== Aftermath and legacy ==
Legislation was introduced in the form of the Public Order Act 1986 and later the Criminal Justice Act 1994 that made the travellers' way of life increasingly difficult to sustain.

Following the events of 1985, the four-mile blockade of Stonehenge was maintained for future summer solstices. Consequently, conflict between police and those trying to reach Stonehenge continued to take place every year. Neo-druid leader Arthur Uther Pendragon was arrested on each and every summer solstice between 1985 and 1999 whilst trying to access Stonehenge. In the summer of 1988 around 130 people were arrested and in 1989 that figure rose to 260.

For the 1999 summer solstice English Heritage granted "limited access" to Stonehenge to neo-druids. This access permission was later rescinded when 200 New Age travellers broke on to the site. Twenty people were arrested.

Despite repeated calls, an inquiry into the events of 1 June 1985 has never been carried out.

In July 2025 entrepreneur Dale Vince, who had been present at the event, called for the forthcoming enquiry into the Battle of Orgreave to be expanded to include the Battle of the Beanfield, expressing the belief that both episodes were part of a plan by Margaret Thatcher to "smash" the miners and travellers, whom she considered to be "enemies of the state".

== Cultural references ==
In the 1985 song "Stonehenge" by Poison Girls, the Battle of the Beanfield is referenced, highlighting the conflict between festival-goers and police forces.

Singer Roy Harper's song "Back to the Stones" refers to the Battle of the Beanfield. It was recorded in 1989 and appears on his 1993 live album Unhinged.

The Hawkwind song "Confrontation" from the album Out & Intake includes a description of the day's events and includes a dramatisation of some events including the repeated phrase "I am not interested in anything you have to say".

The Levellers' song "Battle of the Beanfield", from their 1991 album Levelling the Land, was inspired by the Battle of the Beanfield.

British progressive rock band Solstice wrote a song which comments on the Battle. "Circles" is found on their 1997 album of the same name, and includes what sounds like reporting from the battle, with Kim Sabido's voice-over.

The song "Itinerant Child", by Ian Dury and Chaz Jankel, which appears on the 1998 album Mr. Love Pants, by Ian Dury & The Blockheads, was inspired by Dury's experiences during the incident.

The police riot is a feature of the 2001 novel He Kills Coppers by Jake Arnott, partially following changes in police culture between the 1960s and the 1980s, later made into an ITV TV series.

In 2009, the English-based street artist and political activist Banksy produced a large 2.5m x 3m 'Battle of the Beanfield' painting.

The confrontation is also featured in the 2018 novel The Fountain in the Forest by Tony White. A first-hand account of the incident is described by Dale Vince in his 2020 book 'Manifesto'.

In 2025, on the 40th anniversary of the confrontation. A surviving bus containing a small exhibition about the events of the time was displayed at the Glastonbury Festival.

== The site today ==
Although associated with Wiltshire, the confrontation actually took place just over the county boundary in Hampshire. The field is located east of the A338 Parkhouse roundabout which is just south of the main A303 (A338) junction. The memorial plaque lies about 100m to the east of roundabout on the northern side of B3084.

In 1985, the B3084 (Thruxton Road) was part of the A303. This was bypassed in 1988 when the A303 was rebuilt as dual carriageway slightly to the north. This cut across the upper reaches of the beanfield site. A new line of trees was also planted at this time to screen the new road’s presence. The site is therefore different today than it was in the mid-1980s.

As part of these changes, the original upper section of the B3084 (which is where the convoy turned down from the A338 hoping to avoid the initial roadblock) was severed and stopped up at each end due to the A303 rebuild. All that survives is a short no through road which provides access to the adjacent properties and field. To the north of the A303, the remains of the B3084 provides access to a solar farm. Despite these changes, the lower grass field and some of the land where the beanfield once grew remain.

== See also ==
- Glastonbury Festival
- Summer Solstice at Stonehenge
- Battle of Orgreave
