= The Wallies of Wessex =

The Wallies of Wessex were a group of people who squatted on ground close to Stonehenge in 1974. The Department of the Environment and the National Trust landowners started court proceedings to have the squatters evicted. The squatters, both to make a counter culture point and to protect themselves from court costs, all used aliases in court that included the name Wally. They lost the case and had to move a few feet to an alternative site, but the case was reported in the national press.

The Wallies were involved in the organisation of the 1976 Trentishoe Whole Earth Fair.

== Aftermath ==
Nigel Ayers states that, largely through later publications by Penny Rimbaud of the punk band Crass, the name 'Wally' became increasingly identified with one man, Wally Hope aka Phil Russell, who had written and published much of the promotional material for the 1974 Stonehenge festival.
