= Stonehenge Free Festival =

1974–1984 UK music festival

Coordinates: 51°10′44″N 1°49′34″W

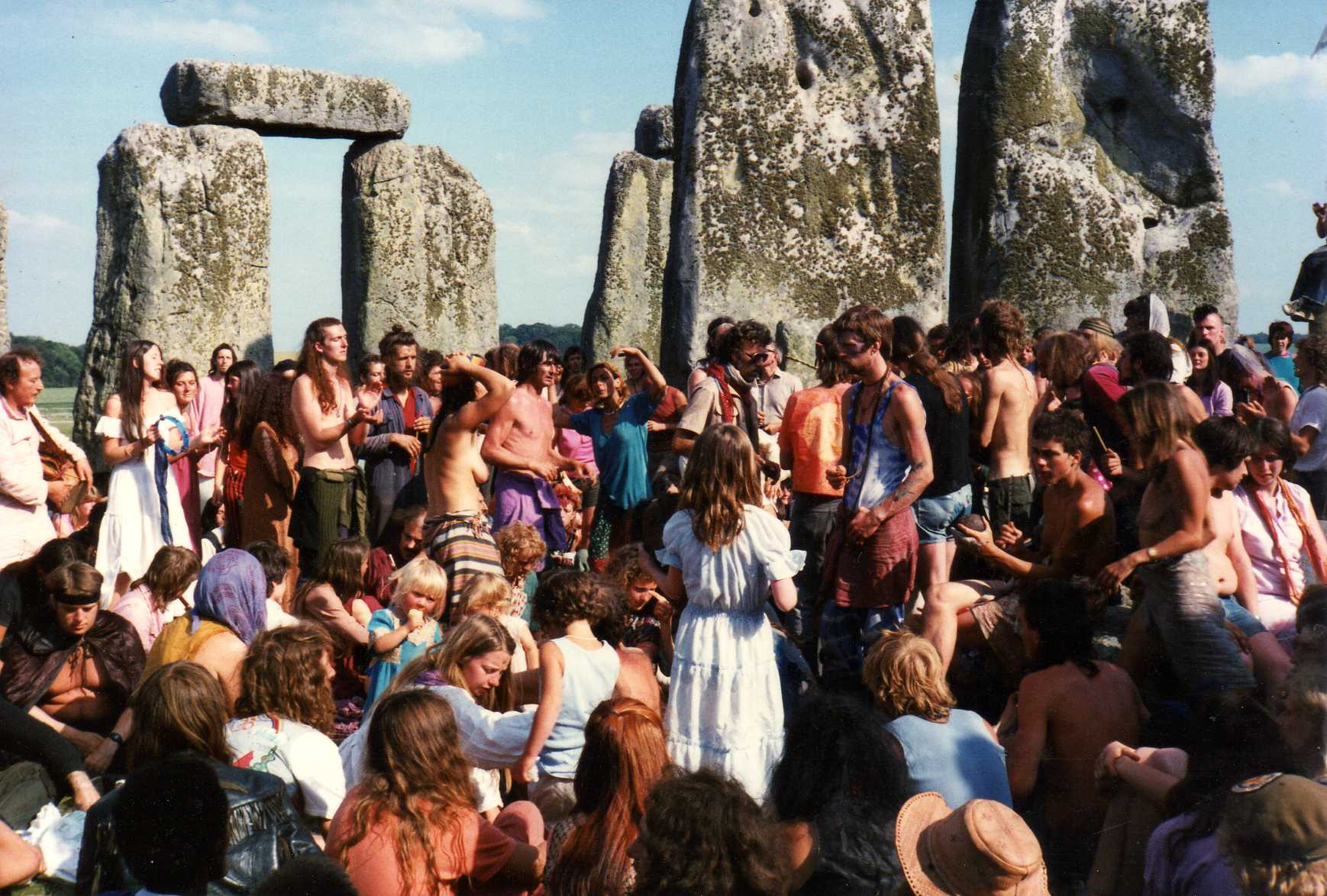
- Genre: Rock music
- Dates: month of June – 21 June
- Location: Stonehenge in England
- Years active: 1974 to 1984

The Stonehenge Free Festival was a British free festival from 1974 to 1984 held at the prehistoric monument Stonehenge in England during the month of June, and culminating with the summer solstice on or near 21 June. It emerged as the major free festival in the calendar after the violent suppression of the Windsor Free Festival in August 1974, with Wally Hope providing the impetus for its founding. By the 1980s, the festival had grown to be a major event, attracting up to 30,000 people in 1984. The festival attendees were branded as hippies by the British press. This, along with the open drug use and sale, contributed to the increase in restrictions on access to Stonehenge, and fences were erected around the stones in 1977. The same year, police resurrected a moribund law against driving over grassland in order to levy fines against festival goers in motorised transport. The festival came to an end in 1985 following the infamous Battle of the Beanfield. What followed was several years of exclusion until the year 2000 when full access was restored.

== Bands ==
The festival was a celebration of various alternative cultures. The Tibetan Ukrainian Mountain Troupe, The Tepee People, Circus Normal, the Peace Convoy, New Age Travellers and the Wallys were notable counterculture attendees.

The stage hosted many bands including Hawkwind, Zorch, Poison Girls, Doctor and the Medics, Flux of Pink Indians, Buster Blood Vessel, Omega Tribe, Killing Joke, The Selecter, Dexys Midnight Runners, Thompson Twins, Bronz, The Raincoats, The 101ers, Jeremy Spencer & the Children of God, Brent Black Music Co-op, Killerhertz, Mournblade, Amazulu, Wishbone Ash, Man, Benjamin Zephaniah, Inner City Unit, Here and Now, Cardiacs, The Enid, Roy Harper, Jimmy Page, Ted Chippington, Ozric Tentacles, Solstice and Vince Pie and the Crumbs, who all played for free.

== See also ==
- List of historic rock festivals
- List of jam band music festivals
- Phil Russell, aka Wally Hope, co-founder of the Stonehenge and Windsor free festivals.
- Council of British Druid Orders

== Bibliography ==
- McKay, George (1996) Senseless Acts of Beauty: Cultures of Resistance since the Sixties: chapter one "The free festivals and fairs of Albion", chapter two "O life unlike to ours! Go for it! New Age travellers". London: Verso Books. ISBN 1-85984-028-0.
