= Windsor Free Festival =

1972–1974 British free festival

- Frequency: annually
- Locations: Windsor Great Park, England
- Years active: 1972–1974
- Organiser: London commune dwellers, notably Ubi Dwyer and Sid Rawle

The Windsor Free Festival was a British free festival held in Windsor Great Park from 1972 to 1974. Organised by some London commune dwellers, notably Ubi Dwyer and Sid Rawle, it was in many ways the forerunner of the Stonehenge Free Festival, particularly in the brutality of its final suppression by the police, which led to a public outcry about the tactics involved.

== History ==
The first Festival in 1972 was promoted as "Rent Strike: The People's Free Festival", reflecting the political concerns of the organisers (coming as they did from squatting and commune movements), with an anti-monarchist choice of site in "the Queen's back garden". Attendance was about 700 in its first year, rising to 8,000 in 1973, and an even larger crowd in its final year.

The 1974 Festival, due to last for ten days, was broken up on the sixth morning by a large number of police. Early on Wednesday 28 August 1974 the site was invaded by hundreds of officers from the Thames Valley police force with truncheons drawn, who gave the remaining participants ten minutes to leave. Those who did not were arrested or evicted with a level of force that led seven national newspapers to call for an inquiry, and Roy Jenkins, the Home Secretary, to call for a report from the Thames Valley Chief Constable. Nicholas Albery, playwright Heathcote Williams and his partner Diana Senior successfully sued David Holdsworth, the Thames Valley Chief Constable for creating a riotous situation in which the police attacked the plaintiffs.

In 1975 both Ubi Dwyer and Sid Rawle were imprisoned, for attempting to promote a 1975 Windsor Festival. A further attempt to return to Windsor in 1978 led to another arrest for Dwyer. The government provided an abandoned airfield at Watchfield in 1975, in response to the public outrage, and as a means of moving the festival away from royal castles.

== See also ==
- List of historic rock festivals
- List of free festivals
- Phil Russell, aka Wally Hope, co-founder of the Windsor and the Stonehenge Free Festivals.
