= New Age travellers =

Category of people in the UK living alternative lifestyles

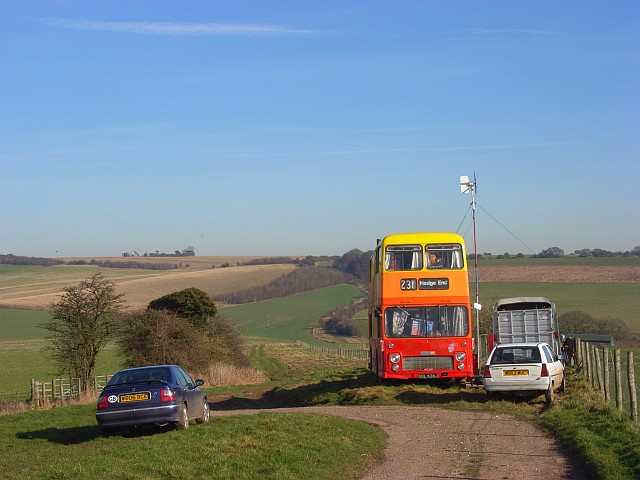
- Vehicles used by New Age travellers

Regions with significant populations
- United Kingdom

Religions
- New Age

New Age Travellers (synonymous with and otherwise known as New Travellers) are people located primarily in the United Kingdom generally espousing New Age beliefs with hippie or Bohemian culture of the 1960s. New Age Travellers used to travel between free music festivals and fairs prior to a crackdown in the 1990s. New Traveller also refers to those who are not traditionally of an ethnic nomadic group but who have chosen to pursue a nomadic lifestyle.

A New Traveller's transport and home may consist of living in a van, vardo, lorry, bus, car or caravan converted into a mobile home while also making use of an improvised bender tent, tipi or yurt. Some New Travellers and New Nomads may stay in guest bedrooms of hosts, or pay for inexpensive affordable lodgings while living in different locations around the world as part of their New Traveller lifestyle.

"New Age" travellers largely originated in 1980s and early 1990s Britain, when they were known pejoratively as crusties because of the association with "encrusted dirt, dirt as a deliberate embrace of grotesquerie, a statement of resistance against society, proof of nomadic hardship."

== History ==
=== Origins ===
The movement originated in the free festivals of the 1960s and 1970s such as the Windsor Free Festival, the early Glastonbury Festivals, Elephant Fayres, and the huge Stonehenge Free Festivals in Great Britain. However, there were longstanding precedents for travelling cultures in Great Britain, including travelling pilgrims, itinerant journeymen and traders, as well as Irish Travellers, Romani groups and others.

=== Peace convoy ===
In the UK during the 1980s the travellers' mobile homes—generally old vans, trucks and buses (including double-deckers)—moved in convoys. One group of travellers came to be known as the Peace Convoy after visits to peace camps associated with the Campaign for Nuclear Disarmament (CND). The movement had faced significant opposition from the British government and from mainstream media, epitomised by the authorities' attempts to prevent the Stonehenge Free Festival, and the resultant Battle of the Beanfield in 1985—resulting in what was, according to The Guardian, one of the largest mass arrests of civilians since at least the Second World War, possibly one of the biggest in English legal history.

=== Castlemorton Common Festival ===
The Castlemorton Common Festival was a week-long free festival and rave held in the Malvern Hills between 22 and 29 May 1992. The media interest and controversy surrounding the festival, and concerns as to the way it was policed, inspired the legislation that would eventually become the Criminal Justice and Public Order Act 1994.

== See also ==
- Crust punk
- Gutter punk

== Further reading and external links ==
- O'Brien, Mark and Ashford, Chris. "'Tribal Groups' in Modern Britain: Legal Theory, Legal Practice and Human Rights" [2002/3] Contemporary Issues in Law Vol 6, Issue 2 180–206
- Gardner, Peter. "Medieval Brigands, Pictures in a Year of the Hippy Convoy" Published 1987 by Redcliffe, Bristol. ISBN 0-948265-02-7
- Colville, Fergus. Timeshift: New Age Travellers BBC Four, August 2005
- Lodge Alan, A gallery of New Age Traveller images, mostly from the 80s and 90s Retrieved 2008-11-04
- Sharkey's Busbarn, Gypsy Faire "Many of these images [from New Zealand] come courtesy of Chris Fay, previous editor and publisher of Roadhome NZ, a now-ceased publication for road folk."
- Staff, BBC 2003, Inside Out, BBC, 20 January 2003, "After being forced to camp illegally for years, Brighton Council are the first to introduce a legal site for New Age Travellers".
- Worthington, Andy (Jun 2005) The Battle of the Beanfield, Enabler Publications and Training Services, ISBN 0-9523316-6-7, ISBN 978-0-9523316-6-7
- Worthington, Andy (June 2004). Stonehenge: Celebration and Subversion, Alternative Albion, ISBN 1-872883-76-1, ISBN 978-1-872883-76-2
- UK Hippy and Tribal Living counter-culture community websites.
- A Different Light Youthful travelers in contemporary America: An interview
- Zwissler, Laurel (2011). "Pagan Pilgrimage: New Religious Movements Research on Sacred Travel within Pagan and New Age Communities". Religion Compass. 5 (7). Wiley: 326–342. doi:10.1111/j.1749-8171.2011.00282.x. ISSN 1749-8171.
