= Free festival =

Festivals without centralised control

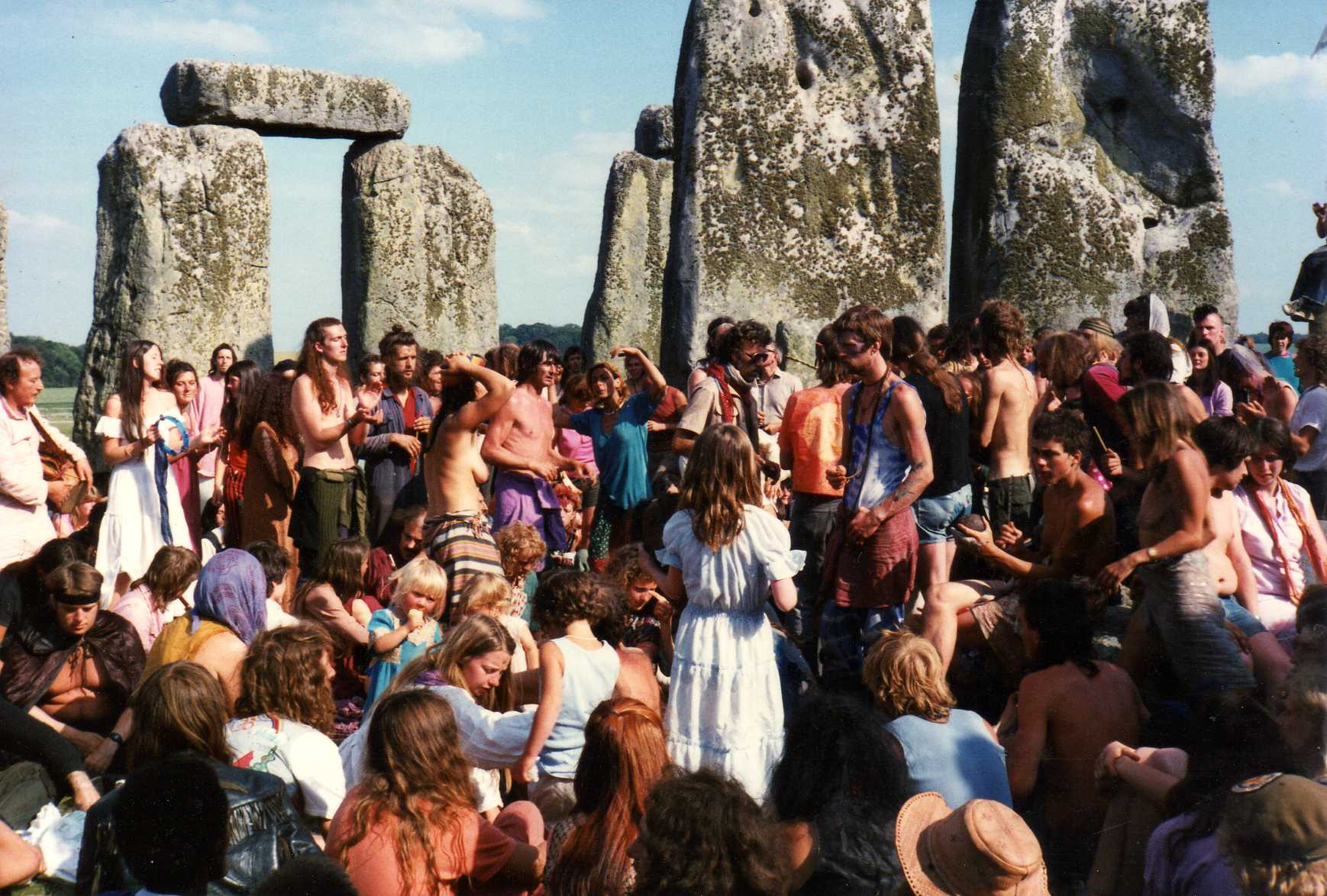
- Stonehenge Free Festival 1984

General Information
- Related genres: Rock (electronic rock, punk rock, psychedelic rock), country music, jam band music, metal music, folk music
- Location: Worldwide
- Related events: Music festival, rock festival, teknival, technoparade, rave, jam band festival, heavy metal festival, punk rock festival, reggae festival, Christian music festival, concert tour, rock concert

Free festivals are a combination of music, arts, and cultural activities, for which often no admission is charged, but involvement is preferred. They are identifiable by being multi-day events connected by a camping community without centralised control. The pioneering free festival movement started in the UK in the 1970s.

== History ==
David Bowie's song "Memory of a Free Festival", recorded in September 1969 and included on the 1969 album David Bowie, mentions the free festival organised by the Beckenham Arts Lab and held on the Croydon Road Recreation Ground on 16 August 1969. He may also have been inspired by an earlier free festival he had recently performed at, one which could lay claim to being the first of its kind in Europe.

Cambridge Midsummer Pop Festival ran from 8-11 June, 1969, offering a heavyweight line-up of psych pop, rock, folk and prog music. As well as Bowie himself (mistakenly given the first name ‘Dave’), the programme listed bands and performers such as King Crimson, Edgar Broughton, Mighty Baby, Roy Harper, Terry Reid, Brian Auger & The Trinity, Family, Strawbs and Marsha Hunt, with John Peel as MC.

The 1972 to 1974 Windsor Free Festival, held in Windsor Great Park, England, was a free festival. The 'organisation' was mostly Ubi Dwyer distributing thousands of leaflets and asking people and bands to bring their own equipment and create their own environment – "bring what you expect to find."

"Free festivals are practical demonstrations of what society could be like all the time: miniature utopias of joy and communal awareness rising for a few days from a grey morass of mundane, inhibited, paranoid and repressive everyday existence…The most lively [young people] escape geographically and physically to the ‘Never Never Land’ of a free festival where they become citizens, indeed rulers, in a new reality." Un-authored leaflet from 1980, quoted in George McKay's Senseless Acts of Beauty: Cultures of Resistance Since the Sixties (p. 15).

== Free festivals by year ==
=== Historical ===
==== 1960s ====
- Cambridge Midsummer Pop Festival, June 8-11 1969
- Woodstock Festival, 1969 (partly free)
- Croydon Road Recreation Ground free festival, 1969

==== 1970s ====
- Phun City 1970
- Glastonbury Free Festival 1971
- Windsor Free Festival, 1972–1974
  - People's Free Festivals at Watchfield 1975, Seasalter 1976 and Caesar's Camp 1978
- Trentishoe Whole Earth Fayre 1973–76
- Stonehenge Free Festival, 1972–1984
  - Battle of the Beanfield (1985)
- Rivington Pike/North Country Fair 1976–78
- Deeply Vale Festivals 1976–79
- Leamington Spa Peace Festival

==== 1980s ====
- Elephant Fayre, 1981–86
- Jazz at the Lake: Lake George Jazz Weekend (started as a free festival in upstate New York in 1984)

==== 1990s ====
- Torpedo Town - Hampshire, UK
- Castlemorton Common Festival, 1992
- Free Edinburgh Fringe Festival
- Free Fringe
- CzechTek
- Dragon Festival, Orgiva, Spain, 1997–2009
- Przystanek Woodstock
- Davestock - Vancouver Island, BC
- Heineken Music Festivals, 1990–1995, UK

==== 2000s ====
- Barışarock, 2003-2008

==== 2010s ====
- Mile of Music - Appleton, Wisconsin
- Green World Yoga & Sacred Music Festival, Skåne

==== 2020s ====
- Wisbech Rock Festival - Wisbech, Isle of Ely, UK.

== Gallery ==
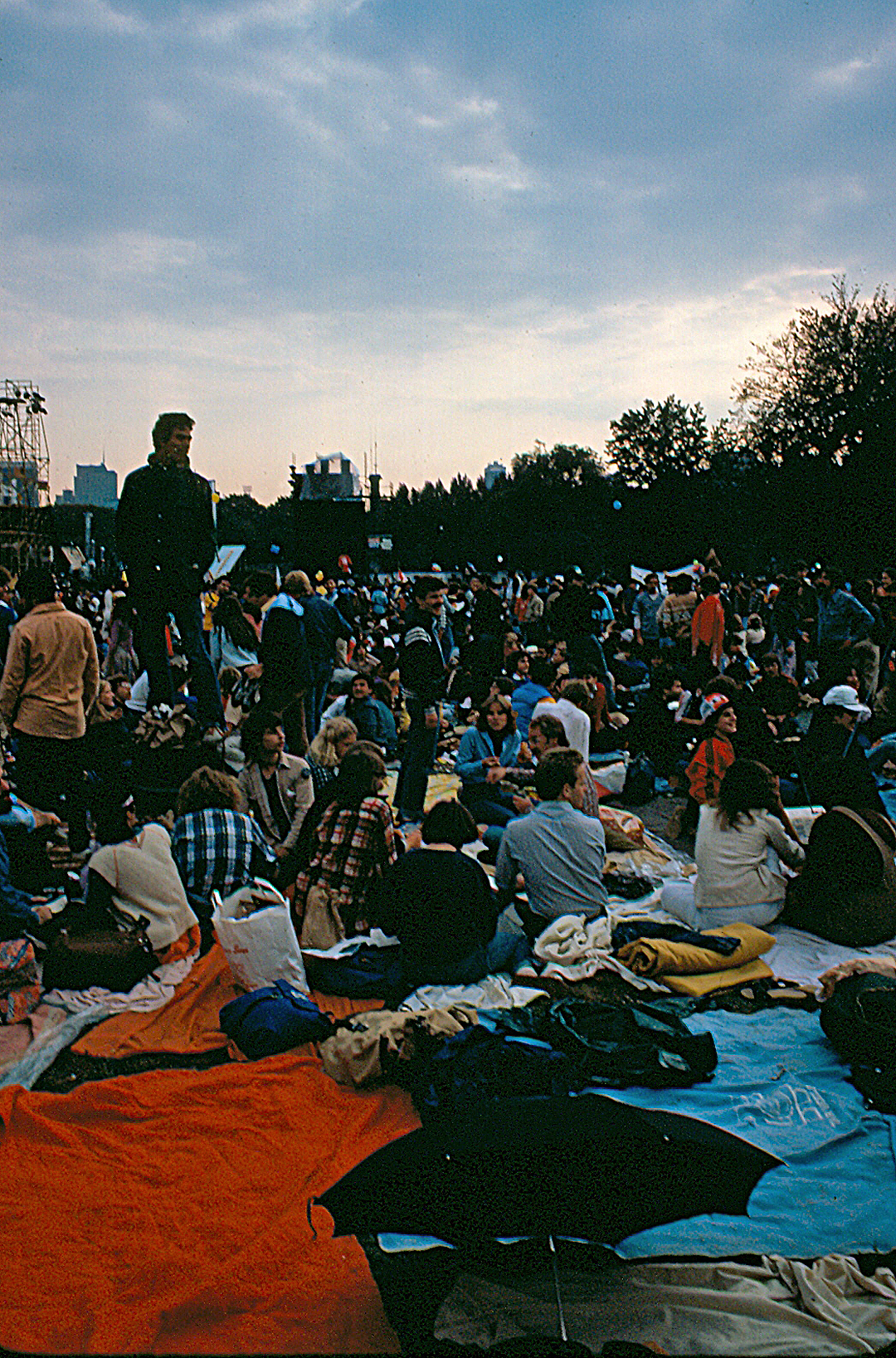
Simon and Garfunkel at The Concert in Central Park

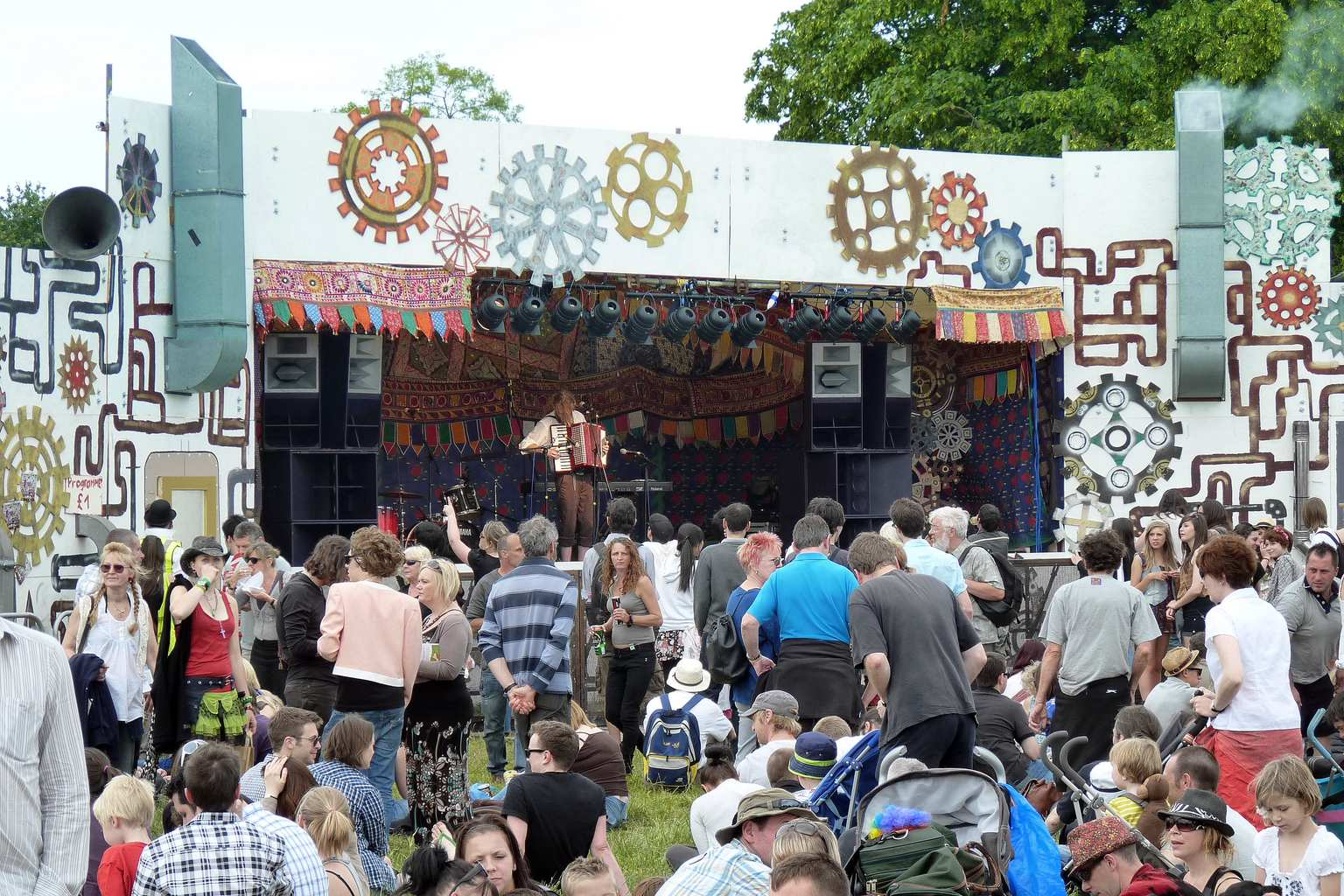
Cambridge Strawberry Fair 2011

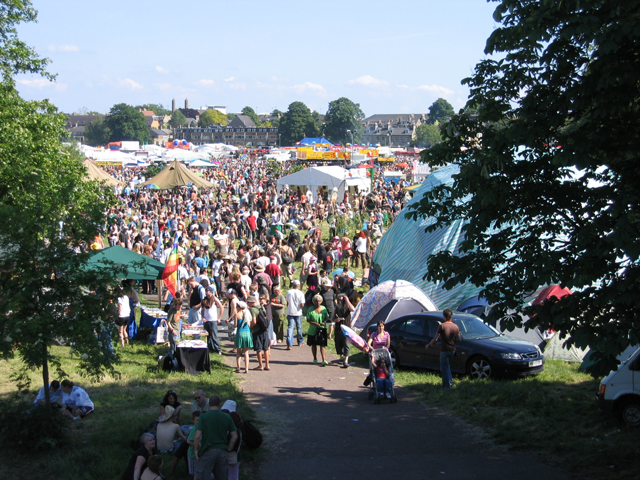
Strawberry Fair 2007, Cambridge

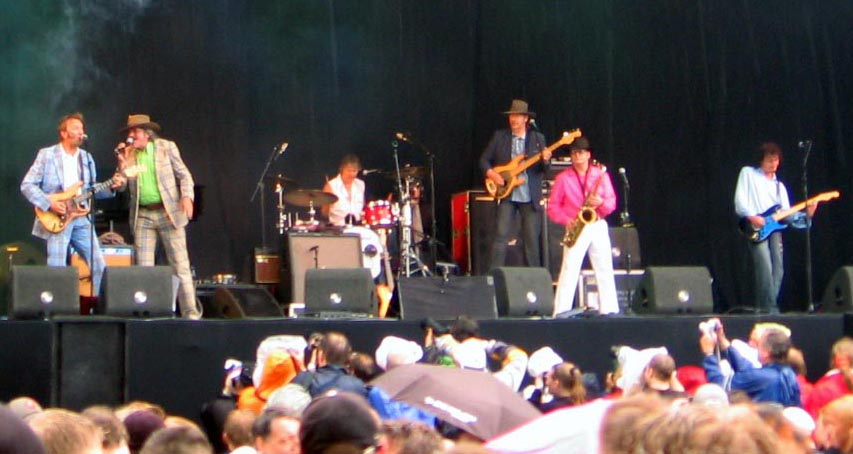
Parkpop 2006

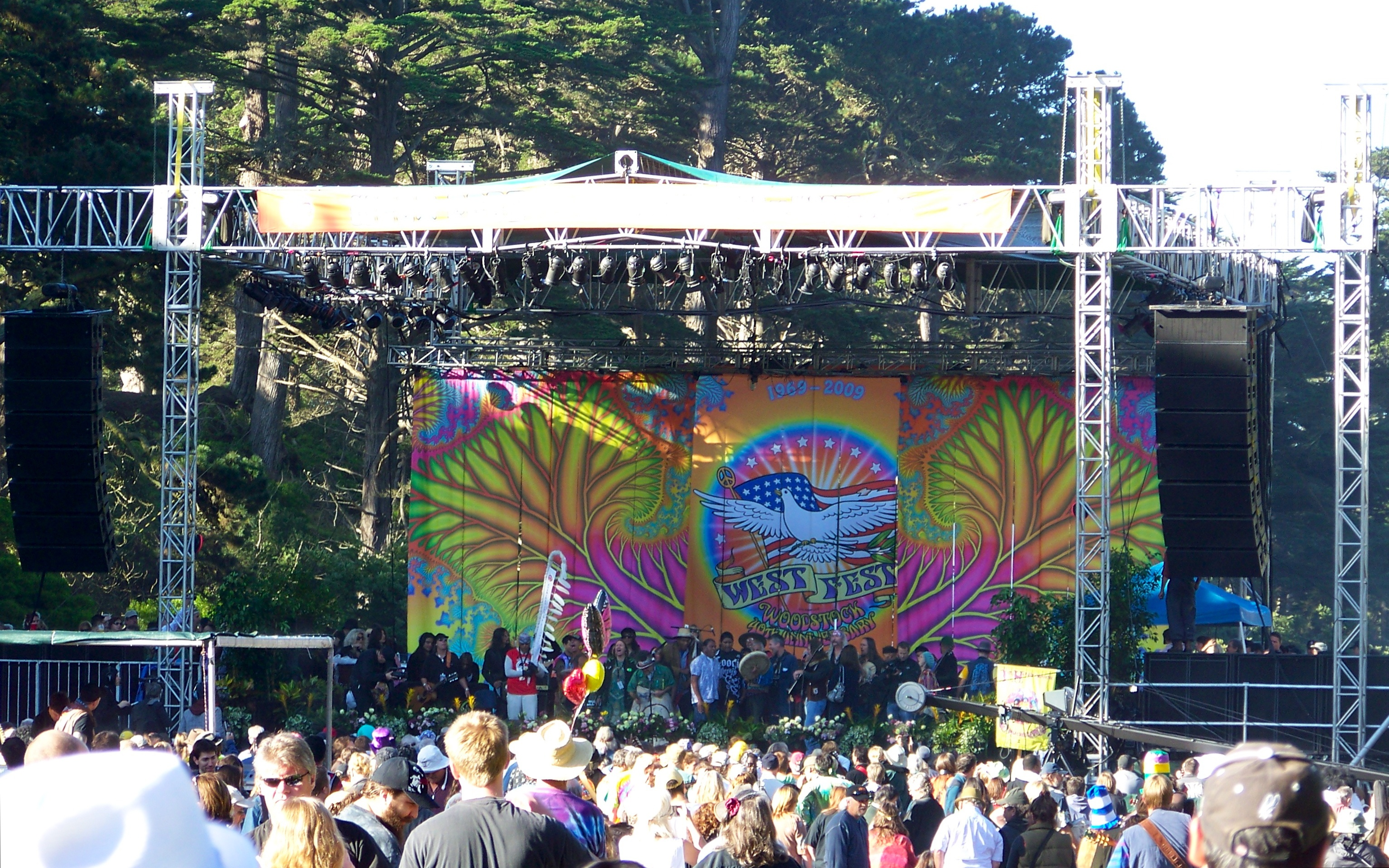
West Fest in San Francisco

== See also ==
- Free party
- New age travellers
- Alternative society
- Teknival
- DIY culture
