= Dorinish =

Island in County Mayo, Ireland

Native name: Deoirinis
- Location within island of Ireland

Geography
- Location: Atlantic Ocean (Clew Bay)
- Coordinates: 53°48′44.68″N 9°40′17.65″W
- Area: 19.74 acres (7.99 ha)

Administration
- Ireland
- Province: Connacht
- County: Mayo

Demographics
- Population: 0

Dorinish (Irish: Deoirinis) is an uninhabited island in Clew Bay in County Mayo, Ireland. During the 1970s it was briefly inhabited by hippies who established a commune there under the patronage of the island's then owner John Lennon.

== History ==
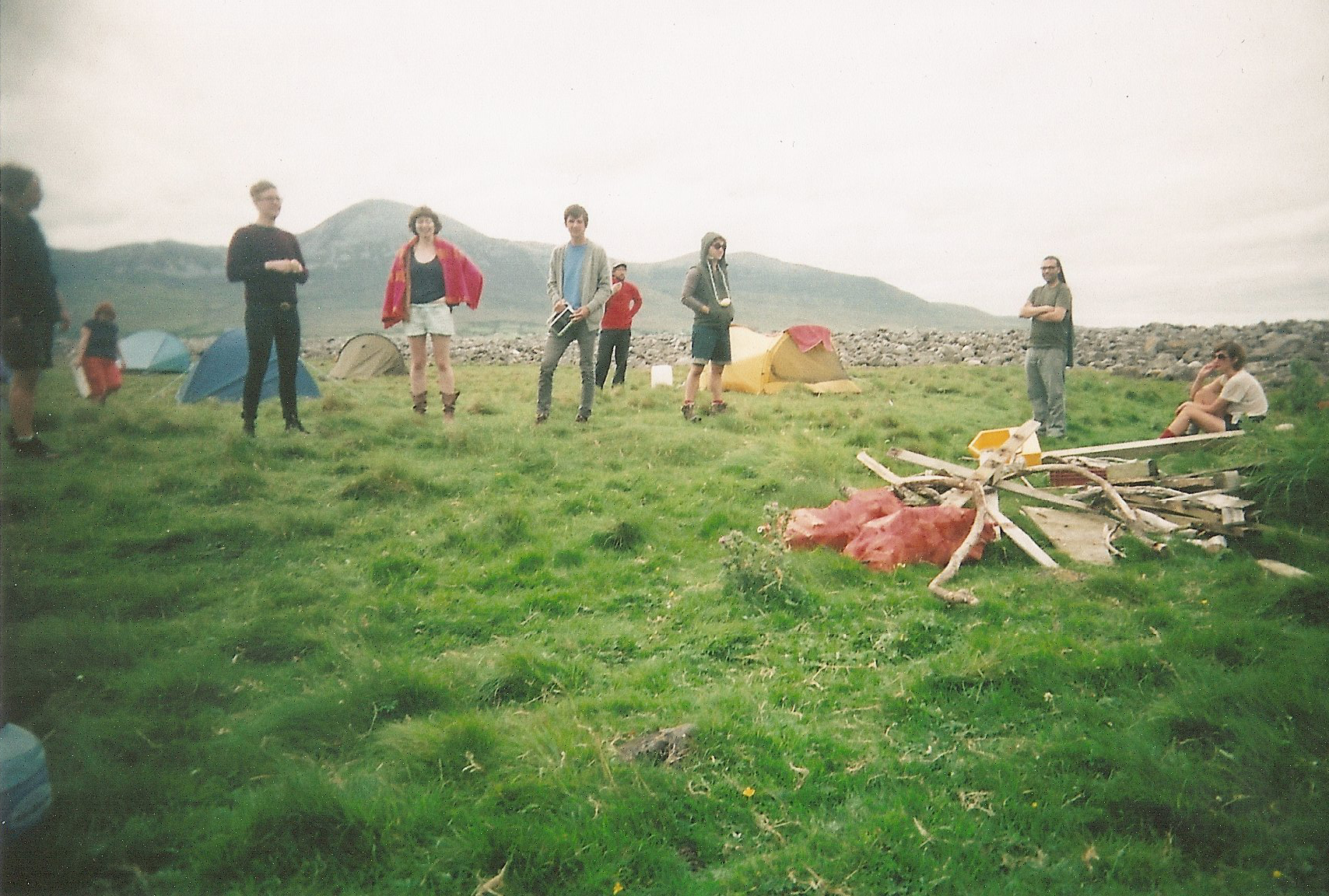
Artists on Dorinish island, summer 2011

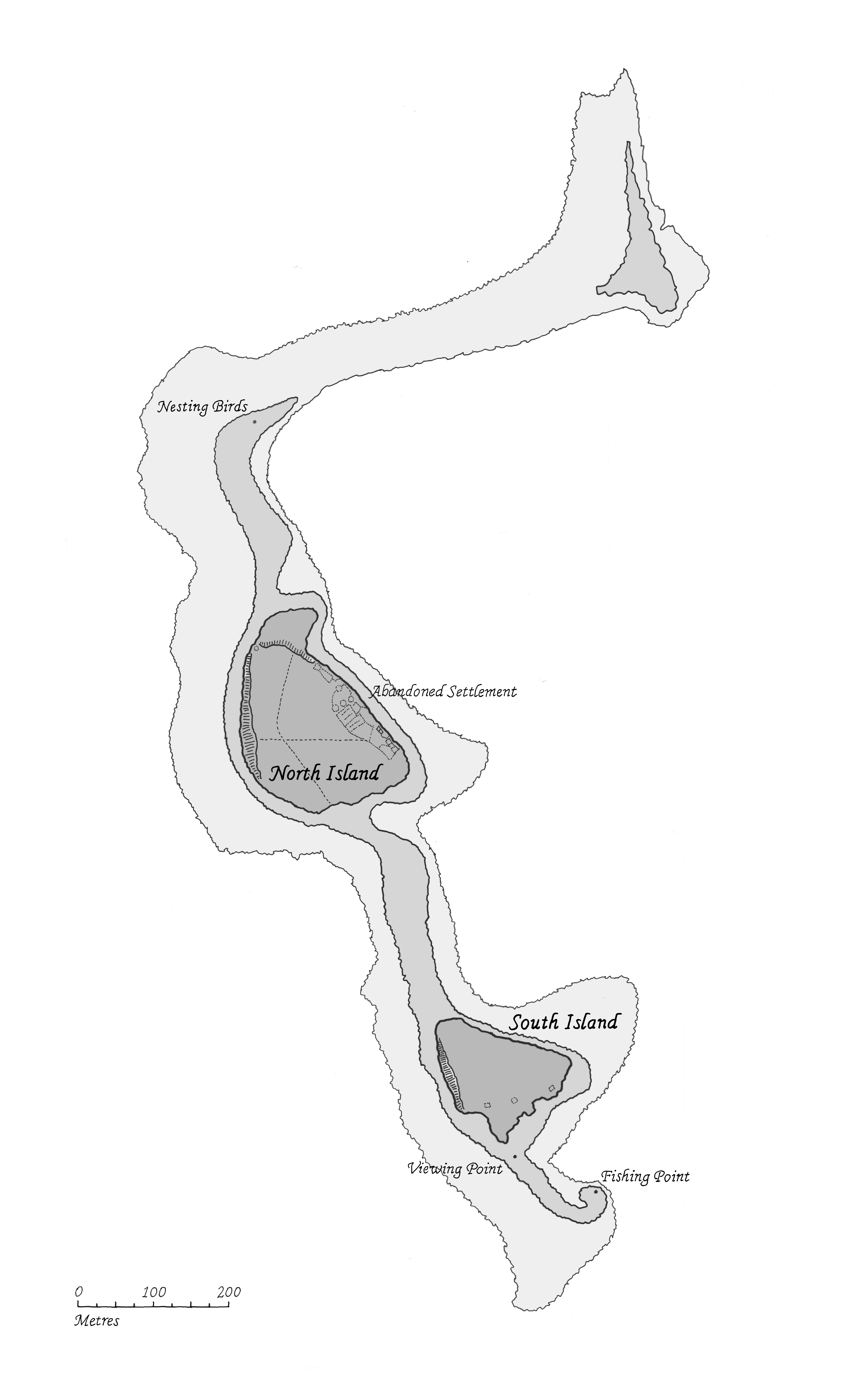
Map of Dorinish Island

=== John Lennon purchase and hippie commune ===
The island was previously owned by John Lennon, who purchased it in 1967 for £1,700. Previously used by sailing ships for its stones, the island became a place of peace for Lennon and his family. After his divorce from wife Cynthia, the island went unused until Lennon invited "King of the Hippies" Sid Rawle and Timi Walsh to establish a commune on the island in 1970. For the next two years, a group of roughly 25 hippies called Dorinish home, growing their own vegetables and raising children. They called themselves "the Diggers". Rawle would later say "Dorinish was heaven and it was hell".

In 1972 a fire burned down the island's supply tent and the commune disbanded. After Lennon's death, Yoko Ono sold the island for nearly £30,000 and donated the proceeds to an Irish orphanage. Dorinish is now used as a grazing site for livestock and is sometimes visited by enthusiastic Beatles fans. An artists' summer school "Aerial Blue" was held on the island in July 2011.

== Demographics ==
Historical population

Year	Pop.	±%
1841	13	—
1851	0	−100.0%
1861	0	0.00%
1871	15	—
1881	14	−6.7%
1891	6	−57.1%
1901	0	−100.0%
1911	0	0.00%
1926	0	0.00%

Year	Pop.	±%
1936	0	0.00%
1946	0	0.00%
1951	0	0.00%
1956	0	0.00%
1961	0	0.00%
1966	0	0.00%
1971	1	—
1979	5	+400.0%
1981	0	−100.0%

Year	Pop.	±%
1986	0	0.00%
1991	0	0.00%
1996	0	0.00%
2002	0	0.00%
2006	0	0.00%
2011	0	0.00%
2016	0	0.00%

Source: Central Statistics Office. "CNA17: Population by Off Shore Island, Sex and Year". CSO.ie.

== See also ==
- List of islands of County Mayo
